= List of Capital University people =

This is a list of notable individuals who currently have or previously had an association with Capital University, located in Bexley, Ohio. Capital University is a private liberal arts university of the Evangelical Lutheran Church in America, founded in 1830. In addition to its undergraduate programs, the university also has graduate programs, as well as a law school. Capital is the oldest university in Central Ohio, and one of the oldest and largest Lutheran-affiliated universities in North America.

== Notable alumni ==
- Hanif Abdurraqib, poet and music writer
- Ron Amstutz, Ohio state senator
- Tim Ayers, former mayor and city commissioner, Springfield, Ohio
- David F. Bowers, philosopher and Guggenheim Fellow
- C.C. Finlay, novelist (class of 1990)
- Robert S. Graetz, Lutheran pastor, openly supported Montgomery bus boycotts
- Jay Hottinger, Ohio state senator (R-31)
- Arnett Howard, jazz musician
- Chris Jamison, pop singer who appeared on Season 7 of The Voice
- Theodore E. Long, former president of Elizabethtown College
- Louis H. Mackey, philosopher
- Fernando Malvar-Ruiz, Litton-Lodal Music Director of The American Boychoir
- Eric Norelius, Lutheran minister, church leader and writer
- Abdul Samad Rabiu, Nigerian industrialist
- Harold L. Yochum, class of 1923, theologian, district president of the American Lutheran Church, 9th president of Capital University, delegate to the World Council of Churches

== Notable faculty ==
- Dorothy Gill Barnes, adjunct art instructor, 1966 to 1990
- Kevin R. Griffith, professor of English, poet
- Harold J. Grimm, professor of history and an expert on the Protestant Reformation
- Matthias Loy, elected president of Capital University in 1881
- William Morton Reynolds, president 1850 to 1853
- James Swearingen, music educator and composer
- Harvey Wasserman, liberal, anti-nuclear activist and adjunct professor in the History Department

== Law School ==
=== Notable faculty ===
A 2008 survey of faculty scholarship conducted by Roger Williams University School of Law found Capital's faculty to be one of the most productive scholarly faculties in the nation.

- Jack Guttenberg, legal writer; expert on professional responsibility; co-author of the authoritative source on the Ohio new law of professional conduct for attorneys, Ohio Law of Professional Conduct
- Bradley A. Smith, former commissioner and chairman of the Federal Election Commission 2000–2005

=== Notable alumni ===
- Jennifer Brunner, Ohio secretary of state (2007–2010)
- Bruce Edward Johnson, Ohio lt. governor (2004–2006)
- Jim Jordan, U.S. representative (R-OH, 2007–present)
- Greg Lashutka, mayor, Columbus, Ohio (1991–1999)
- Matthew W. McFarland, Ohio 4th District Court of Appeals judge
- Paul McNulty, United States deputy attorney general (2005–2007), United States attorney for the Eastern District of Virginia (2001–2005)
- Deborah Pryce, U.S. representative (R-OH, 1993–2008)
- Michael H. Watson, district judge for the United States District Court for the Southern District of Ohio
