= Columbus Theological Magazine =

Columbus Theological Magazine was a bi-monthly journal published from 1881 to 1910 by the Lutheran Book Concern of the Ohio Synod, based in Columbus, Ohio, US. Its 30 volumes served as a prominent theological periodical within the Evangelical Lutheran Church, particularly among English-speaking Lutherans in the Midwestern United States.

== History ==
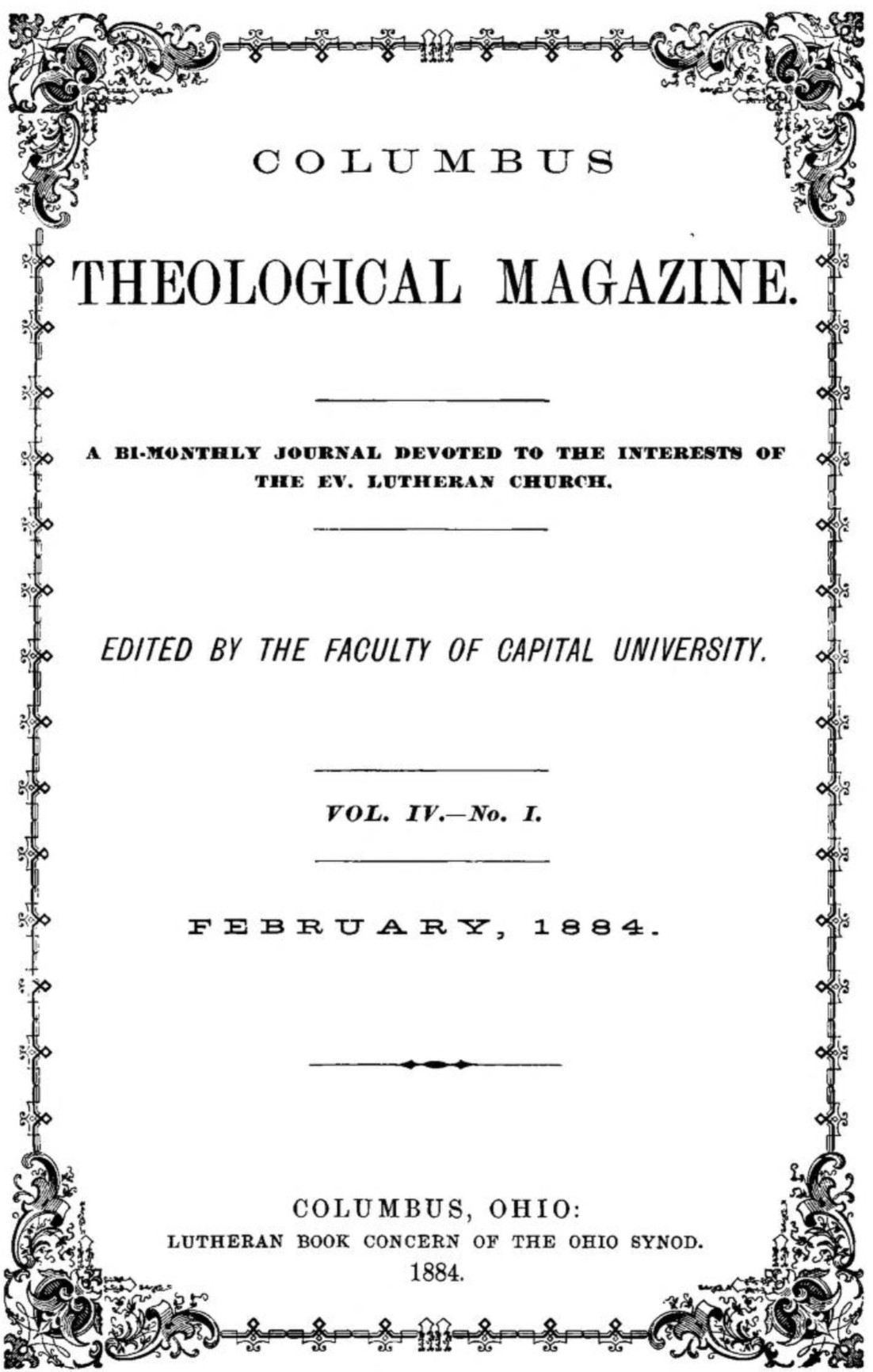
cover page of magazine

The magazine was founded in 1881 under the editorial leadership of Dr. Matthias Loy, a leading theologian and professor at Capital University. Loy was a defender of confessional Lutheranism and played a significant role in conducting theological discourse in the Ohio Synod. He also served as president of Capital University and the Evangelical Lutheran Joint Synod of Ohio. After its first publication, the Ohio Synod acquired Columbus Theological Magazine and placed it under synodical authority.

The publication started as a polemical journal focusing on the debate on the topic of predestination between the Ohio Synod and the Missouri Synod. In Vol. 1, "Loy ridiculed the Missouri attempt to reconcile its "new doctrine" with the explication of predestination in the Formula of Concord." As the first journal written entirely in the English language joining the debate, it quickly became the primary voice for the Ohio Synod's side in the Predestination Controversy. In response, the Missouri Synod began publishing the English periodicals "St. Louis Theological Monthly" (1881) and "Lutheran Witness" (1882). The first publication of Columbus Theological Magazine was a factor in leading the Missouri Synod to conclude that Loy had broken fellowship with them. In Vol. 2 the debate shifted to the topics of degrees of resistance to grace and conversion, which both sides admitted was at the heart of the controversy.

Over time the magazine evolved into a general theological magazine which addressed other issues relating to Scripture, theology, culture, higher education and history. Loy's "Introduction to Volume II" states,

We have the firm conviction that a periodical faithful in all respects to the symbolical books of the Ev. Lutheran Church, setting forth the old doctrines of the Reformation, endeavoring to make English readers acquainted with the treasures of learning and thought contained in old German and Latin folios, exhibiting the solidity and symmetry of the theological edifice erected by our fathers in an age less hurried and more thorough than the present, is what the Church has long since needed and now needs in the English language. This our periodical was meant in some measure to supply. Theology in all its departments— exegetical, historical, systematic, and practical—comes within its scope. Believing that such a journal can render an important service to the great Church of the Augsburg Confession, whose history and doctrines and claims are comparatively but little known to English readers, we regard it as worthy of some sacrifices to sustain it and secure for it a proper constituency.

== Editorial leadership ==
- Matthias Loy, Ph.D. (volumes 1–15, 1881–1895)
- George H. Schodde, Ph.D. (volumes 16–30, 1896–1910)

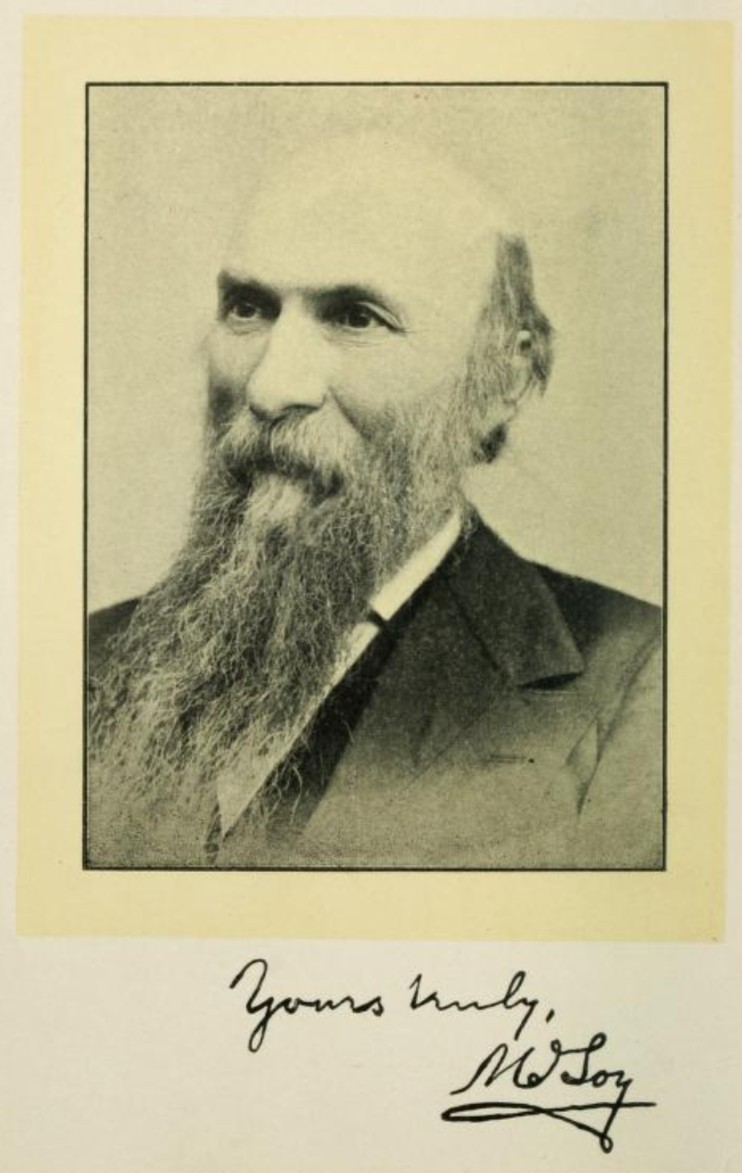
Portrait of Matthias Loy

== Frequent contributors ==
- George H. Schodde (191+ articles)
- Matthias Loy (114+ articles)
- Conrad H. L. Schuette (55 articles)
- Frederick W. Stellhorn (47 articles)
- Lewis Herman Schuh (22 articles)
- A. Pflueger (21 articles)

== Contents and themes ==
See also: List of Columbus Theological Magazine articles

The magazine featured a wide range of theological, homiletical, cultural and ecclesiastical topics, including:

- Predestination and Free Will
- Traditional Lutheran Doctrines such as Justification, Faith, Sacraments and Christology
- Biblical exegesis
- Lutheran confessions
- Sermons, homiletical guides and funeral addresses
- Missionary reports
- Church history, especially Reformation and American Lutheran developments
- Education, including critiques of modern pedagogy
- Ethics and culture
- Responses to rationalism, criticism and evolution

== Recurring features ==
- Research Notes
- News from the Ohio Synod
- Translations from works of the Lutheran fathers
- Indexes to synodical minutes and publications
- Studies in Gospel Harmony
- Homiletical Department
- Editorials
- Serialized articles

== Influence and legacy ==
The Columbus Theological Magazine shaped the theological identity of the Ohio Synod and its affiliated institutions. As the first fully English publication coming out of the Synodical Conference tradition, it influenced both clergy and laymen for decades. It provided a platform for conservative Lutheran voices during a period of doctrinal controversy and shifting ecclesiastical associations. The magazine ceased publication in 1910, having produced 30 volumes over its lifespan. Thereafter the contributions were combined with Theologische Zeitblätter to form the bilingual Theologische Zeitblätter - Theological Magazine (1911–1919). Later journals such as "The Pastor's Monthly" (1923–1935) met similar needs after the Ohio Synod began affiliating with other Lutheran synods.

== See also ==
- Ohio Synod
- Capital University (Ohio)
- Matthias Loy
- George Schodde
- Frederick William Stellhorn
- Anti-Missourian Brotherhood
