= Backwaters Press =

American book publishing company

The Backwaters Press was a small press based in Omaha, Nebraska. It was a 501(c)(3) non-profit devoted to publishing poetry and literary fiction, with a special emphasis on the literature of Nebraska.

The press was acquired in 2018 by The University of Nebraska Press and continues as a general interest imprint of UNP. The Backwaters Prize continues under UNP's auspices.

== History ==
The press published numerous award-winning titles, including the anthologies Times of Sorrow, Times of Grace (2003) and Nebraska Presence: An Anthology of Poetry (2007), which won Nebraska Book Awards. In all, the press has been awarded seventeen Nebraska Book Awards since 2000 for anthologies, design and individual author's collections of poetry. According to Project MUSE, "Each year, the small Omaha press publishes two or three titles by Heartland writers, bringing the often stunning but sometimes forgotten voices of the Midwest to the literary world."

In 2011, Greg Kosmicki, the editor, and the press were awarded the Jane Geske Award for "exceptional, long-term contribution" to books in Nebraska. Backwaters Press has published approximately 90 authors in independent volumes of poetry. Authors published by Backwaters Press include: long-time Nebraska State Poet William Kloefkorn (1982-2011), current Nebraska State Poet Twyla Hansen (2013-), Kansas State Poet Denise Low (2007-2009), and the multiple award-winning authors: Charles Fort, Marge Saiser, Lola Haskins, Greg Kuzma, David Ray, and Brent Spencer.

The editor of the Backwaters Press in 2015 was James Cihlar, the managing editor was Cat Dixon and the Associate Editor was Rich Wyatt. In past years, Backwaters offered the Backwaters Prize, the Weldon Kees Award, and the Omaha Prize, but discontinued the prizes in 2005. In 2012, The Backwaters Press awards the Backwaters Prize for an original book length manuscript.

== The Backwaters Prize winners ==
The Press awards an annual prize to a book of poetry.

- – John Sibley Williams for Skin Memory (University of Nebraska Press, 2019)
- 2015 – Kim Garcia for DRONE
- 2014 – Katharine Whitcomb for The Daughter’s Almanac
- 2013 – Zeina Hashem Beck for To Live in Autumn
- 2012 – Susan Elbe for The Map of What Happened
- 2005-2011 Prize Suspended
- 2004 - Aaron Anstett for No Accident
- 2003 - Michelle Gillett for Blinding the Goldfinches
- 2002 - Ginny MacKenzie for Skipstone
- 2001 - Susan Firer for The Laugh We Make When We Fall
- 2000 - David Staudt for The Gifts and the Thefts
- 1999 - Sally Allen McNall for Rescue
- 1998 - Kevin R. Griffith for Paradise Refunded

The winner receives a cash prize of $1,000 and publication of the winning manuscript. Susan Firer has been awarded a 2015 NEA Creative Writing Fellowship in Poetry.

== See also ==
List of small presses
