= Freedom of religion in Germany =

Freedom of religion in Germany is guaranteed by article 4 of the German constitution. This states that "the freedom of religion, conscience and the freedom of confessing one's religious or philosophical beliefs are inviolable. Uninfringed religious practice is guaranteed." In addition, article 3 states that "No one may be prejudiced or favored because of his gender, his descent, his race, his language, his homeland and place of origin, his faith or his religious or political views." Any person or organization can call the Federal Constitutional Court of Germany for free help.

The German system of state support for otherwise independent religious institutions assists all religions equally in principle, though in practice it has been unable to fully encompass some minority faiths. The government has granted most of the country's major religious communities "public law corporation" (PLC) status – Körperschaft des öffentlichen Rechts in German – which allows for numerous benefits. Traditions that lack a centrally organized national structure – most notably Islam – have had difficulty attaining PLC status and the benefits that come with it.

In 2023, the country was scored 3 out of 4 for religious freedom.

== Legal situation ==
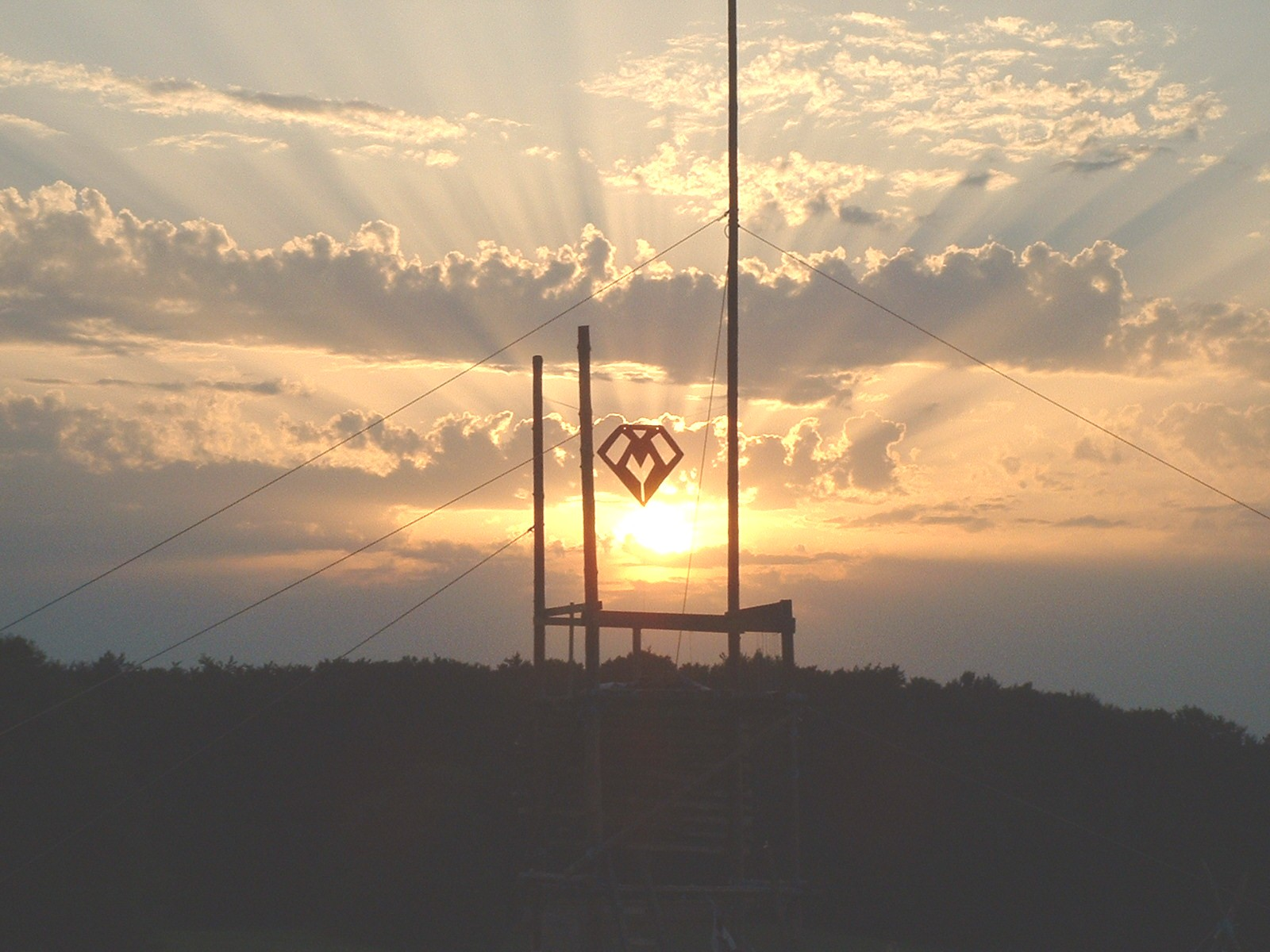
A Mennonite Brethren church camp in North Rhine-Westphalia. Mennonites refrain from participation in military service.

The freedom of religion in the Grundgesetz (Basic Law) means one may adopt any kind of religious or non-religious belief, practice it in private or in public, confess it, or keep it for oneself. The state does not identify with any religious organization. This distinction of church and state originated in what is now called the two kingdoms doctrine.

Religious freedom, like the other basic rights of the Grundgesetz, is limited where it collides with the core value of human dignity or with the basic rights of others, or if it is misused to fight against the basic constituency of free democracy.

Art. 4 sec. III provides for the right to refrain from military service in the name of religion (lit. "conscience").

=== Individual freedom of religion ===
Besides collective, German law protects individual freedom of religion, which is to be distinguished into positive and negative freedom of religion. Negative freedom of religion covers the right not to confess your faith unless legally required (i. e. registration for church tax) and the right not to be exposed to religion while in a position of "subordination" where one is legally required to attend. Landmark decisions are the Crucifix Decision and the Headscarf Decision.

==== Crucifix Decision ====
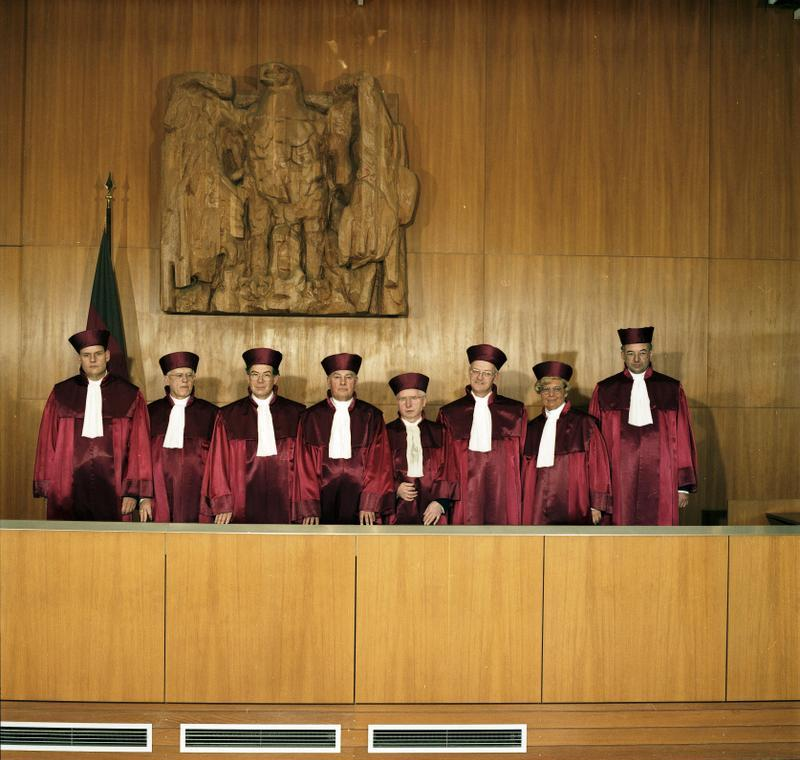
Federal Constitutional Court judges, 1989

In the Crucifix Decision the German Federal Constitution Court in 1995 decreed a law that insisted on the presence of religious symbols (crucifixes) in public institutions to be illegal, excluding in some Roman Catholic elementary schools. The court further demanded that the symbols must be removed if a parent does not agree with them. In 1973, a Jew complained successfully that his freedom of religion was violated by the obligation to speak in a German courtroom decorated by a cross.

==== Headscarf Decision ====
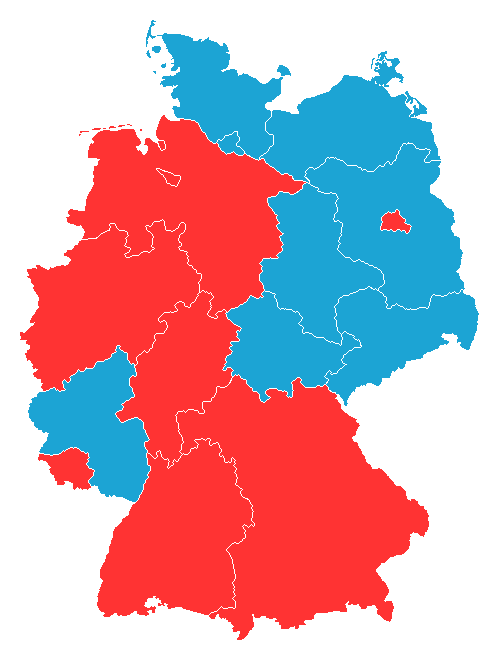
The blue states permit teacher headscarves, but the red states have teacher headscarf bans (map as of 2007).

In 2004, the German Supreme court denied a Muslim teacher the right to wear a headscarf in class, on the basis that she had to represent neutrality. In this case, freedom of religion (of teachers) had to be brought into "balance" with the state's authority over schools (art. 7), the freedom not to be exposed to religion while in a state of subordination (art. 4), resp. the parents' rights to raise their children (art. 6), and the specific duties of teachers as state servants (art. 33). German courts rarely hold the freedom of religious and non-religious belief to be infringed, as freedom of religion is limited by the exertion of other basic rights (and duties) guaranteed by the Grundgesetz. Already in the late 1970s, a teacher had also been denied the right to wear the distinct clothing of his religion at the workplace. In 2007 the Bavarian Constitutional Court upheld the ban on teachers with headscarves but affirmed that nuns could continue to wear habits while teaching.

==== School exemptions ====
In Germany, high school students are not excused from classes on sexual education and evolution theory on the basis of religion, as it collides with the state's authority over schools (art. 7) and the legal duty to attend schools. However, according to the case law of the Federal Administrative Court, a claim for exemption from sports or swimming lessons on religious grounds may be made for Islamic schoolgirls if they can concretely demonstrate credible convictions or bans in religious conflicts and there is no reasonable and non-discriminatory alternative for them. As a result, girls may be exempt from swimming due to modesty concerns.

Homeschooling for religious reasons is illegal. German laws against homeschooling are the strictest among all developed countries. The Romeike family sought asylum in the United States in order to homeschool, but their case is currently subject to pending legislation.

==== Apostasy ====
To leave a church or an officially registered religious group, authorities in almost all states demand citizens to pay an administrative fee between €30 and €60. It is not possible to leave an officially registered religion (and to end the tax duty on the income) by just declaring the rejection of the belief to this religious group.

==== Censorship ====
Logo from the defunct kreuz.net website, which was shut down when the supporting hardware was confiscated in Austria. The subtitle translates as "catholic news."

Some religious writings are cataloged in the Index of Harmful Materials, which outlaws all sales except those made under-the-counter. Organized religious bodies are given representation on the 12 person panel which votes on censorship. Although the list of censored websites is kept secret from the public, one of the more prominent cases involved the traditionalist Catholic blog kreuz.net, which has since been shut down. It has since been replaced with kreuz-net.at which is run by another individual.

==== Circumcision ====
In 2012, a Cologne regional court ruled child circumcision to be illegal when not medically necessary. This ruling proved to be controversial; on the one hand, surveys found most Germans to be in favor of the decision, while on the other hand, the ruling sparked debate over religious freedom due to circumcision's importance in Judaism and Islam. Critics of the ruling, such as Germany's Central Council of Jews and Religious Community of Islam, argued that the ruling was insensitive and counterproductive to religious freedom and integration, while supporters of the decision, such as criminal law professor Holm Putzke of the University of Passau, argued that circumcision was physically harmful and that parents did not have the legal authority to consent to such a procedure when not medically necessary. Chancellor Angela Merkel opposed the ruling, saying “I do not want Germany to be the only country in the world where Jews cannot practice their rituals. Otherwise we will become a laughing stock.” The German Parliament ultimately reversed the court's decision, passing legislation that legalized non-therapeutic circumcision of underage boys even though it is medically harmful.

==== Contraception ====
Some persons in Germany do not practice contraception for religious reasons.

==== Meat ====
In 2002 the Federal Constitutional Court struck down a ban on ritual slaughter.

=== Collective freedom of religion ===
German law on freedom of religion distinguishes between individual and collective freedom of religion. Collective freedom of religion additionally covers the legal statutes of religious organizations, but this freedom only applies to religious communities "whose constitution and number of members ensure the guarantee of continuity." Of special interest is the statute of corporate body under public law, which allows the organization to collect the four percent church tax and hold religious education in state schools.

==== Types of legal statutes ====
A religious group in Germany can be formed under all legal statutes. It can be organised as a company under Corporate law, but tax regulations, company duties, and responsibilities are often seen as disadvantages. A voluntary association can be formed by anybody. Registration as an "eingetragener Verein" (abbreviated e.V.) gives the advantage of legally functioning as a corporate body (juristic person), rather than a simple group of individuals. It can by used by any secular or religious group.

==== Nonprofits ====
Two other types of organizations are often employed: the most frequent are gemeinnützige not-for-profit corporations, which can be companies or registered associations. This status requires not only limitation to noncommercial activities, but similar to American nonprofits, it is limited to those whose primary objective is to support an issue or matter of private interest or public concern for noncommercial purposes. Like many other countries, nonprofits may apply for tax exemption status, so that the organization itself may be exempt from taxes. In some cases, financial donors may claim back any income tax paid on their donations, or deduct from their own tax liability the amount of the donation.

==== Corporate body under public law ====
The second is a Körperschaft des öffentlichen Rechts (corporate body under public law), a status which is specifically granted to religious groups. Some smaller communities may have this status in one state, while they maintain a different status in another. The status has a string of benefits attached. Religious communities which are organized under public law have the right to collect contributions (church tax) according to laws which are similar to general tax laws. Religious communities enjoy further privileges regarding building and tax regulations, the ability to teach religion as a regular course in state schools, and the ability to be represented in media consulting committees.

==== The right to collect church tax ====
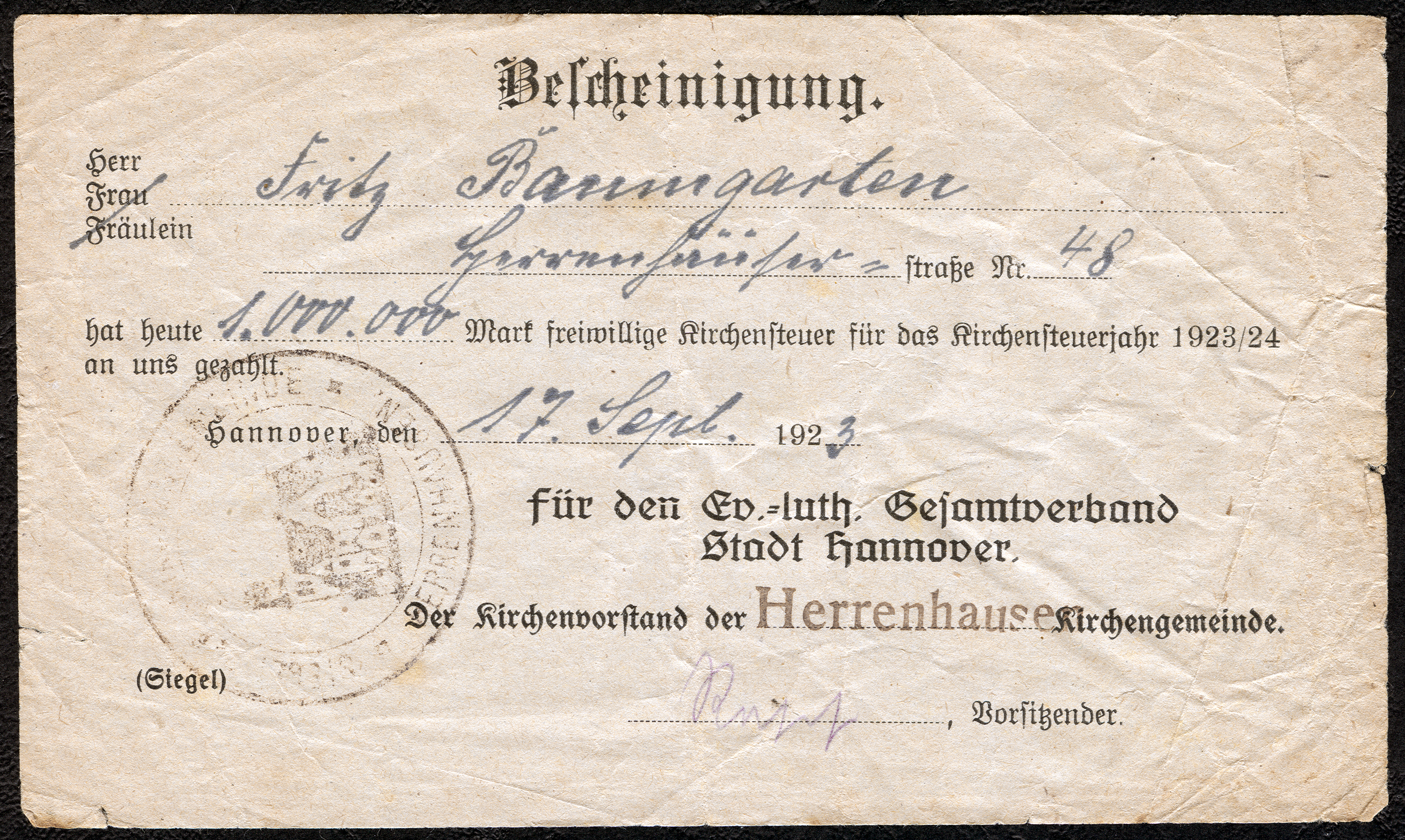
Kirchensteuer receipt dated September 17, 1923

The so-called "church tax" (German: Kirchensteuer) for corporate bodies under public law is collected with the regular state tax by the state from all registered members of these denominations. On the basis of tax regulations within the limits set by state laws, communities may either request the state to collect fees from members in the form of a surcharge of the income tax assessment (the authorities would then withhold a collection fee), or they may choose to collect the tax themselves. Not all bodies entitled to collect church tax actually collect it, as some Old Confession Churches believe it to be contrary to the separation of church and state. Also, organizations belonging to the Confederation of Free-thinking Communities of Germany are also entitled to collect the four percent "church" tax, although not all of them do.

In the first case, membership to the community is registered onto a taxation document (Lohnsteuerkarte). The member's employer must then withhold church tax prepayments from the income of the employee in addition to the prepayments on the annual income tax. In connection with the final annual income tax assessment, the state revenue authorities also finally assess the church tax owed. In case of self-employed persons or other tax payers not employed, state revenue authorities collect prepayments on the church tax together with prepayments on the income tax.

In case of own collection, collecting communities may demand the tax authorities to reveal taxation data of their members, in order to be able to calculate the contributions and prepayments owed. In particular, smaller communities (e.g. the Jewish Community of Berlin) chose to collect taxes by themselves in order to save the collection fee. Collection of church tax may be used to found institutions and foundations or to pay ministers. Seminary training at state universities is funded by the government instead of through church tax.

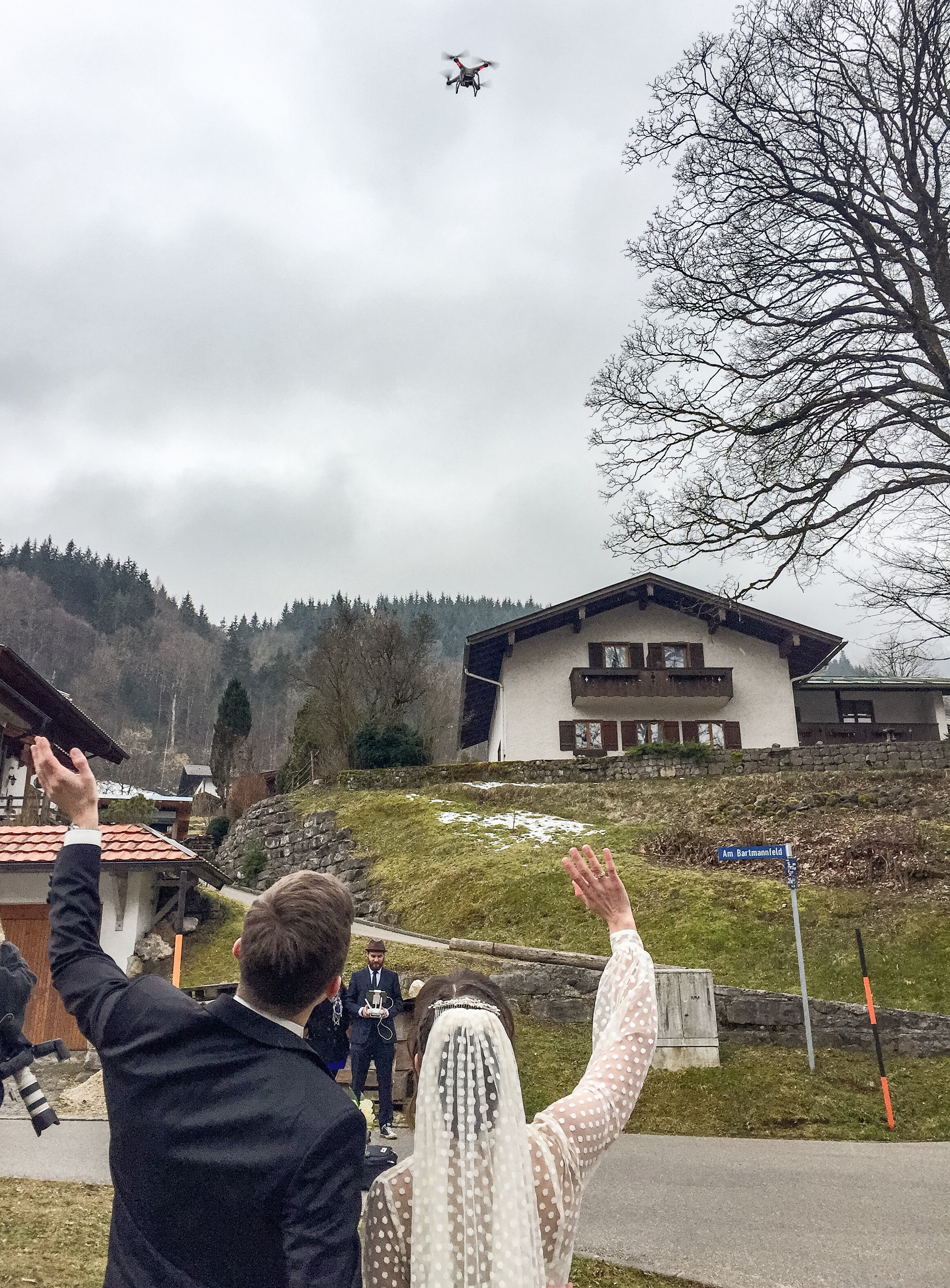
Wedding in Germany, March 2016

The church tax is only paid by members of the respective religious corporate body under public law . Those who are not members of a tax collecting denomination are not required to pay it. Members of a religious community which is a corporate body under public law may formally declare to state authorities that they wish to leave the community (this is commonly referred to as "leaving the church"). With such declaration, the obligation to pay church taxes ends. The concerned religious organisations usually refuse to administer rites of passage, such as marriages and burials of (former) members who had seceded. To rejoin a religious corporate body under public law one would get one's declaration of re-entry officially recorded. The Conference of the German Bishops, however, considers the declaration to "leave the church" to be a schismatic act to be punished automatically by excommunication.

The church tax is historically rooted in the pre-Christian Germanic custom where the chief of the tribe was directly responsible for the maintenance of priests and religious cults. During the Christianization of Western Europe, this custom was adopted by the churches into the concept of Eigenkirchen (churches owned by the landlord), which stood in strong contrast to the central church organization of the Roman Catholics. Despite the resulting medieval conflict between the emperor and pope, the concept of church maintenance by the ruler remained the accepted custom in most Western European countries. In Reformation times, the local princes in Germany officially became heads of the church in Protestant areas, and were legally responsible for the maintenance of churches; the aforementioned practice is legally referred to as Summepiscopat. Only in the 19th century did the financial flows of churches and state get regulated to a point where the churches became financially independent – the church tax was introduced to replace the state benefits the churches had obtained before.

===== Fee for leaving a religious corporate body under public law =====
In July 2008, the Federal Constitutional Court of Germany had to decide whether a fee for leaving a religious corporate body under public law ("leaving the church") was in accordance with the constitution. Ultimately, the court decided it was an unconstitutional infringement of religious liberty. As the state of affairs in August 2008 noted, declaring that one is no longer a member of a church costs between 10 and 30 € in most federal states. It is free in Berlin, Brandenburg, Bremen, and Thuringia; in some communities in Baden-Württemberg, in contrast, it may cost up to 60 €. In its decision, the Federal Constitutional Court also clarified that the legislator is required by the constitution to reduce the fee, in cases where the person who wants to "leave the church" does not have any personal income. The German atheist group IBKA disagreed with the decision and took the issue to the European Court of Human Rights.

===== The right to provide religious education at state schools =====
Education is the responsibility of the 16 federal states (Bundesländer), and each state can decide how to organise religious education. In most states, religious education is obligatory. The curriculum is provided by the churches and approved by the state. Usually the Roman Catholic Church and one Protestant Church each provide school lessons for members of their own denominations, and for members of other denominations that wish to participate. Smaller denominations and some other religious minorities either co-operate with one of the big ones or may decide to conduct classes outside school. In the latter case they can provide the school with details of pupils' performance, so that this information can be included in school reports.

Children who do not want to participate in religious education are obliged to attend an alternative class called "ethics", in which various issues of philosophy, society, and morals are discussed.

In most cases, even if pupils that stay in one class for almost all their lessons, they are divided into groups (Roman Catholic, Protestant, Jewish, Islamic, Ethics) for their religious education, joining other pupils they might not know very well, but who belong to the same denomination.

The position is reversed in some states (Berlin, Brandenburg): the default option, similar to "ethics", is called "knowledge of life". Pupils may choose instead to attend a denominational course, although in Berlin ethics is mandatory for all students starting in middle school in addition to an optional denominational course. Islamic classes are developed by the government because with the exception of the Ahmadiyya, Muslim associations are not corporate bodies under public law.

Other states (Bremen, Hamburg) have different systems, which is permitted by the Bremen clause.

==== Blasphemy law ====
In Germany, religious defamation is covered by Article 166 of the Strafgesetzbuch, the German criminal law. If a deed is capable of disturbing the public peace, defamation is actionable. The article reads as follows:

§ 166 Defamation of religious denominations, religious societies and World view associations
(1) Whoever publicly or by dissemination of writings (§ 11 par. 3) defames, in a manner suitable to disturb the public peace, the substance of the religious or world view conviction of others, shall be fined or imprisoned for up to three years.
(2) Whoever publicly or by dissemination of writings (§ 11 par. 3) defames, in a manner suitable to disturb the public peace, a church existing in Germany or other religious society or world view association, or their institutions or customs, shall be punished likewise.

In 2006, the application of this article received much media attention when a Manfred van H. (also known as "Mahavo") was prosecuted for defamation for distributing rolls of toilet paper with the words "Koran, the Holy Koran" stamped on them. The defendant claimed he wanted to protest the murder of Dutch filmmaker Theo van Gogh in 2004 and the London bombings of 2005. Beyond the sentence he also received death threats from Islamists and needed a police bodyguard.

==== Illegality of religious TV advertisements ====
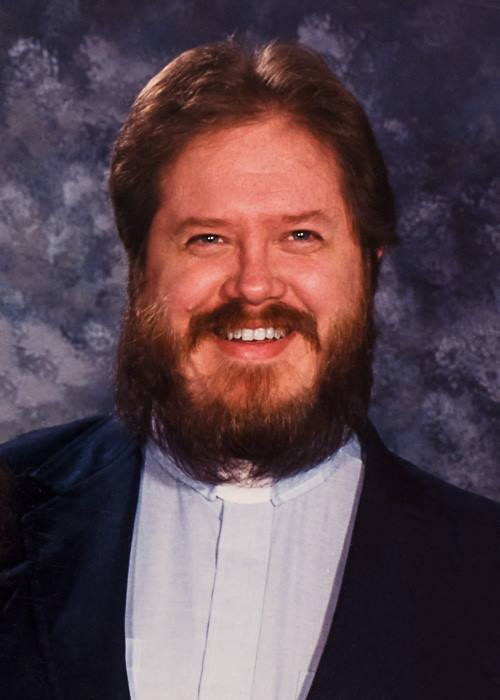
David Chilton (1951–1997), one of the authors of Power for Living

In 2002, there was a legal controversy regarding the "Power for Living" campaign by the Christian Arthur S. DeMoss Foundation featuring celebrities Cliff Richard and Bernhard Langer. The TV advertisings for their book were banned because they were considered as "advertising a worldview or religion", which is forbidden by § 7 section 8 of the state treaty on broadcasting (Rundfunkstaatsvertrag) and European laws on media. For its posters, newspaper adverts and leaflets, however, there was no such problem.

==== Cults, sects, and new religious movements ====
The right of self-determination in Germany only applies to religious communities "whose constitution and number of members ensure the guarantee of continuity."

===== State-issued information on NRM =====
The German government provides information about cults, sects, and new religious movements. In 1997, the parliament set up a commission for Sogenannte Sekten und Psychogruppen (literally "so-called sects and psychic groups") which delivered an extensive report on the situation in Germany regarding NRMs in 1998.

The main point of critics against Sekten from the governmental side is that they propagate a concept of the ideal human (Menschenbild de:Menschenbild) which is very different of the concept underlying the Grundgesetz (Basic Law). For example, some cults may stress the inequality of social groups, races or sexes, and foster a culture where blind obedience and fundamentalism are welcomed. The Grundgesetz, however, says that all people are equal and envisages people who are open-minded, discerning and tolerant.

In 2002, Germany's Federal Constitutional Court ruled that the German government had violated its constitution in its treatment of the Rajneesh movement, using deprecating expressions about it that were not based on fact. The Federal Constitutional Court took eleven years to come to its decision, and the overall duration of proceedings from the original complaint lasted over 18 years; Germany was subsequently fined by the European Court of Human Rights for the excessive duration of the case. Given the limits set by the Federal Constitutional Court on the permitted scope of government actions in 2002, the European Court of Human Rights found that Germany was not in violation of Article 9 (freedom of thought, conscience and religion), Article 10 (freedom of expression) and Article 14 (prohibition of discrimination) of the European Convention on Human Rights, but found that it had violated Article 6 § 1 (right to a fair hearing within a reasonable time).

===== Jehovah's Witnesses =====
Since the 1990s, German courts have repeatedly denied the request of the Jehovah's Witnesses to become a corporate body under public law for various reasons, one of them being that the Jehovah's Witnesses would discourage their members from taking part in state elections, and would not respect the Grundgesetz.

In March 2005, Jehovah's Witnesses were granted the status of a body of public law for the state of Berlin, on the grounds that the alleged lack of fidelity towards the state had not been convincingly proven. The decision on the group's status in Berlin was upheld by the Federal Administrative Court in 2006. In subsequent years, corresponding decisions were made in 12 other states. In the states of Baden-Württemberg, and Bremen, the group was denied the status in 2011.

Due to their status of corporate body under public law (in some states), Jehovah's Witnesses in 2010 filed a complaint for broadcasting time at Germany's international broadcaster, Deutsche Welle.

Concerning the issue of blood transfusions, the Federal Constitutional Court has held that transfusing blood to an unconscious Jehovah's Witness violated the person's will, but did not constitute a battery.

===== Scientology =====
German courts have come to different decisions on employees and members of Scientology regarding their religious status. The German government considers Scientology "an organization pursuing commercial interests". Scientology is not classified as a non-profit organization in Germany, and the current organizational form of Scientology is "Scientology Kirche e.V." (eingetragener Verein, or registered association). Germany has been criticized over its treatment of Scientologists in United States human rights and religious freedom reports, and the U.S. government has repeatedly expressed its concern over the matter. Rebutting such accusations, and justifying its stance on Scientology, the German embassy in Washington has said that the German government believed Scientology's "pseudo-scientific courses can seriously jeopardise individuals' mental and physical health, and that it exploits its members."

==== Display of neo-pagan symbols ====
There have been cases of groups in Germany which practice Germanic neopaganism facing legal sanctions because of their display of symbols, such as runes or the Celtic cross, which prosecutors have deemed illegal under laws against neo-Nazi propaganda. Using "unconstitutional symbols", namely the swastika, is an offense punishable by up to three years in jail or a fine according to § 86a of the German Criminal Code.

== Historical development ==
The 1550 Magdeburg Confession developed the doctrine of lesser magistrates, which allowed for a limited right of resistance to unjust rule, including with respect to faith. The Peace of Augsburg in 1555 changed the legal situation from a uniform Roman Catholic area to the Cuius regio, eius religio principle, which defined freedom of religion for territorial princes, while their subjects had to follow them. Individuals had at best the possibility to move into an area where their confession was practiced. Others feigned belief in the dominant church (see Nicodemite and Crypto-protestantism). Depending on the reigning prince, there could exist a certain tolerance towards other denominations, but not as a common law.

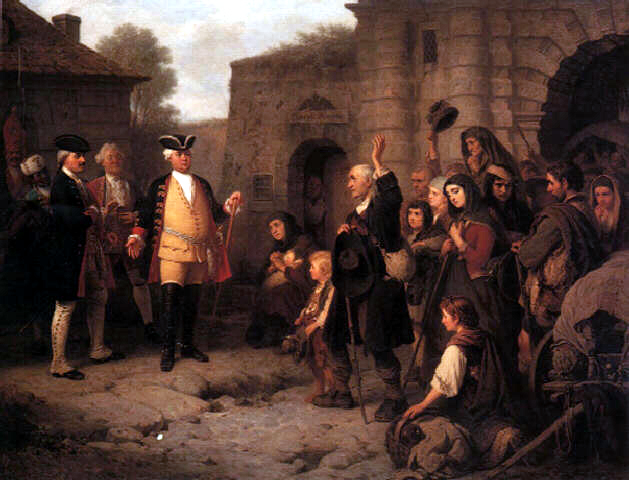
King Frederick William I of Prussia welcomes the Salzburg Protestants who settled in Prussian lands after being expelled from their homeland.

In the first half of the 17th century, Germany was laid to waste by the Thirty Years' War, where the lines between enemies within Germany followed mainly denominational borders between the areas of the Catholic League (German) and those of the Protestant Union. The following Syncretistic controversy improved Protestant understanding of Catholicism, but risked schism between competing Lutheran factions. Pastor and hymn writer Paul Gerhardt was forced out of office in 1755 due to his staunch Lutheran convictions in a Berlin ruled by a Reformed prince.

In the 18th century, the idea of freedom of religion was promoted by cultural leaders like philosopher Immanuel Kant and dramatist Gotthold Ephraim Lessing, but their stress was on the freedom of the individual to believe or to not adhere to the beliefs of a dominant state church. King Frederick William III of Prussia granted Jews in some areas citizenship in 1812 with his Judenedikt. The 1817 Prussian Union of Churches resulted in the persecution of Old Lutherans. For example, Johannes Andreas August Grabau was stripped of his clerical office and imprisoned for one year. Old Lutherans emigrated en masse from affected areas such as Prussia, Silesia, and Pomerania to North America and South Australia. This also spurred the emigration of sympathizers in nearby Saxony to Missouri. This conflict resulted in the eventual government recognition of free churches following the death of Frederick William III of Prussia. His successor, Frederick William IV, issued the General Concession of July 23, 1845, granting toleration to Lutheran free churches. In 1847 he replaced the 1812 Judenedikt with a broader Judengesetz which gave citizenship and free rights of movement to Jews in all but one location. In 1852, he issued a Duldungsbillet granting toleration to Baptists and other Protestant dissidents to organize their own free churches. It was, however, only for those communities that have "formed since the Reformation" within the Protestant confession, and have proven to be safe and believing rather than radical. Toleration was limited in the event that "the decency" and "feeling and the security of the state mandate it."

The German Empire of 1871 recognized a basic religious freedom for individuals. During World War I, Jewish field chaplains were used by the Army for the first time. The 1919 Weimar constitution recognized the freedom of religion in a manner similar to how it is today under the Basic Law. Individual freedom of religion was described in Article 136: the civil and civic rights and duties are neither qualified nor restricted by exercise of freedom of religion. No one can be forced to attend an ecclesiastical act or ceremony or be forced to take part in religious exercises or use a religious formula of oath.

Article 137 of the Weimar constitution was about religious associations. Main points include the omission of recognition of a state church. Religious associations manage their own affairs within the limits of general law. Religious offices are given without the influence of the state. Religious associations are legal entities. Religious associations which are "bodies of public law" keep this status. Other religious associations can request the same rights, if they can show by their constituency and number of members that they are permanently established. Associations with the purpose of cultivating a world view have the same status as religious associations.

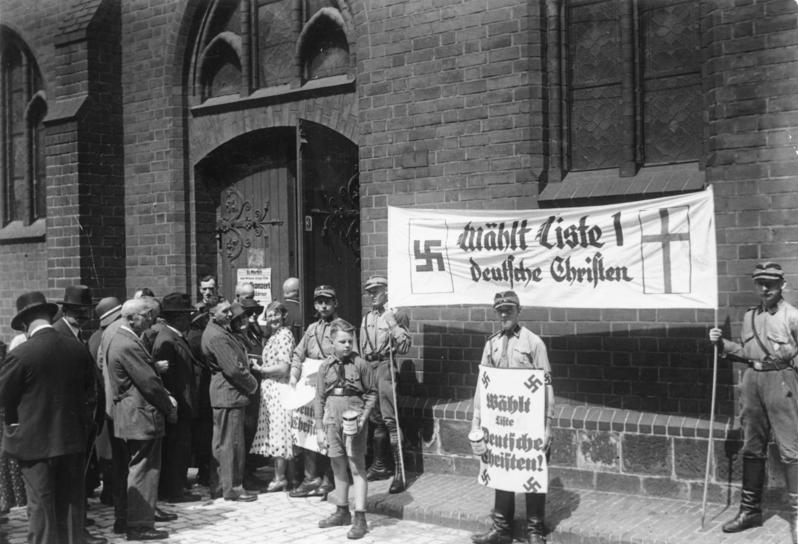
Stormtroopers holding German Christians propaganda during the Church Council elections on 23 July 1933 at St. Mary's Church, Berlin. These elections resulted in the merger of the German state churches.

During the time of the Third Reich, there was a very real danger of religious persecution for adherents of any religious association beside the Protestant Reich Church, such as members of the Confessing Church. For example, there were priest barracks at Dachau Concentration Camp and the Bruderhof colony was dissolved. During denazification following the war, theologians and clergy who were accused of having supported the Nazis were removed from their positions.

In 1949, West Germany formulated religious freedom in the Grundgesetz. Although communist East Germany officially claimed religious freedom, the actual practice was to allow a low-key private exercise of religion that did not interfere with any duties towards the state. Outspoken pastors had to face prison in extreme cases, but the more frequent way of dealing with openly confessing Christians and clerics was subtle repression, like strict observance by the state security, or forbidding admission to college for their children. Only following the collapse of communism was the Evangelical Lutheran Free Church able to re-establish church-fellowship with the Wisconsin Evangelical Lutheran Synod.

In the late 20th and early 21st century, free churcher and doctor of theology Johannes Lerle was fined four times and twice sentenced (by the German government) to prison for making statements against abortion on the internet and distributing anti-abortion leaflets. Prior to this he had also served prison time in East Germany (where he had lived prior to 1988) for distributing Christian literature. Again in 2012 he also served one year for incitement for allegedly denying the Holocaust, which he contested in unsuccessfully in court. Although Lerle had claimed that Mein Kampf was "Satanic," he was targeted by the court for comparing abortion to the holocaust on his website. Because the law against Holocaust denial in Germany includes a prohibition on not just denying, but even downplaying "an act committed under the rule of National Socialism," Lerle's rhetoric comparing death tolls of the Holocaust and abortion was considered illegal.

Jews in Germany face acts of antisemitic violence, but it is condemned by authorities. Muslims have encountered resistance to minaret and mosque construction, such as during the Cologne Central Mosque controversy.

=== Consequences ===
Although the church and state in Germany have been legally separated since the Weimar Republic, there remains the fact that each area of Germany has been under the dominating social and cultural influence of one single landeskirche, be it Reformed, United, Lutheran, or Roman Catholic. Concentrating this influence, periods of religious cleansing during the Counter-Reformation saw populations of Protestants emptied out of some areas settled into others. This influence determined education, arts, music, customs, festivals, lifestyle, and even, to some degree, architecture. In eastern Germany and in urban areas, this cultural influence of religion has been substantially reduced; but, in rural areas, it still can be felt in Bavaria, and in some areas of Baden-Württemberg and the Siegerland.

== See also ==
- Religion in Germany
