= Frederick William Stellhorn =

American theologian

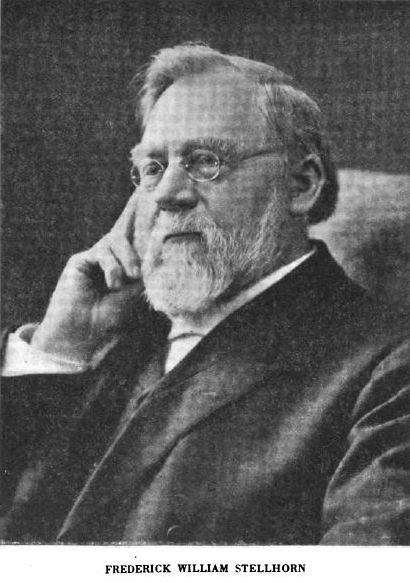
- Born: October 2, 1841; Brüninghorstedt, Hanover, Lower Saxony
- Died: March 17, 1919 (aged 77); Columbus, Ohio, US
- Education: Concordia Seminary and Northwestern College
- Spouse(s): Christiane Maria Buenger, Louise Darst
- Church: Lutheran Church–Missouri Synod and Ohio Synod
- Ordained: 1865
- Congregations served: German Evangelical Lutheran Immanuel, St. Louis, MO
- Offices held: Professor, Northwestern College, Watertown, Wisconsin (WELS),(1869–74).; Professor, Concordia College, Fort Wayne, Indiana, (LCMS), (1874–81); President, Capital University, Columbus, Ohio (1894–1900), Professor (1881–1919), (Ohio Synod).

Frederick William Stellhorn (2 October 1841 – 17 March 1919), an American Lutheran theologian, was born in Brüninghorstedt, a community in Warmsen the Landkreis of Hannover, in Lower Saxony (Niedersachsen), Germany.

== Early years ==
Stellhorn was born at Brüninghorstedt in the Kingdom of Hanover, Germany, son of Johann Peter and Katharina (Wesseli) Stellhorn. He immigrated to the United States when he was twelve. His father died of cholera in Fort Wayne, Indiana, in September 1854, leaving his mother widowed with two young children. His older brother helped provide for the family. He attended German language Lutheran parochial schools in Fort Wayne. In the fall of 1855, Stellhorn entered the Practical Theological Seminary of the Lutheran Church–Missouri Synod (LCMS) in that city.

== Family life ==
Frederick married Christiane Maria, daughter of Ernst and Amalie (Weber) Buenger, in Altenburg, Missouri, on January 9, 1866. They had seven children. After her death he married Louise, daughter of Rev. Henry and Mary Louisa (Beilharz) Lang and widow of Fletcher Darst, in 1901.

== Early adulthood ==
From Fort Wayne he went to St. Louis, Missouri. to finish his classical education and three years later, in 1865, he was graduated from Concordia Seminary there. He entered the office of the Holy Ministry in the LCMS. Shortly afterward, he suffered sunstroke and had to resign his first call. He re-entered the ministry in 1867 in a small parish which allowed him to regain his strength and study academic subjects. Two years later, in 1869, he entered the Wisconsin Synod's Northwestern College in Watertown, Wisconsin, to continue his interest in classical education. Two years later in 1871 he was called to teach at Concordia College in Fort Wayne.

== Predestinarian Controversy and the Ohio Synod ==
In Fort Wayne he spent six years in the upheaval that culminated in the Predestination Controversy of 1880. He became a persona non grata due to his outspoken opposition to the leader of the LCMS, C. F. W. Walther. This disagreement led to his being invited to join the Evangelical Lutheran Joint Synod of Ohio in 1881, and he was called to Columbus, Ohio, to serve as professor of German language in Capital University and professor in the Ohio Synod's Evangelical Lutheran Theological Seminary. He also served as the housefather of the institution, but his term of office as housefather was short. To a man of his academic habits, the petty annoyances that go with that job were distasteful.

== Later life and death ==
His term of office as professor of German was long, and it was not until late in life when natural decline made it necessary for him to have less work that he was relieved. His influence in the German language department made itself felt in the synod because it was largely due to him that the late 19th and early 20th century pastors of the Ohio Synod were known to preach well in German. He continued teaching at Capital University until his death at age 78.

== Publications ==
He served as editor of the Lutherische Kirchenzeitung prior to Richard C. H. Lenski and also edited the Theologische Zeitblatter.

- Worum handelt es sich eigentlich in dem gegenwärtigen Lehrstreit über die Gnadenwahl? : für jeden lutherischen Christen einfach und deutlich beantwortet (1881).
- What is the real question in the present controversy on predestination? : a plain and clear answer for every Lutheran Christian (1881).
- Prüfung der "Beleuchtung" Hrn. Dr. Walthers (1881).
- Kurzgefasstes Woerterbuch zum Griechischen Neuen Testament (1886). (was reviewed in English)
- Brief Commentary on the New Testament (1890).
- A brief commentary on the four Gospels: for study and devotion (1891).
- Annotations On The Acts Of The Apostles (1896).
- Die Pastoralbriefe Pauli [The pastoral letters of Paul] (1899).
- Der erste Brief Pauli an Timotheum [The first letter of Paul to Timothy] (1899).
- Der Schriftbeweis des lutherischen Katechismus : Erklärung des kleinen Katechismus Luthers und der ihm zugrunde liegenden Schriftstellen [The Scriptural Proof of the Lutheran Catechism: Explanation of Luther's Small Catechism and the Scriptures on which it is based] (1912)
- The epistle of St. Paul to the Romans (1918)
