= Richard C. H. Lenski =

German Lutheran pastor (1864-1936)

The Reverend Richard C. H. Lenski
- Born: Richard Charles Henry Lenski; September 14, 1864; Greifenberg, Brandenburg-Prussia
- Died: August 14, 1936 (aged 71)
- Education: Capital University
- Children: Lois Lenski
- Church: Evangelical Lutheran Joint Synod of Ohio
- Ordained: 1887
- Writings: New Testament commentaries
- Congregations served: Baltimore, Maryland; Trenton, Springfield, and Anna, Ohio
- Offices held: President of Western district of Joint Synod of Ohio; theology professor at Capital University

Richard Charles Henry Lenski (September 14, 1864 – August 14, 1936) was a German-born American-naturalized Lutheran pastor, scholar, and author who published a series of Lutheran New Testament commentaries.

== Life ==
Lenski was born on September 14, 1864, in Greifenberg, Brandenburg-Prussia (now Gryfice, Poland). In 1872 he emigrated to the United States. He was educated at Capital University and its Theological Department, which were institutions of the Evangelical Lutheran Joint Synod of Ohio. He was ordained as a pastor in that synod in 1887, and served congregations in Baltimore, Maryland, and in Trenton, Springfield, and Anna, Ohio.

He was editor of Die Lutherische Kirchenzeitung for twenty years, beginning in 1904. In 1911, he became a professor of theology at Capital University and its theological department. He also served the Joint Synod of Ohio as president of its Western District for a number of years.

Lenski died on August 14, 1936.

== Publications ==
Lenski's major work was a 12-volume series of commentaries on the New Testament, published originally by the Lutheran Book Concern. Each contains a literal translation of the Greek texts and commentary from a traditional Lutheran perspective. Some of the volumes were published after his death.

Other works include The Active Church Member, The Eisenach Gospel Selections, The Eisenach Old Testament Selections, The Epistle Selections of the Ancient Church, The Gospel Selections of the Ancient Church, The Sermon: Its Homiletical Construction, and Saint Paul.

== Descendants ==
Lenski was the father of the author Lois Lenski, grandfather of the sociologist Gerhard Lenski, and great-grandfather of the evolutionary biologist Richard Lenski. Lenski’s descendants have attended Capital University for six generations.

== Theology ==
As a Lutheran, Lenski shows little sympathy for Reformed theology in his commentaries. Lenski had sometimes distanced himself from the Calvinism-Arminian debate. However he practically adopted the main distinctive tenets of the Arminian soteriology. Though not using the exact terminology, he held to conditional election, unlimited atonement, prevenient grace and conditional preservation of the saints.

== Notes and references ==
=== Sources ===
- Bing, Charlie (2010). "Is There Hellfire in Hebrews?". GraceLife.
- Forlines, Leroy F.; Pinson, Matthew J.; Ashby, Stephen M. (2001). The Quest for Truth: Answering Life's Inescapable Questions. Nashville: Randall House Publications.
- Henebury, Paul Martin (2009). "Personal Thoughts about Commentaries (3): ROMANS". Dr Reluctant : Musing of a "reluctant" dispensationalist.
- Lenski, Richard C. H. (2001). The Interpretation of St. Paul's Epistles to the Ephesians, and to the Philippians. Peabody: Hendrickson.
- Lenski, Richard C. H. (2008a). The Interpretation of I Corinthians. Minneapolis: Augsburg Fortress.
- Lenski, Richard C. H. (2008b). Interpretation of the I & II Epistles of Peter the Three Epistles of John and the Epistle of Jude. Minneapolis: Augsburg Fortress.
- Nicholson, J. B. (Jabe) (1999). "I Don't Care for Daises, Either". Uplook. 66 (10). Grand Rapids, MI: Uplook Ministries: 10.
- McMahon, C. Matthew (2005). The two wills of God : does God really have two wills?. New Lenox, IL: Puritan Publications.
- White, James (2001). "A Reformed Response to the Comments of R. C. H. Lenski on Romans 9". Alpha and Omega Ministries.
