= Matthias Loy =

American poet (1828–1915)

Matthias Loy (March 17, 1828 - January 26, 1915) was an American Lutheran theologian in the Evangelical Lutheran Joint Synod of Ohio. Loy was a prominent pastor, editor, author, and hymnist who served as president of Capital University in Columbus, Ohio.

== Biography ==
Matthias Loy was the fourth of seven children of Matthias and Christina Loy, immigrants from Germany who lived as tenant farmers in the Blue Mountain area of Cumberland County, Pennsylvania. In 1834, when Matthias was six years old, the family moved to Hogestown, a village nine miles (14 km) west of Harrisburg, Pennsylvania. When he was 14, he was sent as an apprentice to Baab and Hummel, printers of Harrisburg. Here he worked for six years, while attending school. He received a classical education at Harrisburg Academy and graduated from the German Theological Seminary of the Ohio Synod, a predecessor body of Trinity Lutheran Seminary, in Columbus, Ohio, in 1849.

In 1849, he entered the Lutheran ministry and became pastor at Delaware, Ohio. In 1865, he resigned his pastorate to become professor in the Theological Seminary of Capital University in Columbus. In 1881, he was elected president of Capital University. Following a critical attack of angina pectoris, he retired as professor emeritus in 1902

Loy edited the Lutheran Standard, official periodical of the Evangelical Lutheran Joint Synod of Ohio, from 1864 until 1890. In 1881, he founded the Columbus Theological Magazine and managed it for ten years. He was president of the Ohio Synod from 1860 to 1878 and again from 1880 to 1894. In 1887, Muhlenberg College awarded him the degree of Doctor of Divinity. He wrote 21 hymns and also translated a number of German hymns into the English language. He also edited a translation of Dr. Martin Luther's House Postil in three volumes (1874–1884).

He died in Columbus on January 26, 1915.

== Works ==
=== Books ===
- The Doctrine of Justification, (1862)
- Life of Luther, translated (1869)
- Essay on the Ministerial Office, (1870)
- Sermons on the Gospels, (1888)
- Christian Prayer, (1890)
- Christian Church, (1896)
- Story of My Life, (3rd ed. – 1905)
- The Augsburg Confession, (1908)
- The Sermon on the Mount, (1909)
- Sermons on the Epistles, (1910)

=== Hymns ===
- The Law of God is Good and Wise
- The Gospel Shows the Father's Grace
- An Awe-full Mystery Is Here
- Jesus, Thou Art Mine Forever
- At Jesus' Feet Our Infant Sweet

Hymns written or translated by Matthias Loy are included in a number of Lutheran hymnbooks, including The Lutheran Hymnal (1941), Service Book and Hymnal (1958), Lutheran Worship (1982), Christian Worship: A Lutheran Hymnal (1993), and Lutheran Service Book (2006).

== Other sources ==
- Matthias Loy, Leader Of Ohio's Lutherans by C. George Fry, in the Scholarly Journal of the Ohio Historical Society, Volume 76, pages 183–201. The reference notes for this article begin on page 267.
- Matthias Loy, Theologian of American Lutheran Orthodoxy by C. George Fry, in the Springfielder, October 1974, Vol 38, Number 4.
- Dr. Matthias Loy and his role in the Election Controversy by Timothy Kant (WLS Essays.net)http://essays.wisluthsem.org:8080/bitstream/handle/123456789/2443/KantLoyElectionControversy.pdf?sequence=1&isAllowed=y

== Related reading ==
- Nichol, Todd W.; Marc Kolden (2004) Called and Ordained: Lutheran Perspectives on the Office of the Ministry (Wipf and Stock Publishers) ISBN 9781592445813
- Fry, C. George; Joel R. Kurz (2005) The Americanization process in the second generation; the German Lutheran Matthias Loy (1828-1915) caught between adaptation and repristinization (Studies in religious leadership; v.2) ISBN 0-7734-6156-6
