= John Stough =

American Lutheran minister (1762–1845)

Personal life
- Born: 25 January 1762
- Died: 25 July 1845 (aged 83) Crawford County, Ohio, United States
- Other name: Johannes Stauch

Religious life
- Religion: Christianity
- Denomination: Lutheranism
- Ordination: 1804

John Stough (25 January 1762 – 25 July 1845), also known as Johannes Stauch, was a Lutheran minister and missionary who worked in Pennsylvania, western Virginia, and Ohio. He became the first president of the Ohio Synod in 1818. He organized congregations in frontier settlements and helped train other Lutheran ministers.

== Early life ==
John Stough was born on 25 January 1762. His father, Gottfried Stauch, emigrated from Württemberg to Philadelphia in 1752. John learned wagon-making in York, Pennsylvania. He then moved to Hagerstown, Maryland, where he worked and continued his studies. In 1787, Stough and his wife moved about 160 miles (260 km) west of Hagerstown. He lacked a ministerial license at that time, but still performed marriages and other clerical acts. According to historian Willard D. Allbeck, settlers asked him to perform these duties because he was "a devout man".

== Ministry in Virginia and Pennsylvania ==
In 1793, after the death of his wife, Stough returned to Hagerstown with his children. He then travelled to Philadelphia, where the Ministerium of Pennsylvania granted him a license as a catechist. A year later, in 1794, he gained a full ministerial license. It covered Redstone and nearby frontier congregations. He became an ordained pastor at Easton in 1804.

== Missionary work in Ohio ==
In 1802, Stough held religious services in Unity Township, Columbiana County, Ohio, in a cabin belonging to Adam Rupert. Subsequently, a congregation formed and a log church was built in 1803 or 1804.

In October 1806, Stough moved to Columbiana County. Before doing so, he resigned from his Pennsylvania parish due to disputes among members. He settled in Center Township. He periodically made trips to his former parish to conduct services. This lasted for two years: every four weeks during the first year and every eight weeks during the second.

Stough also ventured beyond his regular parish to serve frontier settlements. According to his journal, submitted to the Ministerium in 1807, he spent 122 days travelling, and covered 1,300 miles (2,100 km) during the preceding year.

== Church organization and leadership ==
At the Ohio Synod's first convention, held in the village of Somerset in 1818, Stough was elected president. He served as president six times.

Stough helped prepare and instruct other men for the ministry. Both John Henry Huet and John Rinehart received instruction from him, while Abraham Schneider was directed by the synod to study under his supervision in 1815.

== Religious views ==
Allbeck described Stough's early religious training as pietistic and emphasized his focus on preaching to frontier settlements. Stough frequently cooperated with German Reformed Christians.

== Later life and death ==
In 1828, Stough retired from active ministry in Columbiana County. He then moved to Crawford County, Ohio, where he purchased land adjoining his son's farm. He died in Crawford County on 25 July 1845.
