= Abraham Bäck =

Swedish physician

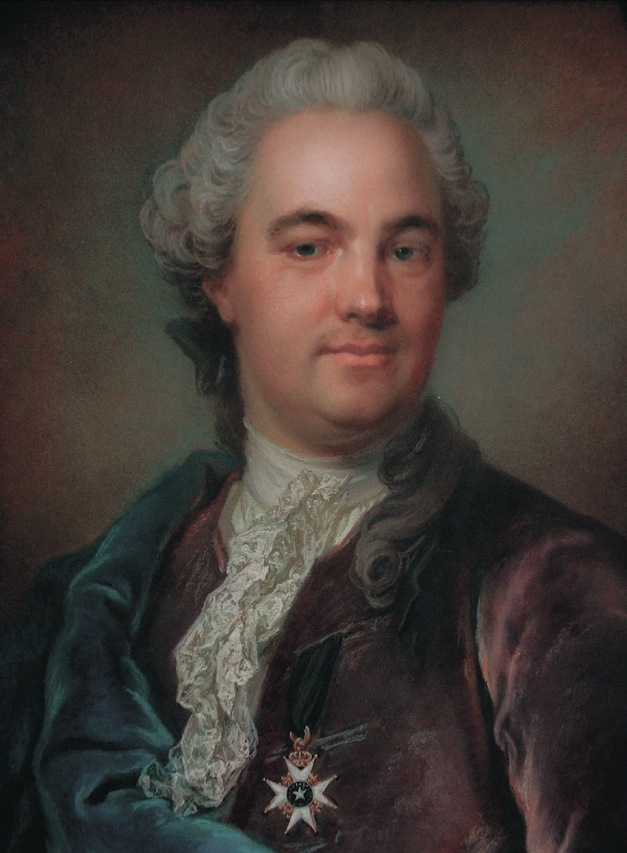
- Abraham Bäck
- Born: 1713; Söderhamn, Sweden
- Died: 15 March 1795 (aged 81–82); Stockholm, Sweden

Abraham Bäck (9 December 1713 – 21 May 1795) was a Swedish physician who is considered an important reformer of Swedish medical training and the organisation of Swedish medical practice.

== Biography ==
Bäck commenced his studies at Uppsala University in 1730 with the intention to study for the priesthood. However, an anatomical demonstration inspired him to study medicine instead and he became doctor of medicine in 1740 with a thesis on tuberculosis. In his old age, Bäck commented that medical teaching in Uppsala was in a sorry state during the latter part of the tenure of Olof Rudbeck the Younger and Lars Roberg. He also opined that the presence of Nils Rosén von Rosenstein, who taught from 1731 and became professor in 1740, led to a great improvement. Under Rosén von Rosenstein, Bäck's medical studies had a contemporary content and an empirical focus.

Bäck conducted studies abroad from 1741 to 1745. He started his own medical practice in Stockholm in 1745 after he had failed to get an academic position in Uppsala or Lund. In 1747 he was tasked by the Collegium medicum, the college of physicians, to conduct public lectures in anatomy in Stockholm and in 1749 he became professor of anatomy. He became a junior court physician in 1748 and the queen's physician in 1773. Following his foreign visits, he and Olof Acrel advocated the establishment of a modern hospital in 1746. From Bäck's point of view, such a hospital would lead to improved medical education, and remove the necessity for young Swedish physician to travel abroad to gather sufficient experience. After some delay Serafimerlasarettet, Sweden's first modern hospital, opened in 1752, and Bäck worked as a physician there. However, he also became archiater and president of the Collegium medicum in late 1752, which meant that he had to leave the hospital in 1753.

He was a close friend of Carl Linnaeus and became a member of the Royal Swedish Academy of Sciences in 1742.

Bäck was an early member of Pro Fide et Christianismo, a Christian education society.
