= Nelson Wesley Trout =

American Lutheran bishop (1921–1996)

Nelson Wesley Trout (1921–1996) was the first African-American bishop in the Evangelical Lutheran Church in America.

Trout was born in Columbus, Ohio, USA. His mother was a preacher and he was educated at Capital University and Trinity Lutheran Seminary.

Trout was known for his powerful preaching. During his earlier career, he served pastorates in Alabama (where he became a friend and colleague of Martin Luther King Jr.), California and Wisconsin, and as Executive Director of Lutheran Social Services, Dayton, Ohio. On two occasions he served the ALC in executive capacities: as Associate Youth Director (1962–67) and Director of Urban Evangelism (1968–70).

Trout was elected bishop of the South Pacific District of the American Lutheran Church (ALC) in 1983, a position he served through 1987. At the time of his election he was a professor and director of minority studies at Trinity Lutheran Seminary, Columbus, Ohio.

In 1991, Trinity Seminary set up the ‘Nelson W. Trout Lectureship in Preaching’ in his honour.

Trout died in 1996 at the age of 75. He is commemorated in the Calendar of Saints of the Evangelical Lutheran Church in America on September 20.
