= Israel Acrelius =

Swedish Lutheran missionary and priest

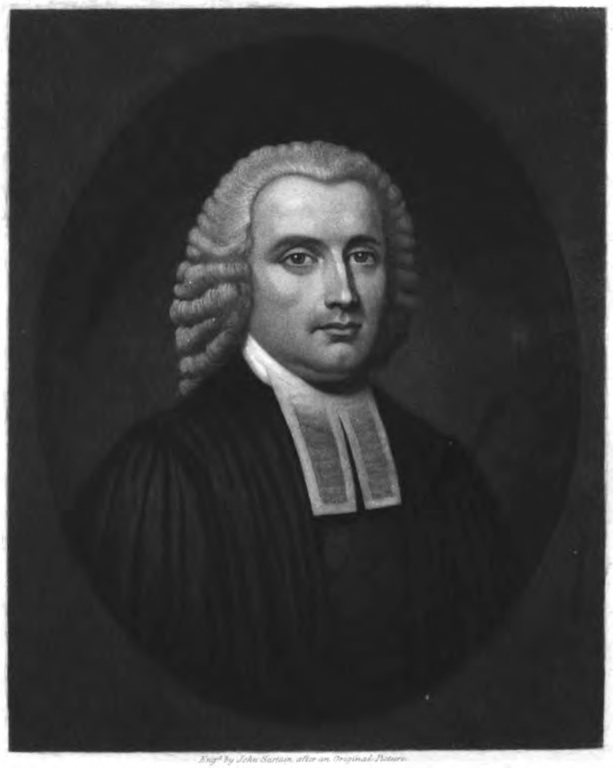
- Born: December 4, 1714; Österåker, Sweden
- Died: April 25, 1800 (aged 85); Fellingsbro, Sweden
- Religion: Lutheran

Israel Acrelius (December 4, 1714 – April 25, 1800) was a noted Swedish Lutheran missionary and priest.

== Early life and education ==
He was born in Österåker, Stockholm County, Sweden, in 1714 to Johan and Sara Acrelius (née Gahm). His brother was the surgeon Olof af Acrel. He attended Uppsala University and was ordained as a priest of the Church of Sweden in 1743. He served as the pastor of churches in Riala, Sweden starting in 1745.

== Ministry ==
Acrelius served simultaneously as both pastor and provost to the Swedish congregations in the area. He was a minister at St. Paul's Church in Chester, Pennsylvania in 1756.

He learned English and provided aid to German Lutherans in Pennsylvania. He also made notable zoological, botanical, and geological collections.

Because of health concerns, Acrelius returned to Sweden in 1756. The king gave him a large pension, and he received the lucrative pastorate of a church in the parish of Fellingsbro in the province of Västmanland during 1758. Shortly thereafter in 1759, he published his History of New Sweden, which dealt with the religious and secular history of the area. This book was translated into English by William Morton Reynolds, who learnt Swedish for the purpose, and published in 1874.
