= Centre Township, Pennsylvania =

Centre Township is the name of some places in the U.S. state of Pennsylvania:

- Centre Township, Berks County, Pennsylvania
- Centre Township, Perry County, Pennsylvania
- Centre Township, later split into North Centre Township and South Centre Township in Columbia County

== See also ==
- North Centre Township, Pennsylvania
- South Centre Township, Pennsylvania
- Center Township, Pennsylvania (disambiguation)
