= William Morton Reynolds =

American translator of hymns and religious works

William Morton Reynolds (4 March 1812 – 5 September 1876) was a Lutheran and later Episcopal minister in the United States, professor of Latin, and President of Capital University at Columbus, Ohio, and of the Illinois State University.

He was also a translator of hymns and religious works, from several languages, including German and Swedish, into English.

== Life ==
Reynolds was born at Little Falls, Fayette County, Ohio, in 1812, shortly before the outbreak of the War of 1812.

After his graduation from the small Jefferson College at Canonsburg, Pennsylvania, and the Lutheran Theological Seminary at Gettysburg, Reynolds became a minister of the Lutheran Church and for some eighteen years served as professor of Latin at the new Pennsylvania College, Gettysburg, founded in 1832.

In May 1848, Reynolds gave an address at Gettysburg to the Historical Association of the Lutheran Church of America, on the subject of "The Swedish Church in America," after which the Association resolved "that Professor Reynolds be requested to furnish for publication a copy of his valuable discourse, delivered this evening..." He spent much time responding to this instruction, and became fascinated by the subject. When the work was printed in 1849, Reynolds announced that he was planning to learn Swedish, in order to complete the translation of a History of New Sweden, by Israel Acrelius, which had been begun by the late Dr Nicholas Collin. He completed this work in 1874.

In 1850, he moved on to become the first president of the newly renamed Capital University at Columbus, Ohio, previously called the Theological Seminary of the Evangelical Lutheran Synod of Ohio, where he stayed until 1853. In May 1851, Reynolds was visited there by Lars Paul Esbjörn, accompanied by the young Eric Norelius, who stayed on to become a student at the Capital University.

Reynolds was a translator of hymns from German into English, and some of them appear in Hymns, Original and Selected, for Public and Private Worship, in the Evangelical Lutheran Church (1851), which he edited. He also made translations from Dutch, Icelandic, and Italian.

In 1853, Reynolds accepted the position of principal of a seminary for women in Easton, Pennsylvania, then from 1857 was president of a classical academy in Allentown, Pennsylvania and then from 1862 to 1864 headed the Illinois State University at Springfield. In 1864 he switched his allegiance from the Lutherans to become a priest of the Episcopal Church, and moving on again to head a seminary for women in Chicago, explaining that his only motive for becoming an Episcopalian was that in the Lutheran Church doors had been closed against him. In 1872 he was appointed as Rector of Christ Church, Harlem, in Oak Park, Illinois, his final position.

Reynolds became seriously ill in August 1876 and died at home in Oak Park on 5 September, after twenty days of great pain, suffered with resignation.

== Publications ==
- William Morton Reynolds, The Swedish Church in America: Discourse Delivered Before the Historical Society of the American Lutheran Church May 18th, 1848 (Gettysburg: H. C. Neinstedt, 1849), full text online at Google books
- William M. Reynolds, ed., Hymns, Original and Selected, for Public and Private Worship, in the Evangelical Lutheran Church (1851)
- Israel Acrelius, A History of New Sweden; or, the Settlements on the Delaware River, translated by William M. Reynolds (Philadelphia: Memoirs of the Historical Society of Pennsylvania, vol. 11, 1874)

== See also ==
- Nun komm, der Heiden Heiland
