= Blanche Margaret Milligan =

Blanche Margaret Milligan was an early 20th century American author of books for pre-teen and teenage readers. Her books were published by the Lutheran Book Concern (Evangelical Lutheran Joint Synod of Ohio), which was established in 1881 in Columbus, Ohio, and which became a part of the American Lutheran Church in 1930. The books feature stories and adventures of young characters who learn the love of God through everyday occurrences.

== Bibliography ==
- Mystery Island. A Story for Junior Boys and Girls (1932)
- Two Young Patriots: A Story of the Days of the American Revolution (1915)
- A Christmas Surprise (1916)
- The Lost Twins: A Story for Junior Boys and Girls
- The School in the Valley (1921)
- Victories in the Wildwood (1917)
- Matilda (1916)
- The Helpful Dozen (1929)
- At Camp in Old Virginia
