= Paul Henkel =

American evangelist

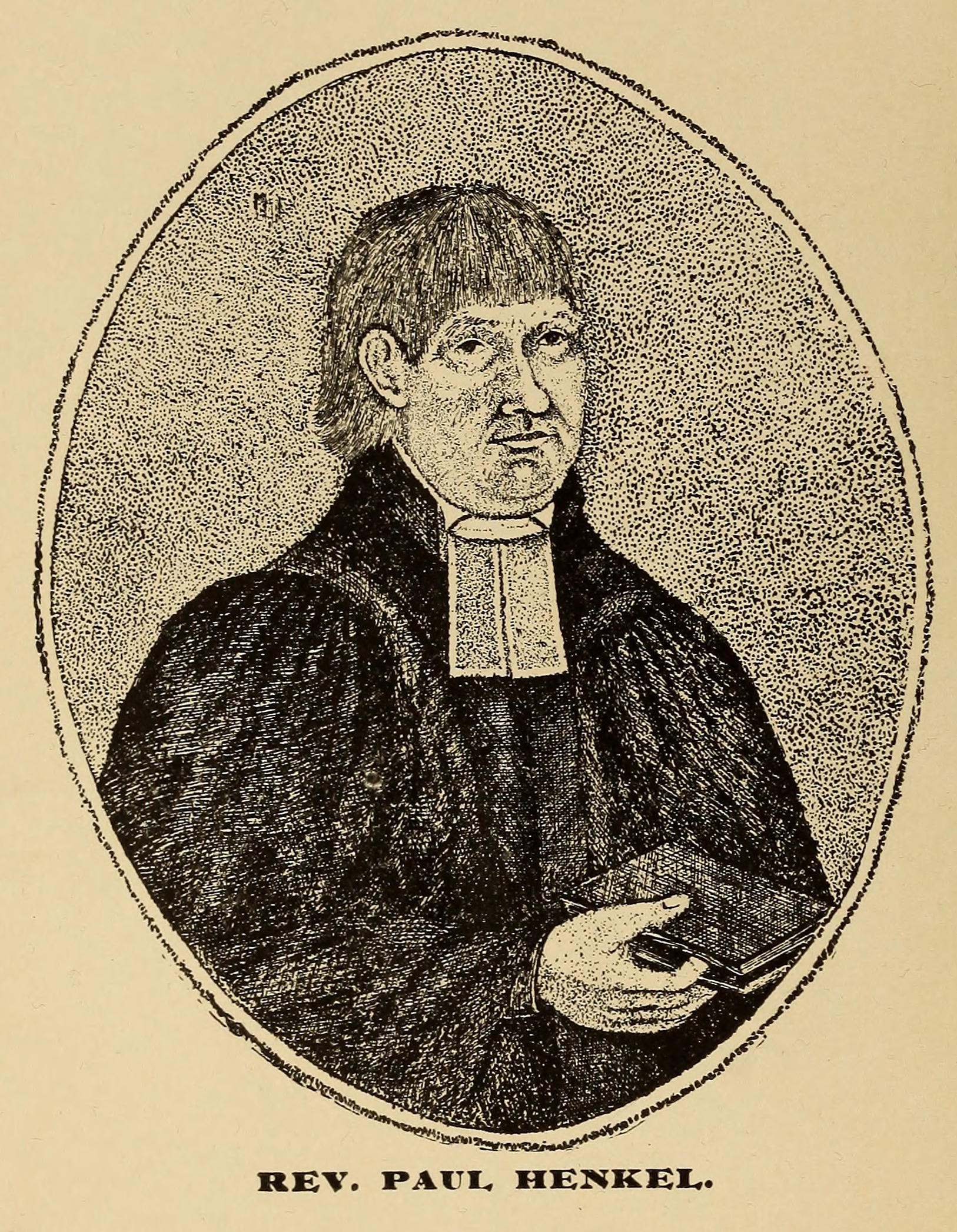
- Born: December 15, 1754; Rowan County, North Carolina
- Died: November 27, 1825 (aged 70); New Market, Virginia
- Occupation: Pastor
- Years active: 1781–1825
- Religion: Lutheran
- Ordained: 1792

Paul Henkel (December 15, 1754 – November 27, 1825) was a native of North Carolina who became an itinerant evangelist for the Lutheran Church in the eastern United States.

He was born in Rowan County, North Carolina, in 1754. His family moved to what is now West Virginia while he was still young. In that environment, he developed a solid acquaintance with orthodox Lutheran works. He grew to become a cooper by trade, and was obliged to provide enough for his substantial family. Despite these demands on his time, he always gave his highest priority to conducting religious services. He took advantage of the numerous prayer meetings and Bible classes in his area to help him focus on spiritual values.

By 1781, he preached his first sermon, first in German, then in English. This began a period of missionary work which would continue for the next forty years. He was licensed as a preacher by the Ministerium of Pennsylvania in 1783 to begin his work, being ordained by the same body in 1792. He worked in the area of Virginia, North Carolina, Tennessee, Kentucky, Ohio, and Indiana. Although he did receive some financial assistance for his missionary work, the majority of the expenses were paid for out of his own pocket. His work included preaching, baptizing, and creating new congregations in the communities he visited. He also worked to organize clergy for the organization and administrative purposes. He helped to found the North Carolina Synod in 1803. This group helped provide discipline and moral support for the people of the area, and also helped its members withstand the great degree of emotionalism which was a regular feature of several revival movements of the time.

He returned to Virginia in 1806. There, he began distributing books through his sons' printing house, the Henkel Press, which thus became the only Lutheran publishing house in the country for many years. He also continued his missionary travels, and helped form the Evangelical Lutheran Joint Synod of Ohio in 1818 and the Evangelical Lutheran Tennessee Synod in 1820. He used his prominence to help argue against the ideas of Samuel Simon Schmucker, which he considered far too liberal. Henkel actively resisted cooperating with Schmucker in his hope of uniting all the evangelical churches, as he was staunchly opposed to the appearance of ideological compromise which he thought would be given by such an alliance. His strict adherence to the traditional doctrine, including the Augsburg Confession, served as one of the basis for the strong confessional movement which would later flourish in many parts of the North American Lutheran community.

A paralytic stroke Henkel suffered in 1823 substantially limited his activities. He did however remain an active preacher and writer until just six weeks before his death in 1825.
