= Carl Christian Hein =

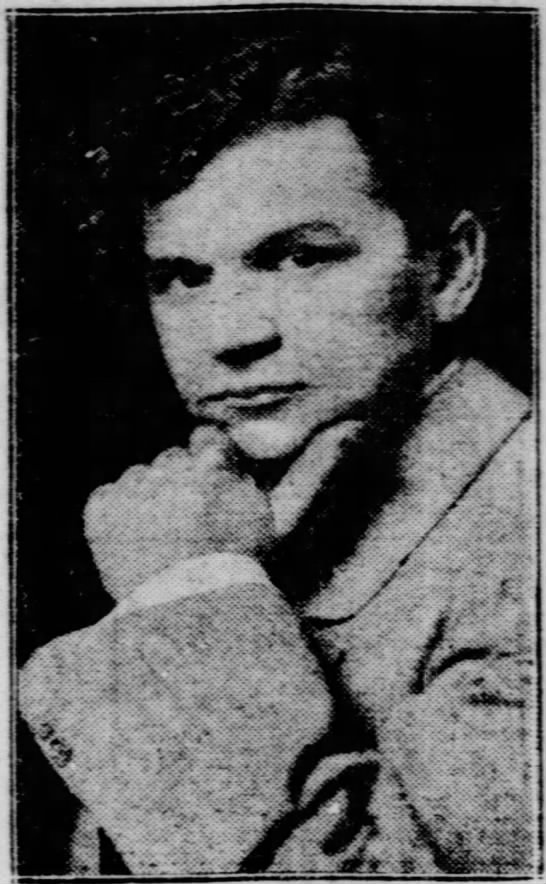
- Born: August 31, 1868; Wiesbaden, Germany
- Died: April 30, 1937 (aged 68)
- Church: Evangelical Lutheran Joint Synod of Ohio; American Lutheran Church
- Congregations served: Marion, Wisconsin; Detroit, Michigan; Columbus, Ohio
- Offices held: President, Joint Synod of Ohio (1924-1930) and ALC (1931-1937)

Carl Christian Hein (August 31, 1868 – April 30, 1937) was an American Lutheran clergyman.

Born in Wiesbaden, Germany, Hein moved to the United States in 1884. He became pastor of a Lutheran church in Marion, Wisconsin, in 1889, and then moved to Detroit, Michigan, in 1891, where he became pastor of a church there. He moved again to Columbus, Ohio, in 1902, where he pastored a church there for twenty-three years.

In 1924 he was elected president of the Evangelical Lutheran Joint Synod of Ohio, that organization's last president. He became the first president of the American Lutheran Church in 1931, and held that position until his death. He opposed a suggested merger between the American Lutheran Church and the United Lutheran Church in America due to his group's opposition to joining Masonic Lodges, which the ULCA tolerated.
