= Olof af Acrel =

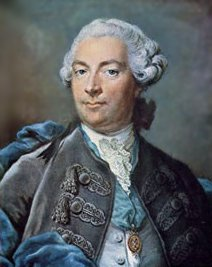

Olof af Acrel (26 November 1717 – 28 May 1806), known before his ennoblement in 1780 as Olof Acrel, was a surgeon and physician of Stockholm, who perfected his knowledge by study in foreign countries and introduced many improvements into Swedish practice.

Olof af Acrel was born at Österåker, and was the brother of the missionary Israel Acrelius. After attending Uppsala University for two years, he trained as a surgeon in Stockholm. From 1740, he spent several years in Germany and France, studying at the University of Göttingen under Albrecht von Haller and also in Paris and Strasbourg. In 1743, during the War of the Austrian Succession, he was appointed acting chief surgeon at a French military hospital in Lauterbourg, Alsace. A year later, the town was captured by German troops and, after being briefly imprisoned, Acrel returned to Sweden.

In 1752, he was appointed chief surgeon of the newly founded Seraphim Hospital in Stockholm, and as professor of surgery in 1755. He was awarded a doctorate of medicine by Uppsala University in 1760.

Acrel's discourse on the Reforms necessary in Surgical Operations made a deep impression. So did his other works, On the Mode of Treating Recent Wounds; On Surgery in general; and On the Cataract of the Eye. He received many honours in recognition of his work.

He was elected a member of the Royal Swedish Academy of Sciences in 1746. He died in Stockholm.
