= Kevin R. Griffith =

American poet and short fiction writer (born 1964)

- Born: January 22, 1964 (age 62); Adrian, Michigan, U.S.
- Occupations: writer, professor

Kevin R. Griffith (born January 22, 1964) is an American poet and short fiction writer. He has published several books and currently teaches English at Capital University in Bexley, Ohio. In addition to his books, he has had over two hundred poems published over the last twenty years.

Griffith was born and raised in Adrian, Michigan and would eventually go to Ohio State University. It was there he discovered poetry and writing. In 1992 he graduated from college with a Ph.D. in English. The following year, he wrote his first book, Someone Had to Live, which went on to win the American Book Series.

== Capital University ==
Griffith began teaching at Capital University in 1994. Currently he teaches Creative Writing, Fiction Writing, Poetry Writing, the English Language, Critical Writing, and Humanities. He is also the adviser for the University's literary magazine the ReCap, and the Capital University Creative Writing Club. Griffith's teaching style is consistently praised for his passion for teaching and his use of humor to keep class interesting.

== Poetry, awards, and short fiction ==
Griffith has won several awards for his poetry, including the American Book Series for Someone Had To Live, the Backwater Prize for Paradise Refunded, and the Pearl Poetry Prize for Denmark, Kangaroo, Orange. He has had poems appear in over one hundred publications as well. In addition, Griffith has had ten short stories published in the last few years. His publications appear in Hotel Amerika, Spectrum (magazine), Mid-American Review and others.

== Bibliography ==
Poetry

Someone Had To Live (1993)

Paradise Refunded (1998)

Denmark, Kangaroo, Orange (2007)

101 Kinds of Irony (2012)

Chapbooks

Labors

Manigault's Hunger

As Editor

The Common Courage Reader: Essays for an Informed Democracy (2002)
