= American Lutheran Church (1930) =

Defunct Christian denomination in the United States

- Classification: Protestant
- Orientation: Lutheran
- Theology: Confessional Lutheran
- Structure: National synod, middle level districts, and local congregations
- Region: United States and Canada
- Headquarters: Columbus, Ohio
- Origin: 1930
- Merger of: Joint Synod of Ohio, Iowa Synod, and Buffalo Synod
- Merged into: American Lutheran Church (1960)
- Congregations: 1,961 (1959)
- Members: 1,002,015 (1959)
- Ministers: 2,156 (1959)

The American Lutheran Church (ALC) was formed in 1930 from the merger of the three conservative Lutheran synods of German-American origin: The Evangelical Lutheran Synod of Iowa and Other States (Iowa Synod), established in 1854; the Lutheran Synod of Buffalo, established in 1845; and the Evangelical Lutheran Joint Synod of Ohio and Other States (Joint Synod of Ohio), established in 1818 from the Ministerium of Pennsylvania. The headquarters of the ALC were in Columbus, Ohio, which had been the headquarters of the Joint Synod of Ohio, the largest of the three synods.

In 1960, the ALC merged with the Evangelical Lutheran Church, which was of Norwegian-American origin, and the United Evangelical Lutheran Church, of Danish-American origin, to form a new body that was also named the American Lutheran Church. After the merger the original ALC was informally referred to as the "old American Lutheran Church" or the "first American Lutheran Church" to distinguish it from the later body, while the second was often referred to as "The American Lutheran Church" (or TALC), with a capital "T" in the definitive article.

In 1959, just before its merger into the TALC, the ALC had 2,156 pastors, 1,961 congregations, and 1,002,015 members.

== Presidents ==
- Carl Christian Hein 1930–1937
- Emmanuel F. Poppen 1937–1950
- Henry F. Schuh 1951–1960

== Colleges ==
- Capital University, Bexley, Columbus, Ohio
- Wartburg College, Waverly, Iowa
- Texas Lutheran University, Seguin, Texas
- Luther College (Saskatchewan), Regina, Saskatchewan, Canada

== Seminaries ==
- The Evangelical Lutheran Theological Seminary, founded 1830 (also known as Capital Seminary) in Bexley, a suburb of Columbus, Ohio, which merged in 1978 with the Hamma Divinity School of Wittenberg University in Springfield, Ohio (an LCA seminary), into the present Trinity Lutheran Seminary
- Wartburg Theological Seminary in Dubuque, Iowa
- Luther Seminary, St. Paul, Minnesota
- Pacific Lutheran Theological Seminary, Berkeley, California
