= Center Township, Pennsylvania =

Center Township is the name of some places in the U.S. state of Pennsylvania:

- Center Township, Beaver County, Pennsylvania
- Center Township, Butler County, Pennsylvania
- Center Township, Greene County, Pennsylvania
- Center Township, Indiana County, Pennsylvania
- Center Township, Snyder County, Pennsylvania

See also:

- Centre Township, Pennsylvania (disambiguation)
