= Susan Firer =

American poet (1948–2025)

Susan Firer (October 14, 1948 – September 5, 2025) was an American poet. She was poet laureate of Milwaukee from 2008 to 2010, and from 2008 to 2014 she edited the Shepherd Express online poetry column.

== Life and career ==
Firer grew up along the southwestern shore of Lake Michigan in Milwaukee, WI. She received her MA from the University of Wisconsin-Milwaukee. She was Adjunct Associate Professor Emeritus at the University of Wisconsin-Milwaukee. In addition to publishing six full-length books, she has contributed to numerous local and national literary magazines and anthologies, including Best American Poetry 1992; Visiting Dr. Williams: Poems Inspired by the Life and Work of William Carlos Williams (University of Iowa Press); The Cento: A Collection of Collage Poems (Red Hen Press); and The Book of Irish American Poetry: From the Eighteenth Century to the Present (University of Notre Dame Press). Her poems have appeared in many journals, including The New Yorker, The New York Times Sunday Magazine, Ms. (magazine), Chicago Tribune, Chicago Review, jubilat, The Georgia Review, The Iowa Review, New American Writing. Her poem "Call Me Pier" is included in the Poetry Everywhere series. Firer along with James Hazard, Bob Budny, and Jerome Kitzke performed as The Great Lakes Poem Band, a collaborative effort combining poetry and music. Sigmund Snopek has composed a song cycle based on three of Firer's poems. Most recently, two of her poems were used as texts for dance pieces choreographed by University of North Carolina at Greensboro's Head of the Department of Dance, Janet Lilly, and performed at St. Mark's Church-in-the-Bowery. Firer died on September 5, 2025, at the age of 76.

== Critical reviews ==
Billy Collins has said, "To read the poetry of Susan Firer is to enter a unique building constructed by the imagination, like Kubla Khan's pleasure-dome, out of the shimmering material of words. These poems reveal a love of language both for its own dear sake and for its ability to deliver the news some of us cannot live without." Wendy Vardaman similarly praises Firer's work: "Firer’s rich poetry—powerful and beautiful—creates a house whose rooms, by turns restful and invigorating, you will want to admire, borrow from, and revisit."

== Books ==
- The Transit Of Venus, Backwaters Press, 2016
- Milwaukee Does Strange Things To People: New And Selected Poems 1979-2007, Backwaters Press, 2007
- The Laugh We Make When We Fall, Backwaters Press, 2002
- The Lives of the Saints and Everything, Cleveland State University Press, 1993
- The Underground Communion Rail, West End Press, 1992
- My Life with the Tsar and Other Poems, New Rivers Press, 1979

== Awards ==
- NEA Fellowship, 2015
- University of Wisconsin Distinguished Alumnus, 2009
- Council for Wisconsin Writers Lorine Niedecker Poetry Award, 2009
- Milwaukee Poet Laureate, 2008-2010
- Backwaters Prize, 2001
- Milwaukee County Artist Award, 1996
- Council for Wisconsin Writers Posner Award, 1993
- Cleveland Poetry Prize, 1992
- Wisconsin Arts Board Fellowship, 1979
