= Johannes Andreas August Grabau =

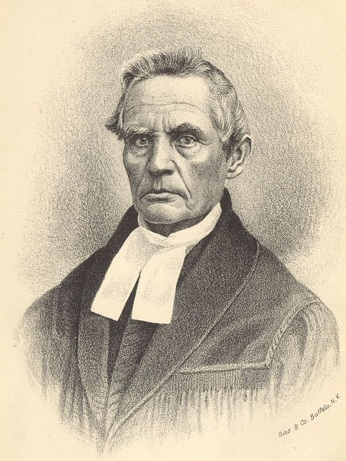
- Born: March 18, 1804; Olvenstedt, Prussia
- Died: June 2, 1879 (aged 75); Buffalo, New York, United States
- Education: University of Halle
- Occupation(s): Old Lutheran pastor and theologian
- Spouse: Christine Sophia Burgraf
- Children: Johann, Wilhelm, Beata
- Parent(s): Johann Andreas Grabau and Anna Dorothea Jericho

Johannes Andreas August Grabau (March 18, 1804—June 2, 1879) was an influential German-American Old Lutheran pastor and theologian. He is usually mentioned as J. A. A. Grabau.

Grabau was born in Olvenstedt, Prussia (now a part of greater Magdeburg, Germany). He was the son of Johann Andreas Grabau and Anna Dorothea Jericho. Grabau was educated at the grammar school in Olvenstedt (1809–1818), the Magdeburg Gymnasium (1818–1825) and at the University of Halle (1825–1829).

After three years as a teacher in Magdeburg and Sachsa bei Nordhausen, Grabau was ordained and installed as pastor of St. Andrew's Church in Erfurt in June 1834. Grabau was jailed twice for refusing to use the Prussian union Agenda and was permitted to immigrate to America in summer 1839 with members of Lutheran congregations in Erfurt and Magdeburg. They settled in Buffalo, New York, where he served as pastor of a Lutheran congregation for 40 years. On July 15, 1845, along with four pastors, Grabau founded "The Synod of the Lutheran Church emigrated from Prussia" (German: Synode der aus Preussen ausgewanderten lutherischen Kirche) which became known as the Buffalo Synod. Grabau also founded the Martin Luther College in Buffalo. Grabau retained control of the Martin Luther College and remained as its rector. The official organ of Grabau's synod after 1866 was Die Wachende Kirche, under his editorship.

Grabau was married on July 15, 1834, to Christine Sophia Burgraf, the daughter of Johann Andreas Burggraf and Friedericke Louise Elizabeth Beulke. They had at least three children: Johann, Wilhelm, and Beata. Grabau died on June 2, 1879, in Buffalo, New York, shortly before the 40th anniversary of his arrival in the United States.

== Other sources ==
- Clifford E. Nelson, Lutherans in North America (Minneapolis, MN: Augsburg Fortress Publishers. 1980)
