= Evangelical Lutheran Joint Synod of Ohio =

Defunct Christian denomination in the United States

Evangelical Lutheran Joint Synod of Ohio and Other States
- Abbreviation: Ohio Synod, Joint Synod of Ohio
- Classification: Protestant
- Orientation: Lutheran
- Theology: Confessional Lutheran
- Structure: National synod, middle level districts, and local congregations
- Associations: National Lutheran Council; Former member of Synodical Conference
- Region: United States, especially in Ohio and nearby states.
- Headquarters: Columbus, Ohio
- Origin: September 14, 1818; Somerset, Ohio
- Branched from: Pennsylvania Ministerium (Ministerium of Pennsylvania)
- Separations: English District Synod
- Merged into: American Lutheran Church (1930-1960)
- Congregations: 876 (1929)
- Members: 166,521 (1929)
- Ministers: 768 (1929)

The Evangelical Lutheran Joint Synod of Ohio and Other States, commonly known as the Joint Synod of Ohio or the Ohio Synod, was a German-language Lutheran denomination whose congregations were originally located primarily in the U.S. state of Ohio, later expanding to most parts of the United States. The synod was formed on September 14, 1818, and adopted the name Evangelical Lutheran Joint Synod of Ohio and Other States by about 1850. It used that name or slight variants until it merged with the Iowa Synod and the Buffalo Synod in 1930 to form the first American Lutheran Church (ALC), 1930–1960.

In 1929, just before its merger into the ALC, the Ohio Joint Synod had 768 pastors, 876 congregations, and 166,521 members.

== History ==
=== Origin and names ===
During the 1780s and 1790s, German-speaking Lutherans began to move west from the original 13 states on the Atlantic coast into the portion of the old Northwest Territory that is now the state of Ohio, with the numbers increasing after Ohio gained statehood in 1803. The Pennsylvania Ministerium sent two itinerant Lutheran pastors, Wilhelm Georg Forster and Johannes Stauch, to minister to the immigrants. By 1818, the Ministerium had sent another ten pastors, including Paul Henkel and John Michael Steck. These pastors began meeting together as the Ohio Conference of the Pennsylvania Ministerium, with the first convention on October 17–19, 1812, in Washington County, Pennsylvania. and the last on September 20–24, 1817, in New Philadelphia, Ohio. However, the Ohio Conference was not an independent synod, so any candidates for the pastoral office were required to travel to Pennsylvania for ordination. Most candidates found it difficult to make that trip across the Appalachian Mountains, so the Ohio Conference instead merely licensed them to preach. To remedy this problem, the conference asked for and received permission from the Pennsylvania Ministerium to form a new synod, and on September 14, 1818, in Somerset, Ohio, the General Council of the Evangelical Lutheran Preachers in Ohio and the Adjacent States (German: General Conferenz der Evangelisch-Lutherischen Prediger in Ohio und den angrenzenden Staaten) was organized.

The synod was known under several other names during its history, including the German Evangelical Lutheran Ministerium in Ohio and the Neighboring States (German: Das Deutsche Evangelisch Lutherische Ministerium in Ohio und den benachbarten Staaten) from 1818 to 1849, and the Synod and Ministerium of the Evangelical Lutheran Church in the State of Ohio from 1830 to 1843. It finally adopted the name Evangelical Lutheran Joint Synod of Ohio and Other States by about 1850, and used that name or slight variants thereafter. The term "Joint Synod" reflected the division of the synod into Eastern and Western districts or "district synods" in 1831, and the organization of a non-geographical English District in 1836 to assist the increasing numbers of English-speaking ministers, congregations, and members.

=== Theological development ===
The theology of the Ohio Synod was initially shaped by that of the Pennsylvania Ministerium and the Tennessee Synod, and by unionism and the New Measures of the Second Great Awakening. In 1820, the synod discussed joining the Evangelical Lutheran General Synod being organized, but, for "practical reasons" rather than theological ones, decided not to. The establishment of relations with Johann Konrad Wilhelm Löhe and the immigration of additional Lutheran pastors from the German Confederation in the early 1840s resulted in an increasing conservative movement with the synod taking a stronger stance in support of the Lutheran doctrinal confessions contained in the Book of Concord of 1580.

The English District that had been formed in 1836 underwent a number of divisions. Organized in Somerset, Ohio, as a district synod of the Ohio Synod, it was originally called the Synod and Ministerium of the English Evangelical Lutheran Churches in Ohio and Adjacent States (and later, the English Evangelical Lutheran Synod and Ministerium of Ohio and Adjacent States). By the terms of its creation, it was not allowed to join another synod without the permission of the Ohio Synod. However, the majority of its congregations severed their connection with the Ohio Synod in 1840 and joined the General Synod in 1844. The district minority continued to operate in association with the Ohio Synod until 1855, when a majority of the minority also broke ties and joined the General Synod as the English Synod and Ministerium. The remaining minority formed a new district synod of the Ohio Synod at Circleville, Ohio, in 1857, but it then joined the General Council in 1867 without the approval of the Ohio Synod, and broke ties with the Ohio Synod in 1869. Again, a minority decided to remain with the Ohio Synod and formed a new English district synod.

=== General Council ===
In 1866, the Pennsylvania Ministerium proposed a union of Lutheran synods to a number of conservative synods, including the Ohio Synod, that were dissatisfied with the theological direction being taken in the General Synod. Ten of those synods adopted a proposed constitution and in a convention on November 20, 1867, in Fort Wayne, Indiana, established the General Council of the Evangelical Lutheran Church in North America. The Ohio Synod sent representatives to the convention, but declined membership until differences on certain points of doctrine could be addressed. Those so-called Four Points, all of which the Ohio Synod opposed, concerned the teaching of millennialism, allowing non-Lutherans to commune at Lutheran altars, allowing non-Lutheran ministers to preach in Lutheran pulpits, and permitting Lutherans to hold membership in Masonic and other secret societies. Failure to reach agreement with the General Council on these points led the Ohio Joint Synod to look elsewhere for affiliations and allies.

=== Synodical Conference ===
In October 1870, the Joint Synod of Ohio contacted several of the conservative Midwestern Lutheran synods that opposed the General Synod and had either never joined the General Council or had withdrawn from it, to discuss the possibility of a union. This led to the Joint Synod of Ohio, the Missouri Synod, the Wisconsin Synod, the Minnesota Synod, the Illinois Synod, and the Norwegian Synod forming the Evangelical Lutheran Synodical Conference of North America, on July 10–16, 1872, in Milwaukee, Wisconsin. However, in 1881, less than a decade later, the "Predestination Controversy" led to the Ohio Synod leaving the Synodical Conference. In that controversy the Ohio and Norwegian synods held that God elects people to salvation "in view of the faith" (Latin: intuitu fidei) he foresaw they would have, while the Missouri and Wisconsin synods held that the cause is wholly due to God's grace. Efforts made between 1903 and 1929 to reach agreement on the issue were ultimately unsuccessful. During this time, Frederick William Stellhorn left the Missouri Synod to become a seminary professor in the Ohio Synod.

A group of congregations within the Ohio Synod disagreed with the synod's position on the controversy and left to form the Evangelical Lutheran Concordia Synod of Pennsylvania and Other States, joined the Synodical Conference in 1882, and merged into the Missouri Synod in 1886.

By the 1910s, administrative offices for the synod with a president and a few secretaries and staff had been established in Columbus, Ohio, near its publishing house and Evangelical Lutheran Theological Seminary (1830) and affiliated Capital University (1850).

Beginning in 1917 during the outbreak of World War I, anti-German and xenophobic sentiment grew in the Midwest, causing the majority of Ohio Synod churches to cease conducting services in German, and the Luther Seminary in Saint Paul to stop instructing in the language.

=== Mergers ===
During the discussions with the Missouri and Wisconsin synods, the Ohio Joint Synod continued to work with the smaller Iowa and Buffalo synods that were also largely composed of German-American Lutherans in the Midwest. In 1930, those three synods merged to form the American Lutheran Church (1930–1960), headquartered in Columbus, Ohio. After three decades of existence, the first ALC led the movement for a first multi-ethnic union in 1960 with the Evangelical Lutheran Church (mainly Norwegian-American Lutherans) and the United Evangelical Lutheran Church (mainly Danish-American Lutherans) to form a new body named similarly as The American Lutheran Church (The ALC), with headquarters in Minneapolis, Minnesota. The Lutheran Free Church joined in the new ALC in 1963. In 1988, after only 28 years of existence, the second ALC body merged with the eastern-based Lutheran Church in America (which itself was a 1962 union of four smaller various ethnic-based synods) and the Association of Evangelical Lutheran Churches (which was a theological split from the Missouri Synod in 1974–1976) to form the current Evangelical Lutheran Church in America which has about two-thirds of American Lutherans.

== Seminaries and colleges ==
In 1830, the synod instituted its Theological Seminary in Canton, Ohio, with two students in attendance. A year later the seminary was relocated to Columbus, Ohio. Growth in the range of subjects offered led to the division of the institution into two parts. The non-theological secular programs became Capital University (chartered in 1850) at Columbus' Bexley suburb, and the seminary was renamed as the Evangelical Lutheran Theological Seminary. The Theological Seminary continued to serve as a seminary of the Joint Synod of Ohio's successor church bodies, the first and second instances of the American Lutheran Church (1930–1960 and 1960–1988). In 1978, it merged with the Hamma Divinity School, which was the theological department of Wittenberg University in Springfield, Ohio, and associated with the Lutheran Church in America, to form today's Trinity Lutheran Seminary in Columbus.

A "practical" seminary requiring less academic study was begun as a department of the Theological Seminary in 1881. It moved in 1884 to a separate campus in Afton, Minnesota, and named Luther Seminary. In 1892, it moved again to the Phalen Park area of Saint Paul, Minnesota, and became part of the St. Paul Luther College, Seminary, and Academy. That seminary merged into the Iowa Synod's Wartburg Theological Seminary in Dubuque, Iowa, in 1932, shortly after the merger of the two German-based synods into the first American Lutheran Church two years earlier.

The college division of St. Paul Luther College, Seminary, and Academy continued operating in Afton, Minnesota, from 1884 to 1893, and in Saint Paul from 1893 to 1935, at which time it merged into Wartburg College in Waverly, Iowa. The Ohio Synod also operated several educational institutions that were relatively short-lived: Hebron Academy opened in Hebron, Nebraska, in 1911, added a junior college in 1924 as Hebron College and Academy, and closed in 1942. Similarly, St. John's Academy opened in Petersburg, West Virginia, in 1921, added a junior college in 1931 to become St. John's Academy and College, and closed in 1933 in the deepening Great Depression. Other schools included Woodville Normal School in Woodville, Ohio, from 1882 to 1923; a second practical seminary in Hickory, North Carolina, from 1887 to 1912; and Pacific Seminary in Olympia, Washington, from 1907 until 1911, when the theological department was discontinued, and 1917, when the remaining college department was discontinued.

== Notable people ==
- Carl Christian Hein, last president of the Ohio Synod, 1924–1930
- Paul Henkel, one of the founders of the Ohio Synod
- Richard C. H. Lenski seminary professor and author
- Matthias Loy, president of the Ohio Synod, 1860–1878 and 1880–1894
- Blanche Margaret Milligan, author
- Wilhelm Sihler, Lutheran pastor
- Frederick William Stellhorn, professor
