= Trinity Lutheran Seminary =

Lutheran seminary in Columbus, Ohio, US

Trinity Lutheran Seminary at Capital University
- Type: Seminary
- Established: 1830 (ELTS); 1845 (Hamma); 1978 (Trinity)
- Religious affiliation: Evangelical Lutheran Church in America
- Dean: Rachel Wrenn
- Faculty: 5
- Postgraduates: 46
- Location: Columbus, Ohio, United States; 39.9569°N 82.9405°W
- Website: www.capital.edu/trinity/

Trinity Lutheran Seminary at Capital University (formerly the German Theological Seminary of the Ohio Synod; the Evangelical Lutheran Theological Seminary, ELTS; and Trinity Lutheran Seminary) is a seminary of the Evangelical Lutheran Church in America at Capital University in Columbus, Ohio, United States.

== History ==
In 1830, the German Theological Seminary of the Ohio Synod, later known as the Evangelical Lutheran Theological Seminary (ELTS), was founded to meet the need for educating pastors in the Ohio region. It generally used the German language in its education and materials for its first few decades. It began in Canton, Ohio, but soon moved to Columbus, the state capital, and located in the suburban neighborhood of Bexley. It was operated by the Evangelical Lutheran Joint Synod of Ohio and Other States (known in short as the Joint Synod of Ohio), which also used the German language. The Joint Synod existed from 1818 until its merger in 1930 with two smaller German-language regional synods (the Iowa Synod and the Buffalo Synod) into the first denomination known as the American Lutheran Church. During these decades, the seminary was run as the theological department of the nearby Capital University, which had been chartered by the Joint Synod in 1850. The seminary was, as a result, known as "Capital Seminary". In 1960, the American Lutheran Church merged with other Lutheran churches to form The American Lutheran Church (ALC), the second denomination with that name.

With the growing closeness and theological friendships during the mid-20th century between major American Lutheran traditions, the decision was made in 1974 to consolidate ELTS and nearby Hamma Divinity School. Hamma was founded in 1845 as the Theological Department of Wittenberg College, in Springfield, Ohio, and was associated with the regional Ohio Synod jurisdiction of the General Synod. The General Synod merged into the United Lutheran Church in America (ULCA) in 1917–1918, and the ULCA in turn merged in 1962 with several other Lutheran denominations into the Lutheran Church in America (LCA).

The merged institution, renamed Trinity Lutheran Seminary, opened its doors on September 1, 1978. For the decade from 1978 until the merger creating the Evangelical Lutheran Church in America in 1988, Trinity was owned and operated jointly by the ALC and the LCA. At the time they were two of the three largest Lutheran bodies in the United States.

On January 1, 2018, Trinity rejoined the university that it founded in 1850, Capital University, to become Trinity Lutheran Seminary at Capital University.

== Academics ==
Trinity Lutheran Seminary is accredited and its degree programs are approved by the Association of Theological Schools in the United States and Canada and by the Commission on Institutions of Higher Education of the North Central Association of Colleges and Schools.

Trinity offers First Professional degrees of Master of Divinity (M.Div.) and Master of Theological Studies (MTS).

== See also ==
- Nelson Wesley Trout
- List of ELCA seminaries
- Bexley Hall
