= Buffalo Synod =

Former Lutheran denomination in the united States

Lutheran Synod of Buffalo
- Abbreviation: Buffalo Synod
- Classification: Protestant
- Orientation: Lutheran
- Theology: Confessional Lutheran
- Structure: National synod and local congregations
- Region: Primarily in the U.S. states of New York and Wisconsin
- Headquarters: Buffalo, New York
- Founder: J. A. A. Grabau
- Origin: 1845; Milwaukee, Wisconsin
- Separated from: Prussian Union
- Merged into: American Lutheran Church (1930)
- Congregations: 54 (1929)
- Members: 7,891 (1929)
- Ministers: 45 (1929)

The Lutheran Synod of Buffalo, organized on June 25, 1845, in Milwaukee, Wisconsin, by four pastors and 18 lay delegates as the Synod of Lutheran Emigrants from Prussia (German: Synode der aus Preussen ausgewanderten lutherischen Kirche), was commonly known from early in its history as the Buffalo Synod. The synod resulted from the efforts of pastor J. A. A. Grabau and members of his congregation in Erfurt, along with other congregations, to escape the forced union of Lutheran and Reformed churches in Prussia by immigrating to New York City, Albany, and Buffalo, New York, and to Milwaukee, Wisconsin, in 1839. Grabau and the largest group settled in Buffalo.

Grabau and the Buffalo Synod were committed to the Lutheran Confessions and initially sought to work with the Missouri Synod and with the pastors sent to America by Johann Konrad Wilhelm Löhe. However, Grabau's belief that ordination of pastors must be performed by other pastors to be valid and that pastors must be obeyed by the congregation even on matters not required by the Bible clashed with those of the Missouri Synod, leading to years of strife. This was exacerbated by the Missouri Synod's practice of providing spiritual care to individuals and groups that disagreed with him. Finally, in 1859, the Buffalo Synod excommunicated the Missouri Synod.

Within the Buffalo Synod, a number of pastors and congregations disagreed with Grabau, and in 1866, he was found guilty of heresy by the synod and ordered to recant his views. Upon his refusal, a schism occurred. Twelve pastors joined the Missouri Synod and six formed an independent synod that was disbanded in 1877 with most of those pastors and congregations joining the Wisconsin Synod. Only three pastors remained loyal to Grabau, but the synod gradually overturned Grabau's distinctive doctrines, especially after his death in 1879.

In 1930, the synod merged with the Ohio Synod and the Iowa Synod to form the first instance of the American Lutheran Church (ALC). The latter body, after further mergers, became part of the Evangelical Lutheran Church in America in 1988.

In 1850, the synod established Martin Luther College and Seminary in Buffalo, which continued in operation until the formation of the ALC.

In 1929, just before its merger into the ALC, the Buffalo Synod had 45 pastors, 54 congregations, and 7,981 members.
