= Capital University =

Private university in Bexley, Ohio, US

Coordinates: 39.954828°N 82.938141°W

- Former name: Theological Seminary of the Evangelical Lutheran Synod of Ohio (1830–1850)
- Type: Private
- Established: June 3, 1830; 196 years ago
- Religious affiliation: Evangelical Lutheran Church in America
- Endowment: $155.2 million (2025)
- President: Jared R. Tice
- Faculty: 159 full-time, 245 part-time
- Students: 3,367 (fall 2018)
- Undergraduates: 2,718 (fall 2018)
- Postgraduates: 649 (fall 2018)
- Location: 1 College and Main, Columbus, Ohio, 43209, United States
- Campus: Suburban 53 acres
- Colors: Purple, gray, white
- Nickname: Comets
- Sporting affiliations: NCAA Division III – OAC
- Website: capital.edu
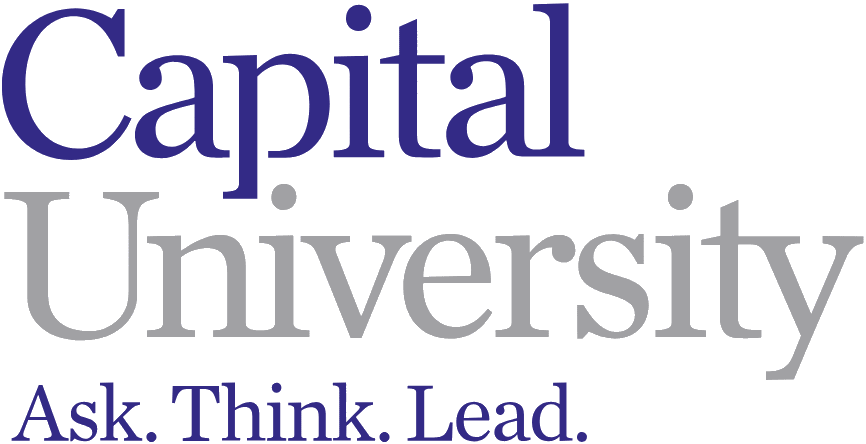

U.S. National Register of Historic Places
- Official name: Capital University Historic District
- Designated: December 17, 1982
- Reference no.: 82001457

Capital University (Capital, Cap, or CU) is a private university in Bexley, Ohio, United States. Capital was founded as the Theological Seminary of the Evangelical Lutheran Synod of Ohio in 1830 and later was associated with that synod's successor, the American Lutheran Church. The university has undergraduate and graduate programs, as well as a law school and seminary. Capital University is the oldest university in central Ohio and is one of the oldest and largest Lutheran-affiliated universities in North America.

== History ==
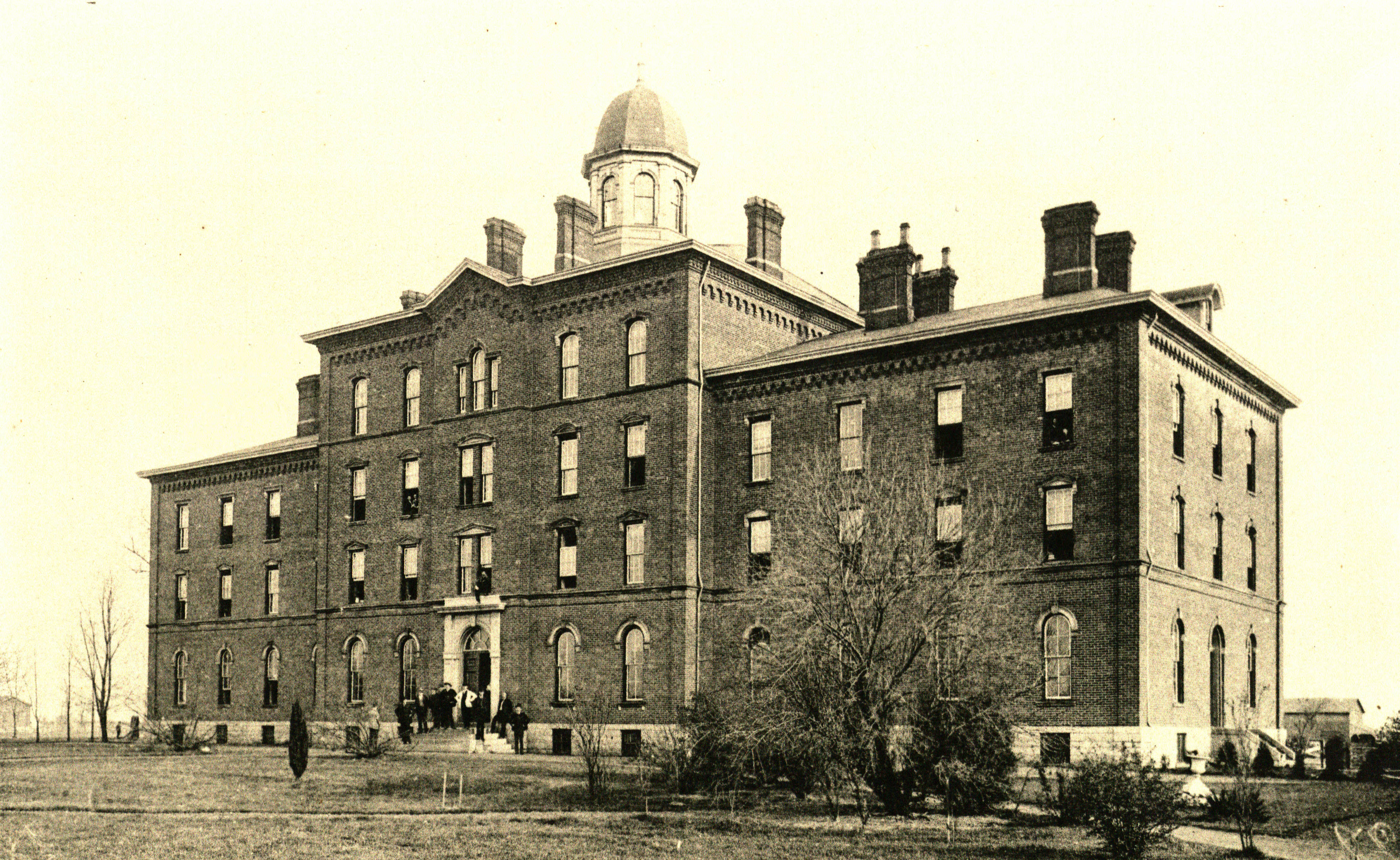
Lehmann Hall at Capitol University, 1889

Capital University was founded on June 3, 1830, as the German Theological Seminary of the Evangelical Lutheran Synod of Ohio in Canton, Ohio, 40 years before the founding of Ohio State University, making it the oldest university in Central Ohio. It moved to downtown Columbus in 1832. On March 2, 1850, Capital University was chartered. At that time, the denomination was renamed to the Evangelical Lutheran Joint Synod of Ohio and Other States and grew into a nationwide church body. The first president of the university was William Morton Reynolds.

In 1930, the Joint Synod was merged with two other smaller German language groups, the Iowa Synod (formed 1854) and the Buffalo Synod (founded 1845) to create the American Lutheran Church (ALC), headquartered in Columbus. The ALC existed for only three decades, until 1960, when it, in turn, participated in a more extensive merger with the Evangelical Lutheran Church and the United Evangelical Lutheran Church Danish to form The American Lutheran Church. The second ALC lasted until the formation of the current Evangelical Lutheran Church in America (ELCA) in 1988, with offices in Chicago, Illinois.

The university moved its main campus to the rural periphery of the state capital in the community of Bexley in 1876. This rural area has since developed into an upscale suburb. Capital University's educational mission is based on Lutheran values of free inquiry, critical thinking, and leadership. A current motto used at the school is "Ask. Think. Lead", a continuing reminder of its educational mission.

In recognition of several buildings' historic architectural merit, a portion of the campus was entered on the National Register of Historic Places as the "Capital University Historic District" in 1982. The district comprises Mees Hall, Bexley Hall, the Kerns Religious Life Center (formerly Rudolph Hall), and Leonard Hall. The district initially included Lehmann Hall and Loy Hall, but those two buildings have since been demolished.

In May 2004, the university received approval to close Mound Street between College Avenue and Pleasant Ridge Avenue from the city of Bexley. In 2006, the university constructed a pedestrian mall on the closed portion of Mound Street, including parking, improved lighting, benches, and landscaping. The $2.5 million project unified the northern and southern parts of campus.

Denvy A. Bowman, the university's 15th president retired on July 1, 2016, ending his ten-year tenure as president. On February 9, 2016, Elizabeth L. Paul was named as the 16th president of Capital and was the first woman to hold the position at the university; she resigned in 2020 after a no-confidence vote was held amongst faculty and staff. David Kaufman became interim president in June 2020 and was named the 17th president on July 25, 2021. Jared R. Tice was named the 18th president of Capital University in June 2025.

The seminary, which had been renamed to the Evangelical Lutheran Theological Seminary, became independent of the university in 1959. It merged with Hamma Divinity School, the theological department of nearby Wittenberg University in Springfield, Ohio, in 1978 and reopened on the Bexley campus as Trinity Lutheran Seminary, where it continues today as a theological seminary of the ELCA. In the fall of 2016, Capital University and Trinity Lutheran Seminary announced that the two would reunite after 58 years of operating separately. The goal was to complete the reunion plan by the summer of 2017, with implementation to follow over the next two years. The merger was actually completed January 1, 2018.

On July 13, 2020, the university Board of Trustees announced plans to retire the Crusader nickname and the "Cappy" mascot following a 15-month-long study. The university formally adopted "Capital Comets" as the new mascot name on September 30, 2021.

== Campus ==
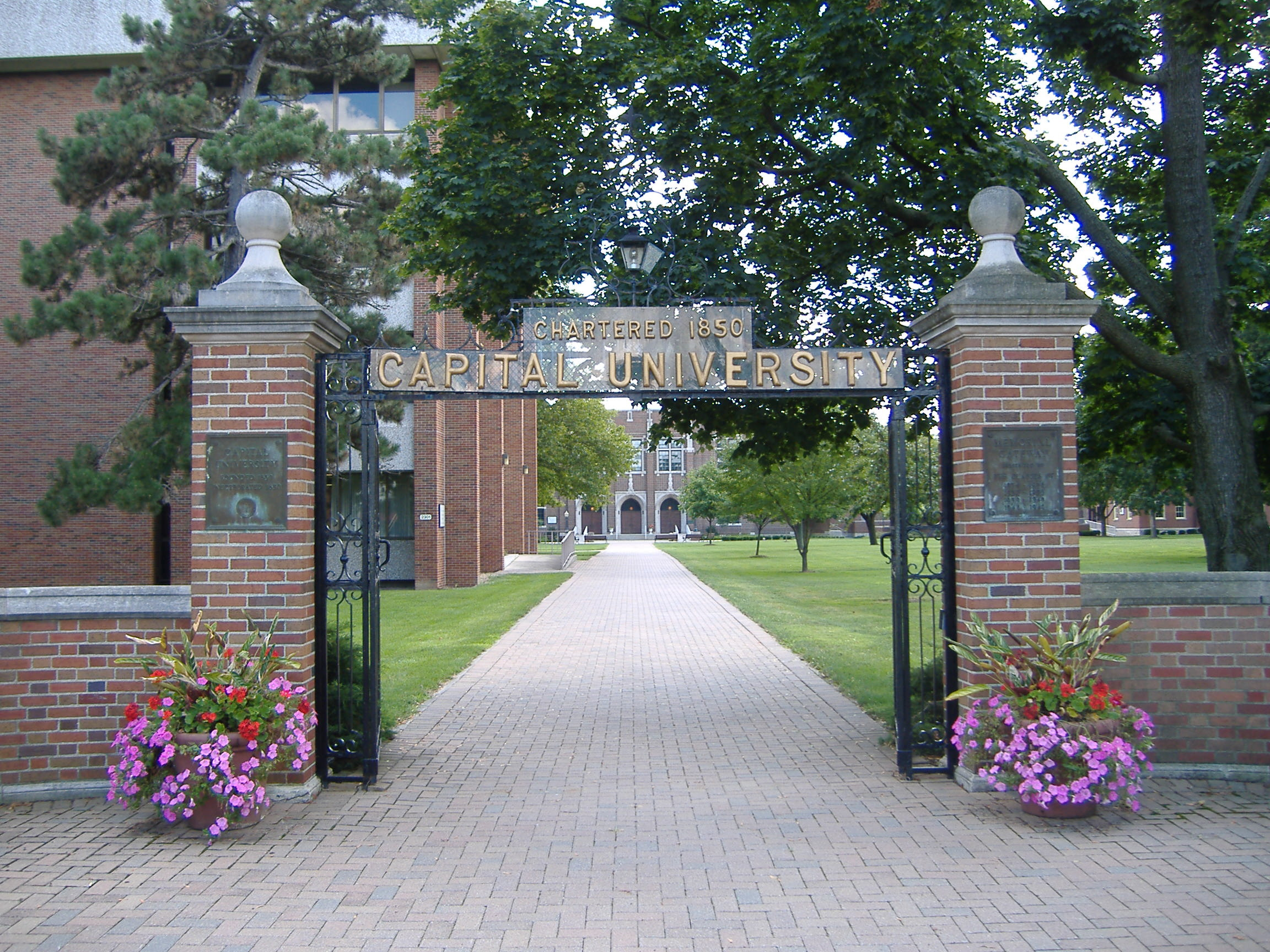
Campus entrance gate from Main Street

The academic buildings on campus include Battelle Hall, Ruff Learning Center, Troutman Hall, Huber-Spielman Hall, and the Conservatory of Music, as well as the Trinity Lutheran Seminary Complex.

The Harry C. Moores Student Union was renovated and rededicated in 2013. The Student Union is also home to the campus mail room and the main dining facilities for Capital University. The Mezz Fitness Center within the building opened in 2017.

Blackmore Library is a four-floor structure. Constructed in 1969 and dedicated in March 1971, the library now contains more than 300,000 media articles. The library was named in 1998 for Josiah Blackmore, a well-known legal scholar, and former university president. Computers and study rooms are located on the first three floors for use. The second floor features offices for career services and academic tutoring along with an extensive music collection, including a significant vinyl collection. The third floor contains many articles and much of the university's historical data. The fourth floor is the home to the Schumacher Gallery, which houses a large art collection on campus.

Schumacher Gallery was founded in 1964 and features permanent collections which consist of a diverse selection of more than 2,500 works of art for education and enjoyment. The Gallery's collection has been supplemented by hundreds of donors of art, funds, and service, including 502-piece Schreiber-Fox Collection of African Art. Schumacher Gallery also features several exhibitions throughout the year, including major works and student showcases.

A piece of the Berlin Wall is a popular attraction for visitors and incoming students. Obtained in 1992, the wall was given on a long-term loan from Hansa Consulting, a German-based corporation. On one side is colorful graffiti written during the separation of East and West Berlin, while on the other is blank concrete revealing a few bullet holes, evidence of the confinement of East Berliners. Once housed in Blackmore Library and later in the Huber-Spielman Hall Courtyard, the wall now sits outside the main doors of Blackmore Library. The concrete wall weighs 2.8 tons.

== Academics ==
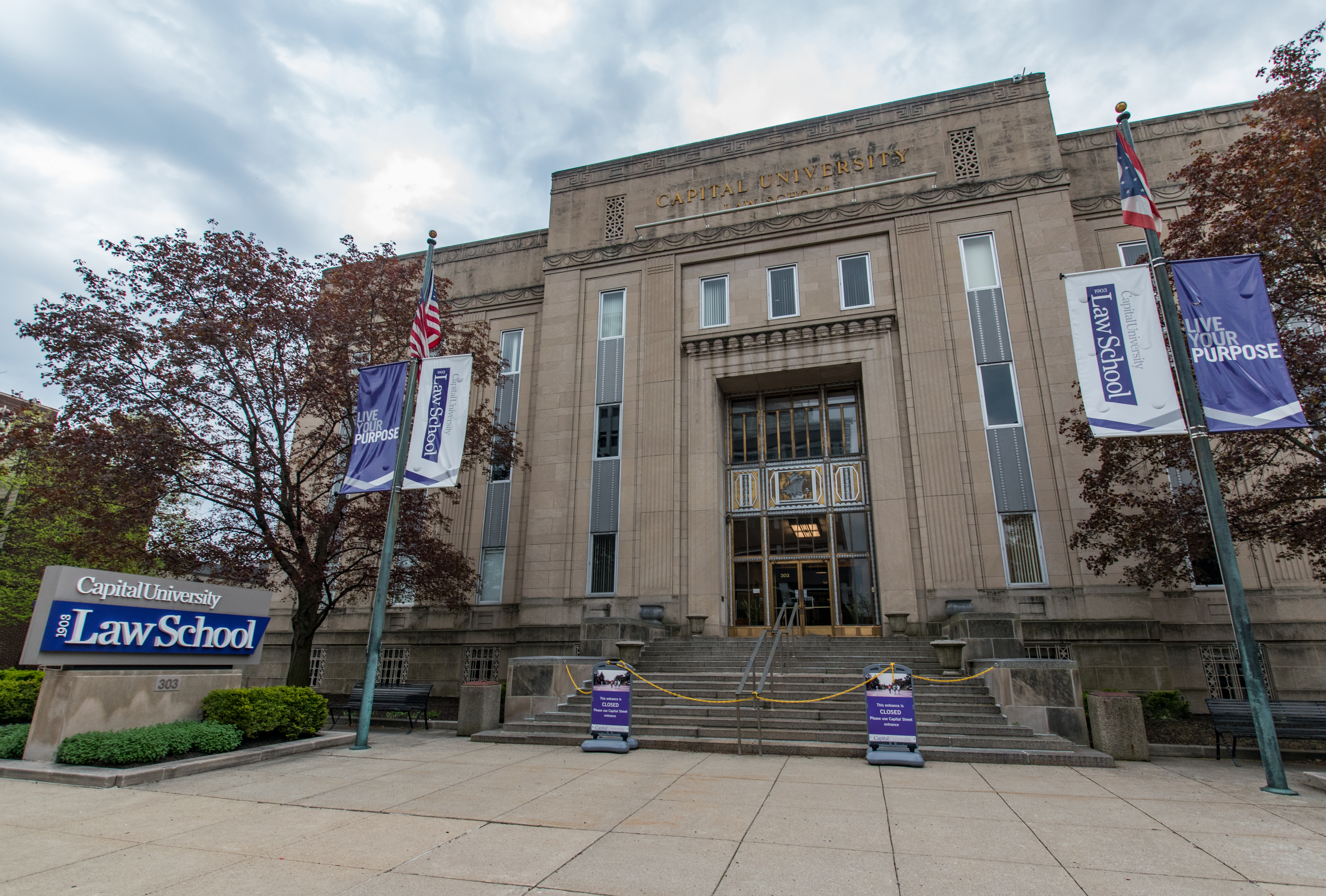
Capital University Law School in downtown Columbus

Capital is accredited by the Higher Learning Commission. It has more than 60 majors and 51 minors to choose from. Capital University's ranking in the 2026 U.S. News & World Report edition of Best Colleges for Regional Universities Midwest was tied at #42.

Capital University Law School is an ABA-accredited private law school located in downtown Columbus. It was founded in 1903 and became affiliated with Capital University in 1966. It was ranked #174 out of 194 law schools in 2025.

Trinity Lutheran Seminary at Capital University is accredited and its degree programs are approved by the Association of Theological Schools in the United States and Canada and by the Commission on Institutions of Higher Education of the North Central Association of Colleges and Schools.

== Student life ==
Capital University features more than 100 student organizations. This includes 13 fraternities and sororities, arts and media organizations, cultural organizations, honors societies, campus programming, religious organizations, service organizations, and government and social organizations. Some examples include Pride, PRSSA, Circle K, Jewish Student Association, ReCap Literary Magazine, the Chimes (student news), intramural sports, student government, and numerous music organizations in which both non-music and music majors can perform.

Capital is a residential campus that operates on semester schedules. Most students live on campus in one of seven residence halls or apartments. Traditional Halls include Saylor-Ackermann Hall, Cotterman Hall, the Lohman Complex, and Schaaf Hall. Suite-style living includes Trinity and College Avenue Hall. Apartments include Capital Commons and the Capital University Apartments. There are also a select number of houses on Sheridan avenue through campus housing.

=== Music ===
Capital University's music program is well-respected in the music community. Consisting of traditional and contemporary tracks, legendary faculty member Ray Eubanks started the jazz and music industry programs, some of the first in the nation. The largest degree concentration within the Conservatory is the Music Technology program, consisting of two tracks authored by Dr. Rocky J. Reuter, who also created the composition degree, the MIDI Band (an all-electronic live ensemble that has toured throughout the mid-west and eastern US), Ensemble Now (an improvisational-based contemporary music ensemble) and NOW MUSIC Festival, an annual celebration of contemporary music. The Chapel Choir has performed around Ohio and the world, including Carnegie Hall. The annual Christmas Festival at Capital is a popular local event and community institution led by all the choral ensembles (the Capital Consort, Cantabile, Choral Union, Philomel and Chapel Choir). The dean of the Conservatory of Music is Dr. Tom Zugger.

There are large ensembles that are selected by auditions: members do not need to be music majors to audition. Instruments like choirs are available to all majors as well, and membership doesn't require audition. Chamber groups such as quartets and quintets consist of music majors and music minors.

=== Student media ===
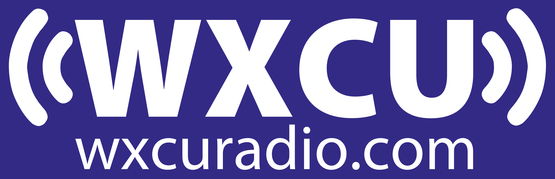
Logo for WXCU Radio 2014-Present

The campus radio station, WXCU Radio, is entirely student-run and managed. In 2007, the radio station began streaming online only with an alternative and indie rock format. Students can host their radio show and interview nationally touring acts. Additionally, the station hosts several concerts and also supports the efforts of other groups campus-wide. Participation can be either extra-curricular or for credits. The station takes music submissions and frequently features music produced by students.

The three-story Convergent Media Center is designed to facilitate interdisciplinary work. The lower level contains a professional recording studio and digital art and design laboratories. A television and radio studio on the first floor allows video production and radio, television, film, visual, technical, and performing arts training. The first floor also houses the student radio station, WXCU, studios, and the control room for CapTV, along with event space for student publications. The second-level houses faculty offices, small conference rooms, and seminar classrooms.

== Athletics ==
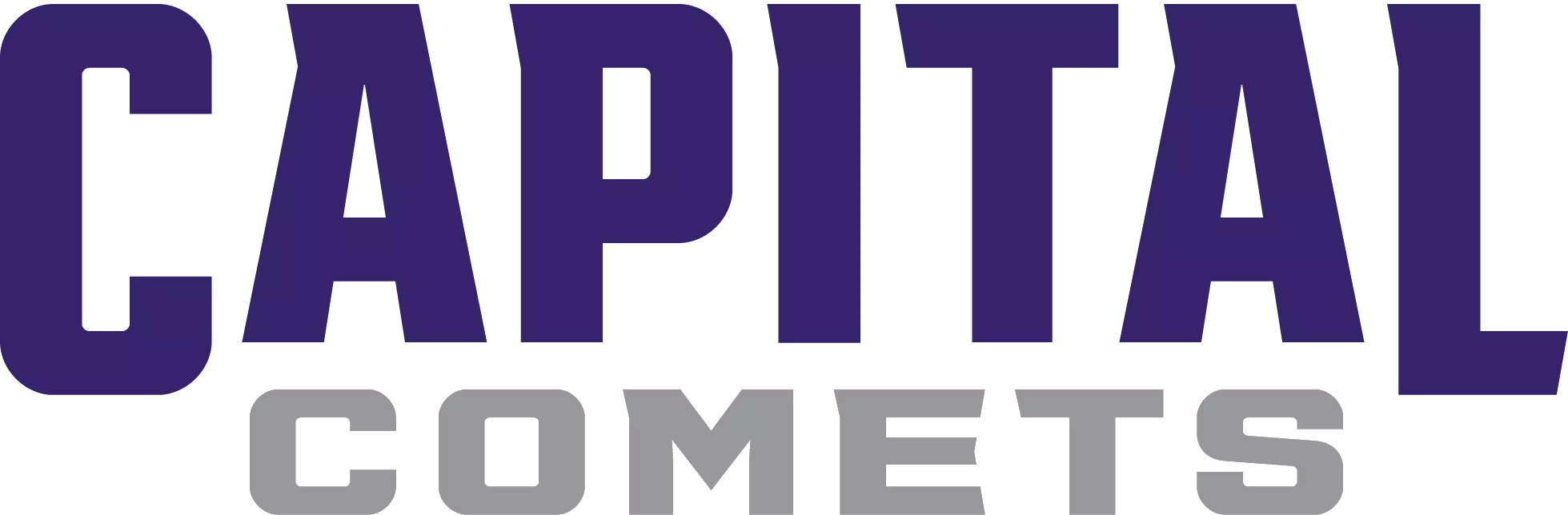
Capital Comets wordmark

Capital University participates in numerous intercollegiate sports as a member Ohio Athletic Conference (OAC) at the NCAA Division III level. The school's primary athletic rival is the Otterbein Cardinals of Westerville, Ohio. Capital's teams have been known as the Comets since September 2021, when the name was changed from the Crusaders. In the 1930s, the school's teams were called the Fighting Lutherans. The following teams and clubs compete on the varsity level:

Men's sports	Women's sports
Baseball	Basketball
Basketball	Bowling
Bowling	Cross Country
Cross Country	Golf
Football	Lacrosse
Golf	Soccer
Lacrosse	Softball
Soccer	Tennis
Tennis	Track and field
Track and field	Volleyball
Coed sports
Esports

Capital University became the first school to win back-to-back NCAA Division III Women's Basketball National Championships in 1994 and 1995. The two championships highlight a five-year run that featured four trips to the national semifinals and finals. The Crusaders finished second in the nation in 1993 and third in 1997.

Capital University currently offers several intramural sports including Sand Volleyball, Cornhole, Flag Football, and Basketball.

=== Facilities ===
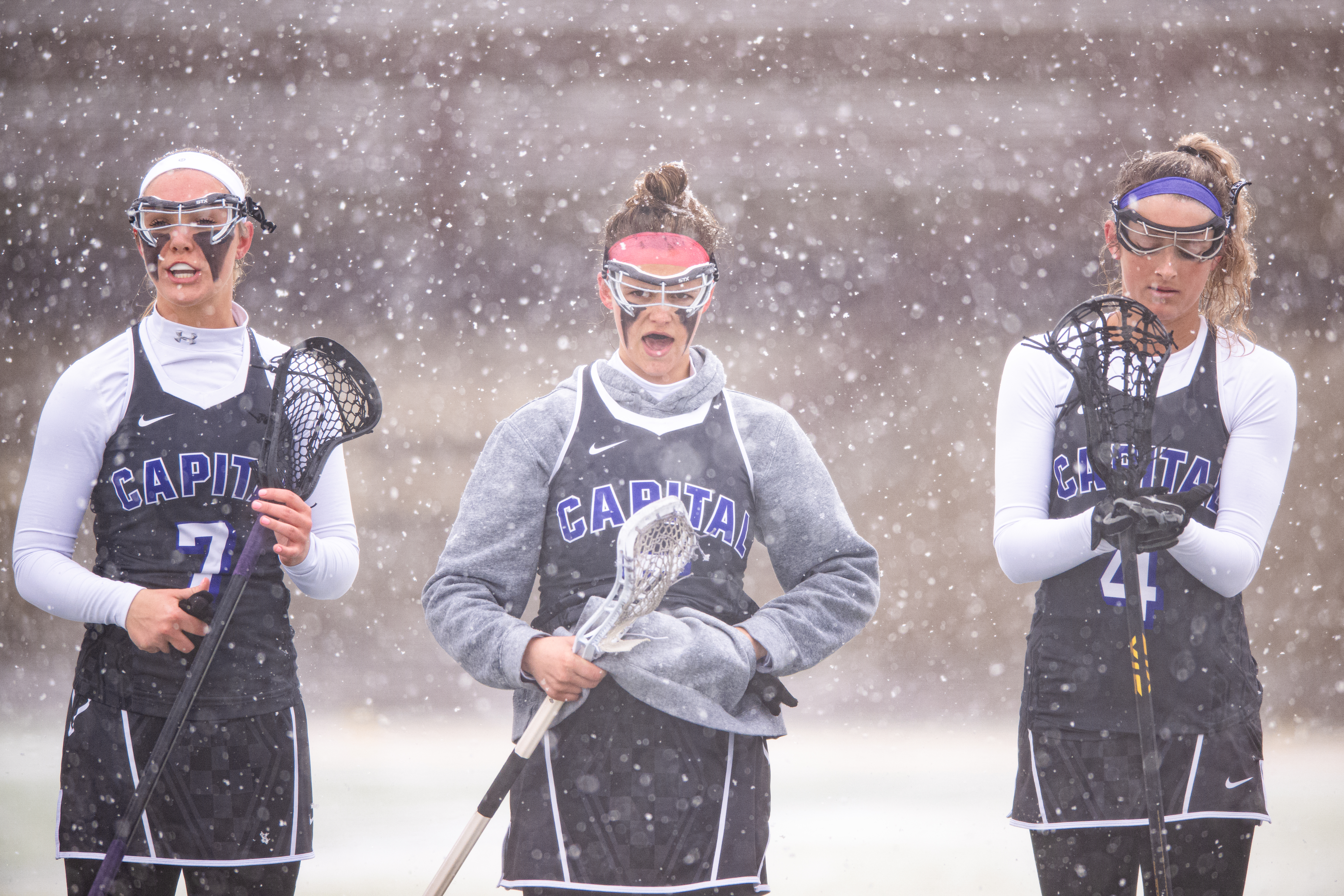
Members of the Capital University women's lacrosse team during a game in 2022

The Capital Center is a 126,000-square-foot recreational and athletic complex that opened in 2001. The facility has an indoor track and field facility, which is scheduled to receive major enhancements in Summer 2026. Also located inside is a weight room and cardio workout area open to students. The facility has an indoor track as well. The basketball and volleyball teams use the main gym inside the complex for their home games. Some classes are also held inside the Capital Center. The Capital Center is connected to Bernlor Stadium.

Bernlohr Stadium is home to the football, men's and women's soccer, track, and men's and women's lacrosse teams. In 2011, Field turf was reinstalled on the field. The stadium does have a three-lane track. The capacity is around 3,000, with seating and standing room. In the fall of 2012, a new HD LCD scoreboard was revealed. In October 2014, Capital was granted permission to install stadium lights and a new sound system at the stadium by the Bexley Planning Commission. This decision was upheld in January 2015 by the Bexley City Council after residents living near the stadium appealed the planning commission's decision.

In the fall of 2016, alumnus Wells Purmort (class of 1958) donated to the university's athletic department. Purmort gave a gift of $1 million, which will be used to maintain the turf at the stadium and be used for the eventual replacement of the field. To show its appreciation, the university named the playing surface after him. The stadium is now known as Purmort Field at Bernlohr Stadium.

Clowson Field is home to the baseball and softball teams. The field is located just a short drive from campus off of South Nelson Road.

== See also ==
- Capital University Law School
