= Johann Friedrich Wucherer =

German Lutheran pastor, theologian and author (1803–1881)

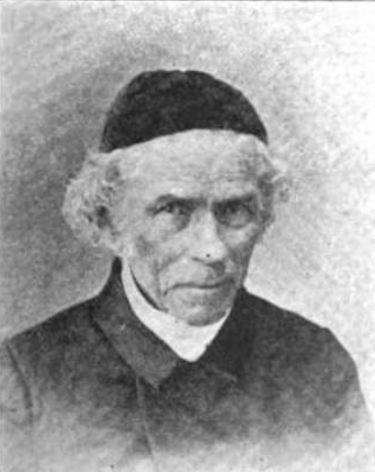
- Born: 8 March 1803; Nördlingen, Bavaria
- Died: 26 December 1881 (aged 78); Aha (Gunzenhausen)
- Education: University of Erlangen
- Religion: Lutheran
- Congregations served: Baldingen (1832 - 1855) and Aha (1855 - 1866)

Johann Friedrich Wucherer (8 March 1803 – 26 December 1881) was a German Lutheran pastor, theologian, author, and co-founder of the Society of Inner (and Outer) Missions (der Gesellschaft für innere Mission) with Wilhelm Löhe, based in Neuendettelsau.

== Early life and education ==
Wucherer was born in Nördlingen and went on to study at the University of Erlangen. After completing his studies he worked for some time as an assistant minister in Nördlingen before he was appointed as the hospital-preacher (German: Hospitalprediger) in Nördlingen in 1832.

== Career ==
Besides becoming the hospital preacher in Nördlingen in 1832, Wucherer also became pastor at Baldingen that same year. He served as the pastor at Baldingen until 1855. During his years at Nördlingen and Baldingen, he began working with his friend Wilhelm Löhe to recruit aid to German Lutheran immigrants. He used his pen to raise the support needed and oversaw the publications of several newsletters. This work was instrumental in helping to establish the Missouri and Iowa synods in North America as well as Concordia Theological Seminary and Wartburg College.

In 1855, he was called to become the pastor at Aha (Gunzenhausen). Wucherer died in Aha in 1881.

== Publications ==
=== Editor ===
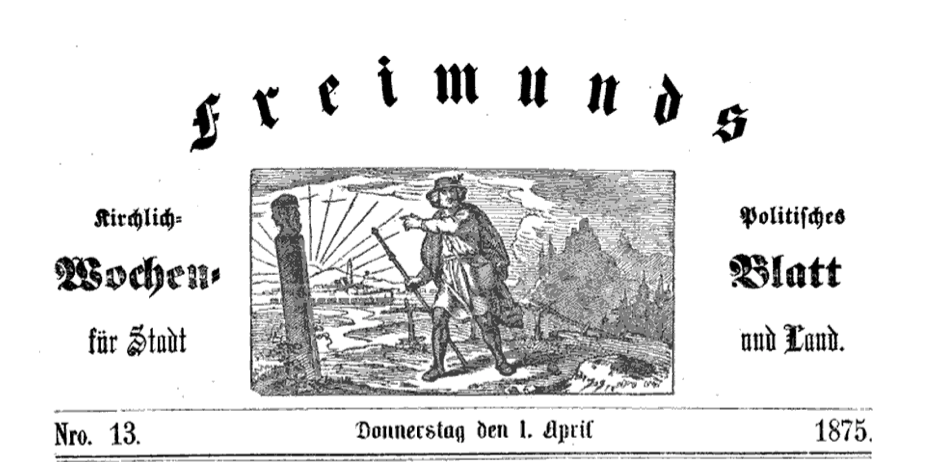
Freimunds Kirchlich-Politisches Wochenblatt

In 1843, responding to F.C.D. Wyneken's Die Noth der deutschen Lutheraner in Nordamerika (English: The Distress of the German Lutherans in North America), Wucherer and Löhe established the Kirchliche Mittheilungen aus und über Nord-Amerika (English: Church News about and from North America) in order to raise support on behalf of the needs of German Lutheran immigrants in America.

In 1855 he also established the Freimunds kirchlich- politisches Wochenblatt für Stadt und Land (English: Free Mouth's Church and Politics Weekly Newsletter for City and Village). It continued to be published after his death until 1941.

=== Author ===
Wucherer was the author of numerous books, most of which were theological in nature.

Books:

- Löhe, Wilhelm and Eduard Stirner, Johann Friedrich Wucherer, Eduard Bachmann, Friedrich Bauer, ed., Fünf Festreden, nebst Gesängen und Gebeten, gehalten bei der ersten Jahresfeier der Gesellschaft für innere Mission im Sinne der lutherischen Kirche den 19. Juni 1850 in der Kirche zu St Aegydien in Nürnberg. Joh. Phil. Raw, Nürnberg: 1850.
- Aus führlicher Nachweis aus Schrift und Symbolen, daß das evangelisch-lutherische Pfarramt das apostolische Hirten- und Lehramt, und darum göttliche Stiftung sei, Nördlingen: C. H. Beck 1853.
- Das Wort der Wahrheit, oder populäre Einleitung in die Schriften des Neuen Testaments: ein Buch für alles Volk.
  - Band 1, Nördlingen: C. H. Beck 1848.
  - Band 2, Nördlingen: C. H. Beck 1850.
- Handleiter durch Katechismus und Spruchbuch der evangelisch-lutherischen Kirche in Bayern, Nördlingen: C. H. Beck 1844.
  - 3. Auflage 1860.
- Kleeblätter. Biblisches, Christliches, Kirchliches in mancherlei Form. Nördlingen: C. H. Beck 1869.
- Vom evangelisch-lutherischen Hauptgottesdienste, Nördlingen: C. H. Beck 1846.
- Zu einem Zeugnis : fünf Predigten, Nördlingen: C. H. Beck 1846.
- Zu einem Zeugnis. Predigten über die sonn- und festtäglichen Evangelien des ganzen Kirchenjahres. Nürnberg: Gottfried Löhe 1867
