= Andrew Schulze =

American Lutheran pastor and Civil Rights advocate

Andrew Schulz
- Born: March 8, 1896; Cincinnati, Ohio, U.S.
- Died: March 30, 1982 (aged 86); Berkeley, California, U.S.
- Education: Concordia Theological Seminary
- Occupation: Pastor
- Years active: 1924–1968
- Known for: Civil rights advocacy
- Religion: Lutheran
- Church: Lutheran Church – Missouri Synod
- Ordained: 1924
- Congregations served: Springfield, Illinois (1924–1928); St. Louis, Missouri (1928–1947); Chicago, Illinois (1947–1954)
- Offices held: Executive Secretary of Lutheran Human Relations Association of America (1953–1968)

Andrew Schulze (March 8, 1896 – March 30, 1982) was a Lutheran Church – Missouri Synod (LCMS) clergyman who worked on race relations from 1924 until 1968 actively. After retirement, he continued to work on race relations. His work included partaking in the creation and founding of the Lutheran Human Relations Association of America (LHRAA), and he was its first executive secretary, whose duties including editing The Vanguard, the publication of the LHRAA.

== Early life and education ==
Schulze was born on March 8, 1896, in Cincinnati, Ohio. He attended Concordia Theological Seminary in Springfield, Illinois. Upon graduation from the seminary in 1924, he served African-American Lutheran congregations in Springfield (1924–1928), St. Philip's Evangelical Lutheran Church in St. Louis, Missouri (1928–1947, and Christ the King Lutheran Church in Chicago, Illinois (1947–1954).

== Role in Civil Rights Movement ==
Andrew Schulze's final full-time job was as the Executive Secretary of the LHRAA after a long career of working in Negro Missions for the LCMS. With the creation of the LHRAA in 1954 at Valparaiso University, he promptly began working as the organization' Executive Secretary. His work involved putting together Summer Institutes, promoting integration in the LCMS and in other Lutheran bodies, and editing the LHRAA's publication, The Vanguard.

Part of his work on integrating the LCMS involved lobbying for the LCMS's Pronouncement on Race Relations in 1956. Other work involved bringing speakers to the LHRAA's Summer Institute. In 1956, the speaker was Pastor Robert S. Graetz, who spoke about his participation in the Montgomery bus boycott. The purpose of these speakers was to actively work for integration.

Also in 1962, Schulze participated in the "Albany Movement" in Georgia. The main purpose of the movement was to increase black voter registration. Unfortunately this movement was not as successful as other voter movements. Therefore, Martin Luther King Jr. was calling for help from religious leaders. Concerning this event, Schulze stated, "I have been writing about this all the time, and if I can only write and I can't put my body where my words are then I am not much of a writer."

On August 26, 1962, Schulze was part of a group peacefully protesting civil rights at the Albany City Hall. They offered some prayer during their protest and had national media attention. Police Chief Pritchett arrested the religious leaders and quietly placed them in jail. In total, Andrew Schulze spent six days in jail. This addition of white clergy from the North protesting was a first for the Civil Rights Movement and led to further publication and addressing of civil rights.

== Death ==
Schulze died on March 30, 1982, in Berkeley, California.
