= Trinity Lutheran Church (St. Louis, Missouri) =

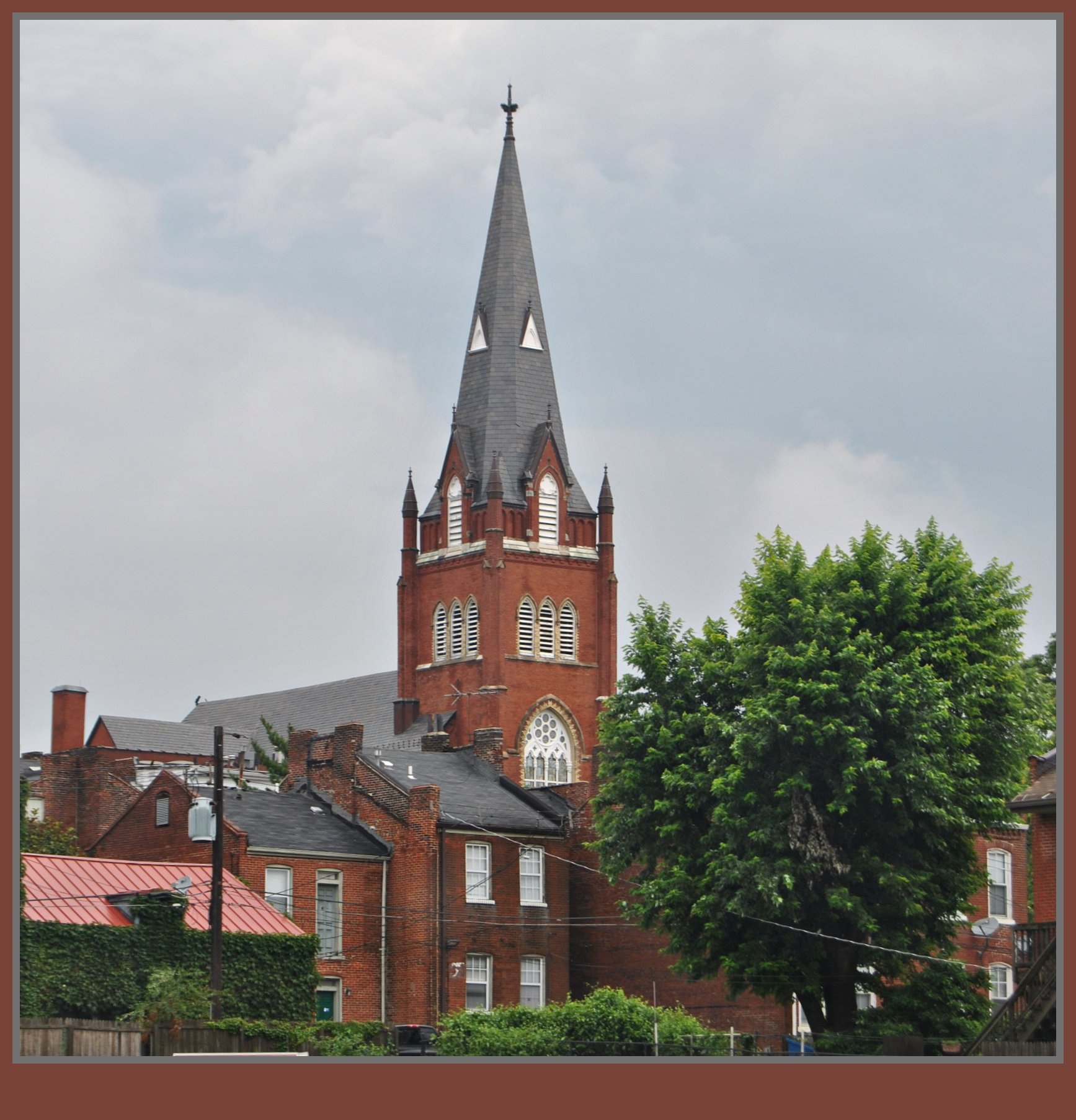
- View of Trinity Lutheran Church in 2011
- Trinity Lutheran Church
- 38°36′33″N 90°12′10″W
- Location: 812 Soulard St. St. Louis, Missouri, U.S.
- Denomination: Lutheran Church–Missouri Synod
- Website: trinitystlouis.com

History
- Founded: 1839

Architecture
- Architectural type: Gothic Revival

Administration
- District: Missouri

Trinity Lutheran Church is a Lutheran Church – Missouri Synod (LCMS) congregation in St. Louis, Missouri, U.S. It is considered the "mother church" of the LCMS. It is also often referred to as "Historic Trinity", "Trinity Soulard", "Trinity + Soulard", or "Historic Trinity Soulard".

== History ==
Located at 812 Soulard Street in the Soulard neighborhood, it is the oldest Lutheran church of the contiguous United States west of the Mississippi River. Its architectural style is Gothic revival.

The church was founded in 1839 by German Lutheran immigrants from Saxony who had arrived in the United States in 1838. They traveled by boat from New Orleans to St. Louis. Much of their party soon traveled south to Perry County, Missouri; those who remained in St. Louis started a church that went for three years with neither name nor dedicated worship facility. The congregation first met at an Episcopal church at Broadway and Walnut Streets.

The Saxon Lutherans brought with them a library, church organ, and church bells. The congregation's school had roots dating to the 1830s when the Saxon children studied on their journey to the United States.

Otto Hermann Walther was inducted as the first pastor on June 9, 1839. When he died in 1841, his brother Carl Ferdinand Wilhelm Walther accepted the call to lead Trinity Lutheran. C. F. W. Walther's tenure at Trinity lasted from May 1841 until his death in 1887, during which time he also served as president of the LCMS and president of Concordia Seminary.

The first building, on Lombard Street, was dedicated in 1842.

With Rev CFW Walther, Trinity began a “publishing house”, wrote the first LCMS hymnal Kirchengesangbuch, and Der Lutheraner newspaper which brought Lutheran congregations around the mid-west together to form the “Joint Synod of Missouri, Ohio and Other States,” with Rev CFW Walther as Synod President in 1848.

A new church at Eighth and Soulard streets was built in 1865. That building was destroyed by the 1896 St. Louis tornado. The congregation rebuilt the sanctuary on the same property and was able to incorporate the pulpit and baptismal font that had survived the tornado.

Trinity was known as the "mother church" to three other early Lutheran congregations in St. Louis; this group was called the Gesammtgemeinde, or "general congregation". The others were Immanuel (1848 – 2012) in the Greater Ville neighborhood, Holy Cross Lutheran (1858) in the Gravois Park neighborhood, and Zion Lutheran (1860 - 2022) in the St. Louis Place neighborhood.

The 150th anniversary of the LCMS was celebrated at Trinity in 1997. Restoration work on one of its mahogany window frames was completed in 2008.
