= Wilhelm Sihler =

German missionary

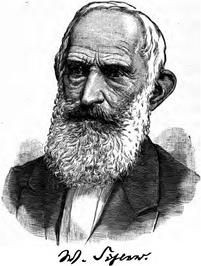
- Wilhelm Sihler
- Born: November 12, 1801; Bernstadt, Germany
- Died: October 27, 1885 (aged 83)
- Children: Ernest Gottlieb Sihler
- Religion: Lutheran
- Ordained: Evangelical Lutheran Joint Synod of Ohio, June 1844
- Congregations served: St. Paul's Lutheran Church, Fort Wayne, Indiana

Wilhelm Sihler (November 12, 1801 – October 27, 1885) was a German American Lutheran minister. A proponent for Christian education, Wilhelm Sihler founded Concordia Theological Seminary, in Fort Wayne, Indiana.

== Biography ==
Wilhelm Sihler was born in Germany in Bernstadt, near Breslau, in the historical region of Lower Silesia. He studied in Berlin 1826–29. He was employed as a private tutor in Breslau during 1829 and 1830. He was an instructor at a private college in Dresden during 1830. From 1838 until 1843 he worked as a private tutor within the Baltic area.

Sihler immigrated to the United States in 1843. He served as a teacher in Pomeroy, Ohio, and vicinity during 1844. He was ordained within the Evangelical Lutheran Joint Synod of Ohio in June 1844. Sihler served as the third pastor of St. Paul's Lutheran Church, Fort Wayne, Indiana.

Wilhelm Sihler had arrived in America as the result of a call for help by F.C.D. Wyneken. Pastor Wyneken had arrived in Fort Wayne in 1838 to find that the only pastor in Indiana had died a few days before. Shocked at the condition of the Lutheran church in the area, Wyneken returned to Germany to search for new pastors willing to emigrate. In June 1841, Pastor Wyneken met with and sought assistance from Dr. Wilhelm Löhe. Sihler was one of those who read Wyneken's The Distress of the German Lutherans in North America (German: Die Noth der deutschen Lutheraner in Nordamerika) and decided to leave his home country for America.

In September 1846, Wilhelm Sihler started a small seminary in the parsonage at St. Paul's Lutheran Church of Fort Wayne. This marked the foundation of the Concordia Theological Seminary. The seminary trains pastors for the Lutheran Church–Missouri Synod. Sihler was also the father of prominent classicist Ernest Gottlieb Sihler.

Sihler encouraged zeal and love for the Word of God and the Lutheran Confessions. He especially criticized the General Synod for lacking these, claiming that their leaders, for example, Samuel Simon Schmucker, were apostate "open counterfeiters, Calvinists, Methodists, and Unionists... traitors and destroyers of the Lutheran Church".

== Selected writings ==
=== Books ===
- Sihler, Wilhelm (1862). Predigten über die Sonn- und Festtags-Evangelien des Kirchenjahres: nebst einem Anhange. Fort Wayne, IN: Verlag von Aug. Siemon u. Bro. OCLC 19025601.
- ——— (1874). Predigten über die Sonn- und Festtags-Episteln des Kirchenjahres. Dresden: J. Naumann. OCLC 16795046.
- ——— (1879). Lebenslauf von W. Sihler: Auf mehrfaches Begehren von ihm selber beschrieben (Vol. 1). St. Louis: Lutherischen Concordia-Velags. OCLC 7092905.
- ——— (1880). Lebenslauf von W. Sihler: Auf mehrfaches Begehren von ihm selber beschrieben (Vol. 2). St. Louis: Lutherischen Concordia-Velags. OCLC 7092905.

=== Journal articles ===
- ——— (7 July 1883). "To What Intent Does God Afflict Us With Sickness?". The Lutheran Witness. 2 (4): 31–32.
