= NELC =

NELC may refer to:

- Northern Evangelical Lutheran Church
- Near Eastern Languages and Cultures/Civilizations, a name for Middle Eastern studies
- National Environmental Law Center
- National Employment Law Center
- National Equipment Leasing Corporation
- National Electronic Library for Cancers
- Naval Electronics Laboratory Center
- National E-Learning Centre (Egypt)
- National Evangelical Lutheran Church US base church body 1898–1964
