= F. C. D. Wyneken =

German-American missionary (1810–1876)

Friedrich Conrad Dietrich Wyneken
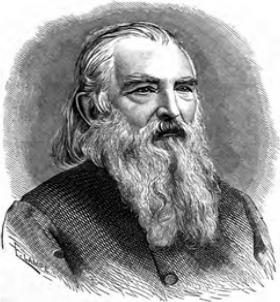
- F. C. D. Wyneken
- Born: May 13, 1810; Verden an der Aller, Germany
- Died: May 4, 1876 (aged 65); San Francisco, California, US
- Education: University of Halle
- Parent(s): Heinrich Christoph Wyneken and Anne Catherine Louise Wyneken nee Meyer
- Religion: Lutheran
- Ordained: May 8, 1837
- Offices held: President of Lutheran Church–Missouri Synod (1850–1864)

Friedrich Conrad Dietrich Wyneken (May 13, 1810 – May 4, 1876) was a missionary pastor in the United States. He also served for fourteen years as the second president of the Lutheran Church – Missouri Synod, and helped found Concordia Theological Seminary.

One hundred years after fellow Hanoverian Henry Muhlenberg brought together the pastors and congregations of colonial America, Wyneken worked with C. F. W. Walther to gather scattered German Protestants into confessional Lutheran congregations and forge them into a closely knit family of churches. Wyneken's missionary experience, method, and plan influenced American Lutheran missions for many years to come. His appeals to Wilhelm Loehe and other German friends brought many German pastors, including Wilhelm Sihler, from Germany to America. He has been called the "thunder after the lightning." He is commemorated on the Calendar of Saints of the Lutheran Church – Missouri Synod on May 4.

Considered a "tireless" church worker by others, Wyneken confessed, rather, that he "suffered horribly from melancholy".

== Early life and family and education ==
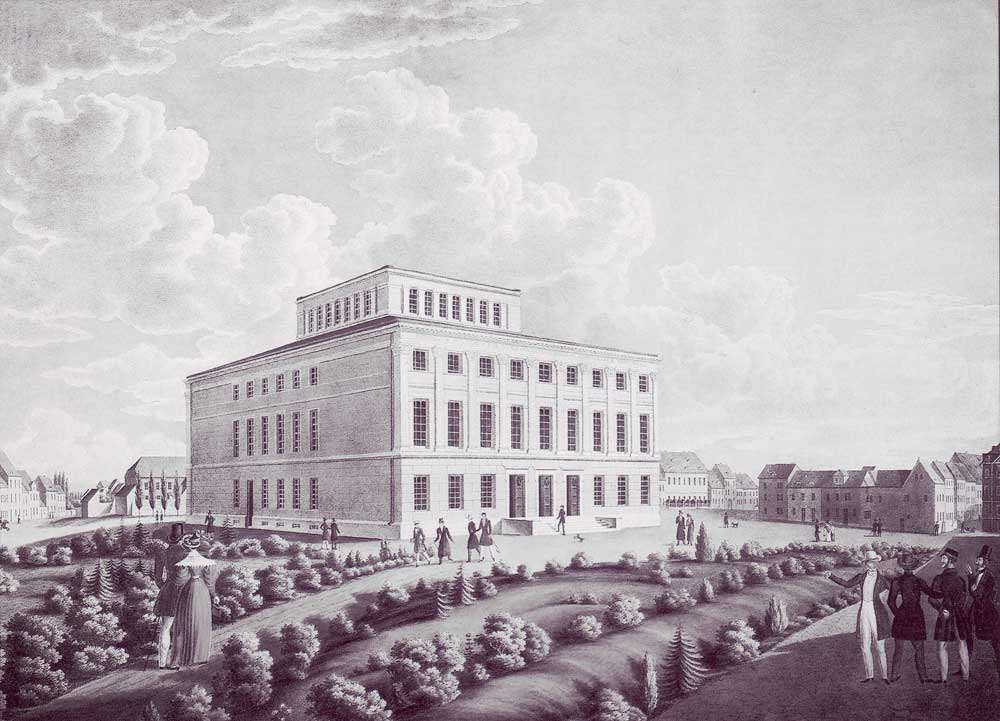
The University of Halle in 1836

Wyneken was born to Pastor Heinrich Christoph Wyneken and Anne Catherine Louise Wyneken née Meyer on May 13, 1810, in Verden an der Aller in the Kingdom of Westphalia. Some of the earlier Wynekens and their relatives were minor government officials in the Duchy of Bremen-Verden when it was under Swedish control. The Wyneken family had an established Lutheran heritage long before Friedrich arrived in America. Heinrich Wyneken's father, grandfather, and one brother were pastors in Hanover. Two of Friedrich Wyneken's older brothers also became pastors. Significant numbers of more distant relatives and in-laws were also Lutheran clergy members, such as Superintendent Hans Heinrich Justus Phillip Ruperti, (1833–1899), who was Friedrich's nephew.

Other Wyneken relatives had military careers in the Electorate of Hanover and others would serve in army of the Kingdom of Hanover. Friedrich Wyneken's maternal grandfather was a Rittmeister stationed in Verden. Wyneken's second cousin Christian Wilhelm August Johann Ernst Wyneken (1783–1853) fought in the King's German Legion in Spain and at the Battle of Waterloo and later became a Lieutenant General in the Hanoverian Army and led a German contingent in the First Schleswig War. Much later a third cousin, Hans Kannengiesser (1880–1970), would fight at Gallipoli and later become a generalleutnant.

Wyneken was baptized on May 22, 1810, by his father at St. Andreas Church in Verden. Heinrich Wyneken died five years later, leaving eleven children and a widow behind. Friedrich attended the gymnasium in Verden. At the age of 17 he went to the University of Göttingen but soon enrolled at the University of Halle. Neither of these institutions had a reputation for the dogmatic Lutheran orthodoxy which Wyneken was later to embrace; rather they both promoted strong rationalistic viewpoints. At Halle, Wyneken became a student of August Tholuck, a skilled linguist and a believer in the personal religious experience.

After graduation, Wyneken worked as a private instructor in Lesum (now a locality of Bremen) at the home of Consistorial Counsellor Georg von Henfstengel, himself an "Awakened" pastor. During this time Wyneken became more influenced by the Erweckungsbewegung ("Awakening" movement) led by August Tholuck. He was ordained in Stade along with his fellow theology student E. W. Wolff on May 8, 1837, and soon the pair secured free passage to America from an "Awakened" sea-captain, Stuerge, and the blessing of the Stade Bible and Mission Society.

== Emigration to America ==
In early 1838, Wyneken sailed across the Atlantic Ocean and arrived in Baltimore, Maryland. He noted that the following year, 5000 fellow Germans arrived weekly in the relatively nearby port of Philadelphia, Pennsylvania, alone, most fleeing economic hardship, warfare, and political repression in the various German states—and that emigration would continue until the American Civil War. Wyneken worked in Baltimore helping the ailing Rev. Johann Heaesbaert and a mixed congregation of Lutherans and Reformed (Moravians) for about a year.

Then, as his mentor recovered, the Pennsylvania Ministerium of Lutherans sent Wyneken westward to serve the many Protestant German farmers who had moved into Ohio, Indiana, and Michigan. In Pittsburgh, Pennsylvania, he met C. F. Schmidt, editor of Lutherische Kirchenzeitung, who would become a friend and supporter, but continued his evangelism westward. In Putnam and Allen counties in Ohio, Wyneken found Lutherans who had not heard a sermon in years, so he baptized many children, and decided to tell his fellow ministers still in Germany about the massive need for their ministry in the New World. However, first he ministered to Germans in Fort Wayne, Indiana, and the nearby settlement of Friedheim, Preble Township, in northwest Adams County, whose pastor, Jesse Hoover, had died in May 1838. Then he made Fort Wayne, a portage and canal town, his base, and traveled among the isolated settlements on the Michigan Road to the north as well as in central Indiana and western Ohio.

He joined the Evangelical Lutheran Synod of the West (despite misgivings about its ecumenical stance), and also appealed to the Evangelical Lutheran General Synod of the United States of North America for more clergy, especially for the frustrating missionary survey work, when the isolated German protestants wanted to establish their own church communities. While the General Synod did not have resources, various missionary societies in Germany did. Already in 1840, the Bremen (missionary) Society for Protestant Germans had sent two missionary pastors to America, and they sent another five in 1842.

On August 31, 1841, he married Sophia Marie Wilhelmine Buuch (1824–1891), daughter of the first settler in Friedheim. That same year, the Stade missionary society sent G. Jensen to cover Wyneken's pastoral responsibilities at St. Paul's Evangelical Lutheran Church in Fort Wayne while he and his wife returned to Germany for medical treatment of a throat ailment. There, Wyneken published Die Noth der deutschen Lutheraner in Nordamerika (English translation: The Distress of the German Lutherans in North America). This, together with his personal contacts and correspondence with Wilhelm Loehe as well as mission societies in Hanover, Bremen, Erlangen, Breslau, Leipzig, and Berlin over the next year while he received medical treatment (and began raising his first child), inspired many German ministers and theology students (22 trained by Loehe himself) to emigrate to America.

While Wyneken returned to the United States in May 1843 with Adolf Biewend (who soon accepted a call from a congregation near Washington, D.C.), Loehe and Rev. Johann Friedrich Wucherer worked in Germany to send missionaries to North America, publishing Kirchliche Mitteilungen aus und ueber Nord-Amerika. In 1845, Wyneken became the delegate of the Synod of the West to the General Synod. He then accepted a call of a Baltimore congregation, where he served for five years, then moved to St. Louis for four years.

Wyneken worked with C. F. W. Walther, who had founded Concordia Seminary in St. Louis and had become the first president of the Lutheran Church – Missouri Synod. Wyneken succeeded Walther and served as the Missouri Synod's second president for 14 years.

== Later life and death ==
When Wyneken's health declined, he moved to Cleveland and assisted his son, who was also a pastor, for a decade. He then traveled to California, where his daughter lived and where he hoped the climate would help his health. Friedrich Conrad Dietrich Wyneken died in San Francisco on May 4, 1876. His son-in-law, Pastor Buehler, preached at the emotional funeral.

Religious titles
Preceded by C. F. W. Walther	President; Lutheran Church–Missouri Synod; 1850–1864	Succeeded by C. F. W. Walther
