= Heinrich Christian Schwan =

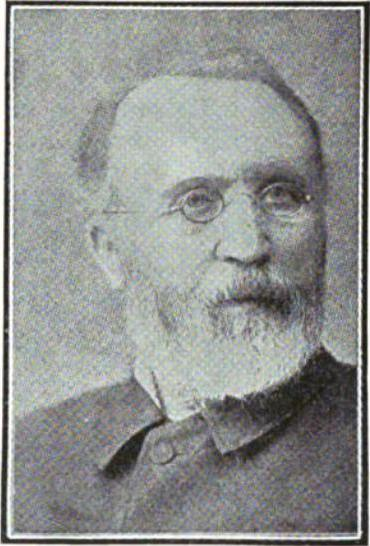
- Born: April 5, 1819; Horneburg, Kingdom of Hanover
- Died: May 29, 1905 (aged 86); Cleveland, Ohio
- Spouse: Emma Matilda Edmunde Blume Schwan
- Church: Lutheran Church–Missouri Synod (LCMS)
- Ordained: 1843
- Congregations served: Cleveland, Ohio
- Offices held: President, LCMS (1878-1899)

Heinrich Christian Schwan (April 5, 1819 – May 29, 1905), a German Lutheran pastor, was the third president of the Lutheran Church–Missouri Synod (LCMS), from 1878 to 1899. He earlier served as a missionary in Brazil, as the pastor of Zion Lutheran Church in Cleveland, Ohio, and as president of the LCMS's Central District. He was responsible for the LCMS's first exposition of Martin Luther's Small Catechism, known as the "Schwan Catechism".

Schwan was the son of the Rev. Georg Heinrich Christian Schwan, an Evangelical Lutheran pastor in northern Germany, and his first wife, Charlotte Wyneken. He was also the half-brother of Major General Theodore Schwan.

Schwan has been credited with being the first pastor to erect a Christmas tree in an American church sanctuary when he and his wife erected one at Zion Lutheran in 1851, located then at the corner of Lakeside Avenue and East Sixth Street in Cleveland. A plaque commemorating the event has been placed at the site by the Cleveland Landmarks Commission. However, research has shown that there was at least one prior instance, namely by Rev. John Muehlhaeuser in Rochester, New York, in 1840.

He died in Cleveland on May 29, 1905. He and his wife are buried in Lake View Cemetery in that city.

Religious titles
Preceded by C. F. W. Walther	President; Lutheran Church–Missouri Synod; 1878–1899	Succeeded by Franz Pieper
