= Johann Konrad Wilhelm Löhe =

Lutheran pastor, Theologian, Professor of Theology (1808–1872)

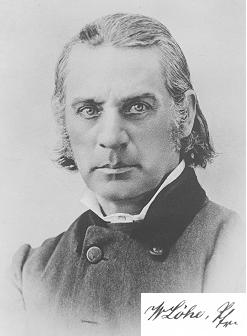
- Photograph of Wilhelm Loehe
- Born: 21 February 1808; Fürth, Middle Franconia
- Died: 2 January 1872 (aged 63); Neuendettelsau, Bavaria
- Education: University of Erlangen
- Religion: Lutheran
- Ordained: 1831

Johann Konrad Wilhelm Löhe (21 February 1808 – 2 January 1872) (often rendered 'Loehe') was a pastor of the Lutheran Church, Confesional Lutheran writer, and is often regarded as being a founder of the deaconess movement in Lutheranism and a founding sponsor of the Lutheran Church–Missouri Synod (LCMS). From the small town of Neuendettelsau, he sent pastors to North America, Australia, New Guinea, Brazil, and Ukraine. His work for a clear confessional basis within the Bavarian church sometimes led to conflict with the ecclesiastical bureaucracy. His chief concern was that a parish find its life in the eucharist, and from that source evangelism and social ministries would flow. Many Lutheran congregations in Michigan, Ohio, and Iowa were either founded or influenced by missionaries sent by Löhe. He is commemorated on 2 January by the calendars of both the LCMS and the Evangelical Lutheran Church in America.

== Birth and early life ==
Löhe was born on 21 February 1808 in the town of Fürth in present-day Middle Franconia. The son of a shopkeeper, his father died in 1816 and he seemed to have had a very lonely childhood. He received his basic education from C. L. Roth's gymnasium in Nuremberg and was admitted to theological study at the University of Erlangen in 1826. He was heavily influenced by the Reformed professors of theology Christian Krafft and Thomas von Kempen. Ultimately, he was introduced to the Lutheran Confessions and became a Lutheran under the teaching of David Hollaz. In 1828 he spent a term at the University of Berlin, attracted not so much by the lectures of the professors as by the sermons of the famous preachers. Löhe graduated from the Erlangen in 1830, but waited until 1831 before receiving a pastoral assignment to Kirchenlamitz in Upper Franconia (Northeastern Bavaria).

== Pastoral work ==
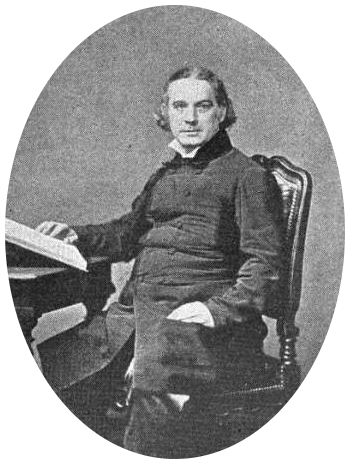
Johann Konrad Wilhelm Löhe

Löhe's work in Fürth was a troubled one. His fervent evangelical preaching attracted large congregations and puzzled the ecclesiastical authorities. A similar experience ensued at Nürnberg, where, as assistant pastor of St. Egidien (St. Giles), he was often criticized for his sermons and his anti-pietistic leanings. He transferred through a series of parishes before settling in the village of Neuendettelsau, Bavaria, about 30 kilometres (19 mi) from Fürth, in 1837 after failing to gain an assignment in an urban setting. He was married that same year.

By most accounts, Löhe was an ideal pastor who interacted well with a variety of different classes of people. He focused his theological studies on the Lutheran Confessions and put considerable thought into the celebration of Holy Communion as the center of congregational life. Löhe was especially interested in old Lutheran liturgies. Löhe was also noted for his ontological view of the pastoral office, which he believed existed independently of congregational call as a direct appointment from Jesus Christ through ordination, with respect to which position he found himself in opposition to C. F. W. Walther. He combined all these ideas with a heavy insistence on social renewal. Löhe endured strained relations with the regional authorities over articulating a clear confessional status for the church during a period from 1848 until 1852. At one point, he even considered leaving the church, though ultimately he was able to resolve differences between himself and the church leadership.

=== Missionary work ===
Despite being confined to a pastorate in an out-of-the-way village, which he never left, Löhe nevertheless exhibited a keen interest in missionary work. He was particularly concerned about the condition of German immigrants to North America. He solicited funds through a variety of sources to help bolster the spiritual state of the immigrant population beginning in 1841.

In 1843, responding to F.C.D. Wyneken's Die Noth der deutschen Lutheraner in Nordamerika (English: The Distress of the German Lutherans in North America), Löhe and Rev. Johann Friedrich Wucherer established the Kirchliche Mittheilungen aus und über Nord-Amerika (English: Church News about and from North America) in order to raise support on behalf of the needs of German Lutheran immigrants in America.

Löhe also encouraged the sending of pastors to North America to assist the settlers and help with conversion of the Native American populations. To this end, he constructed two schools to train missionaries, one of which became Wartburg College in Waverly, Iowa, and the other which is now Concordia Theological Seminary in Fort Wayne, Indiana. Individuals sent by Löhe were instrumental in the founding of the Evangelical Lutheran Joint Synod of Ohio, though Löhe withdrew his support from that synod in 1845 over doctrinal differences.

Löhe's emissaries were among the founders of the LCMS in 1846. In 1853, Löhe supporters established the Evangelical Lutheran Synod of Iowa. While Löhe is most well remembered for his encouragement of missionary activity in the United States, he also supported work in Brazil, Ukraine, Australia, and New Guinea through his Foreign Missionary Society (German: Gesellschaft für Innere und Äußere Mission im Sinne der Evangelisch-Lutherischen Kirche).

=== Deaconess community ===
In addition to being concerned about foreign matters, Löhe retained a concern for domestic social matters. Here he saw the bad situation of many unmarried girls and young women. In the rural society they had a very underprivileged status and suffered from lack of education. In this spirit, he founded the first Deaconess Mother House in 1849. The house became a place of social and education activity, hosting schools, hospitals, and other social agencies. The deaconesses lived in celibacy and in a spiritual-economic community.

== Legacy ==
Löhe died in Neuendettelsau on 2 January 1872 at the age of sixty-three, having influenced the life of the Lutheran Church on five continents. The chapel at Wartburg Theological Seminary in Dubuque, Iowa, and an academic building at Concordia Theological Seminary in Fort Wayne, Indiana, are dedicated to his memory. He had significant influence on missions, confessionalism, and liturgics as it relates to Lutheranism. He is considered one of the main persons associated with Neo-Lutheranism.

== Writings ==
- Samenkörner des Gebetes (this is 4th, out of over 30 ed.)
  - Seed-grains of Prayer: A Manual for Evangelical Christians (Samenkörner des Gebetes translated into English by H. A. Weller, complete work online)
- Sieben Predigten (Nürnberg, 1836)
- Predigten über das Vaterunser (1837)
- Erinnerungen aus der Reformationsgeschichte von Franken (Nürnberg, 1847)
- Drei Bücher von der Kirche (1845) - his main work, concerning ecclesiology known in English "Three Books on the Church"
- Haus-, Schul- und Kirchenbuch für Christen lutherischen Bekenntnisses (Stuttgart, 1845)
- Agende für christliche Gemeinden (1848). - Lutheran service book
- Die bayerische Generalsynode vom Frühjahr 1849 und das Lutherische Bekenntnis (Nürnberg, 1849)
- Unsere kirchliche Lage (Nördlingen, 1850)
- Kirche und Amt, neue Aphorismen (Erlangen, 1851)
- Der evangelische Geistliche (2 volumes, 1852–58)
- Etwas aus der Geschichte des Diaconissenhauses Neuendettelsau. 3. Auflage. Gütersloh: C. Bertelsmann, 1907.

== See also ==
- Evangelical catholic
- William Augustus Mühlenberg
- Johann Flierl
- Frankenmuth, Michigan
