= National Evangelical Lutheran Church =

Finnish-American church body

- Abbreviation: NELC
- Classification: Protestant
- Orientation: Lutheran
- Theology: Confessional Lutheranism
- Polity: Congregational
- Region: Midwest, esp. Upper Peninsula of Michigan and northeastern Minnesota
- Origin: 1898; Rock Springs, Wyoming
- Merged into: Lutheran Church–Missouri Synod (1964)
- Congregations: 53 (1962)
- Members: 11,142 (1962)
- Ministers: 35 (1962)
- Other name(s): Finnish Evangelical Lutheran National Church of America (1898–1946)

The National Evangelical Lutheran Church (NELC) was a Finnish-American Lutheran church body that was organized in 1898 in Rock Springs, Wyoming, as the Finnish Evangelical Lutheran National Church of America. It merged into the Lutheran Church – Missouri Synod (LCMS) in 1965.

== History ==
In 1898, a group of Finnish Lutherans, eight laymen and a pastor, organized the Finnish Evangelical Lutheran National Church of America in Rock Springs, Wyoming. Although its founding had occurred in Wyoming, many of the congregations were located in the Upper Peninsula of Michigan, especially around Calumet, as well as the Iron Range of northeastern Minnesota.

The NELC was the smallest of three Finnish-American Lutheran churches in the United States. Several years earlier, in 1890, the Finnish Evangelical Lutheran Church of America (known as the Suomi Synod) had been founded in Calumet. The group that formed the NELC had either left the Suomi Synod or had never joined it due to differences in doctrine and issues of congregational freedom and autonomy. The other Finnish-American body was the Apostolic Lutheran Church of America, founded in 1872, also in Calumet, as the Solomon Korteniemi Lutheran Society.

Within a few years of founding, the NELC became connected with the Gospel Association of the Evangelical Lutheran Church of Finland, and became known as the Synod of Finnish "Evangelicals" because they stressed the forgiveness of sins, certainty of salvation, Baptismal regeneration, and the right of sinners to accept forgiveness without undertaking specific preparations beforehand other than having a "feeling" of sin.

A college for training pastors and teaching English to Finnish immigrants was started in Duluth, Minnesota, soon after 1900. However, because it was organized as an open shareholders association, atheistic socialists were able to gain control and closed the seminary in 1905 before a single pastor had graduated, and converted the school into a workers college. From 1905 to 1918, the synod's pastors received no academic training other than getting preaching instruction from the Gospel Association.

Due to financial issues soon after 1900, the NELC sought a possible merger with the Suomi Synod. Because that synod would not accept the lay-trained pastors of the NELC, the latter opened a new seminary in Ironwood, Michigan, in 1918. However, that seminary was closed in 1923 when one teacher left to go to Japan and another returned to Finland. Overtures to the Suomi Synod subsequently ceased, and the NELC instead established fellowship with the Lutheran Church – Missouri Synod in 1923. By 1931, the NELC was using the LCMS's Concordia Theological Seminary, located at that time in Springfield, Illinois, for its pastoral training. In 1938, a member of the NELC was appointed professor and head of the Finnish department at the seminary.

Doctrinal conflict arose within the NELC soon after fellowship with the LCMS had been implemented. The "Missourians" who favored the LCMS doctrinal stance broke fellowship with the Gospel Association because it had remained in the Church of Finland. The "Missourians" also held that Christians could not be members of lodges. The conflict resulted in a number of "Evangelicals" leaving NELC congregations. By 1958, all the synod's pastors were graduates of LCMS seminaries, thereby cementing the relationship between the two church bodies.

Mission work was aimed at Finnish immigrants in the U.S. and Canada. In 1950, a missionary began serving Finns in North Queensland, Australia. Later, the NELC gave money to support the LCMS missionaries in Papua New Guinea.

The denomination changed its name to the National Evangelical Lutheran Church in 1946. Eighteen years later, on January 1, 1964, the NELC merged with the LCMS, its congregations becoming members of the LCMS districts in which they were located. However, several congregations did not join in the merger. One joined the Lutheran Churches of the Reformation, and three others (Hebron in Toronto, Bethany in New York City, and National in Calumet) became independent congregations.

== Presidents ==
The presidents of the NELC were:

- J. W. Eloheimo (1898–1900)
- Wilhelm Adrian Mandellöf (1900–1905)
- William Williamson (1905–1908)
- Karl Gustaf Rissanen (1908–1913)
- Peter Wuori (1913–1918)
- Arne Wasunta (1918–1922)
- Karl E. Salonen (1922–1923)
- Matti Wiskari (1923–1931)
- Gustaf A. Aho (1931–1953)
- Jalo E. Nopola (1953–1959)
- Emil A. Heino (1959–1963)
- Vilho V. Latvala (1963–1964)

== Membership statistics ==
NECL Membership Statistics
Year	Pastors	Congregations	Members
1902	18		10,300
1925	16	60	5,000
1929	15	65	4,625
1935	14	59	7,904
1937	-	69	-
1940	-	65	6,275
1942	-	72	5,928
1947	-	65	6,559
1950	22	71	7,147
1951	23	71	7,530
1952	26	60	6,768
1953	25	60	7,148
1954	27	58	7,906
1955	26	58	7,282
1956	33	59	7,561
1957	25	57	8,428
1958	33	57	9,195
1959	34	54	9,772
1960	29	55	10,146
1961	35	56	10,545
1962	35	53	11,142
