= C. F. W. Walther =

Lutheran theologian and founder of the Lutheran Church – Missouri Synod

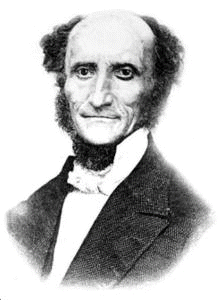
- Born: October 25, 1811; Langenchursdorf, Kingdom of Saxony
- Died: May 7, 1887 (aged 75); St Louis, Missouri, U.S.
- Education: University of Leipzig
- Spouse: Emilie Buenger

Ecclesiastical career
- Church: Lutheran Church–Missouri Synod (LCMS)
- Ordained: January 15, 1837
- Writings: The Proper Distinction Between Law and Gospel, Church and Ministry, Der Lutheraner (periodical)
- Congregations: Trinity Lutheran Church
- Offices held: President, LCMS (1847-1850; 1864-1878); President, Concordia Seminary

Carl Ferdinand Wilhelm Walther (October 25, 1811 – May 7, 1887) was a German-American Lutheran minister. He was the first president of the Lutheran Church – Missouri Synod (LCMS) and one of its most influential theologians. He is commemorated by that church on its Calendar of Saints on May 7. He has been described as a man who gave up his homeland for the freedom to speak freely, to believe freely, and to live freely, by emigrating from Germany to the United States.

== Early life and education ==
C. F. W. Walther was born a pastor's son in Langenchursdorf in the Kingdom of Saxony (part of modern-day Germany). Out of a strong religious commitment, he immigrated to the United States in 1838, initially as a follower of Martin Stephan. On September 21, 1841, he married Emilie Buenger. They had six children. He started two important publications, and was author of many books and periodical articles. He was also the head pastor of the four Saxon Lutheran congregations (called the Gesammtgemeinde) in St. Louis (Trinity, Holy Cross, Immanuel, and Zion). In August 1855, Walther turned down an honorary doctorate from the University of Göttingen, but in 1877 he accepted a Doctor of Theology (Th.D.) degree from Capital University in Columbus, Ohio. He died in St. Louis on May 7, 1887, and was buried at Concordia Cemetery, where a mausoleum was later built in his honor.

Ferdinand, as he was called by his family, was first educated by his father. At the age of eight, he attended school in Hohenstein for two years. He then entered "Latein Schule" ("Latin school", a college preparatory school) in Schneeberg, from which he graduated in September 1829.

One month later he enrolled in the University of Leipzig to begin his study of theology and joined his older brother Otto Hermann, who was enrolled in the same university. During his college years in Leipzig he contracted a near-fatal lung disease and had to interrupt his studies for six months. While ill and recuperating, he assiduously read the works of Martin Luther and became convinced that Luther's theology clearly taught the doctrines of Holy Scripture. He also began believing in the importance of a firm confessional position.

In 1833, Walther took his first exam at the university. This examination allowed him to accept a position as a private tutor for a family in the town of Kahla. The experience of two years' tutoring qualified him to take his second examination in Leipzig and graduate. On January 15, 1837, he was ordained to the Lutheran clergy and became a pastor in the town of Bräunsdorf in Saxony. As part of his pastoral duties, he taught religion classes in the local school. He soon, however, found himself at odds with the rationalistic government of the Kingdom of Saxony because he believed that it had departed from the faith and practice of historic Lutheranism and promoted false doctrine. The lack of orthodoxy also caused many other conservative Lutherans to oppose the Saxon government's liberal religious policies.

== Career ==
=== Exodus from Saxony ===
Walther and several hundred of the other dissenters came together under the leadership of a pastor holding similar views—Martin Stephan from Dresden. In November 1838, under Stephan's direction, 800 Saxon immigrants ("Stephanites") left on five ships for America in what is known as the Saxon Lutheran Migration, hoping for the freedom to practice their religious beliefs. The settlers arrived in New Orleans on January 5, 1839. The group settled both in St. Louis, Missouri, and to the south along the Mississippi River in Perry County, Missouri.

=== Controversy over Bishop Stephan ===
Soon after the immigrants were settled in the new homeland, their leader and self-proclaimed "bishop of the new settlement", Martin Stephan, was accused of financial and sexual misconduct (charges he had also faced in Saxony) and was expelled from the settlement. His departure left Walther as one of leading clergymen remaining.

=== The Altenburg Debate ===
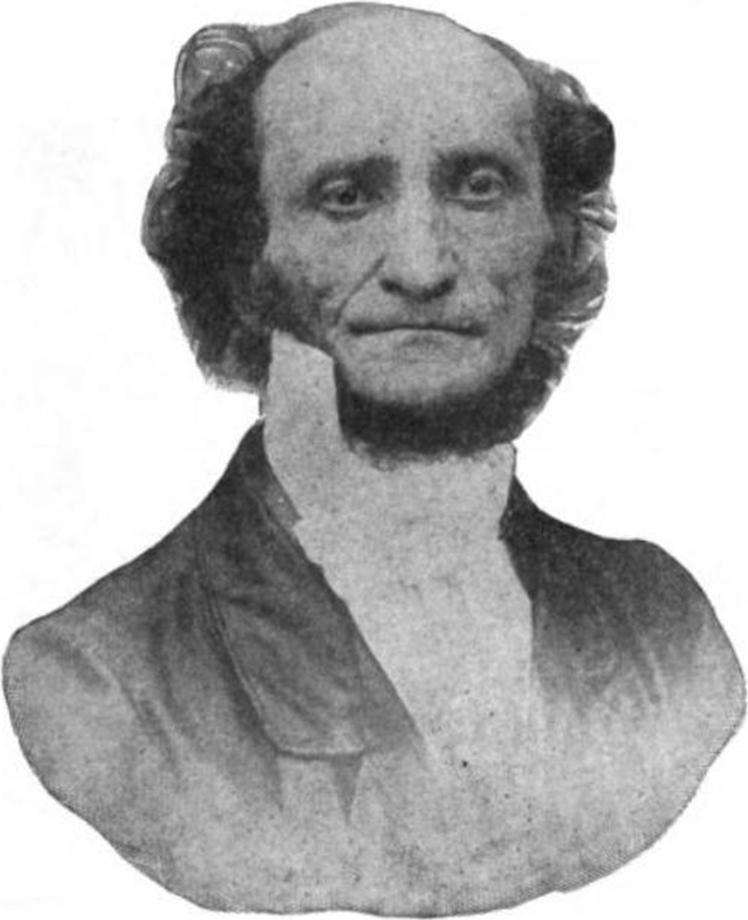

After the fall of Stephan, the group of immigrants was deeply disturbed and unsure whether they were still a Lutheran congregation after having left the authorities and church hierarchy in Germany behind. Walther, who was originally called to be the pastor of a dual parish in the Perry County settlements of Dresden and Johannisberg, struggled over the questions that the laity and other pastors were also asking. In April 1841, soon after his brother Otto Herman, who was pastor of the congregation in St. Louis, had died, a public debate was held between Walther and attorney Marbach, one of the lay leaders of the settlers, in what is known as the "Altenburg Debate". Walther convinced Marbach and most of the other colonists that they could validly consider themselves to be a church. He then accepted the call to his brother's congregation in St. Louis, Trinity Lutheran Church, and served that congregation from May 1841 until his death.

=== Walther's ministry ===
During his forty years of work in the LCMS, Walther held several key positions. A log cabin college, which Walther helped to found, opened in December 1839 in Altenburg and eventually developed into Concordia Seminary in St. Louis. Walther became its first president and held that position for the remainder of his life.

On April 26, 1847, the Lutheran Church – Missouri Synod was founded. Walther served as its first president, a position he held from 1847 to 1850 and again from 1864 to 1878. In 1861, he also became president of the synod's "practical" seminary (today's Concordia Theological Seminary) while it was co-located with Concordia Seminary for several years.

He also founded and edited several Lutheran periodicals, including Der Lutheraner and Lehre und Wehre. He wrote a number of theological books. Perhaps his best known work is The Proper Distinction Between Law and Gospel, which is a transcription of a series of evening lectures he gave at the seminary. He is also the author of the text and tune of the hymn "He's Risen, He's Risen" (German: Erstanden, erstanden ist Jesus Christ) found in the hymnals of the LCMS and other Lutheran bodies.

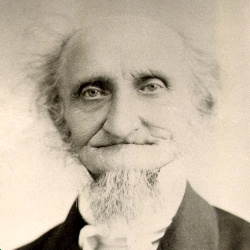
Portrait of an elderly Walther

Walther vigorously opposed the theologies of non-Lutheran denominations in America and the influence of the major secular philosophies and movements on Lutheran thought and practice, and defended the doctrinal and cultural heritage of the Lutheran Church.

== Works ==
=== Bibliography ===
During Walther's lifetime, the LCMS was a German-speaking denomination. Not all of Walther's writings have been translated into English, but those that have include the following:

- Walther, C. F. W. (1939). "False Arguments for the Modern Theory of Open Questions". Concordia Theological Monthly 10 Nos. 4-11:254–262, 351–357, 415–420, 507–513, 587–595, 656–666, 752–759, 827–834.
- Walther, C. F. W., Alexander W. C. Guebert, trans. and ed. (1947) "Why Should Our Pastors, Teachers and Professors Subscribe Unconditionally to the Symbolical Writings of our Church? Essay Delivered at the Western District Convention in 1858" Concordia Theological Monthly No. 4:241–253.
- Walther, C. F. W. (1986). The Proper Distinction Between Law and Gospel. W. H. T. Dau, trans. St. Louis: Concordia Publishing House.
- Walther, C. F. W. (1987). Church and Ministry. J. T. Mueller, trans. St. Louis: Concordia Publishing House.
- Walther, C. F. W. (1987) "Our Duty as Priests" The Lutheran Witness No. 10:11.
- Walther, C. F. W. (2006). Works of Carl Ferdinand Wilhelm Walther, 1811–1887. Fort Wayne: Project Wittenberg.
- Walther, C. F. W. (2010). Law and Gospel: How to Read and Apply the Bible. C. C. Tiews, transl. St. Louis: Concordia Publishing House.
- Walther, C. F. W. (2017). Pastoral Theology. C. C. Tiews, transl. St. Louis: Concordia Publishing House.
- Walther, C. F. W. "The Sheep Judge Their Shepherds

=== Sermons ===
Several of C. F. W. Walther's sermons have been preserved and translated into English by E. Myers and are available online.

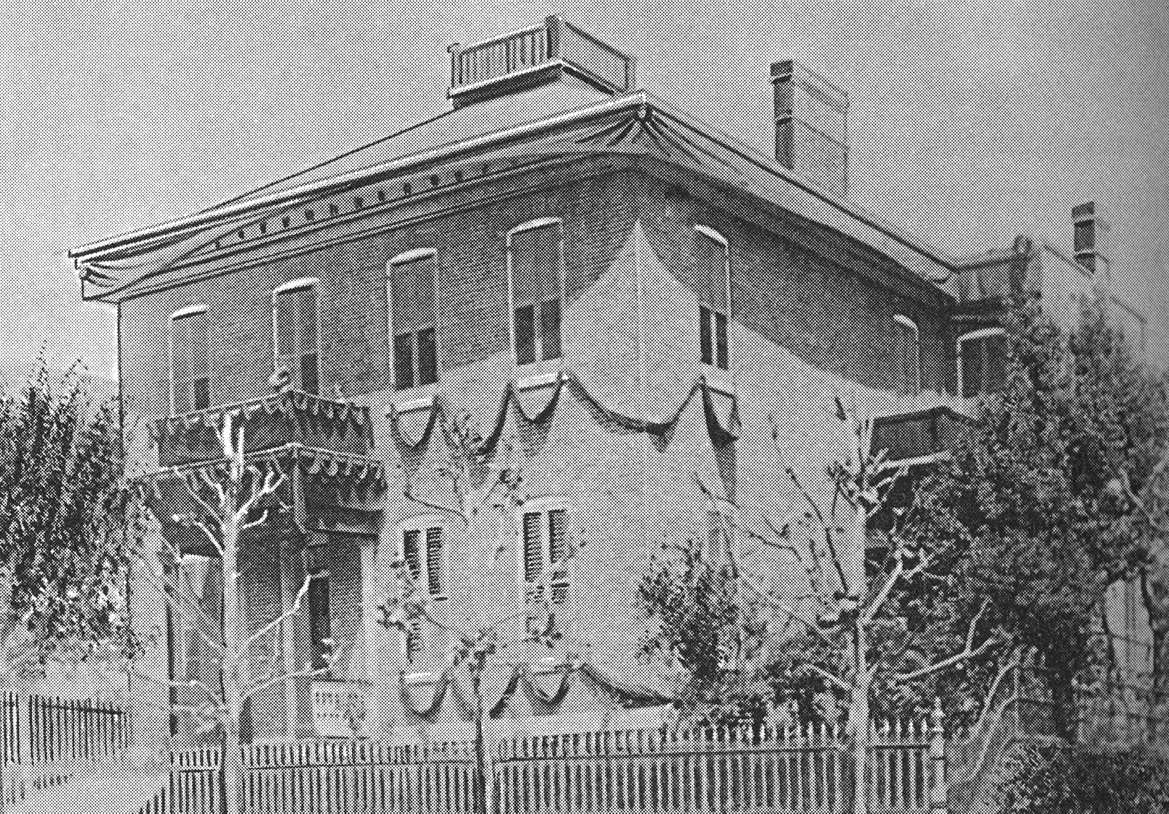
Walther's home on Texas Avenue in St. Louis

== Walther film ==
In 2011, in honor of the 200th anniversary of Walther's birth, Concordia Seminary in St. Louis, Missouri, produced the motion picture Walther that follows the life of Walther, including the history of the LCMS. The seminary distributed the video to all LCMS congregations in October 2011. A study guide and Bible study materials accompanied the video.

== See also ==
- Neo-Lutheranism
- Saxon Lutheran Memorial

== Notes ==
Religious titles
Preceded by Synod founded	President; Lutheran Church–Missouri Synod; 1847–1850	Succeeded by F. C. D. Wyneken
Preceded by F. C. D. Wyneken	President; Lutheran Church–Missouri Synod; 1864–1878	Succeeded by H. C. Schwan
