= Concordia Theological Seminary =

Lutheran seminary in Fort Wayne, Indiana, U.S.

Coordinates: 41°8′21.6″N 85°6′32.8″W

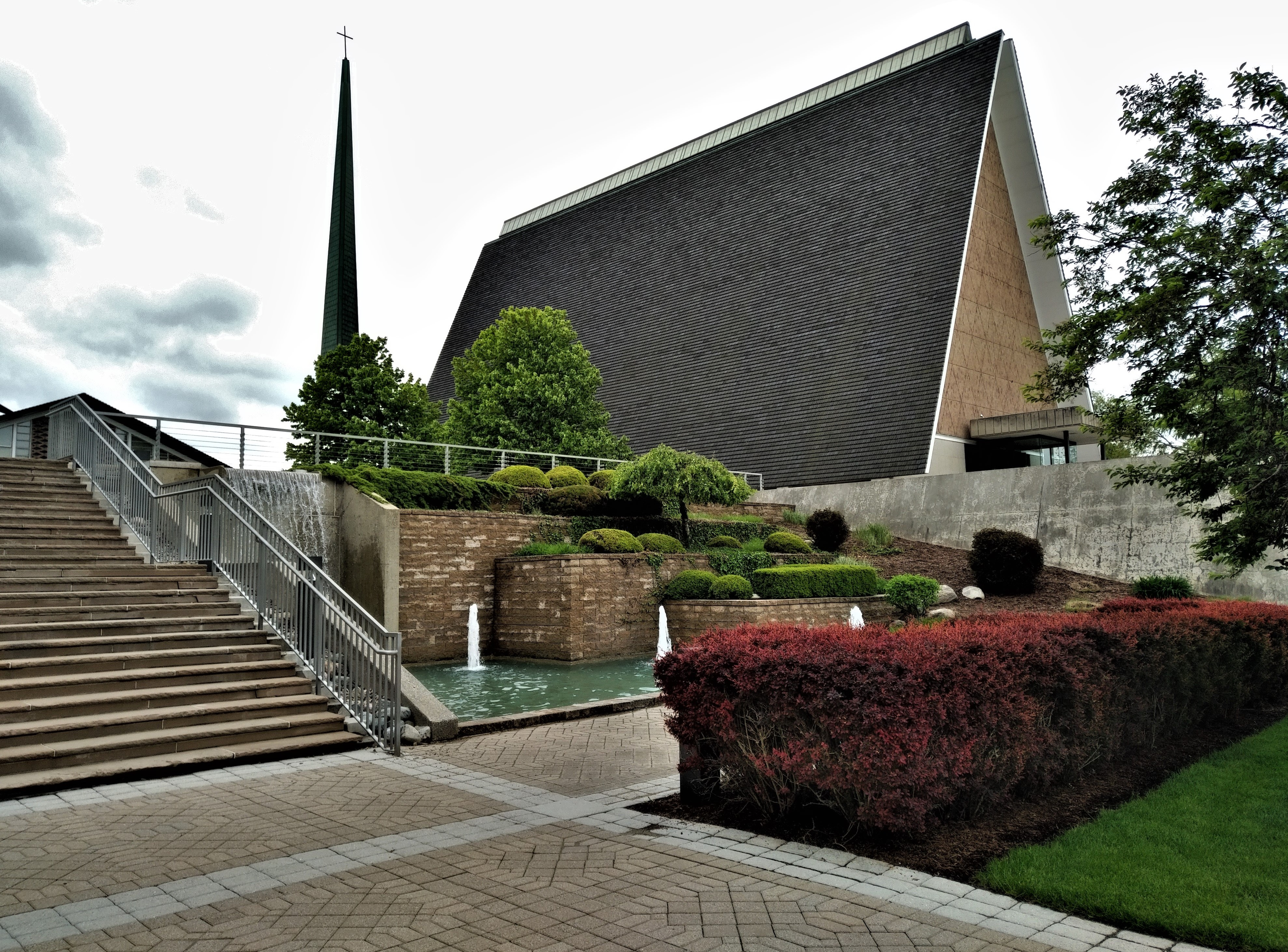
- Type: Seminary
- Established: 1846; 180 years ago
- Religious affiliation: Lutheran Church – Missouri Synod
- President: Jon S. Bruss
- Faculty: 26
- Students: 279
- Location: Fort Wayne, Indiana, United States
- Campus: 191 acres (77 ha); Major city
- Website: www.ctsfw.edu

Concordia Theological Seminary is a Lutheran seminary in Fort Wayne, Indiana, United States. It offers professional, master's degrees, and doctoral degrees affiliated with training clergy and deaconesses for the Lutheran Church – Missouri Synod (LCMS).

== History ==
=== Formation in Fort Wayne ===
In 1844, Frederick C. D. Wyneken, pastor of the Lutheran church in Fort Wayne, Indiana, began pastoral training of two young men. Wyneken took a call in 1845 to a congregation in Baltimore, Maryland, and was replaced by Wilhelm Sihler, who continued the training. Wyneken had earlier written to Wilhelm Loehe in Germany, requesting help in providing pastors for German Lutheran immigrants to the United States, and in August 1846 eleven theological students and their instructor arrived in Fort Wayne, having been sent by Loehe. The seminary was formally organized at that time, with Sihler becoming the first president. Classes were held in the parsonage, and a four-room house was rented for use as a dormitory.

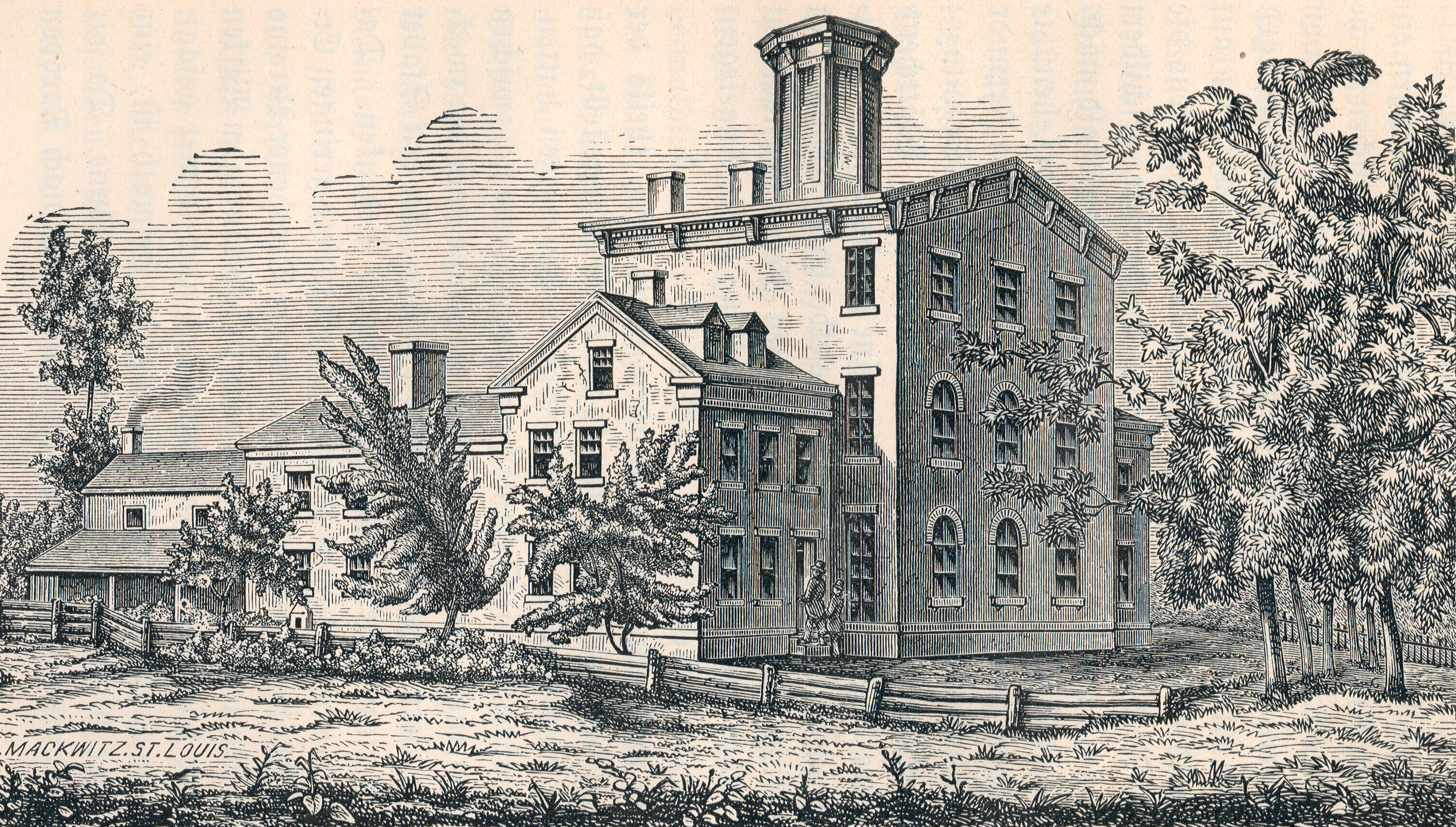
Concordia Theological Seminary in Fort Wayne, Indiana, in 1860

The Lutheran Church – Missouri Synod was organized in 1847, and in response to the new synod's request, Loehe transferred ownership of the seminary to the synod. He continued to support the seminary by sending money, books, and students from Germany. Two years later the seminary purchased 14 acres (5.7 ha) about 1 mile (1.6 km) east of Fort Wayne and erected the first building on its new campus.

Within the synod the seminary was referred to as the "practical seminary" because its purpose was to quickly provide pastors for congregations. It provided both pre-seminary and seminary instruction. The pre-seminary course of work was similar to that of a high school, and the seminary classes provided enough theological training to enable the graduates to serve the congregations. However, the seminary did not require knowledge of the Biblical languages (Greek and Hebrew).

=== Relocation to St. Louis ===
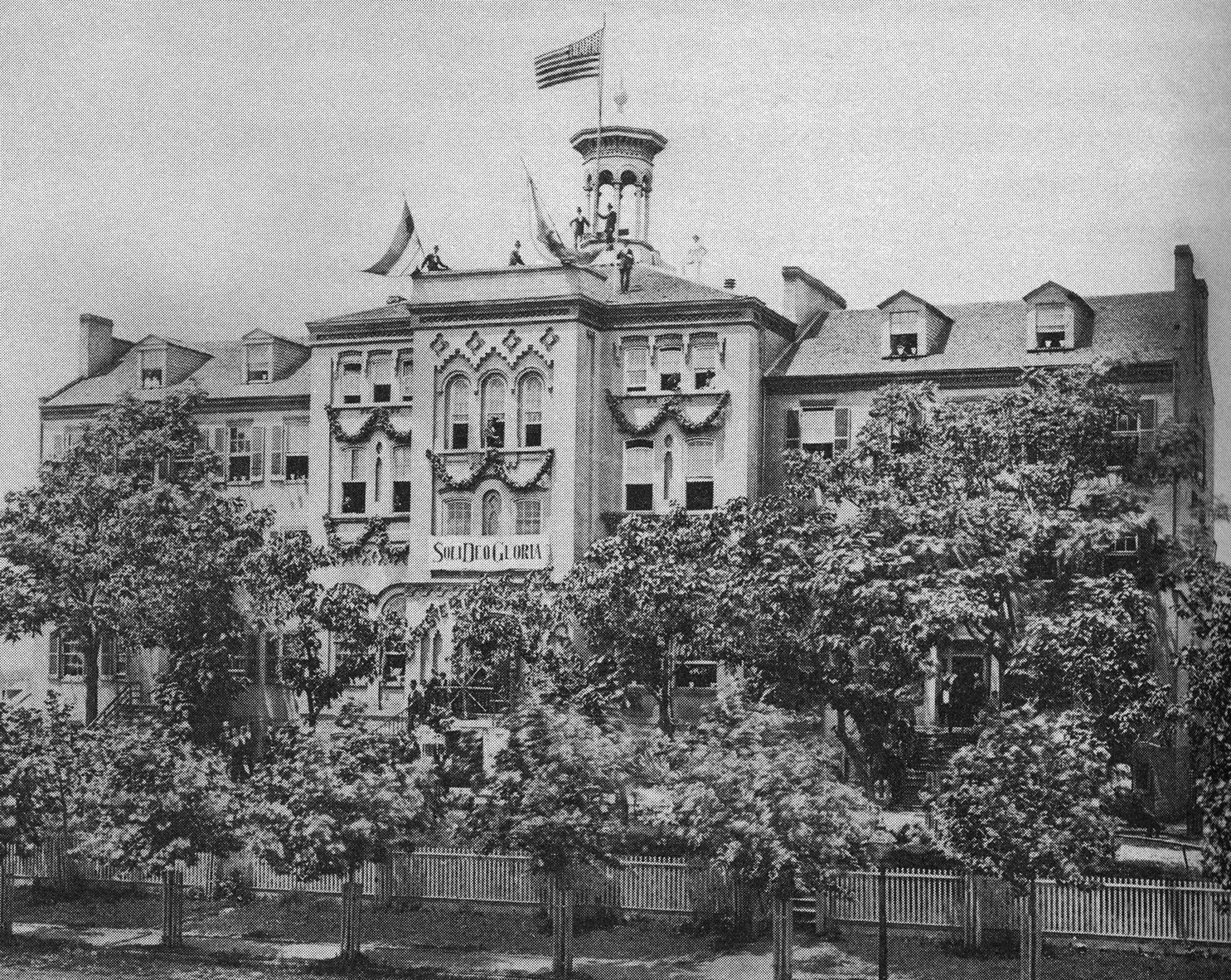
Concordia Seminary building in St Louis, Missouri on June 11, 1875, decorated for the departure of the last contingent of students of the practical seminary for Springfield, Illinois

To protect its students from the draft during the American Civil War, the seminary moved, in 1861, to the campus of the synod's academic seminary, Concordia Seminary, in St. Louis, Missouri. Missouri exempted theological students from the draft, while Indiana did not. C. F. W. Walther, who was already the president of the St. Louis seminary, became president of the practical seminary as well. However, there was friction between the two institutions among both faculty and students, in part due to the differences in academic rigor and purposes. In addition, the growth in enrollment in both seminaries led to overcrowding of the campus.

=== Relocation to Springfield ===
In 1874, the 29 pre-seminary students of the practical seminary, along with one instructor, were moved to the campus of the former Illinois State University in Springfield, Illinois. That campus had been purchased by Trinity Lutheran Church in that city in 1873 to start the Evangelical Lutheran Female College and Normal School, but inability to obtain suitable faculty had stopped those plans. In 1875, the practical seminary itself moved to the Springfield campus, with president F. A. Craemer and the pre-seminary instructor serving as the faculty. A third faculty member joined the staff in 1876.

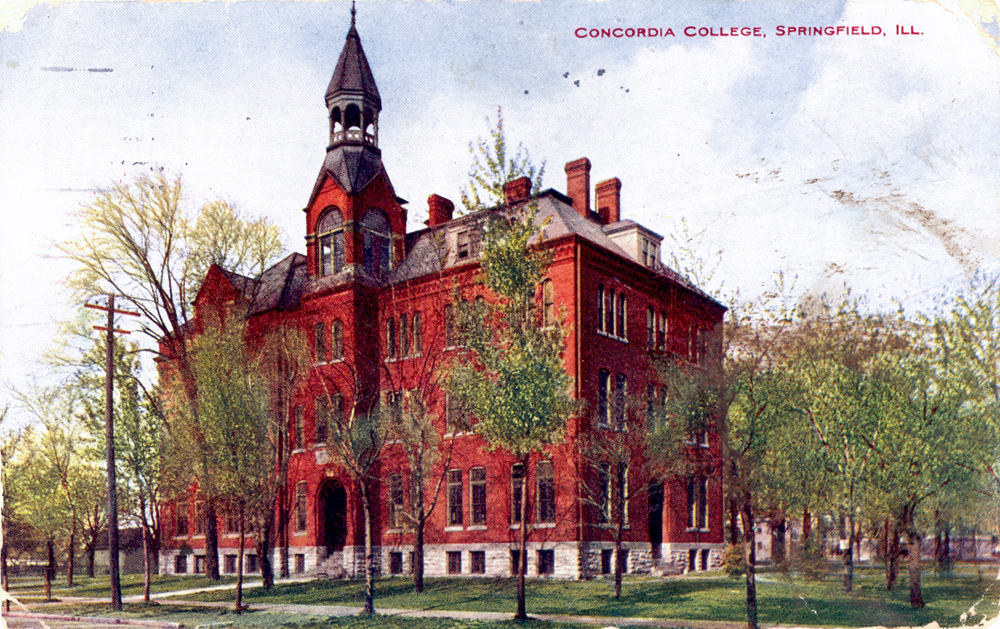
Classroom and dormitory building in Springfield, Illinois, that was dedicated on May 31, 1891

At that time there were no particular entrance requirements. It was not until 1918 that completion of eighth grade was required of prospective students, the same year that an additional year of instruction was added to the pre-seminary course of study. The additional courses made it possible for pastors to obtain teaching certificates in states where pastors were not automatically eligible to teach in parochial schools. However, even in the 1920s the pastors graduating from the seminary generally had, except for the pastoral training, only the equivalent of a high school education.

In view of the relatively low level of academic training provided by the seminary, resolutions to close the seminary were introduced in the 1932 and 1935 synodical conventions; the one in 1935 initially passed by a 266 to 265 vote, but was then reconsidered and defeated, 283 to 256. Nevertheless, the seminary began making changes: Greek was made a required course; new students had to have had at least two years of high school, and accreditation by the state of Illinois was sought.

Starting in 1941, all entering students had to be high school graduates, allowing the seminary to discontinue all high school classes. Academic requirements were further strengthened in subsequent years. Entrance requirements were again raised, first to completion of two years of college, and again to prefer college graduates. Expectations for the faculty were also increased with the aim that all professors would have doctoral degrees. The American Association of Theological Schools accepted the seminary as a member in the fall of 1968. The Bachelor of Divinity degree which the seminary had awarded its graduates became fully accredited, and was replaced by the Master of Divinity degree in 1973.

=== Return to Fort Wayne ===
The seminary remained in Springfield until the synod reorganized its system of pastoral training and merged the program of Concordia Senior College of Fort Wayne with Concordia College in Ann Arbor, Michigan. In 1976, the seminary returned to Fort Wayne, where it inherited the Senior College's award-winning campus, designed by Eero Saarinen.

=== Presidents ===
Concordia has had 17 presidents.

No.	Name	Term
1	Wilhelm Sihler	1846–1861
2	C. F. W. Walther	1861–1875
3	Friedrich August Crämer	1875–1891
4	Reinhold Pieper	1891–1914
5	Richard Daniel Biedermann	1914–1921
6	Henry Adam Klein	1922–1935
7	Henry B. Hemmeter	1936–1945
8	G. Christian Barth	1945–1952
9	Walter A. Baepler	1952–1958
10	George Beto	1959–1962
11	J. A. O. Preus II	1962–1969
12	Richard J. Schultz	1970–1974
13	Robert D. Preus	1974–1989 (Note: Retired by the Board of Regents)
–	Norbert H. Mueller (Note: Served as interim president)	1989–1992
–	Robert D. Preus (Note: Reinstated by Synodical Convention resolution, with Michael Stelmachowicz as CEO)	1992–1993
14	David G. Schmiel	1993–1995
15	Dean O. Wenthe	1996–2011
16	Lawrence R. Rast Jr.	2011–2024
17	Jon S. Bruss	2024–present

== Academics ==
Concordia Theological Seminary is divided into four departments: Exegetical Theology, Historical Theology, Pastoral Ministry and Mission, and Systematic Theology.

The seminary is theologically conservative, emphasizing study of the Bible and the Book of Concord. It is a liturgical community following the practice of praying the divine offices each day, including Matins, Vespers, and Compline, as well as celebrating the Lord's Supper each week.

== Notable alumni ==
- Dan Cloeter, Lutheran pastor and marathon runner
- Patrick Ferry, president of Concordia University Wisconsin from 1997 to 2021
- Daniel L. Gard, Deputy Chief of Chaplains for Reserve Matters of the United States Navy Chaplain Corps (2013–2019), president of Concordia University Chicago (2014–2019)
- Matthew Harrison, president of the LCMS (2010–present)
- Joel D. Heck, professor of theology at Concordia University Texas
- Scot Kerns, member of the Montana State Legislature
- Gerald B. Kieschnick, president of the LCMS (2001–2010)
- Donald K. Muchow, Chief of Chaplains of the United States Navy (1994–1997)
- Andrew Schulze, Lutheran pastor and civil rights activist
- Andrew Steinmann, professor of theology and Hebrew at Concordia University Chicago
- Gordon Winrod, Lutheran pastor, and later, a Christian Identity minister

== Publications ==
The seminary publishes a journal for professional theologians, a magazine for laity and for the seminary community, and books.

- Concordia Theological Quarterly, a continuation of The Springfielder, is a theological journal of the Lutheran Church–Missouri Synod, published for its ministerium by the faculty of the seminary. CTQ is published in January, April, July, and October, and is indexed by the ATLA Religion Database.
- For the Life of the World is the official magazine of Concordia Theological Seminary.
- Concordia Theological Seminary Press has published numerous books, including works by Martin Luther, Johann Gerhard, F. C. D. Wyneken, C. F. W. Walther, Walter A. Maier, and Robert Preus.
