= Lutheran Church – Missouri Synod =

Christian denomination in the United States

The Lutheran Church – Missouri Synod
- The LCMS logo (2020)
- Abbreviation: LCMS
- Classification: Protestant
- Orientation: Confessional Lutheran
- Polity: Synodical/modified congregational
- Structure: National synod, 35 middle level districts, and local congregations
- President: Matthew C. Harrison
- Altar and pulpit fellowship: American Association of Lutheran Churches; Evangelical Lutheran Church of Latvia
- Associations: International Lutheran Council
- Region: United States, especially in the Upper Midwest.
- Headquarters: Kirkwood, Missouri
- Founder: C. F. W. Walther
- Origin: April 26, 1847; Chicago, Illinois
- Separated from: German Landeskirchen
- Absorbed: Evangelical Lutheran Synod of Illinois and Other States (1880); Evangelical Lutheran Concordia Synod of Pennsylvania and Other States (1886); English Evangelical Lutheran Synod of Missouri and Other States (1911); Synodical Conference Negro Mission (1961); National Evangelical Lutheran Church (1964); Synod of Evangelical Lutheran Churches (1971)
- Separations: Orthodox Lutheran Conference (1951); Lutheran Churches of the Reformation (1964); Association of Evangelical Lutheran Churches (1976), Evangelical Lutheran Church of Brazil (1980); Evangelical Lutheran Church of Argentina (1986); Lutheran Church–Canada (1988)
- Congregations: 5,767
- Members: 1,674,315 baptized 1,328,392 confirmed (2024)
- Primary schools: 822
- Secondary schools: 99
- Tax status: 501(c)(3) organization
- Tertiary institutions: 2 seminaries, 6 colleges and universities
- Other names: German: Die Deutsche Evangelisch-Lutherische Synode von Missouri, Ohio und andern Staaten; German Evangelical Lutheran Synod of Missouri, Ohio, and Other States
- Publications: The Lutheran Witness; Reporter
- Official website: lcms.org

The Lutheran Church – Missouri Synod (LCMS), also known as the Missouri Synod, is a confessional Lutheran denomination in the United States. With almost 1.7 million members as of 2024, it is the second-largest Lutheran body in the United States, behind the Evangelical Lutheran Church in America (ELCA). In 2025, Pew Research Center estimated that 1.1 percent of US adults, approximately 2.9 million people, identified with the LCMS and evangelical Lutheranism in contrast with 2 percent, or approximately 5.2 million people, who identified with the ELCA and mainline Lutheranism. The LCMS was organized in 1847 at a meeting in Chicago as the German Evangelical Lutheran Synod of Missouri, Ohio, and Other States (German: Die Deutsche Evangelisch-Lutherische Synode von Missouri, Ohio und andern Staaten), a name which partially reflected the geographic locations of the founding congregations.

The LCMS has congregations in all 50 U.S. states and two Canadian provinces, but over half of its members are located in the Midwest. It is a member of the International Lutheran Council and is in altar and pulpit fellowship with most of that group's members. The LCMS is headquartered in Kirkwood, Missouri, a suburb west of St. Louis and is divided into 35 districts—33 of which are geographic and two (the English and the SELC) non-geographic. The incumbent president is Matthew C. Harrison, who took office on September 1, 2010.

== History ==
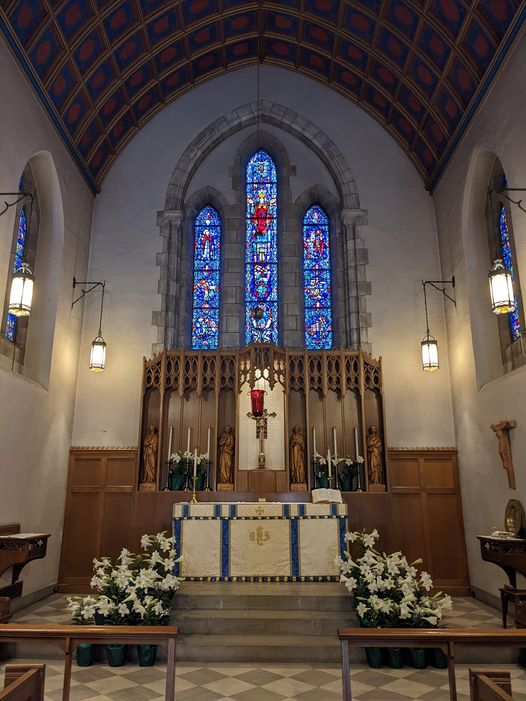
The altar of Our Saviour Lutheran Church in Baltimore, which belongs to the Lutheran Church – Missouri Synod

=== Origins ===
The Missouri Synod emerged from several communities of German Lutheran immigrants during the 1830s and 1840s. Isolated Germans in dense forests of the American frontier in Indiana, Ohio, and Michigan were brought together and ministered to by missionary F. C. D. Wyneken. A communal emigration from Saxony under Bishop Martin Stephan created a community in Perry County, Missouri, and in St. Louis. In Michigan and Ohio, missionaries sent by Wilhelm Löhe ministered to scattered congregations and founded German Lutheran communities in Frankenmuth, Michigan, and the Saginaw Valley of Michigan.

==== Saxon immigration ====
In the 19th-century German Kingdom of Saxony, Lutheran pastor Martin Stephan and many of his followers found themselves increasingly at odds with Rationalism, Christian ecumenism, and the prospect of a forced unionism of the Lutheran church with the Reformed church. In the neighboring Kingdom of Prussia, the Prussian Union of 1817 put in place what they considered non-Lutheran communion and baptismal doctrine and practice. In order to freely practice their Christian faith in accordance with the Lutheran confessions outlined in the Book of Concord, Stephan and between 600 and 700 other Saxon Lutherans left for the United States in November 1838.

Their ships arrived between December 31, 1838, and January 20, 1839, in New Orleans with one ship lost at sea. Most of the remaining immigrants left almost immediately, with the first group arriving in St. Louis on January 19, 1839. The final group, led by Stephan, remained in New Orleans for ten days, possibly to wait for the passengers of the lost ship Amalia. The immigrants ultimately settled in Perry County, Missouri, and in and around St. Louis. Stephan was initially the bishop of the new settlement, but he soon became embroiled in charges of corruption and sexual misconduct with members of the congregation and was expelled from the settlement, leaving C. F. W. Walther as the leader of the colony.

During that period, there was considerable debate within the settlement over the proper status of the church in the New World: whether it was a new church or whether it remained within the Lutheran hierarchy in Germany. Walther's view that they could consider themselves a new church prevailed.

==== Löhe missionaries ====
Beginning in 1841, the parish pastor in Neuendettelsau, Bavaria—Wilhelm Löhe—inspired by appeals for aid to the German immigrants in North America, began to solicit funds for missionary work among them. He also began training men to become pastors and teachers, sending his first two students—Adam Ernst and Georg Burger—to America on August 5, 1842. Löhe ultimately sent over 80 pastors and students of theology to America; these pastors founded and served congregations throughout Ohio, Michigan, and Indiana.

Löhe also led an early and largely abortive effort to send missionaries to convert the Native Americans. In 1844 and 1845, he solicited colonists to form a German Lutheran settlement in Michigan, with the thought that this settlement would also serve as the base for missionary activity among the Native Americans. The colonists left Germany on April 20, 1845, under the leadership of Pastor August Crämer, and arrived in Saginaw County, Michigan, in August of that year. They founded several villages—Frankenmuth, Frankenlust, Frankentrost, and Frankenhilf (now known as Richville)—and worked to convert the Native Americans. They had limited success, however, and the villages became nearly exclusively German settlements within a few years.

In addition to sending pastors, theological students, and colonists to America, Löhe played an instrumental role in the formation of Concordia Theological Seminary in Fort Wayne, Indiana, raising funds for the new institution and sending eleven theological students and a professor from Germany to help found it. The seminary's first president, Wilhelm Sihler, had also been sent by Löhe to America several years before.

Due to Löhe's zeal and labors, LCMS' first president, C. F. W. Walther, said of him, "Next to God, it is Pastor Loehe to whom our Synod is indebted for its happy beginning and rapid growth in which it rejoices; it may well honor him as its spiritual father. It would fill the pages of an entire book to recount even briefly what for many years this man, with tireless zeal in the noblest unselfish spirit, has done for our Lutheran Church and our Synod in particular."

=== Founding and early years ===
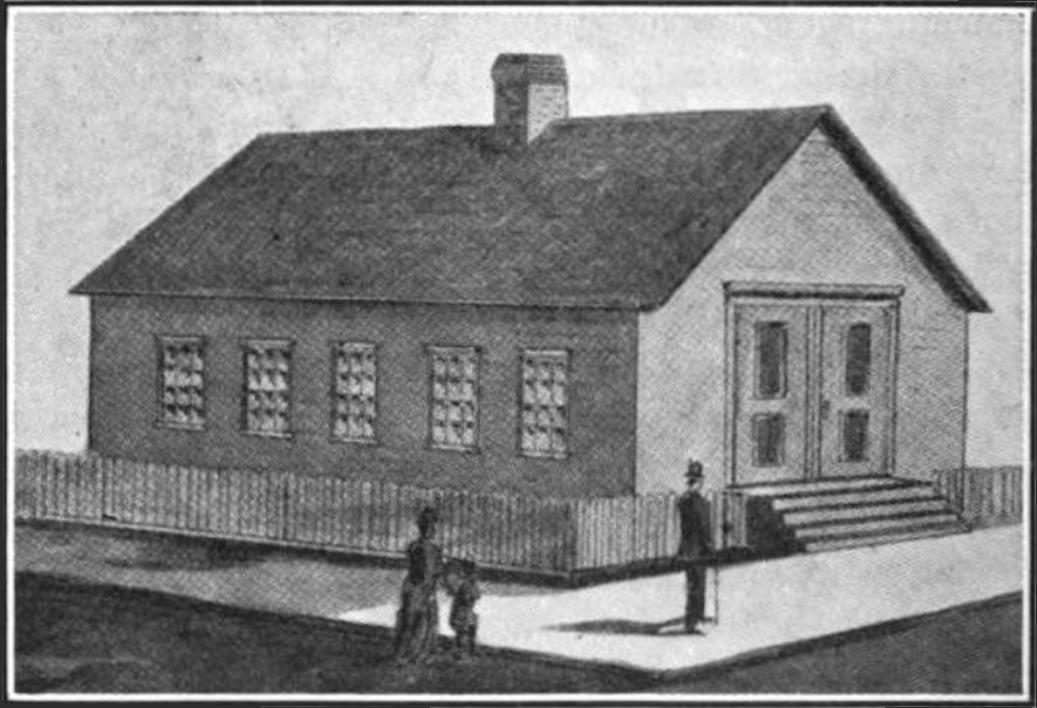
St. Paul's in Chicago, where the first meeting of the Missouri Synod was held

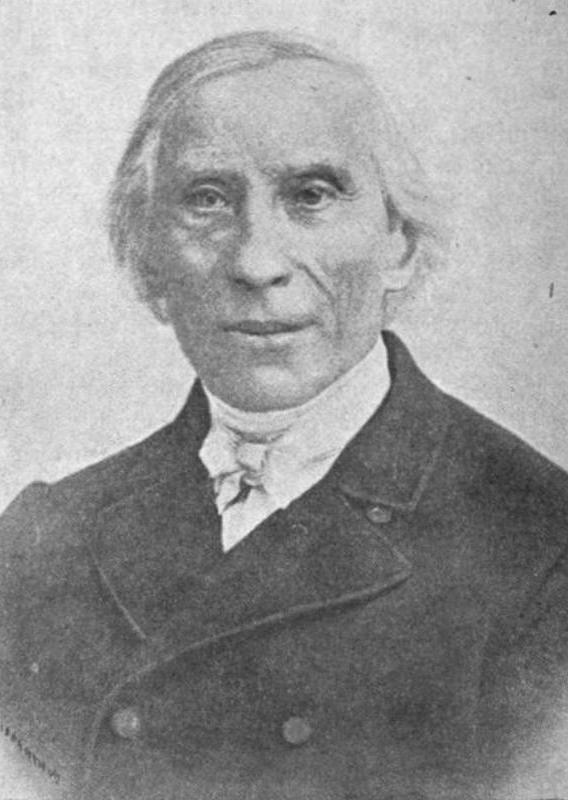
Old Lutheran free church leader Friedrich August Brünn sent about 235 men to serve as pastors in the Missouri Synod.

In 1844 and 1845, these two groups (the Saxons and the Löhe men) as well as Wyneken and one of his assistants began discussing the possibility of forming a new, confessional Lutheran church body. As a result of the discussions, the Löhe missionaries and Wyneken and his assistant (F. W. Husmann) decided to leave their synods. Planning meetings were held in St. Louis in May 1846 and in Fort Wayne, Indiana, in July 1846. On April 26, 1847, twelve pastors representing fourteen German Lutheran congregations met in Chicago and officially founded the German Evangelical Lutheran Synod of Missouri, Ohio and Other States. Walther became the fledgling denomination's first president.

The synod was quickly noted for its conservatism and self-professed orthodoxy. The synod's constitution required all members (both pastors and congregations) to pledge fealty to the entire Book of Concord, to reject unionism and syncretism of every kind, to use only doctrinally pure books in both church and school, and to provide for the Christian education of their children. Among other things, these requirements meant that altar and pulpit fellowship was usually restricted to those Lutheran congregations and synods who were in complete doctrinal agreement with the Missouri Synod.

The LCMS' conservatism soon drew it into conflict with other Lutheran synods, the majority of which were then experimenting with so-called "American Lutheranism". In addition, the LCMS also quickly became embroiled in a dispute with the Buffalo Synod and its leader, Johannes Andreas August Grabau, over the proper understanding of the church and the ministry. Within a few years, this conflict led to a separation between the Missouri Synod and Löhe, as Löhe's views were close to those of Grabau.

Despite these conflicts, the Missouri Synod experienced fairly rapid growth in its early years, leading to the subdivision of the synod into four district synods (Central, Eastern, Northern, and Western) in 1854. This growth was due largely to the synod's efforts, under the leadership of its second president, F. C. D. Wyneken, to care for German immigrants, help them find a home among other Germans, build churches and parochial schools, and train pastors and teachers. The synod continued these outreach efforts throughout the 19th century, becoming the largest Lutheran church body in the United States by 1888. By the synod's fiftieth anniversary in 1897, it had grown to 687,000 members.

=== Synodical Conference ===
Between 1856 and 1859, the Missouri Synod hosted a series of four free conferences in order to explore the possibility of entering into fellowship agreements with other conservative Lutheran synods. As a result of these conferences, the LCMS entered into fellowship with the Norwegian Synod in 1857. In 1872, these two synods joined the Wisconsin, Ohio, Minnesota, and Illinois Synods, which were also conservative Lutheran bodies, to form the Evangelical Lutheran Synodical Conference of North America.

In 1876, the constituent synods of the Synodical Conference considered a plan to reorganize into a single unified church body with a single seminary. Some preliminary moves were made in this direction (including the 1880 absorption of the Illinois Synod into the LCMS' Illinois District), but opposition from some synods postponed the complete implementation of this plan, and the Predestinarian Controversy of the 1880s scuttled the plan entirely. As a result of the controversy, several pastors and congregations withdrew from the Ohio Synod to form the Concordia Synod; this synod merged with the LCMS in 1886.

Efforts were made in the 1920s to establish fellowship with the Ohio, Iowa, and Buffalo synods. Representatives from the synods formulated the Chicago Theses as a for agreement, but the 1929 LCMS synodical convention did not accept them and instead created a committee that, in 1932, produced the Brief Statement of the Doctrinal Position of the Missouri Synod. After the Ohio, Iowa, and Buffalo synods merged in 1930 to form the first American Lutheran Church (ALC), representatives from the ALC and the LCMS came to agreement on the Brief Statement and the ALC's Declaration in 1938, but again no further action was taken.

=== English transition ===
For the first thirty years of its existence, the Missouri Synod focused almost exclusively on meeting the spiritual needs of German-speaking Lutherans, leaving work among English-speaking Lutherans to other synods, particularly the Tennessee and Ohio synods. In 1872, members of the Tennessee Synod invited representatives from the Missouri, Holston, and Norwegian synods to discuss the promotion of English work among the more "Americanized" Lutherans, resulting in the organization of the "English Evangelical Lutheran Conference of Missouri." This conference was reorganized in 1888 as an independent church body, the English Evangelical Lutheran Synod of Missouri and Other States, which subsequently merged into the LCMS as its English District in 1911. In its first twenty years, the English Synod became responsible for two colleges, organized dozens of congregations and parochial schools, took over the publication of The Lutheran Witness (an English-language newspaper published by LCMS pastors in Cleveland, Ohio), and published several hymnals and other books.

English work became more widespread in the LCMS during the first two decades of the twentieth century, with older members of the synod continuing to speak primarily German and younger members increasingly switching to English. As one scholar has explained, "The overwhelming evidence from internal documents of these [Missouri Synod] churches, and particularly their schools ... indicates that the German-American school was a bilingual one much (perhaps a whole generation or more) earlier than 1917, and that the majority of the pupils may have been English-dominant bilinguals from the early 1880s on." The anti-German sentiment during the wars hastened the "Americanization" of the church and caused many churches to add English services and in some cases, drop German services entirely. During the years of language transition, the synod's membership continued to grow, until by 1947, the synod had grown to over 1.5 million members.

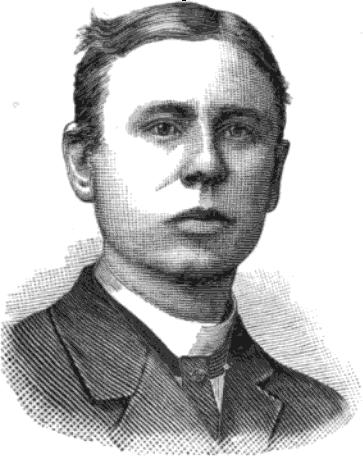
Franz Pieper, June 27, 1852 – June 3, 1931

During this time, the LCMS expanded its missionary efforts through the creation of its own radio station—KFUO (AM) (1924)—and its own international radio program—The Lutheran Hour (1930). Several years later, the synod began broadcasting its own TV drama—This Is the Life (1952).

=== Post-WWII ===
In 1945, a group of 44 leaders and theologians in the synod issued a statement criticizing the synod's approach toward other Lutheran bodies. The document known as "A Statement of the Forty-four" was signed by Theodore Graebner and four other professors at Concordia Seminary and by H. B. Hemmeter, who had recently retired as president of Concordia Theological Seminary, among others. The statement provoked immediate response from others in the synod.

In 1947, its centennial year, the church body shortened its name from "The Evangelical Lutheran Synod of Missouri, Ohio, and other States" to the present one, "The Lutheran Church – Missouri Synod". The 1947 convention also directed the Committee on Doctrinal Unity to meet with the Fellowship Commission of the ALC to develop a set of doctrinal theses. The first meeting was on May 17, 1948, and, after additional meetings, the Common Confession, Part I, was approved by the two committees on December 5–6, 1949. Both the ALC and the LCMS accepted the document in 1950. The two committees continued meeting to develop Part II of the Common Confession covering additional topics. The ALC accepted Part II in 1954. The 1956 convention of the LCMS recognized the Common Confession as one document in two parts that is a statement "in harmony with the Sacred Scriptures and the Lutheran Confessions"; however, it also declared that the document should not be "regarded or employed as a functioning basic document toward the establishment of altar and pulpit fellowship with other church bodies".

The renewed interest in the ALC led a number of parties to fear that the synod was losing its doctrinal basis. In 1951, a small group of pastors and congregations left the synod to form the Orthodox Lutheran Conference, but the main impetus for the move was not church fellowship, but the question of whether breaking an engagement (in the modern sense) is the same as the breaking of a betrothal (historically) and therefore a sin, as those leaving the synod contended. Concerns about the LCMS becoming more open to less conservative Lutheran bodies caused problems in the Synodical Conference. In 1955, the Evangelical Lutheran Synod (ELS) broke fellowship with the LCMS, and in 1957, the WELS publicly admonished the LCMS, and, in 1961, it finally broke fellowship with the LCMS. Both the ELS and the WELS withdrew from the Synodical Conference in 1963, leaving only the LCMS and the Synod of Evangelical Lutheran Churches (SELC), an historically Slovak-American church, as members. In 1971, the SELC merged with the LCMS, forming the SELC District. The National Evangelical Lutheran Church, an historically Finnish-American Lutheran church, had already merged with the LCMS on January 1, 1964.

When the 1959 synodical convention did not take any action against the liberal movement, a number of pastors and laymen met in a State of the Church Conference at Trinity Lutheran Church in New Haven, Missouri, in which that church's pastor, Herman Otten, presented a book of documentation of the various controversies that had arisen in the LCMS since 1950 and before. Several additional conferences were held, with the one in Milwaukee on May 15–16, 1961, attracting over 400 people. Plans were made at that conference for actions they wanted the 1962 synodical convention to take. The failure of the convention to do so led a dozen or so congregations and pastors to form the Lutheran Churches of the Reformation on April 28–29, 1964, at Emmaus Lutheran Church in Chicago. However, many of those opposed to the direction of the LCMS decided to remain in the synod, hoping to influence its direction.

In 1967, the LCMS agreed with the second American Lutheran Church (the successor to the first ALC) and the Lutheran Church in America (LCA) to form the Lutheran Council in the United States of America (LCUSA), but only on the assurance that a program of theological discussion would be implemented. With the election of J. A. O. Preus II as its president over the incumbent, Oliver Harms, in 1969, the LCMS began a sharp turn towards a more conservative direction. A dispute over the use of the historical-critical method for Biblical interpretation led to the suspension of John Tietjen as president of Concordia Seminary. In response, many of the faculty and students left the seminary and formed Seminex (Concordia Seminary in Exile), which took up residence at the nearby Eden Theological Seminary in suburban St. Louis.

The same convention which elected Preus as president also established altar and pulpit fellowship with the ALC. This was seen by many as a gesture toward Harms, who had supported the declaration of fellowship. Eight years later, the 1977 convention declared a state of "fellowship in protest" as the ALC exhibited closer ties to the more liberal LCA. The 1981 convention terminated the fellowship agreement. A number of pastors and others did not think that Preus's method of dealing with false doctrine would be successful. On November 1–2, 1971, members of the Conference for Authentic Lutheranism in California and the Free Association for Authentic Lutheranism in the Midwest met in Libertyville, Illinois, north of Chicago, to form a new church body, the Federation for Authentic Lutheranism (FAL). They expected 50 to 60 congregations to join, but in the end, only six did as the conservative wing continued to gain strength in the LCMS. FAL declared fellowship with the WELS in 1973, but did not survive very long thereafter.

In 1976, about 250 of the congregations supporting Seminex left the LCMS to form the Association of Evangelical Lutheran Churches (AELC). The LCMS restricted its participation with LCUSA shortly after the AELC schism and announced that it would not participate in any merger discussions. In 1988, the AELC, ALC, and LCA merged to form the Evangelical Lutheran Church in America, and LCUSA was dissolved.

== Foreign missions ==
=== Brazil ===
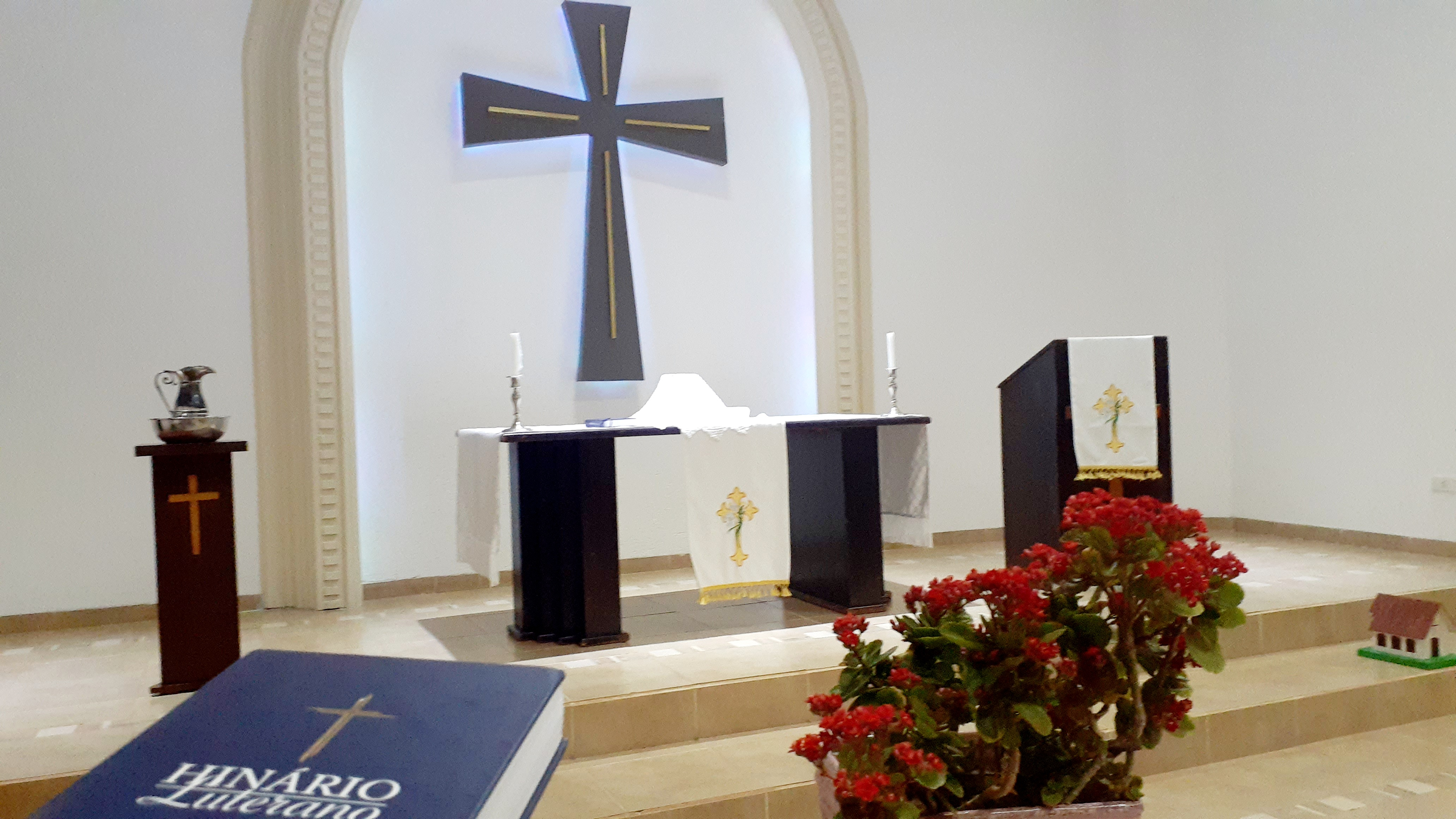
IELB Holy Trinity Church in Naviraí, Mato Grosso do Sul, Brazil

In 1900, the LCMS began sending missionaries to Brazil to minister to German-speaking immigrants in that country, and in 1904 created the Brazil District for the administration of the resulting congregations. Work was begun in Argentina in 1905 as part of the Brazil District. A separate Argentina District was established in 1926/1927. Both districts became independent church bodies that retain close relationships with the LCMS: the Evangelical Lutheran Church of Brazil in 1980, and the Evangelical Lutheran Church of Argentina in 1988.

=== Canada ===
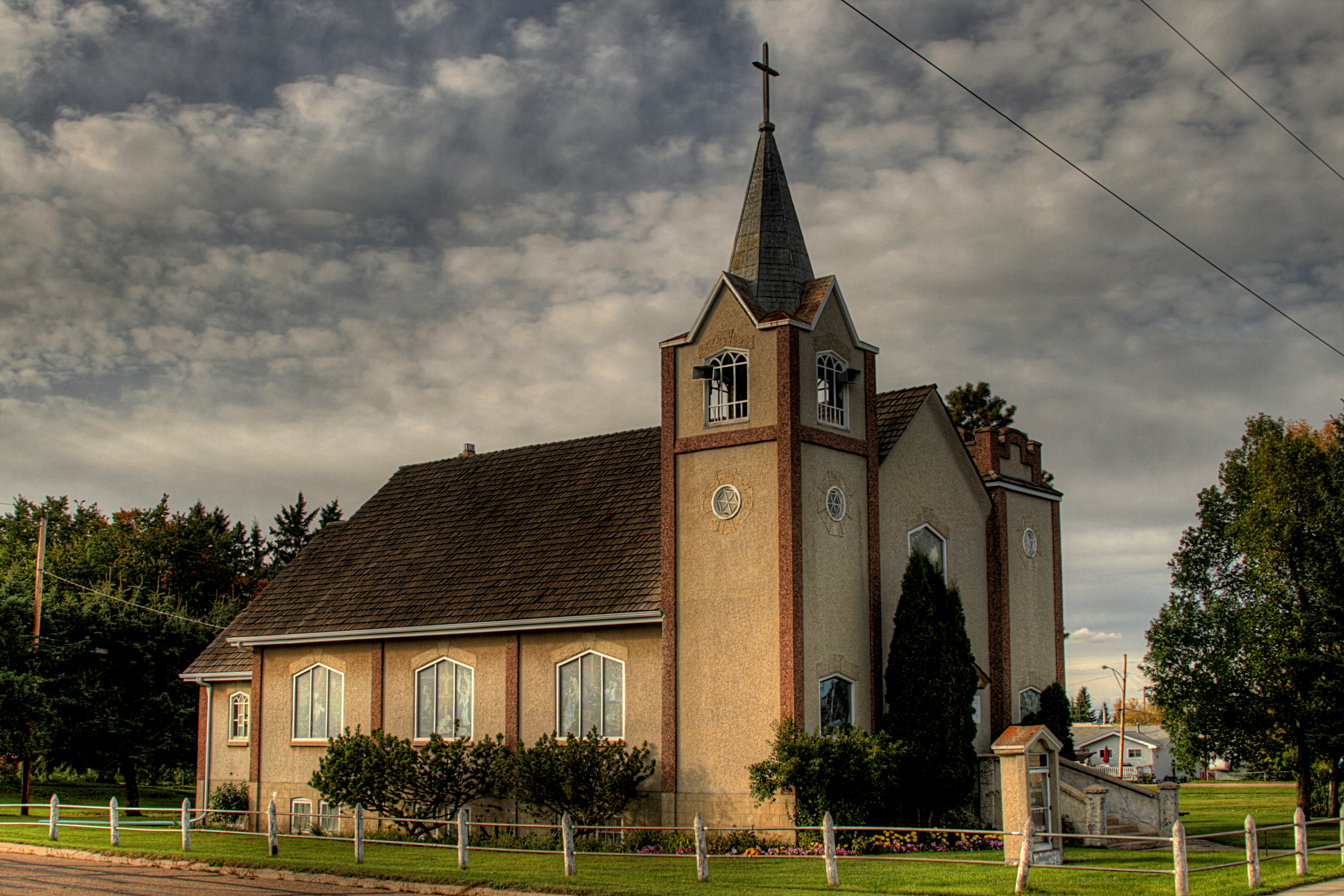
LCC Bethlehem Lutheran Church, Bruderheim, Alberta

The LCMS had an extensive roster of congregations in Canada until 1988, when the Canadian component became a separate and autonomous organization, Lutheran Church – Canada. However, this was an administrative, not theological division, and the two groups still share close ties and are in full communion with one another. A small number of congregations in Ontario and Quebec that are in the non-geographical English and SELC districts remain within the LCMS.

=== China ===
LCMS missionary Edward Arnd arrived in Hankou in 1913. He began learning Mandarin after his arrival and preached his first Chinese sermon at Shekou. The second missionary, Erhardt Riedel, arrived in Hankou in 1916. In 1917, the LCMS began providing financial and personnel support to the mission in China. In 1920, the LCMS founded the Evangelical Lutheran Mission in China. The church was renamed the Evangelical Lutheran Church in 1923 to distinguish itself from the Lutheran Church of China. During the Second Sino-Japanese War, some missionaries remained in Mainland China while others began to relocate to the British colony of Hong Kong.

=== Hong Kong ===
Following the Chinese Civil War, LCMS missionaries Wilbert Holt, Gertrude A. Simon, Martha Boss, and Lorraine Behling relocated from China to Hong Kong. From 1950 to 1954, the LCMS missionaries founded the Concordia Bible Institute to provide theological training to people in Hong Kong. In 1977, the Lutheran Church-Hong Kong Synod (LCHKS) was established and officially became an LCMS partner church. In March 2018, the Asian headquarter of LCMS International Mission moved from Hong Kong to Taiwan, and LCMS sold three properties it owned and had used for missionary housing and office space for the mission headquarters. The LCHKS contends that the properties were and should be used by the gospel ministry of LCHKS. The move caused the LCHKS to suspend the partnership with LCMS.

== Beliefs ==
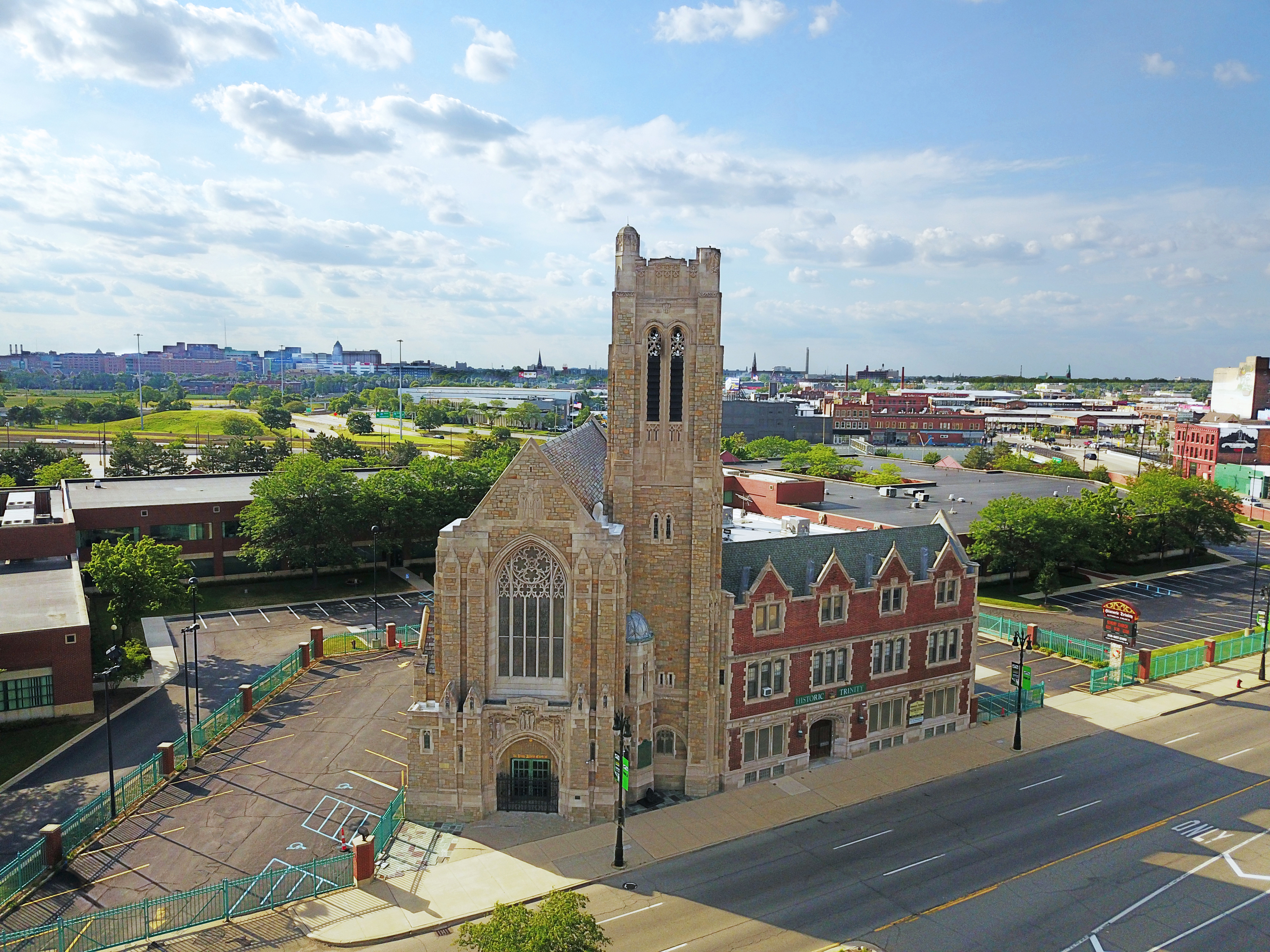
Trinity Lutheran Church in Detroit, Michigan

=== Doctrinal sources ===
One of the signature teachings of the Lutheran Reformation is sola scriptura—"Scripture alone." The LCMS believes that the Bible is the only standard by which church teachings can be judged, and holds that Scripture is best explained and interpreted by the Book of Concord—a series of confessions of faith adopted by Lutherans in the 16th century. LCMS pastors and congregations agree to teach in harmony with the Book of Concord because they believe that it teaches and faithfully explains the Word of God, not based on its own authority alone. Since the LCMS is a confessional church body, its ordained and commissioned ministers of religion are sworn by their oaths of ordination or installation, or both, to interpret the Sacred Scriptures according to the Book of Concord. Its ordained and commissioned ministers of religion are asked to honor and uphold other official teachings of the synod, meaning "to abide by, act, and teach in accordance with," but are not sworn to believe, confess and teach them as correct interpretations of the Sacred Scriptures. The LCMS also teaches biblical inerrancy, the teaching that the Bible is inspired by God and is without error. For this reason, they reject much of modern liberal scholarship. The Brief Statement of the Doctrinal Position of the Missouri Synod, written by Franz August Otto Pieper, was adopted by the synodical convention in 1932 as a summary of the major beliefs of the LCMS.

==== Salvation ====
The LCMS believes that justification comes from God "by divine grace alone, through faith alone, on account of Christ alone." It teaches that Jesus is the focus of the entire Bible and that faith in him alone is the way to eternal salvation. The synod rejects any attempt to attribute salvation to anything other than Christ's death and resurrection.

==== Means of grace ====
The synod teaches that the Word of God, both written and preached, and the Sacraments are means of grace through which the Holy Spirit gives the gift of God's grace, creates faith in the hearts of individuals, forgives sins for the sake of Christ's death on the cross, and grants eternal life and salvation. Many Missouri Synod Lutherans define a sacrament as an action instituted by Jesus that combines a promise in God's Word with a physical element, although the synod holds no official definition for sacrament. This means that some may disagree on the number of sacraments. All agree that Baptism and Communion are sacraments. Confession and absolution is called a sacrament in the Apology of the Augsburg Confession and so is also considered by many Lutherans to be a sacrament, because it was instituted by Christ and has His promise of grace, even though it is not tied to a physical element. Regular private confession to a pastor is encouraged, with the seal of the confessional ensuring that pastors "never reveal the sins confessed to them".

Unlike Reformed (Calvinist) Christians, Lutherans agree that the means of grace are resistible; this belief is based on numerous biblical references as discussed in the Book of Concord.

==== Sacramental Union and the Eucharist ====
Regarding the Eucharist, the LCMS rejects both the Roman Catholic doctrine of transubstantiation and the Reformed teaching that the true body and blood of Christ are not consumed with the consecrated bread and wine in the Eucharist. Rather, it believes in the doctrine of the sacramental union, Real Presence, that the Body and Blood of Christ are truly present "in, with, and under" the elements of bread and wine. Or, as the Smalcald Articles express this mystery: "Of the Sacrament of the Altar, we hold that the bread and wine in the Supper are Christ's true body and blood." This is erroneously known as the doctrine of consubstantiation, and the term is rejected by Lutherans—being explicitly rejected by the LCMS as an attempt to define the holy mystery of Christ's presence.

==== Eschatology ====
The LCMS flatly rejects millennialism and considers itself amillennialist. This means that it believes there will be no literal 1000-year visible earthly kingdom of Jesus, a view termed as "realized millennialism" in which the "thousand years" of Rev 20:1–10 is taken figuratively as a reference to the time of Christ's reign as king from the day of his ascension. Hence, the millennium is a present reality (Christ's heavenly reign), not a future hope for a rule of Christ on earth after his return (the parousia) (cf. Mt 13:41–42; Mt 28:18; Eph 2:6; Col 3:1–3).

==== Law and Gospel ====
The LCMS believes that the Holy Scriptures contain two crucial teachings—Law and Gospel. The Law is all those demands in the Bible which must be obeyed in order to gain salvation. However, because all people are sinners, it is impossible for people to completely obey the Law. Therefore, the Law implies an inevitable consequence of God's wrath, judgment, and damnation. The Gospel, on the other hand, is the promise of free salvation from God to sinners. The Law condemns; the Gospel saves. Both the Law and the Gospel are gifts from God; both are necessary. The function of the law is to show people their sinful nature and drive them to the Gospel, in which the forgiveness of sin is promised for the sake of the death and resurrection of Jesus Christ.

The LCMS holds that the Old Testament and the New Testament each contain both Law and Gospel. The Old Testament, therefore, is valuable to Christians. Its teachings point forward in time to the Cross of Christ in the same way that the New Testament points backward in time to the Cross. That Lutheran doctrine is summarized by C. F. W. Walther in The Proper Distinction Between Law and Gospel.

=== Other doctrine ===
The LCMS holds that all "false teachers who teach contrary to Christ's Word are opponents of Christ" and, insofar as they do so, are anti-Christ. The LCMS does not teach, nor has it ever taught, that any individual pope as a person is to be identified with the Antichrist. However, to the extent that the papacy continues to claim as official dogma the canons and decrees of the Council of Trent, the LCMS position is that the office of the papacy is the Antichrist.

The LCMS officially supports literal creationism but does not have an official position on the precise age of the Earth. An official publication of the synod, the Brief Statement of 1932, states under the heading "Of Creation": "We teach that God has created heaven and earth, and that in the manner and in the space of time recorded in the Holy Scriptures, especially Gen. 1 and 2, namely, by His almighty creative word, and in six days." According to a 2004 LCMS synodical resolution, all LCMS churches and educational institutions—including preschool through 12th grade, universities, and seminaries—are "to teach creation from the Biblical perspective." The LCMS website says that an individual's personal views regarding creation do not disqualify a person from being a member of the LCMS.

The LCMS believes that the teachings of Freemasonry are in direct conflict with the Gospel and instructs its pastors and laypeople to avoid membership or participation in it.

The LCMS practices infant baptism. It subscribes to the statement of faith found in the Apostles' Creed, the Ten Commandments, and the Lord's Prayer being applicable to daily life. The doctrines are emphasized in Luther's Small Catechism.

== Practices ==
=== Worship and music ===
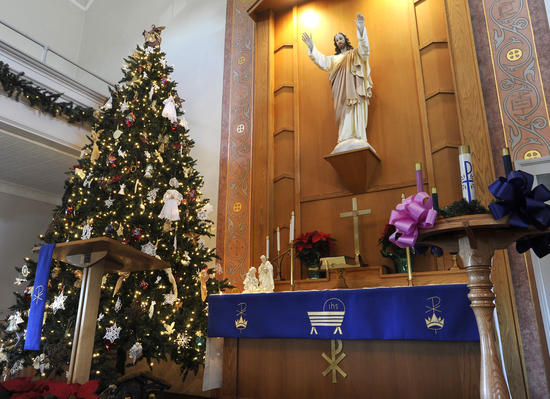
The altar of Grace Lutheran Church in Uniontown, Missouri

The original constitution of the LCMS stated that one of its purposes is to strive toward uniformity in practice, while more recent changes to those documents also encourage responsible and doctrinally sound diversity. The synod requires that hymns, songs, liturgies, and practices be in harmony with the Bible and Book of Concord. Worship in LCMS congregations is generally thought of as orthodox and liturgical, utilizing a printed order of service and hymnal, and is typically accompanied by a pipe organ or piano. The contents of LCMS hymnals from the past, such as The Lutheran Hymnal and Lutheran Worship, and those of its newest hymnal, Lutheran Service Book, highlight the synod's unwavering stance towards more traditional styles of hymnody and liturgy. More traditional LCMS Lutherans point to the Lutheran Confessions in their defense of liturgical worship.

Towards the later parts of the twentieth century and up until present day, some congregations have adopted a more progressive style of worship, employing different styles such as contemporary Christian music with guitars and praise bands and often project song lyrics onto screens instead of using hymnals. While this shift in style challenges the traditionalism of hymnody that the LCMS holds strongly, the LCMS has released a statement on worship stating that, "The best of musical traditions, both ancient and modern, are embraced by the Lutheran church in its worship, with an emphasis on congregational singing, reinforced by the choir."

=== Reception of communion ===
The LCMS endorses the doctrine of close or closed communion—the policy of sharing the Eucharist ordinarily only with those who are baptized and confirmed members of one of the congregations of the LCMS or of a congregation of one of its sister churches with which it has formally declared altar and pulpit fellowship (i.e., agreement in all articles of doctrine). LCMS congregations implement closed communion in various ways, requiring conformity to official doctrine in various degrees. Usually, visitors are asked to speak with the pastor before coming to that congregation's altar for the first time. Most congregations invite those uneducated on the subject of the Eucharist to join in the fellowship and receive a blessing instead of the body and blood of Christ.

=== Ordination ===
Ordination is seen as a public ceremony of recognition that a man has received and accepted a divine call, and hence is considered to be in the office of the Holy Ministry. The Treatise on the Power and Primacy of the Pope agrees that "ordination was nothing else than such a ratification" of local elections by the people. The LCMS does not believe that the rite of ordination, though an accepted and praiseworthy ceremony, is divinely mandated or an extension of an episcopal form of apostolic succession but sees the office grounded in the Word and Sacrament ministry of the Gospel, arguing that Scripture makes no distinction between a presbyter (priest) and a bishop (see Treatise on the Power and Primacy of the Pope, paragraphs 63,64, citing St. Jerome). The Augsburg Confession (Article XIV) holds that no one is to preach, teach, or administer the sacraments without a regular call.

LCMS pastors are generally required to have a four-year bachelor's degree (in any discipline), as well as a four-year Master of Divinity degree, which is usually obtained from one of these institutions: Concordia Seminary in St. Louis or the Concordia Theological Seminary in Fort Wayne, Indiana, or at the two seminaries run by the Lutheran Church – Canada. Candidates may earn their Master of Divinity degree at other seminaries but may then be required to take colloquy classes at either St. Louis or Ft. Wayne. Seminary training includes classwork in historical theology, Biblical languages (Biblical Greek and Hebrew), practical application (education, preaching, and mission), and doctrine (the basic teachings and beliefs of the synod).

=== Role of women in the church ===
The LCMS teaches that the ordination of women as clergy is contrary to scripture. The issue of women's roles in the church body has continued to be a subject of debate within the synod. During the Cooperative Clergy Study Project in 2000, 10% out of 652 LCMS pastors surveyed stated that all clergy positions should be open to women, while 82% disagreed. Congregations were permitted to enact female suffrage within LCMS congregations in 1969, and it was affirmed at the synod's 2004 convention that women may also "serve in humanly established offices" as long as those offices do not include any of the "distinctive functions of the pastoral office". Thus in some congregations of the LCMS, women now serve as congregation president or chairperson, etc. This is the cause of contention within the LCMS, with some congregations utilizing women in public worship to read lessons and assist in the distribution of holy communion. Other traditional Lutherans reject such practices as unbiblical, with a minority of congregations continuing the historic practice of male suffrage, similar to the Wisconsin Synod.

=== Interfaith services ===
The LCMS bars its clergy from worshiping with other faiths, holding "that church fellowship or merger between church bodies in doctrinal disagreement with one another is not in keeping with what the Bible teaches about church fellowship." In practice of this, a Connecticut LCMS pastor was asked to apologize by the president of the denomination, and did so, for participating in an interfaith prayer vigil for the 26 children and adults killed at a Newtown elementary school, and an LCMS pastor in New York was suspended for praying at an interfaith vigil in 2001, 12 days after the September 11 attacks.

=== LCMS National Youth Gathering ===
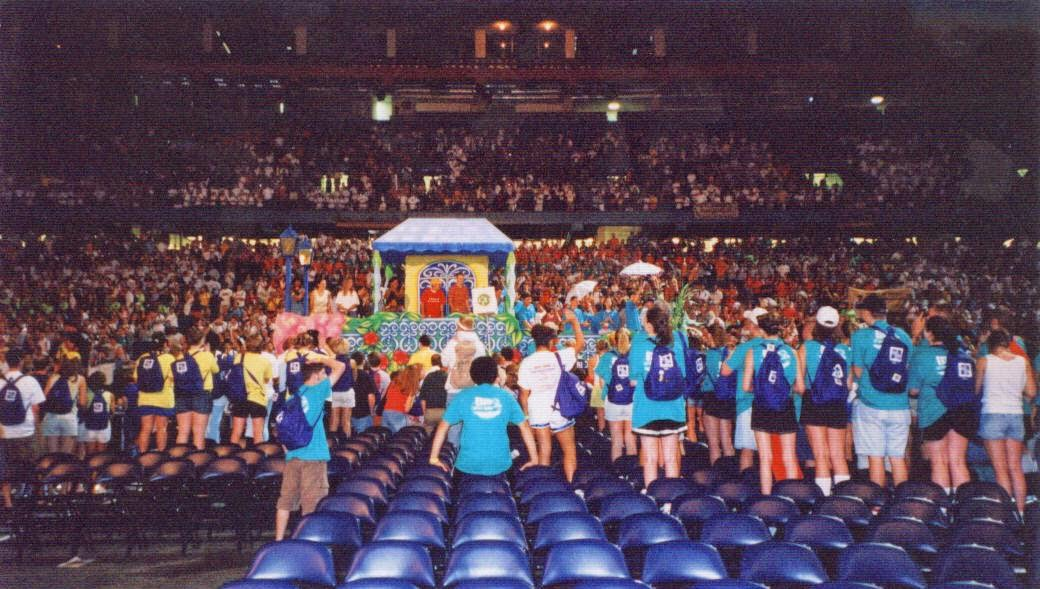
National Lutheran Youth Gathering in New Orleans, Louisiana, 2001

The National Youth Gathering is held every three years. The most recent gathering took place July 19–23, 2025, in New Orleans with the theme of "Endure" (Hebrews 12: 1-3) and was held at Morial Convention Center and Caesars Superdome. The city prepared to welcome over 20,000 participants. Notable speakers included Bethany Hamilton, Lutheran rapper Flame, Deaconess Danelle Putnam Schumann, and Rev. Dr. Michael Zeigler. The previous gathering took place July 9–13, 2022, in Houston with a theme of "In All Things." The 2019 gathering was held in Minneapolis, Minnesota, with a theme of "Real. Present. God". The theme for the 2016 gathering in New Orleans was "In Christ Alone". The previous gathering took place in 2013 in San Antonio, Texas, on July 1–5, 2013, and was based on the theme, "Live Love(d)". The 2010 gathering in New Orleans was based on the theme "We Believe". In both 2007 and 2004, The LCMS National Youth Gatherings were held at the Orange County Convention Center in Orlando, Florida. The gathering's theme in 2007 was "Chosen." The gathering in 2007 was originally planned to be held in New Orleans, but due to Hurricane Katrina the location was changed to Orlando. About 25,000 youth attend each gathering. Many Christian bands and artists perform at the gatherings.

The next LCMS Youth Gathering will be July 3–7, 2028, in San Antonio, Texas.

== Church structure ==
Official seal of The Lutheran Church – Missouri Synod

The LCMS has a synodical polity, which can be described as modified congregational polity with episcopal polity elements. It is organized into 35 districts, each of which has a president who oversees the congregations in his district, akin to the role of bishop used in other church traditions. However, resolutions passed by the synod and the respective districts are not binding on a congregation if they are not according to Scripture or are inexpedient for a congregation. That is somewhat different from some other Lutheran bodies which have maintained complete episcopal polity; however, this is not a point of doctrine, as the LCMS is in fellowship with some Lutheran church bodies in Europe and elsewhere that have an episcopal structure.

The LCMS is formally composed of two types of members: self-governing local congregations that qualify for membership by mutual agreement to adhere to stated principles, and clergymen who qualify by similar means. Congregations hold legal title to their church buildings and other property, and call (hire) and dismiss their own clergy. It allows the congregations to work together on projects too large for even a local consortium of congregations to accomplish, such as foreign mission work.

=== Synod ===
The LCMS as a whole is led by an ordained synodical president, currently Matthew C. Harrison. The president is chosen at a synodical convention, a gathering of the two membership groups (clergymen and lay representatives from the member congregations). The convention is held every three years; discussions of doctrine and policy take place at these events, and elections are held to fill various synod positions. The latest LCMS convention took place in 2026 in Phoenix, Arizona. Local conventions within each circuit and district are held in the intervening years.

==== Presidents ====
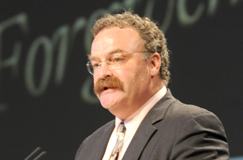
Matthew C. Harrison is the current president of the LCMS.

- 1847–1850 Carl Ferdinand Wilhelm Walther
- 1850–1864 Friedrich Conrad Dietrich Wyneken
- 1864–1878 Carl Ferdinand Wilhelm Walther
- 1878–1899 Heinrich Christian Schwan
- 1899–1911 Franz August Otto Pieper
- 1911–1935 Friedrich Pfotenhauer
- 1935–1962 John William Behnken
- 1962–1969 Oliver Raymond Harms
- 1969–1981 Jacob A. O. Preus II
- 1981–1992 Ralph Arthur Bohlmann
- 1992–2001 Alvin L. Barry
- 2001–2001 Robert T. Kuhn
- 2001–2010 Gerald B. Kieschnick
- 2010–present Matthew C. Harrison

=== Districts ===
The entire synod is divided into 35 districts. Of these, 33 have jurisdiction over specific geographic areas. The other two, the English and the SELC, are non-geographic and were formed when the English Missouri Synod and the Slovak Synod, respectively, merged with the formerly German-speaking Missouri Synod. Each district is led by an elected district president, who must be an ordained clergyman. Most district presidencies are full-time positions, but there are a few exceptions in which the district president also serves as a parish pastor. The districts are subdivided into circuits, each of which is led by a circuit visitor, who is an ordained pastor from one of the member congregations. Districts are analogous to dioceses in other Christian communities.

=== Congregations ===
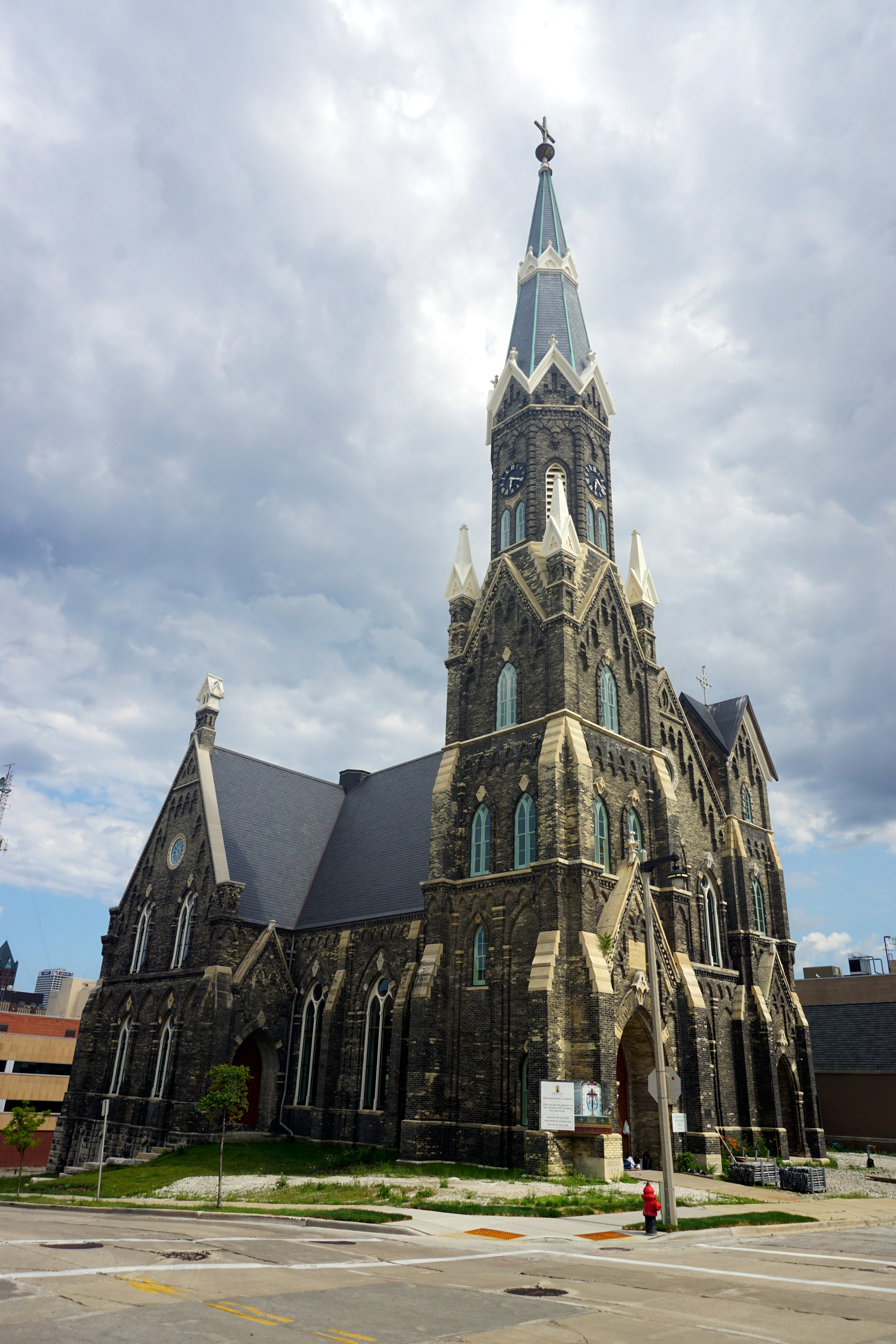
Trinity Evangelical Lutheran Church in Milwaukee, Wisconsin

Most congregations are served by full-time clergy. Some congregations, usually in rural areas, are served by ordained bi-vocational ministers (worker-priests) who maintain secular employment for sustenance and receive a small stipend or none at all.

== Organizations ==
=== Educational institutions ===
In addition to its two seminaries, the LCMS operates seven universities, known as the Concordia University System.

In June 2023, the LCMS published a report criticizing the Concordia University Texas of straying too far from its Lutheran identity. The report cited cases such as the university's efforts to strengthen DEI were "out of harmony with Scripture", and none of the university's science professors reported teaching on creationism. In August 2023, the university filed for a governance independent of the LCMS and declined to seat regents elected at the 2023 LCMS convention.

The LCMS also founded a school in Hong Kong. In 1966, the LCMS co-founded the Hong Kong International School (HKIS) with a group of American business persons in 1966. In 2022, the LCMS sent lawyers to the HKIS to conduct property valuation. It was reported that the campus was valued at $1.1 billion if the land would be redeveloped into commercial and property development. In 2025, the LCMS sued the management of HKIS for allegedly breaching the operational agreement, accusing the HKIS of "serving only the rich and privileged few" and amassing excessive financial reserves. The LCMS threatened to evict the HKIS from its campus and set up a new primary school called Hong Kong Pacific School as a replacement. In response, HKIS denied the allegations and said the school will remains fully operational and unaffected by the legal proceedings.

=== Auxiliary organizations ===
Among the LCMS's other auxiliary organizations are the Lutheran Laymen's League (now known as Lutheran Hour Ministries), which conducts outreach ministries including The Lutheran Hour radio program; and the Lutheran Women's Missionary League. The synod also operates Concordia Publishing House, through which it publishes its official magazine, The Lutheran Witness, and newspaper, Reporter.

The LCMS also operates the LCMS Foundation for trust and benefit purposes and the Lutheran Church Extension Fund to provide loans to LCMS congregations, organizations, and workers.

== Relationship with other Lutheran bodies ==
Maintaining its position as a confessional church body emphasizing the importance of full agreement in the teachings of the Bible, the LCMS is not associated with the majority of ecumenical religious organizations such as the National Council of Churches of Christ in the U.S.A. / National Council of Churches (NCCC-USA) the National Association of Evangelicals (NAE), the World Council of Churches (wCC) or the Lutheran World Federation (LWF). It is, however, a member of the International Lutheran Council (ILC), made up of over 50 Evangelical Lutheran churches worldwide that support the conservative / confessional doctrines of the Bible and the Unaltered Augsburg Confession of 1530, among other generally accepted theological documents, most included in the subsequent seminal Book of Concord of 1580, accepted by worldwide Evangelical Lutheranism.

At the 2007 LC-MS convention, the delegates voted to establish altar and pulpit fellowship with the recently established American Association of Lutheran Churches (AALC).

Although its strongly conservative views on theology and ethics might seem to make the LCMS politically compatible with other Protestant evangelicals and fundamentalists in the United States and around the world, the LCMS largely eschews political activity, partly out of concerns to keep the denomination untainted with potential heresies and also because of its strict understanding of the Lutheran distinction between the Two Kingdoms. However, many LCMS and evangelicals share the common belief that life begins and should be protected by law since conception.

The LCMS is distinguished from the also conservative Wisconsin Evangelical Lutheran Synod (WELS) (the third largest Evangelical Lutheran denomination in the U.S.) by three main theological beliefs:

1. The biblical understanding of fellowship: the LCMS believes in a distinction between the altar, pulpit fellowship, and other manifestations of Christian fellowship (in other words, a prayer fellowship). The WELS does not.
2. The doctrine of the ministry: the LCMS believes that the Pastoral office is divinely established, but all other offices are human institutions and hence are not divinely established. The WELS believes that the Ministry of the Word is divinely established and that congregations and the synod may choose the forms of public ministry they wish to use.
3. The role of women in the church: Although both the LCMS and WELS agree that Scripture reserves the pastoral office and ordination for men, the WELS also believes that Scripture forbids women's suffrage in the congregation and councils.

Respondents to the recent Pew Research Center's U.S. Religious Landscape Survey of 2008 included members of the LCMS and the larger Evangelical Lutheran Church in America (ELCA)

| Pew Survey Results by Denomination | | LCMS | ELCA |
|---|---|---|---|
| Number of adults surveyed out of total of 35,556: | | 588 | 869 |
| Percent of adults in the United States: | | 1.4% | 2.0% |
| Percent of adult Protestants in the United States: | | 2.7% | 3.8% |
| Do you believe in God or a universal spirit? | Absolutely Certain: | 84% | 77% |
| Do you believe in God or a universal spirit? | Fairly Certain: | 12% | 19% |
| Do you believe in God or a universal spirit? | Do not believe in God: | 1% | 0% |
| Do you believe in God or a universal spirit? | Don't Know/Refused/Other: | 1% | 1% |
| The Bible | Word of God to be taken literally word for word: | 42% | 23% |
| The Bible | Word of God, but not literally true word for word/Unsure if literally true: | 39% | 48% |
| The Bible | Book written by men, not the word of God: | 15% | 20% |
| The Bible | Don't Know/Refused/Other: | 4% | 9% |
| Abortion | Abortion should be legal in all cases: | 16% | 18% |
| Abortion | Abortion should be legal in most cases: | 35% | 42% |
| Abortion | Abortion should be illegal in most cases: | 32% | 26% |
| Abortion | Abortion should be illegal in all cases: | 13% | 6% |
| Abortion | Don't know/Refused: | 5% | 7% |
| Interpretation of Religious Teachings | There is only ONE true way to interpret the teachings of my religion: | 28% | 15% |
| Interpretation of Religious Teachings | There is MORE than one true way to interpret the teachings of my religion: | 68% | 82% |
| Interpretation of Religious Teachings | Neither/Both Equally: | 1% | 1% |
| Interpretation of Religious Teachings | Don't Know/Refused: | 3% | 2% |
| Homosexuality | Homosexuality should be accepted: | 44% | 56% |
| Homosexuality | Homosexuality should be discouraged: | 47% | 33% |
| Homosexuality | Neither/Both Equally: | 4% | 3% |
| Homosexuality | Don't Know/Refused: | 5% | 3% |

== Membership and demographics ==
Membership growth was substantial in the first half of the 20th century. According to the Yearbook of American & Canadian Churches, the LCMS had 628,695 members in 1925. By 1950 the number of members had grown to over 1.6 million. Membership peaked in 1970 at just under 2.8 million. In 2020, the LCMS reported 1,861,129 members and 5,976 churches, with 5,938 active clergy. LCMS membership continues to be concentrated in the Upper Midwest. The five states with the highest rates of adherence are Nebraska, Wisconsin, South Dakota, Minnesota, and Iowa.

LCMS Membership Statistics
| Year | Pastors | Congregations | Members | References |
|---|---|---|---|---|
| 1847 | 22 | NA | NA | |
| 1848 | 50 | NA | NA | |
| 1849 | 61 | NA | NA | |
| 1850 | 75 | NA | NA | |
| 1872 | 415 | 543 | NA | |
| 1897 | 1,564 | 1,986 | 687,334 | |
| 1922 | 3,073 | NA | 1,041,514 | |
| 1925 | 3,062 | 3,849 | 628,695 | |
| 1929 | 3,279 | 3,542 | 696,967 | |
| 1935 | 3,605 | 4,224 | 1,230,705 | |
| 1939 | NA | 4,205 | 1,277,097 | |
| 1941 | NA | 4,326 | 1,320,510 | |
| 1944 | NA | 4,075 | 1,356,665 | |
| 1946 | NA | 4,430 | 1,469,213 | |
| 1950 | 4,621 | 4,430 | 1,674,901 | |
| 1951 | 4,661 | 4,478 | 1,728,989 | |
| 1953 | 4,817 | 4,592 | 1,850,100 | |
| 1954 | 4,916 | 4,701 | 1,932,000 | |
| 1955 | 5,020 | 4,805 | 2,004,110 | |
| 1956 | 5,037 | 4,989 | 2,076,550 | |
| 1957 | 5,178 | 4,979 | 2,150,230 | |
| 1958 | 5,299 | 5,028 | 2,234,844 | |
| 1959 | 5,398 | 5,109 | 2,304,962 | |
| 1960 | 5,506 | 5,215 | 2,391,195 | |
| 1961 | 5,658 | 5,276 | 2,464,436 | |
| 1962 | 5,756 | 5,432 | 2,522,095 | |
| 1963 | 6,091 | 5,519 | 2,591,762 | |
| 1964 | 6,257 | 5,556 | 2,650,857 | |
| 1965 | 6,395 | 5,639 | 2,692,889 | |
| 1966 | 6,469 | 5,647 | 2,729,897 | |
| 1967 | 6,572 | 5,707 | 2,759,308 | |
| 1968 | 6,719 | 5,733 | 2,781,892 | |
| 1969 | 6,758 | 5,745 | 2,786,102 | |
| 1970 | 6,866 | 5,690 | 2,788,536 | |
| 1971 | 7,041 | 5,724 | 2,788,110 | |
| 1972 | 7,174 | 5,741 | 2,781,297 | |
| 1973 | 7,316 | 5,777 | 2,776,104 | |
| 1974 | 7,331 | 5,813 | 2,769,594 | |
| 1975 | 7,425 | 5,797 | 2,763,545 | |
| 1976 | 7,414 | 5,832 | 2,757,271 | |
| 1977 | 7,163 | 5,687 | 2,673,321 | |
| 1978 | 7,161 | 5,669 | 2,631,374 | |
| 1979 | 7,211 | 5,689 | 2,623,181 | |
| 1980 | 7,296 | 5,694 | 2,625,650 | |
| 1981 | 7,376 | 5,710 | 2,636,715 | |
| 1982 | 7,559 | 5,752 | 2,630,823 | |
| 1983 | 7,682 | 5,829 | 2,630,947 | |
| 1984 | 7,823 | 5,812 | 2,628,133 | |
| 1985 | 7,954 | 5,876 | 2,638,164 | |
| 1986 | 8,044 | 5,897 | 2,630,588 | |
| 1987 | 8,139 | 5,912 | 2,614,375 | |
| 1988 | 8,193 | 5,939 | 2,604,278 | |
| 1989 | 8,271 | 5,990 | 2,609,025 | |
| 1990 | 8,301 | 5,296 | 2,602,849 | |
| 1991 | 8,389 | 5,364 | 2,607,309 | |
| 1992 | 8,799 | 5,369 | 2,609,905 | |
| 1993 | 8,844 | 6,134 | 2,598,935 | |
| 1994 | 8,879 | 6,148 | 2,596,927 | |
| 1995 | 8,140 | 6,154 | 2,594,555 | |
| 1996 | 8,215 | 6,099 | 2,601,144 | |
| 1997 | 8,672 | 6,215 | 2,603,036 | |
| 1998 | 8,316 | 6,218 | 2,594,404 | |
| 1999 | 8,365 | 6,220 | 2,582,440 | |
| 2000 | 8,257 | 6,150 | 2,554,088 | |
| 2001 | 8,497 | 6,187 | 2,540,045 | |
| 2002 | 8,505 | 6,142 | 2,512,714 | |
| 2003 | 8,515 | 6,160 | 2,488,936 | |
| 2004 | 8,515 | 6,151 | 2,463,747 | |
| 2005 | 8,502 | 6,144 | 2,440,864 | |
| 2006 | 8,601 | 6,155 | 2,417,997 | |
| 2007 | 8,901 | 6,167 | 2,383,084 | |
| 2008 | 9,010 | 6,123 | 2,337,349 | |
| 2009 | 9,357 | 6,178 | 2,312,111 | |
| 2010 | 8,927 | 6,158 | 2,278,586 | |
| 2011 | 7,879 | 6,145 | 2,231,858 | |
| 2012 | NA | 6,151 | 2,196,788 | |
| 2013 | 8,948 | 6,151 | 2,163,698 | |
| 2014 | 9,042 | 6,136 | 2,097,258 | |
| 2015 | 6,049 | 6,101 | 2,060,514 | |
| 2016 | NA | 6,100 | 2,017,834 | |
| 2018 | 6,473 | 6,046 | 1,968,641 | |
| 2020 | 6,308 | 5,976 | 1,861,129 | |
| 2021 | 6,116 | 5,914 | 1,807,408 | |

The Pew Research Center's U.S. Religious Landscape Survey in 2014 found that the LCMS was the third-least racially diverse major religious group in the country. The Evangelical Lutheran Church in America was second and the National Baptist Convention was the least diverse. The 2008 figures were:

| Demographic Results for 2008 | | ELCA | LCMS | Total Population |
|---|---|---|---|---|
| Age | 18–29 | 8% | 11% | 20% |
| Age | 30–49 | 36% | 32% | 39% |
| Age | 50–64 | 29% | 31% | 25% |
| Age | 65+ | 27% | 26% | 16% |
| Marital Status | Never Married | 11% | 11% | 19% |
| Marital Status | Married | 63% | 60% | 54% |
| Marital Status | Living with Partner | 3% | 5% | 6% |
| Marital Status | Divorced/Separated | 10% | 11% | 12% |
| Marital Status | Widowed | 13% | 13% | 8% |
| Children at home under 18 | No Children | 70% | 72% | 65% |
| Children at home under 18 | One Child | 11% | 11% | 13% |
| Children at home under 18 | Two Children | 13% | 10% | 13% |
| Children at home under 18 | Three Children | 5% | 5% | 6% |
| Children at home under 18 | Four or more Children | 1% | 2% | 3% |
| Race | White (non-Hispanic) | 97% | 95% | 71% |
| Race | Black (non-Hispanic) | 1% | 2% | 11% |
| Race | Asian (non-Hispanic) | 1% | 1% | 3% |
| Race | Other/Mixed (non-Hispanic) | 1% | 1% | 3% |
| Race | Hispanic | 1% | 1% | 12% |
| Region | Northeast | 19% | 7% | 19% |
| Region | Midwest | 51% | 64% | 23% |
| Region | South | 16% | 16% | 36% |
| Region | West | 14% | 13% | 22% |
| Gender | Male | 44% | 47% | 48% |
| Gender | Female | 56% | 53% | 52% |
| Level of Education | Less than High School | 6% | 9% | 14% |
| Level of Education | High School Graduate | 38% | 38% | 36% |
| Level of Education | Some College | 26% | 25% | 23% |
| Level of Education | College Graduate | 19% | 18% | 16% |
| Level of Education | Post-graduate | 11% | 9% | 11% |
| Family Income | Less than $30,000 | 24% | 24% | 31% |
| Family Income | $30,000–$49,999 | 24% | 20% | 22% |
| Family Income | $50,000–$74,999 | 21% | 20% | 17% |
| Family Income | $75,000–$99,999 | 15% | 18% | 13% |
| Family Income | $100,000 or more | 17% | 17% | 18% |

In the 20th century, the LCMS grew overall, with 28% of growth being adults who came from non-Lutheran and non-Christian backgrounds.

== See also ==
- Lutheran Church of Australia
- Protestantism in the United States
- Christianity in the United States
