= Evangelical Lutheran Synodical Conference of North America =

Defunct Christian denomination in the United States

The Evangelical Lutheran Synodical Conference of North America (German: Die Evangelisch-lutherische Synodal-Conferenz von Nord-Amerika), often known simply as the Synodical Conference, was an association of Lutheran synods that professed a complete adherence to the Lutheran Confessions and doctrinal unity with each other. Founded in 1872, its membership fluctuated as various synods joined and left it. Due to doctrinal disagreements with the Lutheran Church – Missouri Synod (LCMS), the Evangelical Lutheran Synod (ELS) and the Wisconsin Evangelical Lutheran Synod (WELS) left the conference in 1963. It was dissolved in 1967 and the other remaining member, the Synod of Evangelical Lutheran Churches, merged into the LCMS in 1971.

== History ==
=== Background ===
The 1860s and early 1870s was a period of realignment within American Lutheranism. In 1860, the Evangelical Lutheran General Synod of the United States of North America was the only federation of Lutheran synods in the country. During the previous 20 years a number of new synods had emerged, the result of immigration from the Lutheran regions of Europe. The General Synod had, under Samuel Simon Schmucker, espoused an "American Lutheranism" which downplayed the role and authority of the Lutheran Confessions. In 1864, the General Synod admitted the Frankean Synod, a synod that was notably indifferent to the Lutheran Confessions or to any Lutheran identity. In protest, the Pennsylvania Ministerium and four other synods left the General Synod and issued a call to the various independent synods to form a new and confessionally-based federation. Meetings in Reading, Pennsylvania, in 1866 and Fort Wayne, Indiana, in 1867 led to the formation of the General Council of the Evangelical Lutheran Church in North America.

Despite its professed confessional stance, the General Council allowed divergent teaching regarding millennialism, altar fellowship, sharing of pulpits with non-Lutheran pastors, and lodge membership in an attempt to include the largest number of synods as possible. The Evangelical Lutheran Synod of Iowa and Other States (Iowa Synod) and the Evangelical Lutheran Joint Synod of Ohio and Adjacent States (Ohio Synod) requested satisfactory responses to those Four Points; failing to receive acceptable answers, the Ohio Synod declined to join and the Iowa Synod joined as only a non-voting associate member. The failure of the General Council to adequately address those issues also caused the German Evangelical Lutheran Synod of Wisconsin and Other (Adjacent) States (Wisconsin Synod), the Evangelical Lutheran Synod of Minnesota and Other States (Minnesota Synod), and the Evangelical Lutheran Synod of Illinois and Other (Adjacent) States (Illinois Synod), all charter members, to withdraw from membership by 1872.

Meanwhile, the German Evangelical Lutheran Synod of Missouri, Ohio, and Other States (Missouri Synod) had been in doctrinal discussions with various Midwestern synods and had reached fellowship agreements with several of them: the Synod of the Norwegian Evangelical Lutheran Church in America (Norwegian Synod) in 1857, the Wisconsin Synod in 1869, the Ohio Synod in 1868–1872, and the Illinois Synod and the Minnesota Synod in 1872.

=== Organization ===
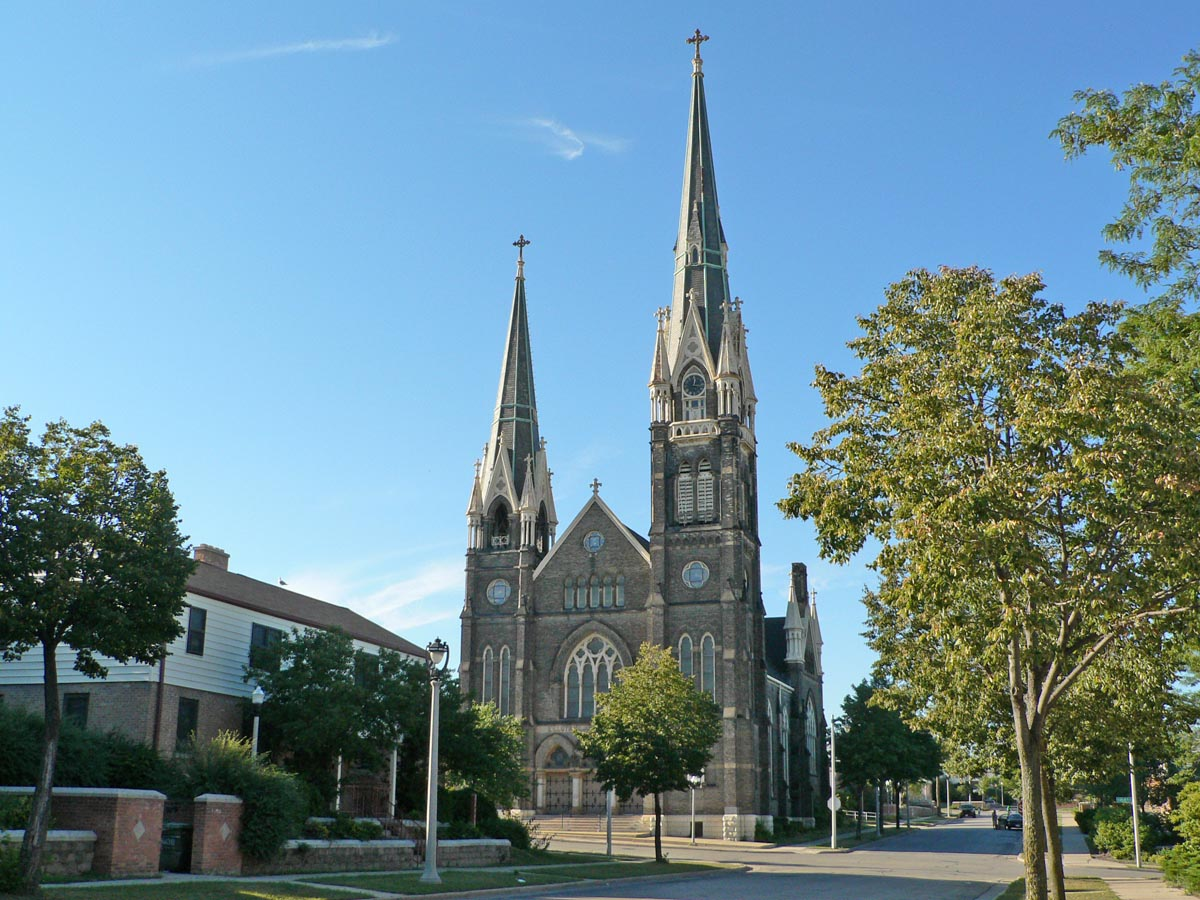
The Synodical Conference was founded at St. John's Evangelical Lutheran Church in Milwaukee, Wisconsin, a member at that time of the Wisconsin Synod.

In October 1870, the Ohio Synod contacted the Illinois, Missouri, Norwegian, and Wisconsin synods to see if they would be interested in a union of Midwestern confessional synods. The synods (except for the Illinois Synod, whose president attended unofficially because that synod was still a member of the General Council) met on January 11–13, 1871, in Chicago to explore the formation of a federation that would be confessional in both profession and practice. A second meeting was held on November 14–16, 1871, in Fort Wayne, Indiana. The Illinois and Minnesota synods, who had by this time both left the General Council, were also in attendance.

The Evangelical Lutheran Synodical Conference of North America was formally organized on July 10–16, 1872, in Milwaukee, Wisconsin, by the Illinois, Minnesota, Missouri, Norwegian, Ohio, and Wisconsin synods as an expression of their unity of faith. The member synods agreed to work together in matters relating to Christian evangelism. Included in this was a sharing of clergy, sharing of educational facilities, and co-operation on evangelism and mission work. Conventions were held every two years, with each synod having at two clergy and two lay representatives with an additional clergy and lay representative for each district in a synod.

In 1876, the Synodical Conference recommended that all congregations using a particular language (e.g., German or Norwegian) be organized into state-specific synods. Therefore, the Evangelical Lutheran Concordia Synod of Virginia, which had joined the Synodical Conference that same year, merged in 1877 into the Ohio Synod. Likewise, the Illinois Synod merged into the Illinois District of the Missouri Synod in 1880.

In 1878, the Wisconsin Synod withdrew its demand that the state synods had to be independent of the Missouri or Ohio Synods. The Missouri Synod needed to build a new seminary due to overcrowding at its campus in St. Louis. Despite considerable planning to build a new joint Synodical Conference seminary near Chicago, the project failed because of hesitance of the part of the Wisconsin Synod and the inability of any of the other members besides the Missouri Synod to contribute financially.

The 1878 convention voted in favor of establishing state synods. These state synods were to organize into two or three larger synods, one for the east (corresponding to the Ohio Synod), one for the southwest (corresponding to the Missouri Synod), and one for the northwest (which would include all congregations in Michigan, Wisconsin, Minnesota, the Dakotas and all parts west). This plan would solve the longstanding concern that if either the Missouri or Ohio synods were allowed to keep their identity, they would dominate the rest of the Synodical Conference, or, even worse, the Minnesota or Wisconsin synods would be forced to join one of them. This new organization did not apply to congregations speaking Norwegian, and English speaking congregations were to organize as separate district synods within one of the larger synods.

=== Predestinarian Controversy ===
Shortly thereafter a dispute known as the Predestinarian Controversy or Election Controversy arose among member synods regarding the cause of election to eternal life. The Ohio and Norwegian synods contended that God elects people in view of the faith (intuitu fidei) he foresaw they would have, while the Missouri and Wisconsin synods held that the cause is wholly due to God's grace. As a result of the controversy, the Ohio Synod withdrew from membership in 1881, and the Norwegian Synod in 1883.

Some of the pastors and congregations in the Ohio Synod disagreed with the stance of that synod and broke away to form the Evangelical Lutheran Concordia Synod of Pennsylvania and Other States. It joined the Synodical Conference in 1882 and merged with the Missouri Synod in 1886.

The chief opponent to C.F.W. Walther during the Predestinarian Controversy was Frederick William Stellhorn.

=== Growth and consolidation ===
In 1890, the English Evangelical Lutheran Synod of Missouri and Other States (English Synod) joined the Synodical Conference. About 20 years later, in 1911, it merged into the Missouri Synod as its non-geographical English District.

The Evangelical Lutheran Synod of Michigan and Other States joined the Conference in 1892. That same year it joined with the Wisconsin and Minnesota synods to form the Evangelical Lutheran Joint Synod of Wisconsin, Minnesota, Michigan, and Other States, which eventually became the Wisconsin Evangelical Lutheran Synod of the present time.

The German Evangelical Lutheran District Synod of Nebraska and Other States (Nebraska Synod) and the Slovak Evangelical Lutheran Church of the Augsburg Confession in the United States of America (Slovak Synod) both joined in 1906, but with final acceptance of their membership delayed until 1910. The Nebraska Synod merged into the Joint Synod of Wisconsin, Minnesota, and Michigan as that body's Nebraska District in 1917.

Meanwhile, the various Norwegian-language synods were undergoing a series of mergers which led, in 1917, to the Norwegian Synod joining with the United Norwegian Lutheran Church of America and the Hauge Synod to form the Norwegian Lutheran Church of America. A group of pastors and congregations in the Norwegian Synod declined to join the merger due to doctrinal disagreements; instead, they formed the Norwegian Synod of the American Evangelical Lutheran Church (known as the Little Norwegian Synod) in 1918 and joined the Synodical Conference in 1920.

After 1920 there were no changes in the membership of the Synodical Conference until its breakup and dissolution in the 1950s and 1960s. Each of the four synods did, however, take on new names. The Missouri Synod became the Lutheran Church – Missouri Synod (LCMS) in 1947, the Little Norwegian Synod became the Evangelical Lutheran Synod (ELS) in 1958, the Wisconsin Synod became the Wisconsin Evangelical Lutheran Synod (WELS) in 1959, and the Slovak Synod became the Synod of Evangelical Lutheran Churches (SELC), also in 1959.

In 1934, the conference began to look into starting mission work in Africa, and later established a mission in Nigeria.

=== Breakup and dissolution ===
Doctrinal differences among the synods of the Synodical Conference, especially concerning the doctrine and practice of fellowship, surfaced during the 1940s and 1950s. Disagreements began when the LCMS began exploratory talks with leaders of the American Lutheran Church (ALC). The ALC, which had been formed in 1930 by the merger of the Ohio, Iowa, and Buffalo synods, differed with the Synodical Conference on the doctrine of predestination. Since there had been no recent change on the ALC's doctrinal position, the LCMS was charged by some within the Synodical Conference of changing its position on church fellowship.

After years of continued talks, the ELS severed its fellowship relations with the LCMS in June 1955. Two years later, the WELS publicly recognized the same doctrinal disagreements with the LCMS, but did not officially break fellowship with the LCMS until August 1961. During that time period, the WELS officially admonished the LCMS to return to its former doctrine and practice.

Dissatisfaction over the WELS decision led about 70 pastors and a similar number of congregations to leave that body in the mid- to late-1950s and, along with former congregations of the ELS and the LCMS, to form the Church of the Lutheran Confession (CLC) in 1961. The CLC maintained that both the WELS and ELS had misapplied the principles of Christian fellowship themselves by not breaking away from the Synodical Conference and the LCMS when doctrinal differences had first been perceived. This issue remains a matter of contention between the CLC and the WELS and ELS.

The Synodical Conference held a series of discussions on the issues, but the divisions were not resolved, leading the ELS and WELS to finally leave the conference in 1963. With the LCMS and the much smaller SELC being the only remaining members, the conference became inactive in 1966 and was officially dissolved in 1967. The SELC merged into the LCMS in 1971 as the non-geographic SELC District.

== African-American mission work ==
=== Southern field ===
In 1877, the Synodical Conference had just severed ties with the two German mission societies it had previously supported, the Leipzig Society and the Hermannsburg Society. Its 1877 convention appointed a committee of three pastors to decide whether the Synodical Conference should devote attention to "heathen mission among the Negroes or Indians". The committee recommended launching this mission this way, "If we make no use of the desire of our Lutheran Christians to do something for heathen missions, they will surely apply their money where we would not like to see it go." The Synodical Conference created a mission board to oversee its "Colored Missions" called "The Mission Board of the Evangelical Lutheran Synodical Conference of North America, for Mission Work Among the Heathen and the Negro," which was often referred to simply as "The Mission Board". The conference elected three members to oversee the mission work, and on October 16 of that same year, John Frederick Doescher was commissioned as a missionary to African-Americans. From October to April, Doescher toured the states of Tennessee, Arkansas, Mississippi, Louisiana, Alabama, and Florida to organize local mission committees to serve those who became interested in his work until a missionary pastor or teacher could be sent.

The first congregation resulting from these efforts was organized in 1878 in Little Rock, Arkansas, as St. Paul's Colored Lutheran Church. Several churches and schools were opened in New Orleans and other towns in Louisiana in the 1880s. By 1890 there were a total of seven mission stations in place—four in New Orleans, one in Little Rock, one in Meherrin, Virginia, and one in Springfield, Illinois.

In 1879, Doescher left the employ of the Mission Board under controversy over his willingness to preach in non-Lutheran churches, and Friederick Berg was called as his replacement. The Mission Board sent him to Little Rock to build on Doescher's work there. Berg was frustrated in his effort when he found that three-fifths of the African Americans to whom he was sent already belonged to Protestant churches. Berg spent most of his time teaching at the Lutheran school, St. Paul Lutheran Academy, but the work drained him. After two years of frustration, Berg left for a white congregation in Indiana in 1881. Several missionaries joined the work and left after only a few years until Nils J. Bakke came, who served from 1880 to 1920.

=== Eastern field ===
In North Carolina, a group of five African-American Lutheran congregations had been associated with the Synod of North Carolina. On May 8, 1889, with the consent and promised support of that synod, the congregations organized the Alpha Synod of the Evangelical Lutheran Church of Freedmen in America. However, the financial support from the North Carolina Synod did not materialize, so the Alpha Synod appealed to the Synodical Conference for help. After an investigation, the Mission Board agreed to work with the Alpha Synod and sent Bakke to help. While he was there, they planted several congregations, and by 1900, there were 12 mission stations in North Carolina. By 1927, there were 23 congregations and preaching stations in North and South Carolina, with 1,328 baptized members. The Immanuel Conference, as it came to be called, expanded to include all outreach to African-Americans in Alabama and Louisiana. In 1932, the Immanuel Conference had 37 congregations or preaching stations, 3,263 members, 2,124 Sunday school students, and 604 day school students.

In 1940, the Immanuel Conference, now called The Eastern Field, began to shrink. The population in the rural areas in which the Eastern Field was focused shrank as more people moved to cities. The quality of public education for African-American students also rose, so Lutheran day schools became less popular. In 1944, a report to the Synodical Conference stated that the Eastern Field had declined to 23 churches and preaching stations ranging from New York to South Carolina.

=== Alabama field ===
Meanwhile, in Rosebud, Alabama, Rosa Young, an African-American and the daughter of a Methodist minister, had started a school in 1912 to give African-American children in the area a good Christian education. The Rosebud Literary and Industrial School soon had over 200 students, but in 1914 the cotton boll weevil infested Wilcox County, and the resulting economic hardship meant that students' families were unable to afford the tuition. Desperate to keep the school open, she requested aid from the Methodist Church, but to no avail. She wrote to Booker T. Washington at the Tuskegee Institute, and he suggested she contact the Synodical Conference. Upon receiving her letter dated October 27, 1915, the Mission Board sent missionary Bakke to Rosebud in January 1916 to investigate. They agreed to support the school and pay Young $20 per month to teach.

Word of the school and resulting Lutheran church in Rosebud spread among the African-American communities in Alabama and neighboring states, with requests being made to the Synodical Conference to start additional schools and churches. By 1927 there were 27 congregations with their associated schools. The number of congregations peaked in the 1930s, and the Great Migration led to the decline of rural communities generally and Lutheran churches in particular. The exodus of African-American Lutherans from Alabama seeded Lutheran congregations across the country. In 1977, 35 African-American pastors in the LCMS could trace their roots to the Alabama Field.

In the 1960s, as the Synodical Conference was breaking up, the African-American congregations and schools were absorbed by the respective geographical districts of the LCMS. In 1961, there were 54 congregations with 33 pastors and 8,600 members, the numbers having declined from 108 congregations with 72 pastors and 16,579 members in 1950.

=== Higher education ===
The Synodical Conference opened Immanuel Lutheran College in Concord, North Carolina, in 1903 to train African-American teachers and pastors for the schools and churches that had been established. In 1905 the college was relocated to a 14.5-acre (5.9 ha) campus in Greensboro that cost $28,394 to construct. Initially the college consisted of three departments, namely, a four-year high school, a one-year normal school for teachers, and a three-year theological seminary for pastors. By 1951 it had a faculty of ten and a student body of about 100, with about 30 graduates each year from the three departments. Nevertheless, Immanuel struggled to maintain its enrollment, and multiple resolutions to close it were made at Synodical Conference conventions in the 1940s and 1950s. Those resolutions failed to pass, and attempts to increase enrollment were made. Eventually the integration of the colleges and seminaries of the member synods of the Synodical Conference led to the passage of a resolution at the 1960 convention to close Immanuel as of June 30, 1961. The campus was sold to the state of North Carolina, and the library was transferred to the Alabama Lutheran Academy in Selma.

Also in 1903, the conference opened Luther College in New Orleans, Louisiana, in a new two-story building costing $4,007. Originally it had the same three departments as Immanuel, but in 1910 the seminary department was closed, having graduated only one pastor. The entire college was closed in 1925, in part because the lack of the seminary department prevented the school from meeting its primary purpose, but also because the conference decided the funds needed to erect new buildings would be better spent supporting Immanuel and the new college in Alabama.

In 1919, the African-American congregations in Alabama petitioned the Synodical Conference for funds to open a high school and college to train church workers. The school opened in 1922 in a rented cottage, and the Mission Board soon purchased 13 acres (5.3 ha) in northeast Selma, Alabama, as the site of the Alabama Luther College. A recitation hall and a dormitory were erected at a cost of $36,000 and opened in 1925. The college was forced to close during the Great Depression and the remaining high school was renamed the Alabama Lutheran Academy. Eventually the college was reopened, resulting in the name Alabama Lutheran Academy and College. The institution was renamed Concordia College Alabama in 1981 and was part of the Concordia University System of the LCMS. However, due to financial difficulties and declining enrollment, it closed in 2018.

== Successor organizations ==
The WELS and ELS remained in fellowship with each other after leaving the Synodical Conference. Those two church bodies formed the Confessional Evangelical Lutheran Conference (CELC) in 1993 with 13 Lutheran church bodies in other countries.

The Lutheran Church – Missouri Synod (LCMS) and the Synod of Evangelical Lutheran Churches (SELC) joined with the Lutheran Church in America (LCA) and the American Lutheran Church (ALC) in 1967 to form the Lutheran Council in the United States of America (LCUSA). In 1971 the SELC merged into the LCMS as the SELC District. LCUSA itself ceased operations in 1988 upon the merger of the LCA and ALC that created the Evangelical Lutheran Church in America (ELCA).

The LCMS and its partner churches worldwide formed the International Lutheran Conference (ILC) in 1993 after holding informal conferences periodically since the 1950s. Two other Lutheran denominations in the U.S. have joined the ILC since 2000: the American Association of Lutheran Churches and the Lutheran Ministerium and Synod – USA.

== Presidents ==
The Synodical Conference had 12 presidents:

- C. F. W. Walther (1872–1873)
- W. F. Lehmann (1873–1876, 1877–1880)
- Herman Amberg Preus (1876–1877)
- P. L. Larsen (1880–1882)
- J. Bading (1882–1912)
- C. Gausewitz (1912–1927)
- Ludwig E. Fuerbringer (1927–1944)
- E. B. Schlueter (1944–1950)
- G. C. Barth (1950–1952)
- W. A. Baepler (1952–1956)
- J. S. Bradac (1956–1960)
- J. Daniel (1960–1967)
