= English Evangelical Lutheran Synod of the Northwest =

Defunct Lutheran synod in the United States

English Evangelical Lutheran Synod of the Northwest (Northwest Synod) was formed in September 1891 as a synod within the General Council of the Evangelical Lutheran Church in North America. Congregations within the synod used English as their primary language to connect with younger generations of English-speakers. The Northwest Synod covered a geographical territory from Milwaukee to Seattle, although few Lutherans lived between Minnesota and Washington. On September 25, 1901 the Northwest Synod split to create the Pacific Synod on the Pacific coast. The Northwest Synod was divided into three conferences: Central Conference, Western Conference, and Wisconsin Conference.

The Northwestern Lutheran Theological Seminary (also known as the Chicago Lutheran Divinity School) was founded in Chicago, Illinois, in 1920 and was moved a year later to Fargo, North Dakota, and the following year, to Minneapolis, Minnesota. It merged with Luther Theological Seminary to form Luther Northwestern Theological Seminary in 1982 and was renamed Luther Seminary in July 1994.

The General Council later merged with the General Synod and the United Synod of the South to form the United Lutheran Church in 1918. When the United Lutheran Church merged with the Augustana Evangelical Lutheran Church, the American Evangelical Lutheran Church, and the Finnish Evangelical Lutheran Church of America to form the Lutheran Church in America in 1963, the Northwest Synod was dissolved.

== Presidents ==
The Northwest Synod had a total of ten presidents:

- 1891-1893 - George Henry Gerberding
- 1894-1901 - William K. Frick
- 1901-1903 - George H. Trabert
- 1904-1905 - Alex J. D. Haupt
- 1905-1911 - Albert J. Reichert
- 1911-1916 - A. F. Elmquist
- 1917-1927 - George Keller Rubrecht
- 1927-1948 - R. H. Gerberding
- 1949-1959 - Paul E. Bishop
- 1959-1962 - George L. Lundquist
