= Agenda (liturgy) =

Official books dealing with the forms and ceremonies of divine service

The name Agenda ("Things to be Done"; Germ. Agende or Kirchenagende) is given, particularly in the Lutheran Church, to the official books dealing with the forms and ceremonies of divine service.

== Equivalent terms prior to the Reformation ==
The term Agenda occurs twice in the ninth canon of the Second Synod of Carthage (390; Bruns, Canones, i., Berlin, 1839, p. 121), and in a letter of Innocent I. (d. 417; MPL, xx. 552). The name was frequently employed in a more specific sense, as Agenda missarum, for the celebration of the mass; agenda diei, for the office of the day; agenda mortuórum, for the service for the dead; and agenda matutina and agenda vespertina, for morning and evening prayers. As the designation of a book of liturgical formulas it is stated by Ducange to have been used by Johannes de Janua, but in the only published work of Johannes (c. 1287) the name does not occur. There is no doubt, however, that with the development of the ritual of the Church the classification of liturgical formulas for the use of the parochial clergy became common. Such books of procedure were known by various names; e.g., manuale, obsequiale, benedictionale, rituale, and agenda. The last title was given especially to the church books of particular dioceses wherein the general ritual of the Church was supplemented by ceremonial features of local origin, as the agenda for Magdeburg of 1497, or the Liber agendarum secundum ritum ecclesiæ et diocesis Sleswicensis of 1512. However, the use of the term in the Roman Catholic Church practically ceases with the Reformation, though a few instances occur in the sixteenth and seventeenth centuries. In the Evangelical Churches, on the contrary, with the title Kirchenbuch, it speedily came to be the accepted designation for authoritative books of ritual. In the early days of the Reformation the agenda not infrequently constituted part of the Kirchenordnung or general church constitutions of a state; but in the course of time the separation of the formulas of worship from the legal and administrative codes of the Church was effected.

== Lutheran changes to Roman Catholic liturgical rituals ==
The earliest attempts at a reformation of the Roman ritual were naturally concerned with the mass. The innovations consisted of the omission of certain parts of the Roman ceremonial and the substitution of German for Latin, instances of the use of the vernacular in the celebration of the mass occurring as early as 1521–22. In 1523 Martin Luther published his Latin mass, revised in accordance with evangelical doctrine; and three years later he gave to the world his Deutsche Messe und Ordnung des Gottesdiensts, the use of which, however, was not made obligatory. In the same year appeared his "Book of Baptism", in 1529 probably his "Book of Marriage", and during the years 1535–37 the formula for the ordination of ministers. In the Kirchenordnungen of the time, orders of worship occur, as in Thomas Münzer's Deutzsch kirchen ampt, of 1523, and the Landesordnung of the Duchy of Prussia in 1525. From this time to the end of the sixteenth century the Protestant states of Germany were busied with the task of remodeling their ecclesiastical systems and formularies of worship, the work being carried on by the great theologians of the age. The church constitutions and agenda of this period may be divided into three classes:

1. Those that closely followed the Lutheran model
2. Those that followed the ideas of the Swiss Reformation
3. Those that retained appreciable elements of the Roman ritual

Of the first type the earliest examples are the constitutions drawn up by Bugenhagen for the city of Brunswick and the Principality of Brunswick-Wolfenbüttel, 1528; Hamburg, 1529; Lübeck, 1531; Pomerania, 1535; Denmark, 1537; Sleswick-Holstein, 1542; and Hildesheim, 1544. Justus Jonas formulated the church laws of Wittenberg (in part), 1533; of the duchy of Saxony (where the name "agenda" was first adopted), 1539; and of Halle, 1541. Hanover received its laws from Urbanus Rhegius in 1536; Brandenburg-Nuremberg, from Andreas Osiander and Johannes Brenz in 1533; and Mecklenburg, from Riebling, Aurifaber, and Melanchthon in 1540 and 1552. Among the states that adopted constitutions of the Reformed type were Hesse and Nassau, between 1527 and 1576; more closely, Württemberg, 1536; the Electorate of the Palatinate, 1554; and Baden, 1556. In the so-called "Cologne Reformation", drawn up largely by Butzer and Melanchthon and introduced by Archbishop Hermann of Wied in 1543, the agenda of Saxony, Brandenburg-Nuremberg, and Hesse-Cassel served as models. The Roman ritual was retained to some extent in the church ordinances of the electorate of Brandenburg, 1540; Palatinate-Neuburg, 1543; and Austria, 1571. Of this type, too, were the ordinances drawn up by Melanchthon, Bugenhagen, Major, and others, for the electorate of Saxony in 1549; but these never went into effect, giving place in 1580 to a constitution Lutheran in character.

The Thirty Years' War exercised a disastrous influence on the entire ecclesiastical system of Germany, and particularly on church discipline. The work of restoration, however, was begun almost immediately after the cessation of hostilities, but so great was the moral degradation in which the mass of the people was plunged, so low was the standard of education and general intelligence, that in the formulation of new ecclesiastical laws the governments, of necessity, assumed a far larger share of authority over the affairs of the Church than they had possessed before the war. This increased power of the government was apparent not only in a closer supervision over the ecclesiastical administration, but also in the enforcement of a stricter adherence to the formulated modes of worship. Of the agenda promulgated after the war, the most important were those of Mecklenburg, 1650; Saxony and Westphalia, 1651; Brunswick-Lüneburg, 1657; Hesse, 1657; and Halle, 1660.

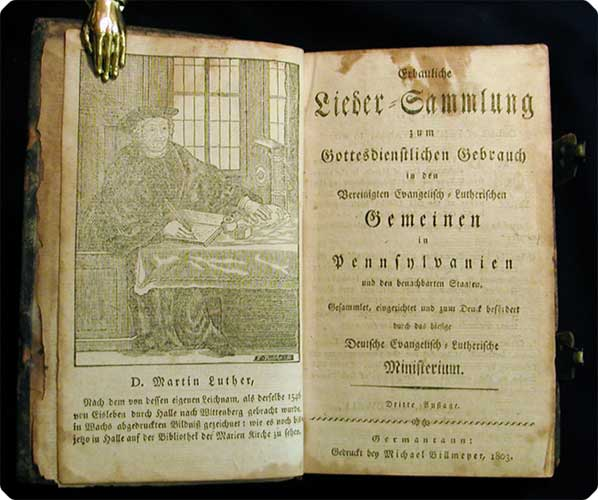
An American Lutheran hymnal, published in German in 1803.

The eighteenth century witnessed a marked decline in the importance of the official liturgies in the religious life of the nation – a loss of influence so great as to make the books of the Church practically obsolescent. This was due to the rise of the pietistic movement, which, in its opposition to formula and rigidity in doctrine, was no less destructive of the old ritual than was the rationalistic movement of the latter half of the century. Both pietism and rationalism were wanting in respect for the element of historical evolution in religion and worship; and the former, in laying stress on the value of individual prayer and devotion without attempting any change in the forms of divine service, led to their general abandonment for the spiritual edification that was to be obtained in the societies organized for common improvement, the so-called collegia pietatis. Rationalism in lending its own interpretation to the ritual, deprived it of much of its practical bearing, and necessitated, in consequence, a radical reconstruction of the prayers and hymns of the Church. But a no less important cause of change in liturgical forms is to be found in the growth of social distinctions and in the rise of a courtly etiquette that sought, with success, to impose its standards of manners and speech on the ceremonies and language of the Church. The etiquette of the salon entered the Church, and the formula "Take thou and eat", at the Lord's Supper, was altered to "Take Ye and eat" when the communicants were of the nobility. The consistory of Hanover in 1800 granted permission to its ministers to introduce during public worship such changes in language, costume, and gesture as would appeal to the tastes of their "refined audiences". As a result, the old official agenda passed generally out of use and were replaced by books of worship representing the views of individual ministers.

== Use in the Reformed Church ==
In the Evangelical Churches outside of Germany books of ritual were drawn up during the early years of the Reformation. In 1525 Zwingli published the order of the mass as celebrated at Zurich and a formula of baptism based on the "Book of Baptism", issued by Leo Judæ in 1523. A complete agenda, including the two Zwinglian codes, appeared at Zurich in 1525 (according to Harnack and others, but more probably in 1529), under the title Ordnung der Christenlichen Kirchen zu Zürich, and was often revised during the sixteenth and seventeenth centuries. Bern received its first formulary in 1528; Schaffhausen, in 1592, and St. Gall in 1738. Neuchatel, in 1533, was the first French-speaking community to adopt a definite ritual; its authorship has been attributed to Farel.

At Geneva, Calvin published in 1542, La Forme des prières ecclésiastiques, based on the practises he had found among the French of Strasburg during his sojourn in that city from 1538 to 1541. The Strasburg ritual was followed also by the French in London, and by many churches in France itself. Deserving of special mention are the constitutions drawn up in 1550 by Johannes a Lasco for the fugitives from the Netherlands resident in England. They form the first comprehensive formulation of the ritual of Calvinistic Protestantism, and are still in force in the Netherland Church.

== Revival by Frederick William III ==
In Germany the return to a uniform, authoritative mode of worship was begun by Frederick William III of Prussia in the early years of the nineteenth century. After 1613 the royal family of Prussia were adherents of the Reformed creed, but the king's personal beliefs were entirely Lutheran. After the campaign of Jena (1806) he entrusted the task of drafting a ritual to Ruhlemann Friedrich Eylert, whose work, however, failed to receive the king's approval because the author had fallen into the then common error of the writers of liturgies, namely, of paying little regard to the historical development of the evangelical forms of worship. Frederick William protested vehemently against these newly fabricated rituals, and asserted the necessity of "going back to Father Luther." With this purpose he devoted many years to the personal study of ritualistic history and attained an expert knowledge of the subject, particularly of its phases in the sixteenth century. The refusal of the great mass of the Old Lutheran clergy to lend themselves to his efforts in favor of unity because of the Lutheran doctrine of Real Presence (see: Prussian Union), he met with the determination to make use of the power vested in him by law to bring about the desired end. In 1822 he published the agenda for the court and cathedral church of Berlin; and two years later this formulary, increased and revised with the aid of Borowsky and Bunsen, was submitted to the various consistories. Before the end of 1825, out of 7,782 churches within the Prussian dominions, 5,243 had adopted the proposed regulations. In spite of a bitter polemic, in which Schleiermacher led the assault on the king's innovations, the new regulations were introduced in all the provinces before 1838. This caused reaction called Neo-Lutheranism.

== In the modern Lutheran Church ==
The king's agenda, however, did not cease to be the subject of much criticism. In 1856 it was improved; and in 1879 the General Synod determined upon a thorough revision. The work was entrusted to a committee of twenty-three, among whom were the theologians Goltz, Kleinert, Hering, Meuss, Renner, Rübesamen, Kögel, and Schmalenbach; and in 1894 their draft of a new ritual was adopted with slight changes by the General Synod. The lead of Prussia was followed by the other members of the German Empire, and most of the states revised their agenda. Bohemia and Moravia (both Lutherans and Calvinists), Denmark, Norway, Poland, Russia, Sweden, and Transylvania have also late revisions. In France, after much agitation, a book of ritual, Liturgie des Églises reformées, de France revisées par le Synode général, was adopted in 1897. Wilhelm Löhe's Agende für christliche Gemeinden (1848) forms also important part of the history of liturgy of Lutheran Church. 20th century Liturgical Movement finally made major restoration of liturgy.

== English-language liturgies ==
The Church of England adopted the Book of Common Prayer under Edward VI, which, with slight revisions, has been made universally obligatory by acts of uniformity. It was used with modifications by the Protestant Episcopal Church of the United States. H. M. Mühlenberg prepared a liturgy that was adopted by the Lutheran Synod that he had organized (1748) and approved by the German Lutheran authorities at Halle, whose missionary he was. It was based upon those in use in Lüneburg (1643 onward), Calenberg (1569 onward), Brandenburg-Magdeburg (1739 onward), and Saxony (1712 onward). The liturgy of the Savoy Lutheran Church of London was the only one, apparently, actually in hand, the others exerting their influence through Mühlenberg's memory Forms for baptism and the marriage ceremony were taken from the Book of Common Prayer of the Church of England. In 1795 Kunze published A Hymn and Prayer Book for the use of such Lutheran Churches as use the English Language, which has by successive revisions developed into the present English Church Book. In 1806, the New York Ministerium adopted a liturgy modified by Episcopal influence, and in 1818, the Philadelphia ministerium adopted a liturgy in which extemporaneous prayer was allowed as well as freedom in selecting the Scriptures to be read. In 1885 after much controversy and conference the General Synod adopted a "Common Service," which was widely accepted by the churches, but was not regarded as obligatory.

The Dutch Reformed Church in the United States adopted (1771) along with the Belgic Confession, the Heidelberg Catechism, and the Canons of the Synod of Dort, the liturgical forms that were at that time in use in the Netherlands. The Nicene Creed and Athanasian Creed are appended to the liturgy, which has undergone little change. The German Reformed Church in the United States seems to have used the Palatinate liturgy, with local modifications. In 1841 the Eastern Synod published a liturgy prepared by Lewis Mayer, which, however, failed of general approval. A "Provisional Liturgy", prepared by Philip Schaff and others (1857), likewise proved unacceptable. The "Order of Worship" was allowed by the General Synod (1866) as was also the "Western Liturgy" (1869). The "Directory of Worship" was adopted in 1887. A book of liturgical forms, prepared by Henry Van Dyke and others appointed by the General Assembly, for use in Presbyterian Churches, but in no way obligatory, was published in 1906. It aroused considerable opposition.

== Batak-language liturgies ==
Since the beginning of the evangelism in the Batak Lands (1850s) by European (Protestant) evangelists, the desire to organize a liturgy or Sunday worship system and other church events has echoed and efforts have been made. This is evident from the reports of evangelists, as seen from the report on evangelism activities in the Silindung Valley (North Sumatra) by Ludwig Ingwer Nommensen (Hutadame), Peter H.Johannsen (Pansurnapitu) and August Mohri (Sipoholon). In their respective places of service, they have made initial ideas for creating Sunday worship systems, baptism services, communion, confirmation of faith, marriage, and others. And all of this has culminated in an Agenda book, and it is very likely that the first edition of the Agenda was the "1904 Agenda", which became a reference for the presentation in seeking the theological and practical foundations of the Batak Christian Protestant Church Agenda for future use. This assumption is supported by the existence of a guidebook and explanation of the rules of worship and its accessories, which was published in a German language edition in 1906 and a Toba Batak language edition in 1907.

== See also ==
- Liturgics
- Church Order (Lutheran)
- Lord's Supper
- Christian liturgy
- Christian worship
- Divine Service (Lutheran)
- Liturgical Movement
- High Church Lutheranism
