= Benjamin Kurtz =

German-American pastor and theologian

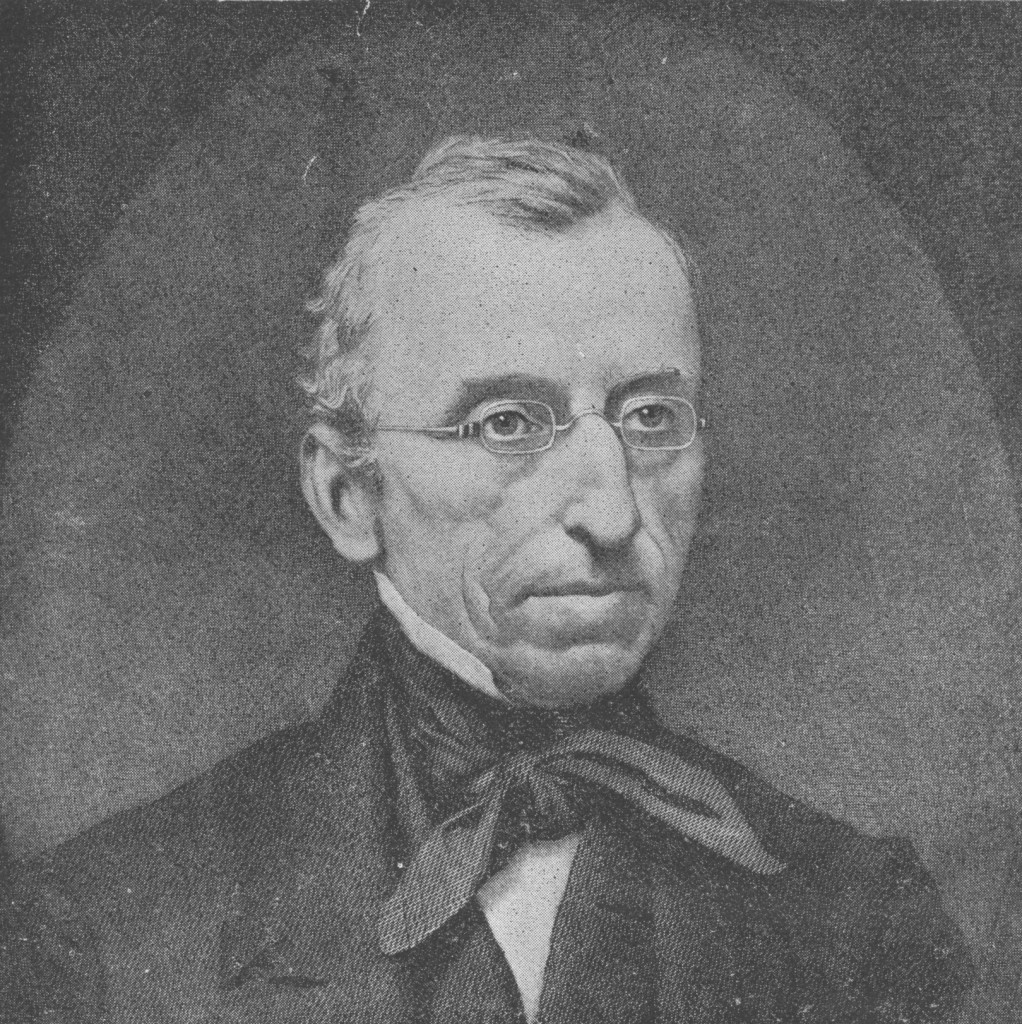
- Born: February 28, 1795; Harrisburg, Pennsylvania
- Died: December 29, 1865; Baltimore, Maryland
- Education: Harrisburg Academy; Washington & Jefferson College; Wittenberg College
- Church: Lutheran: Pennsylvania Ministerium; General Synod
- Offices held: President, Susquehanna University; Founder, Susquehanna University
- Title: Ordained pastor

Benjamin Kurtz (February 28, 1795 – December 29, 1865) was a German-American Lutheran pastor and theologian. He was part of the revivalist movement of the Lutheran Church in the 19th century, ran the Lutheran faith-based newspaper Lutheran Observer, founded the Lutheran faith-based Missionary Institute (Susquehanna University) in Selinsgrove, Pennsylvania, and assisted in the founding of the Gettysburg Seminary.

== Early life ==
Benjamin Kurtz was born February 28, 1795, in Harrisburg, Pennsylvania. His family came from a line of German Lutheran ministers and religious affiliates. His uncle, Dr. John Daniel Kurtz, was one of the founders of the Evangelical Lutheran General Synod of the United States of America, and had studied under Gotthilf Heinrich Ernst Muhlenberg, founder of Muhlenberg College, and served as a minister in York, Pennsylvania and Baltimore, Maryland. His grandfather, Dr. John Nicholas Kurtz, a clergyman from Lutzelinden, Nassau-Weilburg, Germany and a graduate from the University of Halle, arrived in Pennsylvania on January 15, 1745, and served as a minister in Tulpehocken and York, Pennsylvania.

Kurtz began his studies in Harrisburg Academy, where he, by the age of fifteen, would become an assistant teacher. At the age of eighteen, Kurtz began studying theology at Lebanon, Pennsylvania, and two years later was licensed to preach. At that time, in 1815, he became an assistant preacher to his uncle, John Daniel Kurtz, then a pastor at Baltimore. That same year, he became a pastor at Hagerstown, Maryland, where he remained for sixteen years. In 1831, he moved to Chambersburg, Pennsylvania, to lead a ministry, where he would remain for another three years. In 1833, Kurtz retired from active ministry duties and took charge of the Lutheran Observer, a post which he held for nearly thirty years. In 1838, he received the degree of Doctor of Divinity from Washington College in Washington, Pennsylvania, and in 1858, that of LL. D. from Wittenberg College in Springfield, Ohio.

== Legacy ==
Kurtz was regarded as one of the most eloquent men of his time. He was a zealous advocate of revivals, and had very little sympathy with the confessional writings of the Lutheran church. For this, Wilhelm Sihler of the Missouri Synod criticized Kurtz, terming him "apostate" and asserting that Kurtz and other like-minded leaders of the General Synod were "open counterfeiters, Calvinists, Methodists, and Unionists...traitors and destroyers of the Lutheran Church".

Kurtz was one of the founders of the General Synod and of the Lutheran Theological Seminary at Gettysburg, and for more than thirty years was one of the trustees of Pennsylvania College and of the board of directors of the seminary. He was also the founder of Missionary Institute (now Susquehanna University) at Selinsgrove, Pennsylvania. During his two European tours, in 1825 and 1846, he contributed interesting incidents and reminiscences to the Lutheran Intelligencer and to the Lutheran Observer.

A General Synod leader, he was twice its president. He collaborated in Samuel Simon Schmucker's (q.v., Vol. X) Definite Synodical Platform, and championed doctrinal positions differing from the Lutheran Confessions. He was also a prominent Lutheran publisher, publishing religious topics regarding faith and religious child rearing.

== Susquehanna University ==
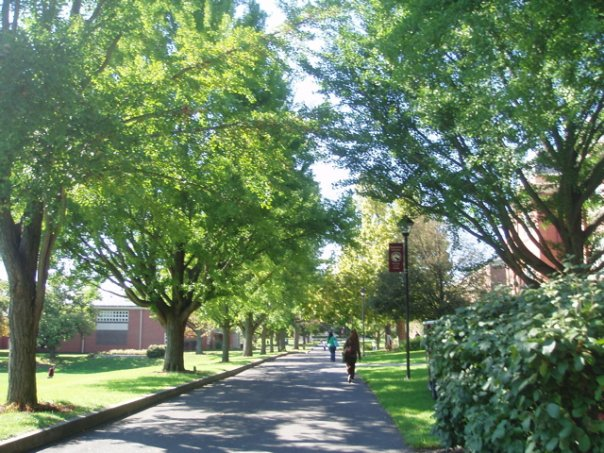
The Path at Susquehanna University

Benjamin Kurtz founded the Missionary Institute in 1858, and led the institution as its first president from 1858 to 1865, during which he was also the first professor of the Theology Department. In 1895, the Missionary Institute merged with its sister college, Susquehanna Female College, to form Susquehanna University.

== Publications ==
Among his publications were:

- First Principles of Religion for Children (Hagerstown, 1821)
- Sermons on Sabbath-Schools (1822)
- Faith, Hope, and Charity (1823)
- Infant Baptism and Affusion, with Essays on Related Subjects (Baltimore, 1840)
- Theological Sketch-Book, or Skeletons of Sermons, Carefully arranged in Systematic Order, partly original, partly selected (2 vols., 1844)
- Why are You a Lutheran? (1847)
- Lutheran Prayer-Book (1856)
