= Theodore Emanuel Schmauk =

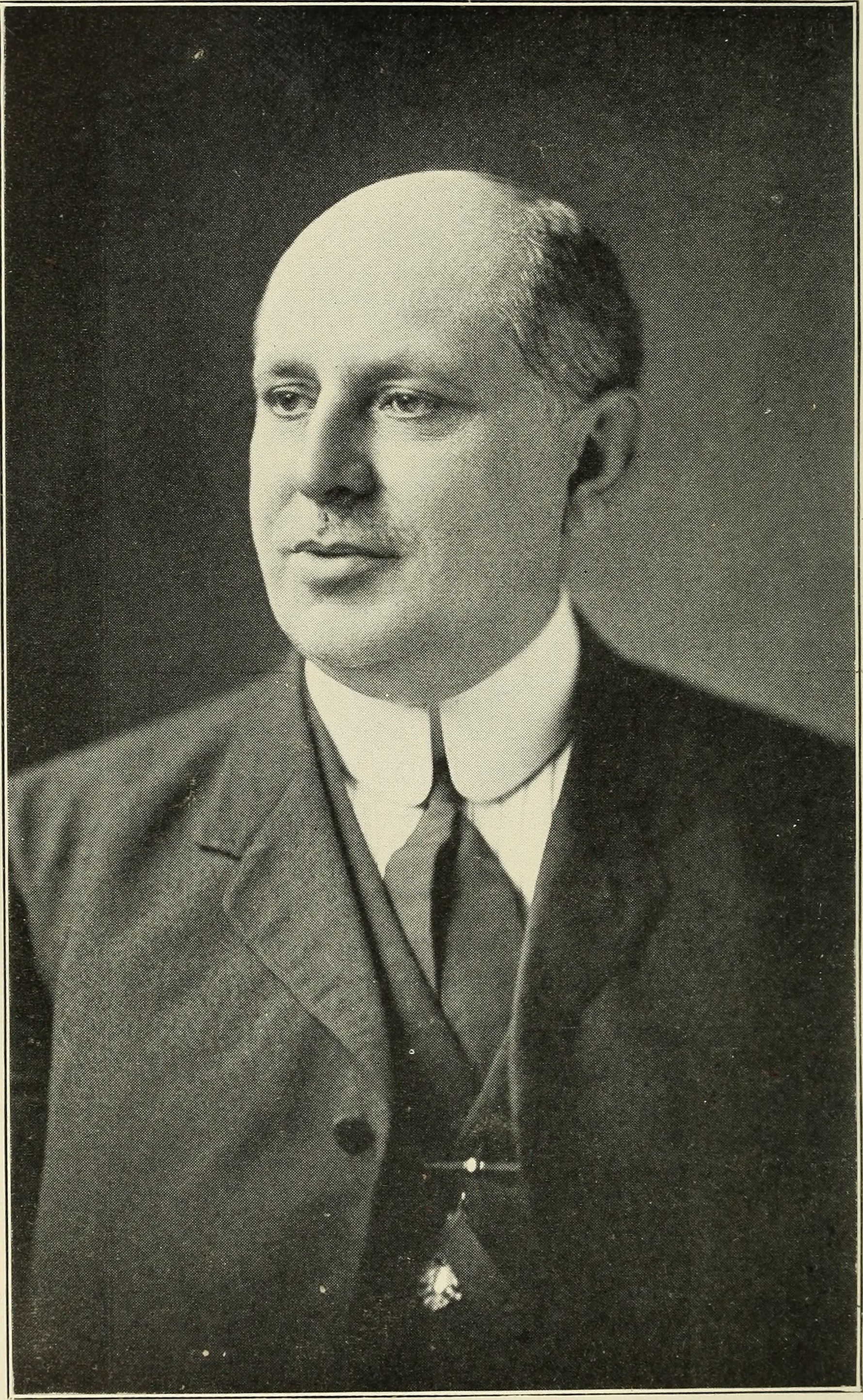
Theodore Emanuel Schmauk

Theodore Emanuel Schmauk, D.D., LL.D. (May 30, 1860 - March 23, 1920) was an American Lutheran minister, educator, author and Church theologian.

Theodore Emanuel Schmauk was born in Lancaster, Pennsylvania, the son of a Lutheran minister, Rev. Benjamin W. and Wilhelmina C. (Hingel) Schmauk. He graduated from the University of Pennsylvania, (class of 1883) being ordained by the Ministerium of Pennsylvania in that year. In 1897, he received the degree of D.D. from Muhlenberg College and in 1910, the degree of LL.D. from Augustana College.

He first went into church work as a Lutheran pastor at Lebanon, Pennsylvania (1883–1903). He became editor in chief of the Lutheran Church Review, which he had helped found and organize. (1889–1920). Between 1903 and 1920, Dr. Schmauk served in numerous capacities with the United Lutheran Church in America. Dr. Schmauk was president of the General Council of the Evangelical Lutheran Church in North American (1903–20).

He was one of the organizers of the Pennsylvania Chautauqua (1892); one of the organizers of the Pennsylvania Dutch Society (1891); and one of the organizers of the Lebanon County Historical Society (1898). Dr. Schmauk was President of the Board of Directors of the Lutheran Theological Seminary at Philadelphia, (1908–20) and in charge of the Department of Ethics, Apologetics and Pedagogy, (1911–20).

== Selected works ==
- Charms of Conversation (1889)
- The Voice in Speech and Song(1891)
- Catechetical Outlines (1892)
- The Fugitive Criticism of the Old Testament (1894)
- History of Old Salem in Lebanon (1898)
- Manual of Bible Geography (1901)
- The Early Churches of the Lebanon Valley (1902)
- History of the Lutheran Church in Pennsylvania (1903)
- Bible Facts and Scenes (1905)
- The Christian Kindergarten (1906)
- The Confessional Principle and the Confessions of the Lutheran Church (1909)
- Account of the German Inhabitants of Pennsylvania (1910)
- Christianity and Christian Union (1913)
- How to Teach in Sunday School (1920)
- Annotated Bibliography of Religious Education and Child Psychology (1920)

== Other sources ==
- Sandt, George W. Theodore Emanuel Schmauk, D.D., L.L.D. A Biographical Sketch (United Lutheran Publication House. 1921)
