= New York Ministerium =

Lutheran synod

- Classification: Protestant
- Orientation: Lutheran
- Associations: General Synod (1837-1866); General Council (1867-1917); United Lutheran Church in America (1917-1929)
- Region: New York and adjacent states
- Language: English & German
- Territory: New York and adjacent states
- Founder: John Christopher Kunze
- Origin: 1786
- Separations: Hartwick Synod (1830); New Jersey Synod (1859); Steimle Synod (1866); New York Synod (1867); Synod of New York and New England (1902)
- Merged into: United Lutheran Synod of New York (1929)
- Other name(s): Ministerium of New York

The New York Ministerium, also known as the Ministerium of New York, was an early Lutheran synod founded in 1786 in the U.S. state of New York. Throughout its history there were theological controversies that led to congregations withdrawing from it to form new synods. In 1917, it became part of the United Lutheran Church in America, which was one of the predecessor bodies of today's Evangelical Lutheran Church in America.

== History ==
Starting in 1640, the Lutheran Church in New Netherland had formed two Lutheran congregations in New York City and Albany by about 1690. The missionary Justus Falckner oversaw expansion starting in the early 18th century, resulting in 14 congregations under his care. His successor, Wilhelm Christoph Berkenmeyer, created an assembly of pastors and lay delegates in 1835 to handle issues arising in the congregations, but the assembly met only once.

In 1786, John Christopher Kunze led efforts to create the New York Ministerium at an assembly in Albany, New York, and served as its president until his death in 1807. Kunze stated in 1795 and again in 1800 that the Ministerium was actually a revival of the Evangelical Ministry of New York State that Frederick A. C. Muhlenberg had organized in 1773, but no records of that earlier group have survived.

The New York Ministerium passed a resolution at its initial meeting to "regard" the constitution of the larger Pennsylvania Ministerium as its own, except that while the Pennsylvania body consisted only of pastors, the New York body consisted of both pastors and lay delegates, except that the examination and discipline of pastors and candidates was handled exclusively by the clergy. The original constitution of 1786 specified adherence to the Lutheran Confessions, but in 1794, the wording of the new constitution of the Pennsylvania Ministerium, which did not contain a confessional subscription, was adopted. The New York Ministerium was a German-speaking body until 1806, when, after a bitter controversy, English was adopted as the official language.

Frederick H. Quitman succeeded Kunze as the second president of the Ministerium. His presidency saw the spread of Rationalism and Socinianism among the churches. In his 1804 revision of the catechism that Kunze had published, Quitman removed the item that treated the real presence of Christ's body and blood in the Lord's Supper. In his own catechism, published in 1814 with the Ministerium's approval, he omitted or denied various doctrines, such as the Trinity, the deity of Christ, the vicarious atonement, and justification for the sake of Christ.

In 1820, the Ministerium sent representatives to the first meeting of the General Synod that proposed to unite all the Lutheran synods in North America, but it decided not to join. That decision, along with the Ministerium's reluctance to endorse revivals, led its Western Conference to withdraw and form the Hartwick Synod in 1830. The Hartwick Synod suffered a split itself in 1837, when some of its members withdrew and formed the Franckean Synod, which was thoroughly pietistic and revivalistic. That same year, the Ministerium joined the General Synod.

After the Hartwick Synod was formed, the New York Ministerium became more conservative and added a formal subscription of the Lutheran Confessions as "substantially correct" to its constitution. The conservative stance was aided by the immigration of large numbers of German Lutherans by 1860. However, in 1866, a group led by Pastor Friedrich Wilhelm Tobias Steimle thought the Ministerium's subscription to the Confessions was not strong enough and withdrew to form the German Evangelical Lutheran Synod of New York and Other States, commonly known as the Steimle Synod. That group (except for Steimle himself) rejoined the Ministerium in 1872 after the Ministerium changed its constitution to require adherence to all the Confessions.

When the Franckean Synod was received into membership in the General Synod in 1864, the Ministerium protested and, in 1866, withdrew from the General Synod. In 1867, the Ministerium became one of the founding members of the General Council, which was more conservative than the General Synod.

In 1859, a group of seven English-speaking pastors and their congregations withdrew from the Ministerium and, in 1861, formed the Evangelical Lutheran Synod of New Jersey. A group who wanted to remain in the General Synod after the Ministerium had joined the General Council formed the Evangelical Lutheran Synod of New York. In 1872, those two synods merged to form the Evangelical Lutheran Synod of New York and New Jersey. In 1908, that synod in turn merged with the Hartwick, Franckean, and Melancthon synods, all members of the General Synod, to form the Synod of New York of the Evangelical Lutheran Church.

Another group, which included St. Matthew's Lutheran Church in New York City, was even more conservative than the Steimle Synod and became antagonistic toward the Ministerium. These congregations and pastors withdrew from the Ministerium, with most eventually joining the Missouri Synod; St. Matthew's did so in 1885.

In 1888, the Ministerium gained control of Wagner College, which had been founded in 1883 to prepare boys for seminary training. The school, at that time in Rochester, New York, offered six years of instruction (high school and junior college) emphasizing languages. Besides Greek and Latin, students were expected to be fluent in both English and German, which was important because of the influx of German immigrants. By the latter part of the 19th century, the Ministerium had become predominately German-speaking. The relatively few English-speaking congregations were given permission to form an English conference within the Ministerium, but in 1902, these left to form the Synod of New York and New England.

The Ministerium, along with the Synod of New York and the Synod of New York and New England, became members of the United Lutheran Church in America (ULCA) in 1917 when that body was formed by the merger of the General Synod, the General Council, and the United Synod of the South. The three New York bodies themselves merged in 1929 to form the United Lutheran Synod of New York; that body was renamed as the United Lutheran Synod of New York and New England in 1952, when the New Jersey congregations in it joined the separate New Jersey Synod.

When the ULCA became part of the Lutheran Church in America (LCA) in 1962, the New England congregations were transferred to the LCA's newly created New England Synod. When the LCA merged into the Evangelical Lutheran Church in America (ELCA) in 1988, the congregations in New York were assigned to the appropriate ELCA synod, depending on the location: Metropolitan New York Synod, the Upstate New York Synod, or the New England Synod.
