= Helen Knubel =

American archivist (1901–1992)

- Helen Knubel, from a 1958 publication
- Born: July 10, 1901; New York City, US
- Died: July 23, 1992 (aged 91); Bronxville, New York, US
- Occupation: Archivist
- Parent: Frederick Hermann Knubel

Helen M. Knubel (July 10, 1901 – July 23, 1992) was an American archivist for the National Lutheran Council from 1954 to 1971.

== Early life ==
Helen M. Knubel was born in New York City, the daughter of Frederick Hermann Knubel and Christine A. Ritscher Knubel. Her father was president of the United Lutheran Church in America from 1918 to 1944. Her brother, Frederick R. Knubel, was head of the United Lutheran Synod of New York and New England.

Knubel survived polio as a teenager, and used a wheelchair. She attended The New School for Social Research, the Biblical Seminary of New York, and trained as a librarian at Columbia University.

== Career ==
Knubel worked as an archivist for the National Lutheran Council from 1954 to 1971, and "was considered the foremost archivist of the history of the Lutheran Church in North America," noted her obituary in The New York Times. She was founder and director of the Oral History of Cooperative Lutheranism in America project. She was the author of An Introductory Guide to Lutheran Archives (1981), and The Oral History Collection of the Archives of Cooperative Lutheranism (1984 and 1987, with Alice M. Kendrick). She was also editor of the annual Lutheran Church Directory for the United States and Canada.

Knubel had a scholarly interest in early American book illustration. She wrote "Alexander Anderson and Early American Book Illustration" (Princeton University Library Chronicle, 1940), and owned fourteen of Anderson's original printing blocks.

== Personal life ==
Helen Knubel died in 1992 in a hospital in Bronxville, New York, aged 91 years. Her grave is in Brooklyn's Green-Wood Cemetery. The Helen M. Knubel Archives of Cooperative Lutheranism are housed at the ELCA Archives in Elk Grove Village, Illinois.
