= Common Service Book =

Worship book and hymnal used by several Lutheran denominations in North America

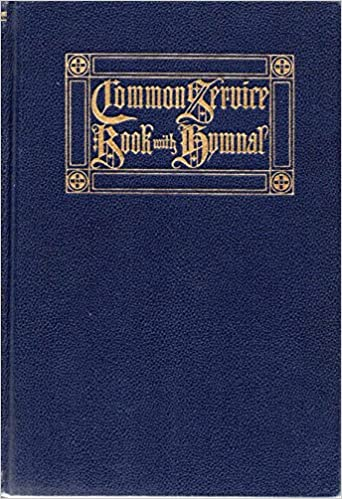
- 1918 edition of the Common Service Book with Hymnal
- Released: 1917 (text only), 1918 (with music)
- Publisher: United Lutheran Church in America
	Service Book and Hymnal →

The Common Service Book (CSB) is a worship book and hymnal originally issued jointly by the Evangelical Lutheran General Synod of the United States of America, the General Council of the Evangelical Lutheran Church in North America, and the United Synod of the Evangelical Lutheran Church in the South in 1917, and, after the merger of those bodies into the United Lutheran Church in America (ULCA) in 1918, by that body.

The hymnal employed the Common Service of 1887, the first common liturgy for the Divine Service among English-speaking Lutherans in the United States and Canada. The work of the inter-Lutheran committee that produced the Common Service and the hymnal itself was instrumental in bringing about the formation the ULCA.

The text only edition, first published in 1917, did not contain the music for the hymns; the hymnal edition, first published in 1918, included the music. The Occasional Services section was also published separately.
