= AELC =

AELC may refer to:

- American Evangelical Lutheran Church, a predecessor church of the Lutheran Church in America, US
- Andhra Evangelical Lutheran Church, India
- Associació d'Escriptors en Llengua Catalana, Association of Catalan Language Writers, a non-profit professional organisation, Spain
- Association of Evangelical Lutheran Churches, a predecessor church body of the Evangelical Lutheran Church in America, US
