= Immanuel Lutheran College (North Carolina) =

Former Black college in Greensboro, North Carolina

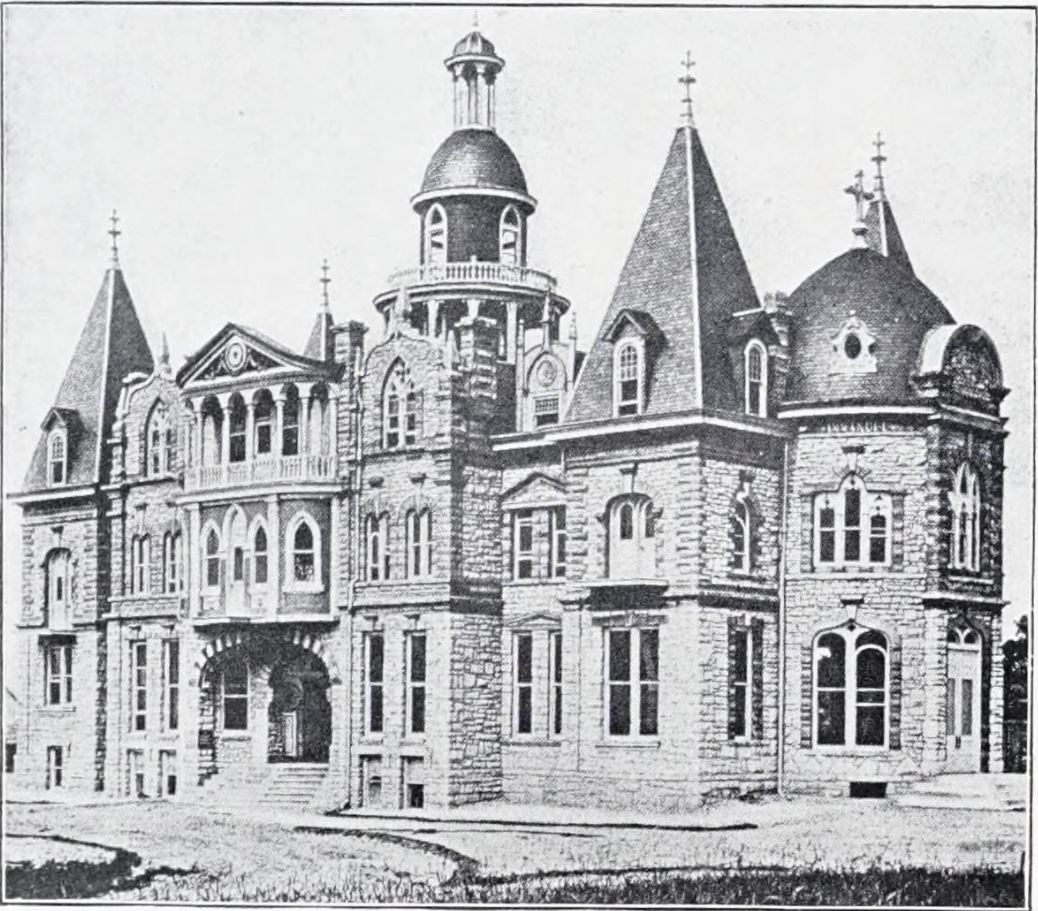
- The Administration Building, c. 1910
- Type: Private high school, junior college, and seminary
- Active: 1903–1961
- Religious affiliation: Evangelical Lutheran Synodical Conference of North America
- Location: Greensboro, North Carolina, United States; 36°4′23.1″N 79°46′12.5″W

Immanuel Lutheran College was an educational institution of the Evangelical Lutheran Synodical Conference of North America whose main purpose was to train Black men to be pastors and both men and women to be teachers. It was founded in Concord, North Carolina, in 1903 and relocated to Greensboro, North Carolina, in 1905. The college was closed in 1961 when the Synodical Conference decided that the training of Blacks should be integrated into the educational institutions of the Lutheran Church–Missouri Synod (LCMS), the largest member of the conference. The former campus was purchased by North Carolina A&T State University.

== History ==
=== Background ===
North Carolina was home to a number of Black Lutherans prior to the Civil War due to Lutheran plantation owners taking their slaves to church services where they were baptized, instructed, and confirmed. In 1888, the North Carolina Synod appointed four Black men (J. W. Koonts, W. Philo Phifer, Samuel Holt, and Nathan Clap) to minister to the Black Lutherans in the state. These four men, together with some laymen, established the Alpha Synod of the Evangelical Lutheran Church of Freedom in America in 1890, with Koonts as the president. Koonts, however, died the same year. In 1891, Phifer wrote to Heinrich Christian Schwan, the president of the LCMS, for assistance. Schwan forwarded the letter to the Mission Board of the Synodical Conference which, after an investigation, sent Nils J. Bakke as a missionary to oversee the remaining three pastors of the now-defunct Alpha Synod.

John C. Schmidt, whom Bakke had ordained as a missionary in 1894, started a Black congregation eventually named Evangelical Lutheran Grace Church in the southwest part of Greensboro. Between 1896 and 1902 he sent 11 Black men to Concordia Theological Seminary in Springfield, Illinois, but the colder climate, distance from home, expense, and exclusive use of German in the classes discouraged further recruitment and led him and Bakke to advocate for a southern college for Black pastors and teachers.

The Immanuel Conference was established at a February 1900 gathering at Grace Lutheran Church in Concord, North Carolina, of the missionaries and laymen from North Carolina and Virginia involved in the Black mission work. During the conference's first meeting in April of that year, the attendees examined a possible site in Concord and passed a resolution that the Synodical Conference's Mission Board establish a "Theological-Normal-Industrial college" for black people. In 1902, the convention of the Synodical Conference resolved to create one or two such colleges.

=== Establishment ===
On August 12, 1902, the Immanuel Conference petitioned the Mission Board for a preparatory school to be opened temporarily in Concord. However, the school could not be opened in time for the fall semester of that year because the Mission Board could not find anyone to server as the professor. Finally, Bakke agreed to serve, and on March 2, 1903, Immanuel Luther College opened as a seminary for Black men to become Lutheran pastors, using the facilities of the African American Grace Lutheran Church in Concord. The upper level of a two-story building next to the church served as both the dormitory and the classroom, while a two-room cottage behind the church was used as the kitchen and dining hall. The initial enrollment of five young men increased to ten or eleven, ages 14 to 27, by the end of the first year. The second year started with 30 students, increasing to 36 at the start of the spring semester.

The need for Black women to serve as teachers in the elementary schools attached to the various Black Lutheran congregations in Virginia and North Carolina led to an appeal for girls to enroll. The response was gratifying, but the additional students made it clear that a new facility was needed. A 13-acre (5.3 ha) site in northeast Greensboro near North Carolina A&T college was donated by Garland Daniel, and a contract with A. L. Schlosser to erect the Administration Building on the new campus was signed on June 13, 1904. The cornerstone was laid on September 15, 1905. The college relocated in July 1905 when construction was beginning, and two nearby houses were rented for students to sleep and eat in until the Administration Building, which would also serve as the men's dormitory, was completed in 1907 Schmidt, the pastor of Evangelical Lutheran Grace Church in Greensboro, supervised the construction. The final cost of $28,000 was twice as much as had been budgeted. Some of the extra cost was due to higher than expected labor and material costs, but most of it was due to the building being larger than originally planned. The overrun caused budget problems for the Synodical Conference's mission efforts for several years. As originally constructed, the exterior of the building was an "exotic structure blending many architectural elements", but it was later remodeled as "a basic stone building".

=== Later years ===
Over the years, several additional buildings were erected, including a girls' dormitory, a high school science building, a dining hall and kitchen, and several faculty residences. However, the facilities were not really adequate. In 1920, there were four professors and only two faculty residences, so one of professors and his family had to live off campus, while two of the professors and their families had to share a seven-room house. When Henry Nau became president in 1925, he reported that the Administration Building had been the subject of a government survey that found that "The building is a two-story granite structure of an inconsistent mixed and wasteful type of architecture. It is heated by stoves. The interior shows poor workmanship, inexperienced planning, and poor material." It was "a building which is an excellent example of how not to build a school building". At that time the girls dormitory was in such poor condition that the Greensboro Health Department had condemned it, although the school continued to use it. Moreover, none of the roads on the campus had been paved

Originally, the college had three departments: a four-year high school, a one-year normal school for training teachers, and a three-year theological seminary. The institution eventually offered an accredited four-year high school program, an accredited junior college program, and a four-year theological seminary program. However, even as early as 1918, the Mission Board had considered limiting enrollment to those students who intended to be Lutheran pastors or teachers. In March 1932, the Mission Board resolved to make a similar resolution to the next Synodical Conference convention. In June of that year, the Immanuel Conference, echoing the faculty's position, petitioned the convention to make no changes, noting that restricting the number of students would require faculty reductions that would make it impossible to provide proper preparation of the pastors and teachers. No further action was taken at that time.

At the September 1935 meeting of the Mission Board, the Executive Secretary of Missions of the LCMS proposed that the seminary department of Immanuel College be transferred to Concordia Theological Seminary in Springfield, Illinois. While Concordia's faculty was in favor, the president of Immanuel and the Immanuel Conference opposed the move. The proposal was dropped in late 1937 when the LCMS Board of Directors advised against admitting Black students to LCMS colleges.

=== Closure ===
By 1955, total enrollment was averaging 100 students (about what it had been in 1920), with about 30 graduates a year from the high school, junior college, and seminary combined. A new combination men's dormitory and gymnasium was opened in 1956, leading many in the college community to believe that the school would be around for many years. Most of the Black Lutheran pastors in the South were graduates of the seminary. However, despite efforts to increase enrollment, total enrollment for the 1959–1960 school year had fallen to 72, most of whom were non-Lutheran.

The Synodical Conference, at its convention in August 1960, voted to close the school after the 1960–1961 school year. Several of the recent graduates of the junior college had already decided to pursue their seminary training at one of the mostly-white seminaries of the member synods of the conference rather than continuing at Immanuel, lessening the need for a school designed specifically to train Black pastors. It was anticipated that future undergraduate students in both the teacher education and the pre-seminary programs would attend Alabama Lutheran Academy and College (the other Black college supported by the Synodical Conference) or one of the colleges run by the member synods Immanuel closed on June 30, 1961, and its records were transferred to the Alabama college.

The state of North Carolina purchased the campus for $239,000 and it eventually became the East Campus of North Carolina A&T State University. The only remaining Immanuel building is the combination men's dormitory and gym, A&T having since demolished all the others, including the Administration Building.

== Presidents ==
- Nils J. Bakke (1903–1910)
- Frederick Berg (8 years between 1911 and 1925)
- Henry Nau (1925–1950)
- William H. Kampschmidt (1951–1961)

== Notable people ==
- James E. Cheek – president of Howard University, 1950 graduate of the high school department
- Greg Morris – actor, attended the high school department

== See also ==
- Luther College (Louisiana), a school for Blacks in New Orleans also established by the Synodical Conference
