= Luther College (Louisiana) =

- New Orleans; Louisiana; United States

Information
- School type: Historically black secondary school, normal school, and seminary
- Religious affiliation: Evangelical Lutheran Synodical Conference of North America
- Established: 1903
- Closed: 1925
- Gender: Co-ed

Luther College was a private black school in New Orleans, Louisiana, United States. It was established by the Evangelical Lutheran Synodical Conference of North America in 1903 as part of the conference's missionary work among African Americans in the Southern United States following the American Civil War. The school was founded the same year as Immanuel Lutheran College in Concord, North Carolina, and both schools had the same three departments: a secondary school, a normal school, and a seminary.

In 1910, the school closed its seminary, having graduated only one student in that department. In 1925, the conference closed the college, citing the lack of its seminary and the high estimated cost required for new school buildings. Funds for the college were diverted to the Alabama Lutheran College in Selma, Alabama, which had been established in 1922.

== History ==
Following the American Civil War, the Evangelical Lutheran Synodical Conference of North America began to support missionary work directed towards the African American community in the southern United States. As part of this outreach, the conference founded several schools and colleges throughout the region. In 1903, the conference founded Immanuel Lutheran College in Concord, North Carolina, and later that year, the conference founded Luther College in New Orleans. Luther College officially opened in September 1903 in the 10-foot (3.0 m) by 20-foot (6.1 m) vestry of St. Paul's Church, under the leadership of the Reverend F. J. Lankenau. While classes were initially held inside the church, a school building was erected in 1904. The building, located adjacent to St. Paul's, was dedicated in November of that year and cost $4,007. (Note: Sources differ on the exact date, with sources differing between November 4 and November 6.) Lankenau was assisted in his instructions by two assistants, the Reverends K. Kretzschmar and J. Kossmann. The school was modeled after the North Carolina institute, and like that school, it operated three departments: a high school, a normal school, and a seminary. In 1904, the school had 25 students, with two students in the seminary. Additionally, St. Paul's operated a parochial school that had an enrollment of over 200 students.

A 1908 directory of colleges and private schools in the United States listed Luther College as a co-ed institution that offered preparatory and college classes. That year, the school had 14 male and 9 female students, ranging in age from 13 to 24 years old, being taught by three white male teachers, with six students studying for the Christian ministry. In September 1908, Lankenau departed from New Orleans, with his duties as both president of Luther College and minister of St. Paul's being taken up by Frederick Wenger. By 1910, the school's property was valued at $6,000 and it had annual expenses of $2,500, which were primarily covered by the conference, with additional funding secured by tuition. That same year, the seminary closed, having graduated only one student, Clavin Peter Thompson, during its existence.

In February 1914, the school was visited by members of the United States Office of Education as part of a nationwide study on African American education. At the time, the school was headed by President R. E. Schmidt and had a staff of two teachers, all white men. The school had an enrollment of 37 students and offered ten grades, with sewing classes offered to students above the seventh grade. The office reported that most of the students were in the elementary grades. For the 1913–1914 financial year, the school had an income of $1,400, of which $1,300 came from the conference and the remainder from tuition. The property value was estimated at $10,500, including the land lot, two-story building, and various pieces of equipment. According to the office's report, they recommended that the school should raise its attendance and offer industrial education for its male students. Additionally, they recommended that several Lutheran parochial schools in the city should divert their income to the college "to make it a first-class secondary school".

In 1922, the conference opened the Alabama Lutheran College in Selma, Alabama, which had been a mission field of focus for the Lutherans. Several years later, in 1925, the conference closed Luther College, with the funds that had been going towards that school redirected to the Alabama institute. A 1927 book published by the conference cited two main reasons for the closure of Luther College: the lack of the seminary and the estimated $18,500 that would have been required for the construction of new buildings for the school.

== Sources ==
- Armentrout, Donald S. (2005). "Lutheran Church". In Hill, Samuel S.; Lippy, Charles H.; Wilson, Charles Reagan (eds.). Encyclopedia of Religion in the South (2nd ed.). Macon, Georgia: Mercer University Press. pp. 472–474. ISBN 978-0-86554-758-2.
- Drewes, Christopher F. (1927). Half a Century of Lutheranism Among Our Colored People: A Jubilee Book. St. Louis: Concordia Publishing House.
- Hartshorn, W. N.; Penniman, George W., eds. (1910). An Era of Progress and Promise, 1863–1910: The Religious, Moral, and Educational Development of the American Negro Since His Emancipation. Boston: The Priscilla Publishing Company. LCCN 10009507. OCLC 5343815.
- Mitchell, Henry H. (2004). Black Church Beginnings: The Long-Hidden Realities of the First Years. Grand Rapids, Michigan: William B. Eerdmans Publishing Company. ISBN 978-0-8028-2785-2.
- Murphy, Larry G.; Melton, J. Gordon; Ward, Gary L., eds. (2011). Encyclopedia of African American Religions. Routledge. ISBN 978-1-135-51338-2.
- Myers, Harry J., ed. (1908). American College and Private School Directory. Vol. II. Educational Aid Society.
- Negro Education: A Study of the Private and Higher Schools for Colored People in the United States. Vol. II. United States Office of Education. Washington, D.C.: United States Government Printing Office. 1917.
