= Evangelical Lutheran Synod of Illinois =

Lutheran synod

- Abbreviation: Illinois Synod
- Classification: Protestant
- Orientation: Lutheran
- Theology: Confessional Lutheran
- Associations: General Synod (1848–1866); General Council (1867–1871); Synodical Conference (1872–1880)
- Region: Illinois and Missouri
- Origin: June 1846; Hillsboro, Illinois
- Separated from: Evangelical Synod of the West
- Separations: Evangelical Lutheran Synod of Central Illinois (1867)
- Merged into: Lutheran Church–Missouri Synod (1880)
- Congregations: 26 (1880)
- Members: 6,004 (1880)
- Ministers: 23 (1880)

The Evangelical Lutheran Synod of Illinois, often referred to as the Illinois Synod, was created in June 1846 when the Evangelical Synod of the West divided due to growth. It held its first convention in Hillsboro, Illinois, on October 15, 1846.

The Illinois Synod joined the Evangelical Lutheran General Synod of the United States of America in 1848. Disagreements within the General Synod as to the binding character of the Lutheran Confessions caused a split, with the Illinois Synod joining with several other Lutheran synods to form the new General Council of the Evangelical Lutheran Church in North America in 1867. However, in a meeting in Mount Pulaski, Illinois, in August 1867, a minority of pastors and congregations of the Illinois Synod who wanted to remain in the General Synod withdrew from the synod and formed the Evangelical Lutheran Synod of Central Illinois.

In 1871, the Illinois Synod withdrew from the General Council due to the issue of the Four Points regarding the permissible forms of association with non-Lutheran churches and organizations. It then joined with other confessional Lutheran synods that either had withdrawn from the General Council or had declined to join it to establish the Evangelical Lutheran Synodical Conference of North America in 1872. At some point the Illinois Synod expanded its name to the Evangelical Lutheran Synod of Illinois and Other States as congregations in Missouri joined it.

In the early years of the Synodical Conference, there was an effort to create unified synods for each state. The 1878 convention of the Synodical Conference voted in favor of establishing state synods. These state synods were to organize into two or three larger synods, one for the east (corresponding to the Ohio Synod), one for the southwest (corresponding to the Missouri Synod), and one for the northwest (which would include all congregations in Michigan, Wisconsin, Minnesota, the Dakotas, and all parts west). This formed three larger synods, which solved the longstanding concern that if either the Missouri or Ohio synods were allowed to keep their identity, they would dominate the rest of the Synodical Conference, or, even worse, the Minnesota or Wisconsin Synods would be forced to join one of them. This new organization did not apply to congregations speaking Norwegian, and English speaking congregations were to organize as separate district synods within one of the three larger synods

In summary, all of the other synods which withdrew from the General Council to join the Synodical Conference ended in up the multi-state body currently known as the Wisconsin Synod following the geographical decisions of the convention that the synods located in Michigan, Wisconsin, Minnesota, the Dakotas and all parts west were to be free from the larger, multi-state Missouri and Ohio synods. But the Illinois Synod was an exception because it was located in the area assigned to the multi-state Missouri Synod.

To that end, in May 1880, the Illinois Synod merged with the Illinois District of the Lutheran Church–Missouri Synod, while urging its congregations in Missouri to join the Missouri Synod's Western District. At the time of the merger, the Illinois Synod had 26 congregations, 23 pastors, and 6,004 communicant members.
