= Frankean Synod =

Defunct Lutheran synod in the United States

The Franckean Synod was a Lutheran church body in North America in the 19th century.

The Synod was formed by Lutheran pastors in New York who were dissatisfied with their church's position on slavery in 1837. The Synod was named in memory of the Pietist leader of the Foundation at the University of Halle, August Hermann Francke.

The Franckean Synod was noted for its socially progressive views: it was strongly abolitionist, pro-temperance, and pacifist. The Franckean Synod also ordained the first black Lutheran pastor, Daniel Payne, who later became a bishop of the African Methodist Episcopal Church and the president of Wilberforce University.

The Synod also was known for its indifference to the Lutheran Confessions, and lack of emphasis on Lutheran identity. It was the admission of the Franckean Synod into the General Synod in 1864 that caused the Pennsylvania Ministerium to withdraw from that organization and form the General Council.

Along with the other churches of the General Synod, the Franckean Synod ceased to exist when the General Synod, General Council, and the General Synod-South merged to form the United Lutheran Church in America, a predecessor of the Evangelical Lutheran Church in America.

== Sources ==
- Wolf, Edmund Jacob. The Lutherans in America; a story of struggle, progress, influence and marvelous growth (New York: J.A. Hill. 1889)
- Bente, F. American Lutheranism Volume II (St. Louis: Concordia Publishing House. 1919)
- Nichol, Todd W. All These Lutherans (Minneapolis: Augsburg Publishers. 1986)
