= Synod of Evangelical Lutheran Churches =

American Lutheran denomination (1902–1971)

- Abbreviation: SELC
- Classification: Lutheran
- Orientation: Confessional Lutheranism
- Polity: Congregational
- Region: Northeastern and Midwestern United States
- Origin: 1902; Connellsville, Pennsylvania
- Merged into: Lutheran Church – Missouri Synod (1971)
- Congregations: 65 (1964)
- Members: 21,656 (1964)
- Ministers: 63 (1964)
- Other name(s): Slovak Evangelical Lutheran Church of the Augsburg Confession in the United States of America (1902–1913); Slovak Evangelical Lutheran Synod of the United States of America (1913–1945); Slovak Evangelical Lutheran Church (1945–1959)

The Synod of Evangelical Lutheran Churches (SELC) was an American Lutheran denomination that existed from 1902 to 1971. It merged with the Lutheran Church – Missouri Synod (LCMS) in 1971 and now operates as the non-geographic SELC District of that body.

== History ==
In 1894, Slovak Lutheran immigrants in Pennsylvania formed a short-lived synod. Three conferences that stressed confessional Lutheran identity were later held in Wilkes-Barre (1899) and Braddock, Pennsylvania (1900 and 1902). As a result of these conferences, the denomination was founded at St. Peter's Church in Connellsville, Pennsylvania, on September 2–4, 1902, as the Slovak Evangelical Lutheran Church of the Augsburg Confession in the United States of America (Slovenská evanjelická celocirkev augsburgského vyznania v Spojenych štátoch amerických). At its origin, the denomination had ten clergymen and 15 congregations. Most congregations were composed of recent immigrants, and liturgies were usually conducted in Slovak. Those Slovak Lutherans who did not join the SELC eventually formed the Slovak Zion Synod in 1919, which is now part of the Evangelical Lutheran Church in America.

The SELC's name was changed in 1913 to Slovak Evangelical Lutheran Synod of the United States of America. In 1945, the name was shortened to Slovak Evangelical Lutheran Church. By 1959, the use of Slovak as a primary liturgical language had died out and the denomination was renamed the Synod of Evangelical Lutheran Churches, thereby retaining SELC as its acronym.

The SELC entered into altar and pulpit fellowship with the LCMS in 1903. It joined the Evangelical Lutheran Synodical Conference of North America in 1910, and was one of the two remaining members of that federation (the LCMS being the other) when it was dissolved in 1967. The SELC was a founding member of the Lutheran Council in the United States of America, which began operations on January 1, 1967.

In 1971, during its convention held at Zion Lutheran Church in Clark, New Jersey, the SELC officially merged with the LCMS, becoming the SELC District, one of two non-geographic districts of the LCMS. The district retained the initials "SELC" in its name to mark its origins and heritage.

The SELC had publications in both Slovak (Svekok - Witness and Mlady Luteran - Young Lutheran) and English (Lutheran Beacon). Its original hymnal was the Slovak language Tranoscius, which contained over 900 hymns; it later began using The Lutheran Hymnal as English was adopted in its worship.

In 1937, Andrew Duda Sr, one of a group of Slovaks who had moved to the Slavia area of Florida (now part of Oviedo), gave 40 acres (16 ha) and $90,000 to the SELC to open a home for the elderly and for needy children. Lutheran Haven officially opened on May 30, 1948. The dependent children unit was eventually discontinued, but the retirement home remains in operation.

As of 2021, the SELC District had 52 congregations in 11 U.S. states and 2 Canadian provinces and had 13,876 baptized members and 11,239 communicants. The district's congregations are concentrated in the Northeastern and Midwestern United States.

== Presidents of SELC ==
The SELC had ten presidents during its existence as an independent synod.

- Daniel Jonaten Záboj Laucek 1902–1905
- John Pelikán 1905–1913
- Stephen Tuhy 1913–1919
- J. Pelikán 1919–1921
- John Somora 1921–1922
- John Samuel Bradác 1922–1939
- Andrew Daniel 1939–1949
- Paul Rafaj 1949–1963
- John Kovac 1963–1969
- Milan A. Ontko 1969–1971

== Membership statistics ==
SELC Membership Statistics
Year	Pastors	Congregations	Members
1925	31	59	6,534
1929	36	60	8,206
1935	39	55	16,500
1939	-	63	22,458
1942	-	61	22,424
1943	-	60	22,186
1946	-	56	20,866
1949	-	64	21,211
1950	58	59	18,870
1951	54	59	20,244
1952	7	59	20,562
1955	49	58	16,474
1957	58	59	18,003
1958	56	59	19,931
1960	59	54	8,531
1961	57	50	19,802
1962	57	53	19,184
1964	63	65	21,656
