= Rosa Young =

American educator (1890–1971)

Rosa Jinsey Young
- Born: May 14, 1890; Rosebud, Alabama, U.S.
- Died: June 30, 1971 (aged 81)
- Burial place: Near Christ Lutheran Church in Rosebud, Alabama
- Education: Daniel Payne College
- Occupation: Lutheran educator
- Known for: Founder of Concordia College Alabama
- Notable work: A Light In the Dark Belt
- Parent(s): Grant and Nancy Young
- Awards: LL.D. (Concordia Theological Seminary)

Rosa Jinsey Young (May 14, 1890 – June 30, 1971) was an African American Lutheran educator who worked primarily in the Black Belt of Alabama. Born in Rosebud, Alabama, to Grant, an African Methodist Episcopal pastor, and Nancy Young, Rosa Young was the valedictorian of her 1909 graduating class at Daniel Payne College in Selma, Alabama. She founded her first school, Rosebud Literary and Industrial School, in 1912. Within two years, attendance at her school grew from 7 to 215.

In 1914, the cotton boll weevil infested Wilcox County, and the resulting economic hardship meant that students' families were unable to afford the tuition. Desperate to keep the school open, she requested aid from the Methodist Church, but to no avail. She wrote to Booker T. Washington at the Tuskegee Institute, and he suggested she contact the Evangelical Lutheran Synodical Conference of North America (of which the Lutheran Church–Missouri Synod was the largest member) for assistance. Upon receiving her letter dated October 27, 1915, the conference's Mission Board sent Nils Bakke to Rosebud in January 1916 to investigate. They agreed to support the school and pay Young $20 per month to teach. Young herself became the first black Lutheran convert in Alabama, and a congregation, Christ Lutheran Church, was soon established. On Palm Sunday in 1916, 58 people were baptized and 70 were confirmed.

Word of the school and resulting Lutheran church in Rosebud spread among the African-American communities in Alabama and neighboring states, with requests being made to the Synodical Conference to start additional schools and churches. By 1927, there were 27 congregations with their associated schools. Altogether, Young helped establish 30 schools and 35 churches in Alabama. The number of congregations peaked in the 1930s, and the Great Migration led to the decline of rural communities generally and Lutheran churches in particular. The exodus of African-American Lutherans from Alabama seeded Lutheran congregations across the country. In 1977, 35 African-American pastors in the LCMS could trace their roots to the Alabama Field.

In 1922, Young helped establish Alabama Lutheran Academy and College in Selma. Later called Concordia College Alabama, Young served as a professor there from 1946 to 1961. Concordia operated until 2018.

Young's autobiography, A Light in the Dark Belt, was published in 1930 and republished in 1950. She received an honorary doctorate from Concordia Theological Seminary in 1961.
