= Frederick Hermann Knubel =

American Lutheran clergyman

- Born: May 22, 1870; New York City
- Died: October 16, 1945 (aged 75)
- Known for: first president of the United Lutheran Church in America

Frederick Hermann Knubel (May 22, 1870 – October 16, 1945) was a U.S. Lutheran clergyman and first president of the United Lutheran Church in America from 1918 to October 1944.

Knubel was born in New York City to Friedrich (Frederick) C. Knubel (1827-1908), a German-born grocer who had immigrated in 1855, and his wife, Katherine.

He was educated in Gettysburg, Pennsylvania and at the Theologisches Seminar and University of Leipzig.

He was a pastor in New York from 1896 to 1918.

On July 2, 1924, he offered the invocation at the opening of the twelfth session of the 1924 Democratic National Convention. His daughter Helen Knubel was a longtime archivist for the National Lutheran Council.

== Works ==
- Our church; an official study book (1924)
- Church unity; a commentary on the Epistle to the Ephesians (1937)
