= Gottlob Frederick Krotel =

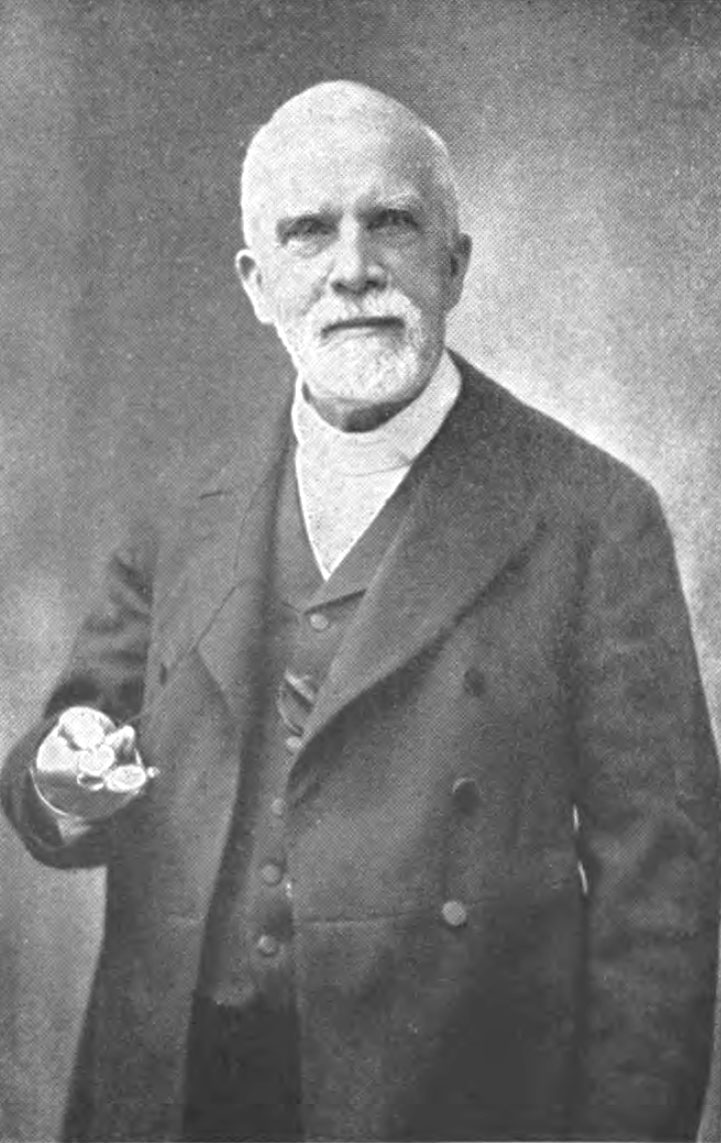

Gottlob Frederick Krotel (born in Ilsfeld, Duchy of Württemberg, 4 February 1826; died 17 May 1907) was a Lutheran clergyman of the United States.

== Biography ==
He came to the United States when quite young, settled in Philadelphia, and graduated from the University of Pennsylvania in 1846. He then studied theology, was licensed to preach in 1848, and was ordained to the ministry in the Lutheran church in 1850. He was pastor of Lutheran congregations at Lebanon, Pennsylvania, 1849–53; Lancaster, 1853–62; and Philadelphia in 1862-68; and after 1868 had charge of the English-language Evangelical Lutheran Church of the Holy Trinity, New York City, which he organized.

At the establishment of the Lutheran Theological Seminary at Philadelphia, in 1864, he was elected one of the professors, a post which he filled until he moved to New York. He held many offices in his church, and was president of its General Council in 1870. He received the degree of D.D. from the University of Pennsylvania in 1865.

== Literary work ==
Krotel was for several years editor of the Lutherische Herald, New York, and for many years of The Lutheran, Philadelphia. Among his published works are:

- Ledderhose, Life of Melanchthon, translator from the German (Philadelphia, 1854)
- Who are the Blessed? A Meditation on the Beatitudes (1855)
- Memorial Volume of Trinity Church, Lancaster (Lancaster, Pa., 1861)
- Explanations of Luther's Small Catechism, with William J. Mann (Philadelphia, 1863)
- Gerhard Uhlhorn, “Luther and the Swiss,” a lecture, translator from the German (1878)
