= National Lutheran Council =

Cooperative agency of Lutheran church bodies

- Abbreviation: NLC
- Classification: Christian
- Orientation: Protestant
- Theology: Lutheran
- Structure: Association
- Region: United States
- Origin: 1918; Chicago, Illinois, U.S.
- Defunct: 1966

The National Lutheran Council (NLC) was a cooperative agency of most of the Lutheran church bodies in the United States. It was established in 1918 and was replaced in 1966 by the Lutheran Council in the United States of America.

== History ==
The celebration of the 400th anniversary of the Lutheran Reformation in 1917 led to the creation of the National Lutheran Commission for Soldiers' and Sailors' Welfare in October of that year, and the Lutheran Bureau (for publicity) in November. On July 17, 1918, the Executive Committee of the welfare commission, consisting of 15 members from the various Lutheran bodies, met in Harrisburg, Pennsylvania, and created an eight-member committee to plan for a national council. The planning committee then met in Pittsburgh, Pennsylvania, on August 1, 1918. Finally, the National Lutheran Council was organized on September 6, 1918, in Chicago, Illinois.

There were eight founding members of the NLC:

- The Evangelical Lutheran General Synod of the United States of America (General Synod)
- The General Council of the Evangelical Lutheran Church in North America (General Council)
- The Evangelical Lutheran Joint Synod of Ohio and Other States (Ohio Joint Synod)
- The Evangelical Lutheran Synod of Iowa and Other States (Iowa Synod)
- The Evangelical Lutheran Augustana Synod in North America (Augustana Synod)
- The Norwegian Lutheran Church of America (Norwegian Synod)
- The Lutheran Free Church
- The Danish Evangelical Lutheran Church in America (Danish Church)

The United Synod of the Evangelical Lutheran Church in the South (United Synod South) joined shortly thereafter.

Each church body had one representative on the council for every 100,000 confirmed members or one-third fraction thereof, with the proviso that each church body would have at least one representative.

The NLC originally had no formal constitution other than a list of stated purposes. In 1926 a set of revised regulations was adopted. A formal constitution and bylaws were adopted in 1946 that, as a doctrinal basis, accepted the Bible as the Word of God and the only source, norm, and guide of Christian faith and life, and the Unaltered Augsburg Confession and Martin Luther's Catechism as the true exposition and presentation of the doctrine of the Bible.

Soon after the organization of the NLC, the member bodies began a series of mergers. In 1918, the General Synod, General Council, and United Synod South merged to form the United Lutheran Church in America (ULCA). In 1930, the Ohio Joint Synod and the Iowa Synod merged into the first American Lutheran Church, and that body merged with the Norwegian Synod in 1960 to create the second American Lutheran Church (ALC). The Lutheran Free Church subsequently joined the ALC in 1963. Finally, the ULCA, the Danish Church, and the Augustana Synod merged in 1962 to form the Lutheran Church in America. These mergers resulted in the NLC having only two members, and at the end of 1966 it was superseded by the Lutheran Council in the United States of America.

== Functions ==
When founded in 1918, the purposes of the NLC were to coordinate activities and agencies of the member bodies, provide statistical information, engage in publicity and public relations, and provide overseas relief to Lutherans affected by World War I. Those purposes broadened over time. The 1945 constitution and later amendments added such functions as making its member bodies aware of conditions to which they should speak or take action, representing the member bodies to federal and state governments and to other organizations, and to serve as the U.S. National Committee of the Lutheran World Federation, a body (originally named Lutheran World Convention) that it had been instrumental in creating in 1923.
