= Pennsylvania Ministerium =

American Lutheran church body

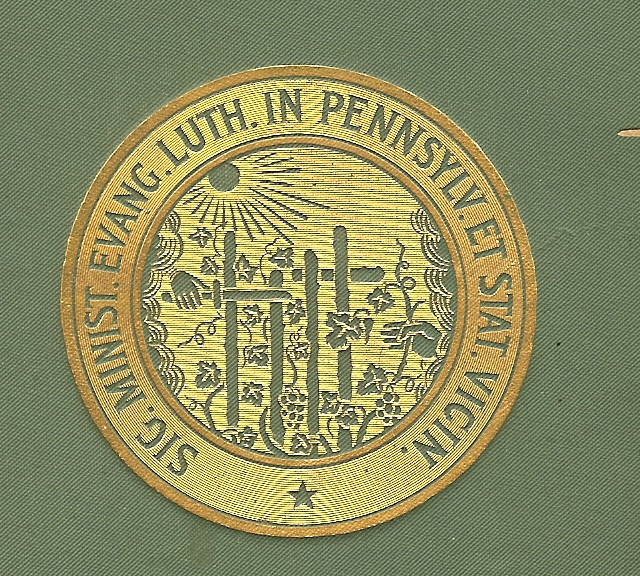
- Seal of the Pennsylvania Ministerium
- Classification: Protestant
- Orientation: Lutheran
- Associations: General Synod (1820–1823; 1853–1864); General Council (1867–1918)
- Region: In and near Pennsylvania
- Founder: Henry Melchior Muhlenberg (1711–1787)
- Origin: August 26, 1748; Philadelphia, Pennsylvania, U.S.
- Merged into: United Lutheran Church in America (1918)
- Other names: German Evangelical Lutheran Ministerium of North America (1748–1792); German Evangelical Lutheran Ministerium of Pennsylvania and Adjacent States (1792–1918)

The Pennsylvania Ministerium was the first Lutheran church body in North America. With the encouragement of Henry Melchior Muhlenberg (1711–1787), the Ministerium was founded at a Church Conference of Lutheran clergy on August 26, 1748. The group was known as the "German Evangelical Lutheran Ministerium of North America" until 1792, when it adopted the name "German Evangelical Lutheran Ministerium of Pennsylvania and Adjacent States".

The Pennsylvania Ministerium, also referred to as the Ministerium of Pennsylvania, was the source of the first Lutheran liturgy in America. Because of its unique place in the history of North American Lutheranism, the Ministerium continued to influence the church politics of Lutherans in America into the 20th century.

== History ==
=== Lutherans in North America ===
In 1638, Swedish settlers, colonizing north along the Delaware River from the New Sweden colony, established residences in what would become Philadelphia, at a place called Wiccaco by the local Lenape tribe, meaning "pleasant place". These Swedish settlers were Lutherans. The Gloria Dei (Old Swedes') Church was completed in 1700. Colonization extended to present-day Trenton.

German settlers began arriving in North America in the mid-17th century. They were particularly attracted by William Penn's promise of religious freedom in what was then the colonial Province of Pennsylvania and came to the Philadelphia region in significant numbers. By 1683, the German population was large enough to form communities such as Germantown, which is now a neighborhood in Philadelphia.

=== Ministerium founding ===
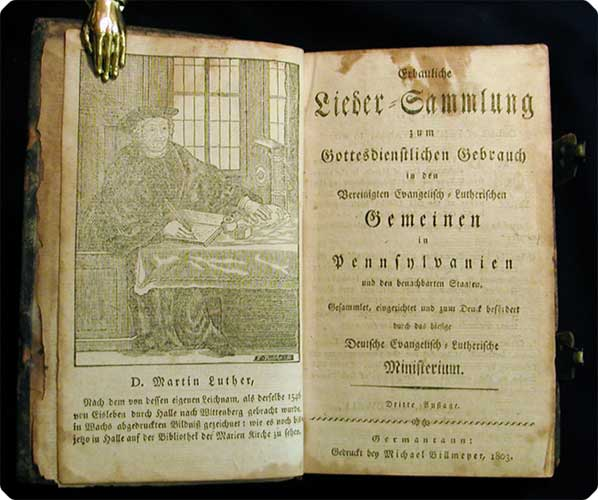
An 1803 hymnal published by the Pennsylvania Ministerium

By the mid-18th century, there was a growing need for well-trained Lutheran clergy in the colonies. A conference was proposed to create a closer union between the area congregations' preachers, elders, and deacons.

The Pietist foundation at the University of Halle in Germany sent 24 clergy members to minister in the colonies in 1742. Among those sent was Henry Melchior Muhlenberg. A tension between pious and orthodox religious interpretations was present in Europe and North American Lutherans. The conference intentionally excluded congregations critical of pious interpretation. A conference was assembled but was disrupted by the orthodox Swedish preacher Rev. Nyburg of the New Sweden colony. Tension around this conference extended beyond Pennsylvania. Open remarks from William C. Berkenmeyer against John C. Hartwick of New York were published in a booklet. His Swedish colleagues in Delaware criticized Carl M. Wrangel for having pietistic leanings.

Five years later, a conference was again assembled. At Muhlenberg's request, Lutheran pastors met in Philadelphia on August 26, 1748, for the first Church Conference. Six pastors and lay representatives from ten congregations attended the meeting, where they agreed to work together as the "ministerium of North America." They successfully adopted a common liturgy to be used in North America. This meeting has become "the most important event in the history of North American Lutheranism". Attendees came from Philadelphia, New Hanover, Providence, Germantown, Tulpehocken, Lancaster, Upper Milford, and Saccum congregations.

The fifteenth Church Conference of 1762, led by Muhlenberg, was held at St Michael's Church, Philadelphia. Four Swedish and ten German preachers represented area congregations.

Muhlenberg's influence went beyond those congregations he served; he organized other Lutheran congregations in Pennsylvania so that they might work in cooperation. Such was his influence that Muhlenberg became regarded to be "the patriarch of the Lutheran church in North America".

The Ministerium remained a relatively informal association until a constitution was drafted and agreed upon in 1781. Along with a formal constitution, it adopted the name of the "German Evangelical Lutheran Ministerium of North America". The churches of the ministerium followed a polity influenced by the Dutch Reformed model and by Muhlenberg's Pietism and did not insist on strict adherence to the Lutheran Confessions. During these early years, there were both German and Swedish pastors in the Ministerium. Members of the Ministerium could be found in Pennsylvania, New York, New Jersey, Maryland, Virginia, and even the Carolinas.

In 1784, Frederick A. Muhlenberg (second son of the earlier patriarch) organized the growing number of Lutheran congregations and clergy in the state of New York into the Ministerium of New York. Mindful of this and other Lutheran church bodies founded in North America, in 1792, the group in Philadelphia renamed itself "The Ministerium of Pennsylvania and Adjacent States".

=== General Synod ===
In 1818, the Pennsylvania Ministerium began talks of organizing the various Lutheran church bodies in America so that they could "stand in some or another in closer connection with one another". At a meeting in Hagerstown, Maryland, in October 1820, the General Synod (formally titled the "Evangelical Lutheran General Synod of the United States of North America") was founded. At the outset, this group consisted of the Pennsylvania Ministerium, along with the New York Ministerium and the Maryland-Virginia Synod.

The General Synod served largely in an advisory function—each church body within the Synod retained its constitution and independence. The primary role of the Synod was to facilitate cooperation among the various church bodies. It was under the auspices of the General Synod, with the leadership of Samuel Simon Schmucker, that a Lutheran seminary and college were founded in Gettysburg, Pennsylvania.

Despite its role in establishing the General Synod, the Pennsylvania Ministerium withdrew from the inter-Lutheran organization in 1823. There was a close relationship within the Ministerium between Lutheran and Reformed congregations, and many felt that the General Synod might jeopardize that relationship. In addition, many in the Ministerium were wary of a centralized organization and the control that it might exert over individual congregations.

The Pennsylvania Ministerium remained an independent Lutheran church body in the years following. However, the Ministerium sought to maintain a relationship with the General Synod, including continuing to send its ministerial students to the General Synod's seminary in Gettysburg.

In the following decades, the Ministerium became less concerned with its relationship with the Reformed church. It saw a significant increase in Lutheran identity and the importance of the Lutheran Confessions. Thus, in 1853, the Ministerium rejoined other Lutherans in the General Synod. However, this renewed relationship would be short-lived.

=== General Council ===
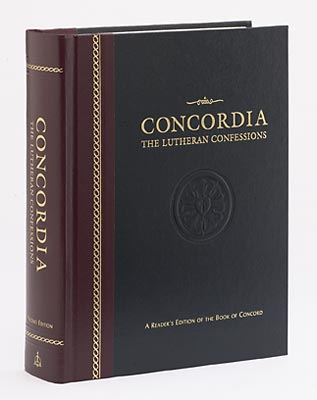
The Book of Concord, which contains the documents known as the "Lutheran Confessions"

As with many Protestant churches, the General Synod was split on the issue of the American Civil War in the 1860s. Yet this was not the biggest challenge to Lutheran unity in the middle of the 19th century. As the importance of the Lutheran Confessions grew among American Lutherans, Samuel Schmucker, who was once seen as confessionally conservative, found himself on the outside of the consensus of other Lutherans. In 1855, Schmucker, along with two other theologians from the Gettysburg seminary, penned the Definite Synodical Platform. This document downplayed the importance of the Confessions, suggesting an edited "American Recension" of the Augsburg Confession, and sought to establish a distinctly American Lutheranism that was more at home with other Protestants in the country.

The Definite Synodical Platform was not enough to cause the Pennsylvania Ministerium to leave the General Synod, but it was a foretaste of things to come. When the Frankean Synod, a Lutheran church body noted for its progressive politics and utter disregard for the Lutheran Confessions, was admitted to the General Synod, the leadership of the Ministerium had seen enough. At the 1864 gathering of the General Synod, at which the Frankeans were admitted, the delegates from the Ministerium left in protest. The General Synod later passed a resolution affirming and strengthening their commitment to the Augsburg Confession.

It is unclear whether the Ministerium members intended this to be a permanent break or a temporary protest, but it became permanent when the officials at the next Gathering of the General Synod refused to admit delegates from the Ministerium. The Ministerium then found itself on its own.

In 1864, unhappy with the direction of the General Synod and its seminary at Gettysburg, the Ministerium established a new seminary in Philadelphia, later known as the Lutheran Theological Seminary at Philadelphia, and asked Charles Porterfield Krauth to head it. This was followed, in 1867, with the Ministerium being joined by 13 other church bodies in a more conservative and confessional organization known as the General Council.

=== United Lutheran Church in America ===
The Pennsylvania Ministerium remained a constituent church of the General Council from 1867 to 1917. In 1918, following the celebration of the 400th anniversary of the Reformation, the three Lutheran church bodies of eastern America (the General Synod, the United Synod of the South, and the General Council) reunited to form the United Lutheran Church in America. This event, while marking a watershed of unity among American Lutherans, also marked the end of the Pennsylvania Ministerium. The ULCA would later join with other American Lutherans to form the Lutheran Church in America in 1962; that body, in turn, helped form the Evangelical Lutheran Church in America in 1988.
