= Rosebud, Alabama =

Unincorporated community in Alabama, United States

Rosebud
- Unincorporated community
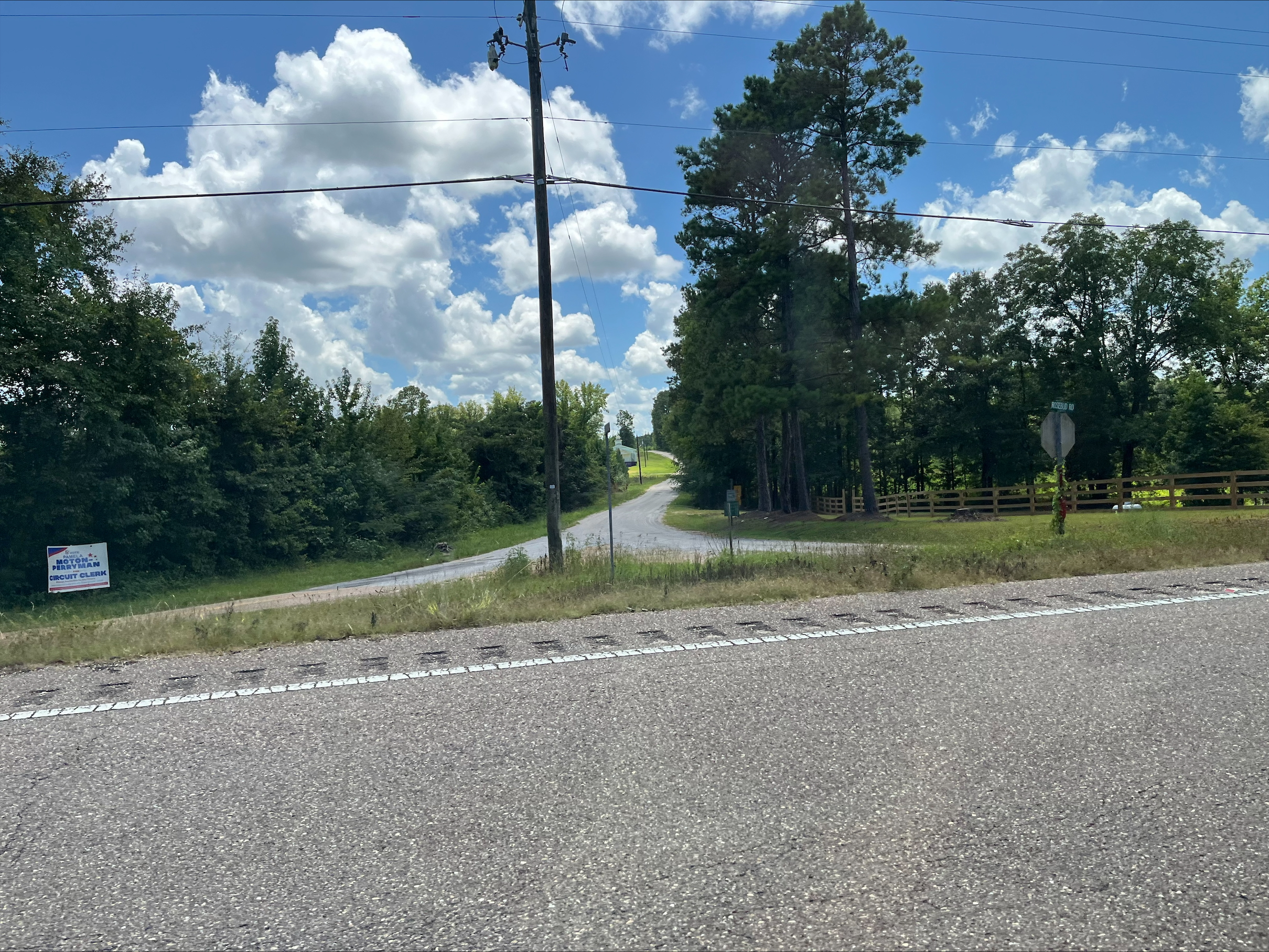
- Intersection of Rosebud Road and Alabama State Route 10 in Rosebud

- Location within the state of Alabama
- Coordinates: 31°56′29″N 87°8′13″W
- Country: United States
- State: Alabama
- County: Wilcox
- Elevation: 253 ft (77 m)
- Time zone: UTC-5 (Eastern (EST))
  - Summer (DST): UTC-4 (EDT)
- GNIS feature ID: 125940

Rosebud is an unincorporated community located in Wilcox County, Alabama, United States.

== History ==
The Dulaney AME Church and Cemetery in Rosebud are listed on the Alabama Register of Landmarks and Heritage. The church was constructed in 1914.

The Rosebud Literary and Industrial School was founded in Rosebud in 1912 with the support of the Lutheran Church – Missouri Synod.

A post office operated under the name Rosebud from 1876 to 1910.

== Notable person ==
- Rosa Young, educator
