= Lutheran Council in the United States of America =

American Lutheran organization

- Abbreviation: LCUSA
- Classification: Christian
- Orientation: Protestant
- Theology: Lutheran
- Structure: Association
- Region: United States
- Origin: 1967
- Defunct: 1988

The Lutheran Council in the United States of America, often referred to as LCUSA, was an ecumenical organization of American Lutherans that existed from 1967 to 1988. It succeeded the National Lutheran Council, whose eight member churches had been reduced to two due to the mergers forming the American Lutheran Church (ALC) in 1960 and the Lutheran Church in America (LCA) in 1960.

In 1959, the Lutheran Church – Missouri Synod (LCMS) had responded favorably to an invitation to discuss the formation of a new inter-Lutheran organization, with meetings in 1960 and 1961 leading to agreement to form LCUSA. This represented a change in the LCMS's position in that it had previously required full doctrinal agreement to be established before joining an organization like this. It did so only with the agreement that all members of LCUSA participate in doctrinal discussions. As a result, the LCMS and the Synod of Evangelical Lutheran Churches (a small church body already in fellowship with the LCMS that would merge into the LCMS in 1971) joined the ALC and LCA in establishing LCUSA, with operations beginning on January 1, 1967.

The Seminex controversy within the LCMS led to the LCMS taking a more traditional stance toward inter-Lutheran endeavors, and as a result, it withdrew from LCUSA in 1977. The group of congregations that had supported Seminex and left the LCMS formed the Association of Evangelical Lutheran Churches (AELC) in 1976 and subsequently joined LCUSA. The 1988 merger of the ALC, the AELC, and the LCA to form the Evangelical Lutheran Church in America made LCUSA unnecessary and it was dissolved.
