= American Evangelical Lutheran Church =

Defunct Protestant denomination

- Abbreviation: AELC
- Classification: Lutheran
- Associations: National Lutheran Council
- Founder: Adam Dan
- Origin: 1878; Neenah, Wisconsin
- Merged into: Lutheran Church in America (1962)
- Congregations: 76
- Members: 23,808 (1961)
- Ministers: 84
- Other name(s): Danish Evangelical Lutheran Church in America (1878–1954)

The American Evangelical Lutheran Church (AELC) was one of the many denominations formed when Lutherans immigrated to America. Originally known as the Danish Evangelical Lutheran Church in America (DELCA), the predominantly Danish-American church was informally known as "the Danish Church."

In 1872, Grundtvigian pastors and lay people from Denmark formed a Church Mission Society. The Danish Evangelical Lutheran Church in America was started in 1874 and formally organized as a synod in Neenah, Wisconsin, in 1878. The church's official founder was Adam Dan, the grandfather of American historian Henry Steele Commager. A constitution was accepted in 1879, and the AELC name was adopted in 1954.

The AELC established Grand View College and Seminary in 1896.

In 1962, the AELC joined the Lutheran Church in America. In 1961, just before the merger, the AELC had 84 pastors, 76 congregations, and 23,808 members.

== Presidents ==
- J. A. Heiberg 1874–1879
- A. S. Nielsen 1879-1883
- T. Helveg 1883–1885
- A. S. Nielsen 1885–1887
- J. Pedersen 1887–1888
- A. L. J. Söholm 1888–1891
- A. S. Nielsen 1891–1893
- O. L. Kirkeberg 1893-1893
- A. S. Nielsen 1893–1894
- K. C. Bodholdt 1894–1895
- P. Kjölhede 1895–1903
- K. C. Bodholdt 1903–1911
- N. P. Gravengaard 1911–1918
- K. C. Bodholdt 1918–1922
- S. D. Rodholm 1922–1926
- H. Jörgensen 1926–1936
- Alfred Jensen 1936–1960
- A. Ejnar Farstrup 1960–1962

== See also ==
- United Evangelical Lutheran Church (the other Danish-American Lutheran church body)
