= Concordia College Alabama =

Historically black college in Selma, Alabama, US (1922–2018)

- Former names: Alabama Luther College; Alabama Lutheran Academy and College
- Type: Private historically black college
- Active: 1922–2018
- Parent institution: Concordia University System
- Religious affiliation: Lutheran Church–Missouri Synod
- Location: Selma, Alabama, U.S.
- Campus: 57 acres (23 ha)
- Colors: Green; Yellow
- Nickname: Hornets

Bakke Hall and the Dormitory
- Location within Alabama
- 32.426°N 87.018°W
- Location: Selma, Alabama

History
- Built: 1925

Site notes
- Governing body: Lutheran Church—Missouri Synod

Alabama Register of Landmarks and Heritage
- Official name: Bakke Hall and the Dormitory
- Designated: June 19, 1997

Concordia College Alabama was a private, historically black college associated with the Lutheran Church–Missouri Synod and located in Selma, Alabama. It was the only historically black college among the 10 colleges and universities in the Concordia University System. The college ceased operations at the end of the spring 2018 semester, citing years of financial distress and declining enrollment.

== History ==
In 1919, African-American Lutheran congregations in Alabama petitioned the Evangelical Lutheran Synodical Conference of North America for funds to open a high school and college to train church workers. The school opened in 1922 in a rented cottage, and the Synodical Conference soon purchased 13 acres (5.3 ha) in northeast Selma, Alabama, as the site of the Alabama Luther College. A recitation hall (now named Bakke Hall) and a dormitory were erected at a cost of $36,000 and opened in 1925.

The college was forced to close during the Great Depression and the remaining high school was renamed the Alabama Lutheran Academy. Eventually the college was reopened, resulting in the name Alabama Lutheran Academy and College. In 1981, the name was changed to Concordia College Alabama, and in 1994, it gained accreditation from the Southern Association of Colleges and Schools as a bachelor's degree-granting institution.

In 2007, Portia Holmes Shields became the first woman to serve as chief executive officer and chief academic officer of the university.

In February 2018, the college announced that it would close at the conclusion of its academic year due to enduring financial problems. The 147 members of the final graduating class received their diplomas on April 28, 2018.

On January 3, 2019, Paul J. Kim, a Korean minister, signed paperwork to purchase the campus. He plans to open a "mission retreat center", similar to Yoido Full Gospel Church's Prayer Mountain Korea. He also intends to establish a "contemporary music university" over the next two years.

== Campus ==
Concordia College's Bakke Hall and the Dormitory, completed in 1928, were both added to the Alabama Register of Landmarks and Heritage on June 19, 1997.

In 2010, Concordia increased the size of its campus from 22 acres (8.9 ha) to 57 acres (23 ha) by acquiring the grounds and buildings of the adjacent United Methodist Children's Home.

== Student life ==
The college had 445 students during the fall 2017 term.

=== Athletics ===
At the time of the school's closing, Concordia–Selma athletic teams were called the Hornets. The college was a member of the United States Collegiate Athletic Association (USCAA), primarily competing as an Independent.

Concordia–Selma competed in seven intercollegiate varsity sports: Men's sports included baseball, basketball, and soccer; while women's sports included basketball, softball, track & field, and volleyball.

==== Football ====
The college fielded a football team from 2005 until it was cancelled at the end of the 2015 season due to costs.

=== ROTC ===
Concordia College Army ROTC, a satellite program of Marion Military Institute, featured more than 25 cadets.

== Notable people ==
- Fred Rouse - professional football player
- Titus Ryan - National Football League player
- Cortez Stubbs - professional football player
- Rosa Young - professor

== See also ==
- List of historically black colleges and universities
