= General Council of the Evangelical Lutheran Church in North America =

Lutheran Church Body

- Classification: Protestant
- Orientation: Lutheran
- Associations: National Lutheran Council
- Region: United States
- Origin: 1867; Reading, Pennsylvania
- Merged into: United Lutheran Church in America (1918)
- Congregations: 2,564 in 1917
- Members: 524,259 confirmed in 1917
- Ministers: 1,680 in 1917

The General Council of the Evangelical Lutheran Church in North America, or, in brief, the General Council was a conservative Lutheran church body, formed as a reaction against the new "Americanized Lutheranism" of Samuel Simon Schmucker and the Evangelical Lutheran General Synod of the United States of North America.

The General Council was founded in November, 1867, with ten Lutheran synods becoming members. Founded at the instigation of the Pennsylvania Ministerium, the General Council placed special emphasis on the Lutheran Confessions and their role in the life of the church. In 1872, the General Council adopted the Akron-Galesburg Rule, written by Charles Porterfield Krauth, reserving Lutheran pulpits for Lutheran pastors and Lutheran altars for Lutheran communicants.

Theodore Emanuel Schmauk was the president of the General Council from 1903 until the formation of the United Lutheran Church in America (ULCA) in 1918. The ULCA was formed by the merger of three independent German-language synods: the General Synod, the General Council, and the United Synod of the South. In 1917, the General Council consisted of 14 synods (including the Augustana Synod, which did not join the merger), 1,680 pastors, 2,564 congregations, and 524,259 confirmed members.

== Beginnings ==
At the one hundred and nineteenth convention of the Pennsylvania Ministerium in 1866, a fraternal address was issued "to Evangelical Lutheran Synods, ministers and congregations in the United States and Canadas, which confess the Unaltered Augsburg Confession, inviting them to unite in a convention for the purpose of forming a union of Lutheran Synods."

This call urged "the needs of a general organization, first and supremely for the maintenance of unity in the true faith of the Gospel, and in the uncorrupted Sacraments, as the Word of God teaches and our Church confesses them; and furthermore for the preservation of her genuine spirit and worship, and for the development of her practical life in all her forms."

Although none of the synods remaining in the General Synod responded favorably to this official letter, representatives from the Synod of Pennsylvania, the English Synod, the English District, and the Joint Synod of Ohio, and from the Wisconsin, Michigan, Pittsburg, Minnesota, Iowa, Missouri, Canada, New York, and Norwegian synods assembled at Reading, Pennsylvania, on December 11, 1866. The Augustana Synod was represented by letter. There they unanimously adopted a statement on the "Fundamental principals of Faith and Church Polity." A committee was appointed to outline a constitution to be submitted to the respective District Synods. They required ten synods to accept the constitution before it would go into effect, uniting the synods as district synods in the new General Council of the Evangelical Lutheran Church in North America.

Ten synods adopted the constitution and the first convention met on November 20, 1867, at Fort Wayne, Indiana, where the General Synod had suffered a schism the previous year. A total of twelve synods sent representatives. Several districts of the Missouri Synod sent a letter proposing a series of free conferences to discuss theology before joining together. Likewise, the Ohio Synod declined to join, but sent representatives to discuss differences of theology and practice.

== The Four Points in American Lutheranism ==
Although the Joint Synod of Ohio greatly desired to see a union of Lutheran church bodies, its members saw theological difficulties that would prevent them from joining the new General Council. At the first convention of the General Council, the Ohio Synod's representatives questioned the delegates about the General Council's stance regarding what became known as the Four Points, all four of which the Ohio Synod opposed. Those points were:

1. Is the teaching of chiliasm (millennialism) acceptable in Lutheran churches?
2. Should Lutheran congregations permit mixed (open) communion?
3. Should Lutheran pastors exchange pulpits with "sectarians" (i.e., non-Lutherans)?
4. Can members of Lutheran congregations also be members of secret or unchurchly societies (such as the Masons and the Lodge)?

The delegates of the Iowa Synod brought with them a letter also asking these questions, with the exception of the first, because that synod had decided that millennialism was theologically an open question with which good Lutherans could agree to disagree.

The response of the General Council to the letter of the Iowa Synod was that the council was not prepared to endorse the position of the Iowa Synod, but would "refer the matter to the District Synods until such time as by the blessing of God's Holy Spirit, and the leadings of his Providence, we shall be enabled, throughout the whole General Council and all its churches, to see eye to eye in all the details of practice and usage".

The Iowa Synod, holding that there must be complete and hearty agreement not only in the principles of faith, "but also in an ecclesiastical practice accordant with such faith", refused to complete its connection with the General Council. Its representatives contented themselves with the privilege of debate at its conventions. For similar reasons the Ohio and Missouri synods decided not to enter into the union, and a few years later the Illinois, Wisconsin, and Minnesota synods withdrew from it.

The Four Points became the most important factor in the development of the General Council, arresting in its very first convention the realization of the original plan of its founders, and in no small degree "damping the bright and perhaps somewhat sanguine expectations of its warmest friends", while they kept the body for years in constant agitation. Ultimately, the General Council contained less than half of the Lutheran community previously existing as independent synods. The Illinois Synod merged with the Missouri Synod in 1880, and the Wisconsin and Minnesota Synods merged as the Joint Synod of Wisconsin in 1917.

== Membership ==
Thirteen Lutheran synods were present at the 1866 meeting in Reading, Pennsylvania, that authorized the organization of the General Council. At the first convention in 1867 in Fort Wayne, Indiana, ten of those synods agreed to become full members, while the Joint Synod of Ohio and the Iowa Synod became non-voting associate members, and the Missouri Synod declined to join. Through the years various synods joined and left the General Council:

Member Synods
Synod	Organized	Joined	Left	Comment
Pennsylvania Ministerium	1748	1866		
District Synod of Ohio	1857	1866		
English Synod of Ohio	1836	1866	1872	
Synod of Wisconsin	1850	1866	1869	Left due to the Four Points
Joint Synod of Ohio	1818	1866	1867	Advisory member, left due to the Four Points
Michigan Synod	1860	1866	1888	Left due to the Four Points
Pittsburgh Synod	1845	1866		
Minnesota Synod	1860	1866	1871	Left due to the Four Points
Iowa Synod	1854	1866	1867	Advisory member, left due to the Four Points
Canada Synod	1861	1866		
New York Ministerium	1773	1866		
Norwegian Synod of America	1853	1866	1866	Left due to the Four Points
Scandinavian Augustana Synod	1860	1867	1917	Did not join the merger of the rest of the General Council into the United Lutheran Church
Synod of Illinois	1867	1867	1871	Left due to the Four Points
Synod of Texas	1861	1868	1897	Merged into the Iowa Synod
Chicago Synod	1871	1872		Changed its name from the Synod of Indiana in 1895
Holston Synod	1861	1874	1886	Withdrew to form the United Synod of the South
English Synod of the Northwest	1891	1893		
Synod of Manitoba	1897	1897		
Pacific Synod	1901	1901		
New York and New England Synod	1902	1903		
Synod of Nova Scotia	1903	1903		
Synod of Central Canada	1909	1909		

== Notable people ==
- George Henry Gerberding
- John August William Haas
- Henry Eyster Jacobs
- Charles Porterfield Krauth
- Gottlob Frederick Krotel
- Wilhelm Julius Mann
- William Alfred Passavant
- Theodore Emanuel Schmauk
- Beale Melanchthon Schmucker
- Joseph Augustus Seiss
- Philipp Friedrich Adolph Theodor Spaeth
- Carl Aaron Swensson

== Sources ==
- Bente, F. American Lutheranism Volume II St. Louis: Concordia Publishing House. 1919.
- Ochsenford, Solomon Erb (1912). Documentary history of the General Council of the Evangelical Lutheran Church in America. Philadelphia: General Council Publication House.
- Wolf, Edmund Jacob. The Lutherans in America; a story of struggle, progress, influence and marvelous growth. New York: J.A. Hill, 1889. p. 433-9
