= United Synod of the Evangelical Lutheran Church in the South =

Defunct Christian denomination in the United States

- Abbreviation: United Synod of the South
- Classification: Lutheran
- Associations: National Lutheran Council
- Region: United States
- Origin: 1863; Concord, North Carolina
- Separated from: Evangelical Lutheran General Synod of the United States
- Absorbed: Mississippi Synod (1876); Evangelical Lutheran Tennessee Synod (1886); Evangelical Lutheran Holston Synod (1886)
- Merged into: United Lutheran Church in America (1918)
- Other name(s): General Synod of the Evangelical Lutheran Church in the Confederate States of America (1863–1866); Evangelical Lutheran General Synod in North America (1866–1876); Evangelical Lutheran General Synod South (1876–1886)

The United Synod of the Evangelical Lutheran Church in the South, or simply United Synod of the South, was a historical Lutheran denomination in the southeastern United States during the late 19th and early 20th centuries.

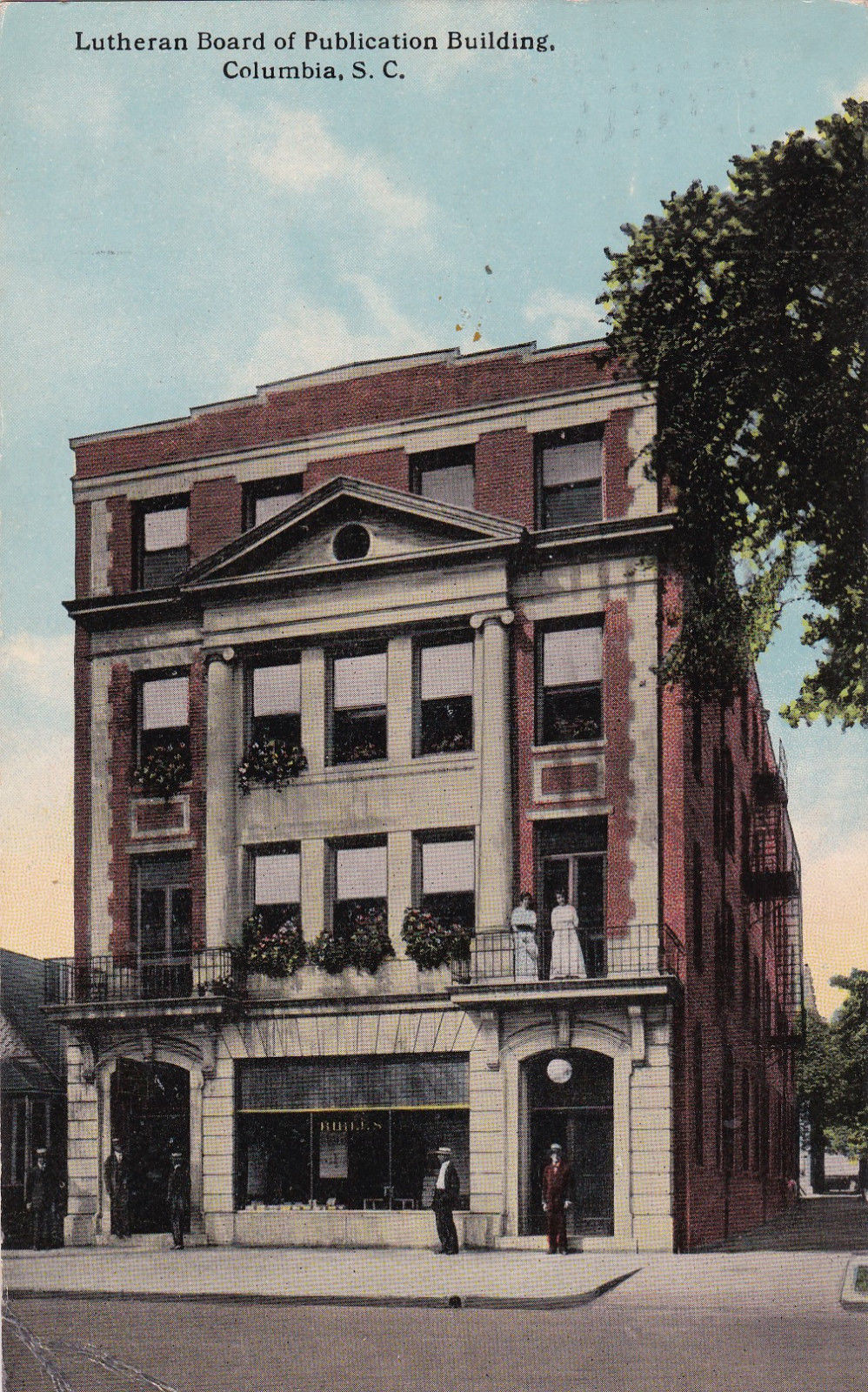
Lutheran Board of Publication headquarters in Columbia, South Carolina, 1916

In 1863, during the American Civil War, the Evangelical Lutheran General Synod of the United States passed several patriotic resolutions that alienated four of its member synods, the North Carolina, South Carolina, Virginia, and Southwestern Virginia synods, located in the Confederacy. Those four synods withdrew from that body and, together with the Georgia Synod, formed the General Synod of the Evangelical Lutheran Church in the Confederate States of America at a meeting in Concord, North Carolina.

In 1866, after the defeat of the Confederacy, the name of the synod was changed to the Evangelical Lutheran General Synod in North America. The Mississippi Synod became a member in 1876. That same year the organization's name was again changed, this time to the Evangelical Lutheran General Synod South.

Overtures had been made to the Evangelical Lutheran Tennessee Synod and the Evangelical Lutheran Holston Synod at various times, but those two synods had declined membership because they viewed the General Synod as not strictly following the Lutheran Confessions. Those concerns were eventually addressed, and in 1886 the Tennessee and Holston synods met in Roanoke, Virginia with the six synods of the General Synod South to create the United Synod of the Evangelical Lutheran Church in the South.

In 1918 the United Synod of the South merged with the General Synod and General Council to form the United Lutheran Church in America (ULCA). In 1962, the ULCA became part of the new Lutheran Church in America (LCA).

On January 1, 1988, the LCA ceased to exist when it, along with the American Lutheran Church and the Association of Evangelical Lutheran Churches, joined together to form the Evangelical Lutheran Church in America (ELCA), today the largest Lutheran church body in the United States. Most of the United Synod's churches were in Virginia, North Carolina, and South Carolina, three states that remain the "heartland" for the ELCA in the southeastern U.S.

== Bibliography ==
- Bente, F. American Lutheranism Volume II (St. Louis: Concordia Publishing House. 1919)
- Nichol, Todd W. All These Lutherans (Minneapolis: Augsburg Publishers. 1986)
- Wolf, Edmund Jacob. The Lutherans in America; a story of struggle, progress, influence and marvelous growth (New York: J.A. Hill. 1889)
