= Evangelical Lutheran General Synod of the United States of America =

Historical American Lutheran body

Evangelical Lutheran General Synod
- Classification: Protestant
- Orientation: Lutheran
- Associations: National Lutheran Council
- Origin: 1820; Hagerstown, Maryland
- Separations: United Synod of the South (1863); General Council of the Evangelical Lutheran Church in North America (1866)
- Merged into: United Lutheran Church in America (1918)
- Congregations: 1,848 in 1916
- Members: 477,434 baptized members; 366,728 confirmed members; 260,720 communicants in 1916
- Ministers: 1,451 in 1916

The Evangelical Lutheran General Synod of the United States of America, commonly known as the General Synod, was a historical Lutheran denomination in the United States. Established in 1820, it was the first national Lutheran body to be formed in the U.S. and by 1918 had become the third largest Lutheran group in the nation. In 1918, the General Synod merged with other Lutheran denominations to create the United Lutheran Church in America. Both the General Synod and the United Lutheran Church are predecessor bodies to the contemporary Evangelical Lutheran Church in America.

== History ==
The General Synod was organized in 1820 at Hagerstown, Maryland, as a union or federation of four regional synods: the Pennsylvania Ministerium, the North Carolina Synod, the New York Ministerium, and the Synod of Maryland and Virginia. The Pennsylvania Ministerium had suggested the creation of a general synod two years earlier and took the lead in organizing it. The Joint Synod of Ohio and the Tennessee Synod refused to join, citing concerns that the new body would be too hierarchical.

In 1823, the Pennsylvania Ministerium withdrew itself to pursue plans for a union with the Reformed churches in Pennsylvania based on the model of the Prussian Union of churches. The New York Ministerium, which was started with the help of Johann Christopher Kunze, meanwhile, had ceased operations and would not become active again until 1837. Nevertheless, the second convention of the General Synod took place in 1823, with the newly established West Pennsylvania Synod becoming a member.

Like many Protestant denominations, the General Synod was split over the issue of slavery and the political and military conflict of the American Civil War. In 1863, the southern synods were offended over Civil War resolutions passed by the General Synod. In response, they withdrew and formed a General Synod for the Confederate States of America (later renamed the United Synod of the South). In 1866, the General Synod further split over theological issues when the General Council of the Evangelical Lutheran Church in North America was formed by dissatisfied members of the General Synod. Before these secessions, the General Synod claimed 164,000 communicants. This was about two-thirds of the entire Lutheran population in America. The resulting numerical losses totaled 76,000 communicants.

In 1918, the General Synod, the General Council and the United Synod of the South were reunited with the formation of the United Lutheran Church in America, a predecessor of the Evangelical Lutheran Church in America. By the time of the merger, the General Synod ranked third in size among the largest Lutheran bodies in America. In 1916, it reported 477,434 baptized members, 366,728 confirmed members, and 260,720 communicants.

== Beliefs ==
The early history of the General Synod has been characterized as one of loose commitment to Lutheran orthodoxy. Its constitution lacked references to the Bible and the Lutheran confessions. Furthermore, distinctions were made between parts of the Augsburg Confession, with some parts deemed "fundamental" doctrines and others labeled "non-fundamental". Fundamental doctrines alone were required to be believed. Fundamental doctrines included biblical teachings with which other Protestants agreed, and the General Synod did stand in opposition to the rationalism making inroads into other Lutheran bodies. The doctrines concerning baptismal regeneration and the real presence were rejected, however.

In 1855, Samuel S. Schmucker, a supporter of revivalism and interdenominational agencies like the American Sunday School Union, proposed the Definite Synodical Platform. The Platform proposed revisions to the Augsburg Confession in order to make it more acceptable to American sensibilities, namely Calvinist and American evangelical theology, a development that was termed "American Lutheranism" or "New School Lutheranism". The Platform specifically sought to eliminate references to baptismal regeneration and the real presence.

By the 1850s, however, Confessional Lutheranism was enjoying a resurgence. In 1864, the General Synod's constitution was amended to require synods to accept the Augsburg Confession as a correct presentation of fundamental doctrines. By 1913, all of the Lutheran confessions had been officially adopted by the General Synod. While doctrines and practices contradicting the confessions were still tolerated in the General Synod, the moves toward a more orthodox and confessional position made a merger with the Lutheran General Council a real possibility.

== Organization ==
The General Synod was structured as a voluntary association of regional Lutheran church bodies called district synods. As a result, its authority over member synods was limited by its constitution. The General Synod was responsible for adopting catechisms, liturgies or hymnals. The General Synod was also responsible for creating general boards to oversee the missionary and benevolent activities of the church, such as foreign and home missions. It could offer advice on doctrinal or disciplinary disputes when requested to by synods, congregations or ministers.

The constitution required a convention to be held every two years. Member synods were entitled to send an equal number of clerical and lay delegates to conventions in proportion to the number of ministers belonging to each synod. For every ten ministers it possessed, a synod was awarded one additional clerical delegate and an equal number of lay delegates. An ordained minister was elected to preside over the convention as president. A secretary and a treasurer were also elected from among the deputies. Their term of office ended when the next convention met.

District Synods
Synod	Organized	Comment
Maryland Synod	1820	
West Pennsylvania Synod	1825	
East Ohio Synod	1836	Originally an English branch of the Joint Synod of Ohio.
Allegheny Synod	1842	Included congregations in western Pennsylvania.
East Pennsylvania Synod	1842	Organized by former members of the Pennsylvania Ministerium who advocated the use of English & revivals.
Miami Synod of Ohio	1844	
Pittsburgh Synod	1845	
Wittenberg Synod of Ohio	1847	Organized by professors of Wittenberg College.
Olive Branch Synod of Indiana	1848	
Northern Illinois Synod	1851	Included congregations in Illinois, Iowa and Wisconsin.
Central Pennsylvania Synod	1855	
Iowa Synod	1855	
Northern Indiana Synod	1855	
Central Illinois Synod	1867	
Susquehanna Synod	1867	Formed in 1845 as a conference of the East Pennsylvania Synod.
Kansas Synod	1868	Included congregations in Kansas and Missouri.
Nebraska Synod	1873	
Wartburg Synod of Illinois	1876	
California Synod	1891	
German Nebraska Synod	1891	Included congregations in Nebraska, Kansas, Missouri, Colorado, the Dakotas.
Rocky Mountain Synod	1891	Included Wyoming, Colorado, New Mexico.
Southern Illinois Synod	1901	
New York Synod	1908	Created by the merger of the Synod of New York & New Jersey (which had split off from the New York Ministerium) with the Hartwick, Franckean, and Melanchthon Synods.
West Virginia Synod	1912	

== Institutions ==
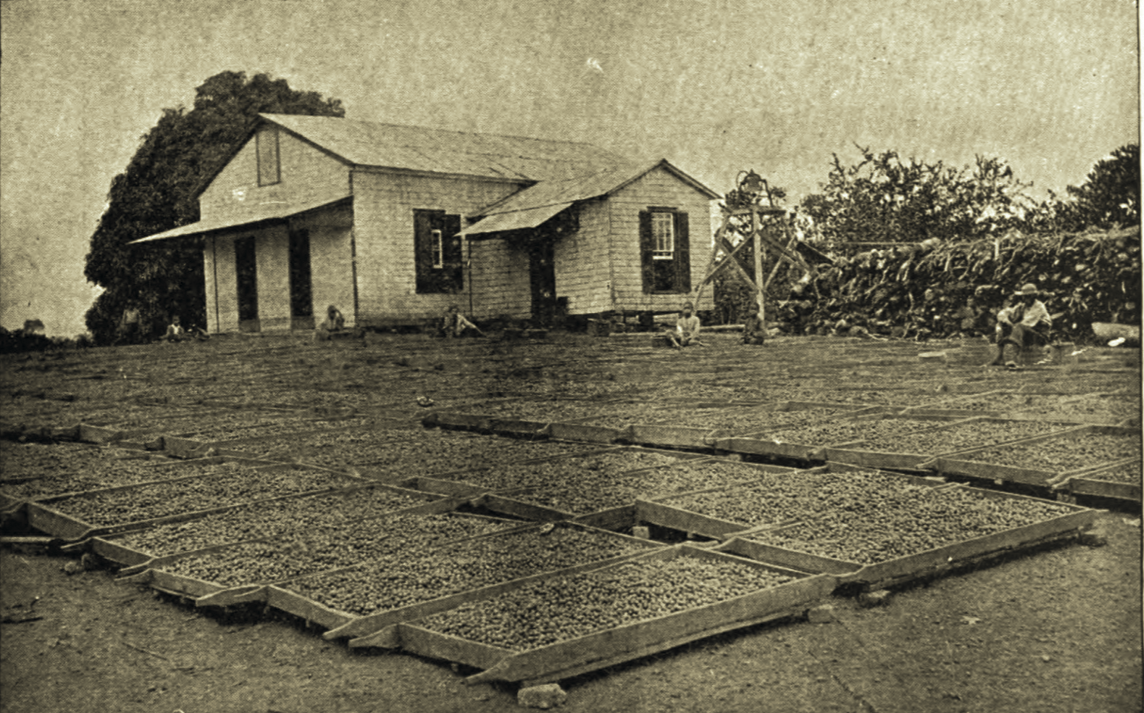
Muhlenberg Mission, Liberia

Domestic missionary work was conducted by member synods. The General Synod sponsored foreign missions in Liberia and India, where it established the Arthur G. Watts Memorial College at Guntur in 1885. The Synod also sponsored a number of orphanages and nursing homes. Educational institutions included:

- Carthage College
- Gettysburg College and Gettysburg Seminary
- Hamma Divinity School
- Hartwick Seminary
- Martin Luther Seminary (Lincoln, Nebraska)
- Midland College
- Susquehanna University
- Western Seminary
- Wittenberg College

The General Synod published two periodicals: The Lutheran Quarterly and the Lutheran Church Worker and Observer.
