= United Lutheran Church in America =

Defunct Christian denomination in the United States

- Classification: Protestant
- Orientation: Lutheran
- Structure: National church, regional synods, and local congregations
- Region: United States
- Origin: 1918
- Merger of: General Synod; General Council; United Synod of the South
- Absorbed: Slovak Zion Synod (1920); Icelandic Synod (1942)
- Merged into: Lutheran Church in America (1962)
- Congregations: 4,363 (1961)
- Members: 2,390,075 (1961)
- Ministers: 4,893 (1961)

The United Lutheran Church in America (ULCA) was established in 1918 in commemoration of the 400th anniversary of the Protestant Reformation after negotiations among several American Lutheran national synods resulted in the merger of three German-language synods: the General Synod (founded in 1820), the General Council (1867), and the United Synod of the South (1863). The Slovak Zion Synod (1919) joined the ULCA in 1920. The Icelandic Synod (1885) also joined the United Lutheran Church in America in 1942. It was the largest Lutheran denomination in the United States for most of the first half of the 20th century.

Prior to the formation of the ULCA, the original three synods had formed various committees between 1877 and 1902 to coordinate activities. One of these was a joint committee to prepare a "Common Service for all English-speaking Lutherans". As a result of that committee's work, the Common Service of 1887 was adopted by all three synods, and the Common Service Book of the Lutheran Church was jointly published by the publishing houses of the three synods in 1917. The ULCA took over publication of the Common Service Book upon its formation in 1918.

In 1962, after a five-year merger process, the United Lutheran Church in America became part of the new Lutheran Church in America (LCA). Twenty-six years later, on January 1, 1988, the LCA joined with the American Lutheran Church (1960) and the Association of Evangelical Lutheran Churches, (1978) to form the Evangelical Lutheran Church in America (ELCA), which is today the largest Lutheran church body in the United States.

In 1961, just before its merger into the LCA, the ULCA had 4,893 pastors, 4,363 congregations, and 2,390,075 members.

== Presidents ==
- Frederick Hermann Knubel 1918–1944
- Franklin Clark Fry 1944–1962

== Other sources ==
- Wolf, Edmund Jacob. The Lutherans in America; a story of struggle, progress, influence and marvelous growth (New York: J.A. Hill. 1889)
- Bente, F. American Lutheranism Volume II (St. Louis: Concordia Publishing House. 1919)
- Nichol, Todd W. All These Lutherans (Minneapolis: Augsburg Publishers. 1986)
