= CLC =

CLC may refer to:

== Education and academia ==
=== Schools and educational facilities ===
- California Lutheran College, a private university in Thousand Oaks, California, US
- Central Labour College, a British higher education institution
- Central Lakes College, a public community college in Minnesota, US
- Cheltenham Ladies' College, a private boarding and day school in Cheltenham, England
- City learning centre
- Clapp/Langley/Crawford Complex
- College of Lake County, a community college in Grayslake, Illinois, US
- Contemporary Learning Center, an alternative school district–operated school in Houston, Texas, US
- Crystal Lake Central High School, a high school in Crystal Lake, Illinois, US

=== Other uses in education and academia ===
- Cambridge Latin Course, a secondary school Latin programme
- Carrickfergus Learning Community
- Collegiate Licensing Company
- Critical Legal Conference, an annual legal conference based in the UK

== Military ==
- Chinese Labour Corps
- Combat logistics company, type of unit within the US Marine Corps
- Combined Logistics Command, a division of the Taiwanese Ministry of National Defense
- Command light cruiser, a US Navy hull classification symbol
- Conduct Leadership Cross, a decoration awarded to members of the Botswana Defence Force

== Organizations ==
=== Companies ===
- Call & Logistik Center, an Austrian company
- Canadian Locomotive Company
- Century Limitless Corporation
- Collegiate Licensing Company
- Columbia and Cowlitz Railway
- Computer Learning Connection
- Cymdeithas Lyfrau Ceredigion, a Welsh publisher

=== Organized labour bodies ===
- Cambodian Labour Confederation, a Cambodian national trade union centre
- Canadian Labour Congress, a Canadian national trade union centre
- Caribbean Labour Congress, a trade union centre whose London branch published Caribbean News
- Central labor council, an American type of local labour council chartered by the AFL-CIO
- Central Labour College, a former British higher education institution

=== Professional associations ===
- Canadian League of Composers
- Child Life Council, former name of the Association of Child Life Professionals, an American association of pediatric health care professionals
- Council for Licensed Conveyancers, a regulatory body in England and Wales

=== Religious organizations ===
- California Lutheran College
- Christian Legal Centre
- Christian Life Centre, a number of individual and networked Pentecostal churches in Australia
- Christian Life Community, an international association of lay Christians
- Christian Literature Centre, a wing of the Council of Baptist Churches in Northeast India
- Church of the Lutheran Confession, an American Lutheran denomination
- CLC International, an international Christian literature mission committed to the distribution of the Bible
- Concordia Lutheran Conference, an American Lutheran denomination

=== Other organizations ===
- Campaign Legal Center, a US nonprofit working to advance voting rights and transparent democratic processes
- Campaign Life Coalition, a Canadian advocacy organization
- Canada Lands Company, a Canadian Crown corporation
- Carrier Linguistic Committee, a Canadian First Nations organization
- Central Land Council, an Indigenous land council in Northern Territory, Australia
- Centre for Liveable Cities, a think tank in Singapore
- Cheshire Lines Committee, a railway in Great Britain
- City of London Corporation, the local authority of the City of London
- Communities Liaison Committee, an administrative body set up in Malaya under British rule
- Community legal centre, type of Australian not-for-profit organization providing legal aid services
- Cuban Liberty Council

== Science ==
- Center Loaded Coil in a radio antenna, see Loading coil#Radio antenna
- CLC (gene), Charcot-Leyden crystal protein, gene for a human enzyme
- CLC bio, a bioinformatics software company headquartered in Denmark
- Chemical looping combustion

== Transportation ==
- Canadian Locomotive Company
- Columbia and Cowlitz Railway
- Cheshire Lines Committee, a railway in Great Britain
- Clear Lake City STOLport, IATA code for the defunct airport formerly located in southeast Houston, Texas, US
- Mercedes-Benz CLC-Class

== Other uses ==
- Calculate Linux Container
- Canadian Location Code, for forecast regions
- Certified lactation counsellor
- Chief Labour Commissioner
- Chinese Library Classification
- CLC (group), a South Korean girl group
- Clear Lake City (Greater Houston), a master-planned community in Texas, US
- Closed-loop communication
- Coastal Lacrosse Conference, an American intercollegiate athletic conference in Maryland, New Jersey, and Virginia
- Continental Lacrosse Conference, an intercollegiate athletic conference in Michigan and the northeastern United States
- Croatian Language Corpus, a text corpus compiled at the Institute of Croatian Language and Linguistics
- International Convention on Civil Liability for Oil Pollution Damage, a 1969 international maritime treaty

== See also ==
- Catholic Ladies College, Eltham (CLC Eltham)
- Chinese Language Center (NDHU-CLC)
- CLC-1 (disambiguation)
