= Child Life =

Child Life could refer to:

- Child Life (journal), an academic journal published by the Froebel Society between 1931 and 1939
- Child Life (magazine), published between 1922 and 2007
- Child life specialist, pediatric health care professionals
  - Child life (degree), the field of study of child life specialists
- Child Life Insurance
- Chase Child Life Program
