= Child life (degree) =

Child life is a field of study dedicated to preparing students to become child life specialists. A child life degree may be attained either at a bachelor's or master's degree level. Child life may be a major, minor, or area of concentration within a related field of study.

== The child life profession ==
Child life specialists primarily work in hospital settings. In pediatric hospitals, it is common to find an entire child life department. Child life programs are devoted to minimizing anxiety and stress experienced by pediatric patients and their families. In addition, they may help advise or facilitate sick adults in explaining to children an acute and/or chronic illness, or (impending) death, in an age-appropriate way. They facilitate therapeutic interventions including playroom sessions, educational preparation for procedures, diagnosis education and grief support. They also offer distraction to ease anxiety during invasive procedures.

== Academic requirements ==
Child life academic programs have a theoretical basis of study in child development, family systems, play, stress/coping, separation, and loss with supplemental areas of study in human/lifespan development, learning, education, organizational systems and group dynamics. Child life programs also have applied areas of study, including: therapeutic play; family-centered care; pain management (non-pharmacological); guided imagery/relaxation techniques; comfort positioning; preparation; expressive interventions; ethics; bereavement support; impact of illness, injury and health care on patients and families; supervision/program administration; pediatric diagnoses; scope of practice; and charting/documentation. In order to qualify for the Certified Child Life Specialist (CCLS) credential, which is administered by the Child Life Council, students must complete a minimum of 10 college level courses in child life, human development, education, psychology, or a related field of study. Beginning with the fall 2013 exam administration, the Child Life Council will require that applicants for the exam have completed an academic course taught by a Certified Child Life Specialist.

== Internship requirements ==
Child life academic programs often have an internship or fieldwork program as part of their degree requirements. The Child Life Council requires that a minimum of 480 hours of fieldwork under the supervision of a Certified Child Life Specialist be completed in order for a candidate to be eligible to take the Child Life Certification Examination and attain the Certified Child Life Specialist (CCLS) credential. The primary goal of a clinical internship is to facilitate students’ application of theory into practice, thus preparing students for employment as child life professionals. Child life internships are typically not paid, and effective beginning in 2012, the Child Life Council will cease accepting paid work experience in lieu of a 480 internship as a prerequisite for the certification exam.

== Practicum ==
Prior to completing a child life internship, students may choose (or academic programs may require students to participate in) a practicum experience in which a child life student is familiarized with the child life profession in general.

== Fellowship ==
Following an internship, child life students may choose to continue their educational experience with a child life fellowship. A fellowship often offers some form of compensation, but is still supervised directly by an experienced child life specialist for the purpose of further developing the fellow's child life skills.
