= Chase Child Life Program =

US child care organization

The Chase Child Life Program addresses the social, emotional and developmental needs of children dealing with the stress of illness and hospitalization. Child Life Specialists provide opportunities for children of all ages to master the healthcare experience by preparing and supporting them through medical procedures. Therapeutic play sessions take place in Chase Place playrooms and at bedside. Playrooms are safe places for children to build coping skills, express creativity through play, and share emotions and concerns. The program also extends support and resources to families in times of bereavement.

Established in 1970, the Chase Child Life Program was renamed in 2000 in honor of Chase Richards, whose parents co-founded The Chase Foundation to support this program.

In collaboration with local universities and colleges, the Chase Child Life Program offers comprehensive internship and fieldwork opportunities. Volunteers also form a vital part of the program.
