= Chase Foundation =

US non-profit organization

- Formation: 1993
- Type: Nonprofit organization
- Headquarters: Calabasas, California, United States
- Chairman: Robin Richards
- Key people: Susan Richards; Ryan B. Anderson; Leonard Fisher
- Revenue: US$203,480 (2014)
- Expenses: US$210,230 (2014)
- Website: thechasefoundation.org

The Chase Foundation is a non-profit organization established in 1993 by Robin and Susan Richards. The foundation makes the Chase Child Life Program available at no cost to patients 21 and under, and their families, at Children's Hospital Los Angeles.

Chase Child Life Program addresses the social, emotional, and developmental needs of children dealing with the stress of illness and hospitalization.
