= CLC-1 =

CLC-1 may refer to one of the following:

- USS Northampton, a United States Navy command light cruiser which served from 1953 until 1970
- CLC-1 Radar, a ground-based mobile tracking radar used by the People's Liberation Army of China
- CLc1, is the commodity industry code for West Texas Intermediate crude oil future contracts to be finalized at the next monthly futures closing
