= Lutheran Churches of the Reformation =

Association of Lutheran congregations

- Abbreviation: LCR
- Classification: Protestant
- Orientation: Lutheran
- Polity: Congregational
- Region: United States
- Origin: 1956
- Separated from: Orthodox Lutheran Conference; Lutheran Church–Missouri Synod
- Separations: Fellowship of Lutheran Congregations (1979); Orthodox Lutheran Confessional Conference (2006)
- Congregations: 12 (2021)
- Members: 1,300 (2009)
- Ministers: 11 (2021)
- Publications: One Accord; The Faithful Word
- Official website: www.lcrusa.org

The Lutheran Churches of the Reformation (LCR) is an association of Lutheran congregations. The LCR has its roots among groups of Lutherans that broke with the Lutheran Church–Missouri Synod (LCMS) in the middle of the 20th century, and was formally incorporated in 1964. Church services are generally traditional and reverent in the style of the mid-1900s conservative Christians.

== History ==
In 1951, the Orthodox Lutheran Conference (OLC) was formed by pastors and congregations of the LCMS who were critical of the theological changes occurring in that body. The OLC itself split in 1956 when Paul E. Kretzmann, a professor in the OLC's seminary, suspended church fellowship with some congregations after they charged him with teaching error in class. Those congregations formed the Concordia Lutheran Conference, while most of the others, along with Kretzmann, later joined with other conservatives leaving the LCMS to organize as the LCR.

After the 1959 convention of the LCMS, conservative members of the synod began holding State of the Synod Conferences to discuss the problems they saw. Kretzmann, Wallace McLaughlin, and Harold Romoser, who all had been involved in the formation of the OLC, were also involved in these conferences. At the first conference, a 200-page book of documentation prepared by pastor Herman Otten of Trinity Lutheran Church in New Haven, Missouri, was presented. It listed every controversy within the LCMS since 1950, with sections on Martin Scharlemann, Jaroslav Pelikan, Martin Marty, the Common Confession, and Biblical authority and inspiration. The conference on May 15–16, 1961, in Milwaukee, Wisconsin, was attended by over 400 laymen and pastors who hoped to make progress on their concerns at the synod's upcoming convention in 1962. However, the State of the Synod Conference was not permitted to have a booth at the convention and the issues of concern were not addressed. As a result, St. Matthew's Lutheran Church in Detroit, Michigan, whose pastor, Cameron A. MacKenzie Sr., was a leader in the conferences, left the synod.

In early 1964, a group of pastors and laymen meeting at Trinity Lutheran Church in New Haven, Missouri, agreed that the time had come to form a new church body. The LCR was officially formed on April 28–29, 1964, at Emmaus Lutheran Church in Chicago. Notably, neither Otten nor Trinity Lutheran joined the new body. MacKenzie was elected as the first administrator and Romoser as the first coadjutor. By 1965, the LCR had seven member congregations, with applications from three more and ten other congregations in fellowship.

The LCR discussed church fellowship with the Wisconsin Evangelical Lutheran Synod (WELS) in the 1960s, but finally decided, in July 1970, that the differences regarding the doctrine of church and ministry were divisive of church fellowship.

In 1972, St. Matthew's in Detroit left the LCR because of what it saw as improper involvement of the LCR in the congregation's affairs. Four other congregations were removed from membership in 1973 because they sided with St. Matthew's. Three more congregations, including Rosomer's, left for the same reason in 1976.

The Fellowship of Lutheran Congregations (FLC), is a group of congregations that left the LCR in 1979 after a dispute concerning the proper procedure of excommunication, namely, whether the person being excommunicated had to be present when the voters' assembly considered the question. The congregations of the FLC joined the Concordia Lutheran Conference in about 2004.

For a time in the 1990s, the LCR was in official church fellowship with the Illinois Lutheran Conference (ILC). The ILC was organized in 1979 after three congregations left the WELS in protest after a pastor was suspended due to claims he made regarding the King James Version of the Bible. There was controversy between the ILC and the LCR regarding the "appearance of evil" (1 Thessalonians 5:22) and the doctrine of church and ministry. The LCR severed the fellowship because of differences discovered during the controversy over the "appearance of evil".

In February 2006, five congregations and four pastors suspended church fellowship with the rest of the LCR when, in the wake of a disagreement regarding the doctrine of the ministry, an LCR congregation was dissolved through legal action by certain members, most of whom were female, who disagreed with their pastor. This led to accusations of female suffrage by one side and legalism by the other. The LCR was never asked by either side of the congregation to adjudicate the division. The congregations that suspended fellowship in February 2006 withdrew their membership from the LCR in April 2006 after a special convention called to address the controversy refused to discuss the matter of female suffrage and the aforementioned dissolution. A position paper titled The Ministry and Auxiliary Office with Respect to Legalism that was presented at that conference in an attempt to resolve the controversy has since been adopted unanimously by the remaining congregations of the LCR. Another LCR position paper titled Liberty or Death, written to draw attention to different kinds of legalism, was subsequently adopted in July 2007. Those congregations that withdrew membership with the LCR have declared church fellowship with each other and have since organized the Orthodox Lutheran Confessional Conference (OLCC). A sixth congregation, in Hudson, Michigan, later withdrew from the LCR over the same issues, and remains independent.

== Beliefs ==
The Lutheran Churches of the Reformation teach that the Bible is the only authoritative and error-free source for doctrine. It subscribes to the Lutheran Confessions (the Book of Concord) not in-so-far-as but because it is an accurate presentation of what Scripture teaches. It teaches that Jesus is the center of Scripture and the only way to eternal salvation, and that the Holy Spirit uses the gospel alone in Word and Sacraments (Baptism and Holy Communion) to bring people to faith in Jesus as Savior and keep them in that faith, strengthening them in their daily life of sanctification.

The doctrine of the Lutheran Churches of the Reformation is summarized in Franz August Otto Pieper's Brief Statement of the Doctrinal Position of the Missouri Synod and Wallace H. McLaughlin's We All Believe in One True God: A Summary of Biblical Doctrine.

== Operations ==
The Lutheran Churches of the Reformation publishes One Accord, a monthly devotional and news magazine, and The Faithful Word, a quarterly theological journal.

The Martin Luther Institute of Sacred Studies in Decatur, Indiana, is the seminary and teacher's college of the LCR.

The LCR is governed through annual conventions where delegates of the congregations vote. Doctrinal resolutions must be unanimous, or those in the minority will be suspended from the LCR. The day-to-day business of the LCR is run by the Council, whose members are elected to three year terms, commissions, and committees.

For missions, the LCR has a missionary-at-large to serve those who have moved away from their congregations and other like-minded Lutherans. Abroad, the LCR supports congregations in Nigeria and Kenya and has trained pastors for the Lutheran Churches of the Reformation in Nigeria. The LCR has also held seminars to train pastors in the Democratic Republic of the Congo.

As of March 2009, about 1,300 people are baptized members of LCR congregations.

== Distinctive characteristics ==
The LCR believes that the local congregation is the only divinely ordained church organization, and does not refer to synods or denominations as churches. This separates the group from some other conservative Lutherans such as the Wisconsin Evangelical Lutheran Synod.

The congregations of the LCR use the King James Version of the Bible for all public uses, the 1943 "Blue" edition of Luther's Small Catechism in confirmation instruction, and The Lutheran Hymnal of 1941. The LCR does not, however, hold to the King James Only position, since it recognizes the traditional Hebrew and Greek, for the Old and New Testaments respectively, to be authoritative over any translation.

In 1990, the LCR passed a resolution titled "Procreation" stating that birth control, in all forms, is sin, although the denomination "allow(s) for… exceptional cases (casuistry)", for example, when the woman's life or health is at risk.

Congregations of the LCR interpret 1 Timothy 2:12 to support their practice of allowing only males to vote in congregational assemblies. This represents alignment with the most conservative Lutheran bodies in the U.S., and departs significantly from its parent body, the LCMS, which permits its congregations local discretion on the matter.

The Lutheran Churches of the Reformation hold to Brief Statement of 1932, which confirms the long-held traditional beliefs of the Lutheran Church as documented in the Book of Concord, including: inerrancy of Scripture, divine creation in six days, a young earth, the divine institution of the local congregation and of the local office of the ministry, closed fellowship, and of the antichrist.
