= Association of Child Life Professionals =

Nonprofit professional association for child life specialists

The Association of Child Life Professionals (ACLP) was formed in 1982, (then called the Child Life Council), as a nonprofit professional association for child life specialists. As of 2012, ACLP’s membership was composed of nearly 5,000 individuals representing approximately 600 organizations worldwide. ACLP is governed by a board of directors elected from the membership. The work of the association is accomplished by committees and task forces composed of volunteers, who work with a paid staff, located at the ACLP headquarters in Arlington, Virginia.

== The Child Life Profession ==
Child life specialists work with children and families in hospitals and other settings to help them cope with the challenges of hospitalization, illness, and disability. They provide children with age-appropriate preparation for medical procedures, pain management and coping strategies, and play and self-expression activities. They also provide information, support, and guidance to parents, siblings, and other family members.

== Association of Child Life Professionals Programs and Services ==
ACLP organizes professional development opportunities for child life specialists, including the ACLP Annual Conference on Professional Issues, and facilitates the exchange of knowledge and resources through face-to-face networking and online learning communities. The organization offers a series of child life-related publications through its online bookstore, and publishes a quarterly professional newsletter, the ACLP Bulletin, as well a monthly e-newsletter, Child Life News Monthly. ACLP also administers the examination-based Child Life Certification program.

== History ==
The Association for Child Life Professionals traces its origins to the Association for the Care of Children in Hospitals (ACCH), which was founded in 1967 by a group of early child life workers, who recognized the need for a large, multidisciplinary organization to effect positive change in hospital environments for children and families. ACCH membership included doctors, nurses, child life specialists, parents and other health professionals working with children and families. In 1974, a Child Life Study Section was created within ACCH to help the child life profession achieve a separate identity, and to continue defining the theoretical basis of child life specialists’ work with children, the essential elements of professional practice, and educational requirements.

After an ad hoc Committee on Structure for Child Life Professional Issues recommended the formation of a separate professional organization for child life specialists, in 1982, the Child Life Council was founded with separate officers and its own professional development conference. In 1983, CLC had 235 founding members. A professional credentialing program was established in 1986. Over the next two decades, child life programs and CLC membership continued to grow, as the organization developed a variety of professional resources and official documents, including standards of educational preparation, requirements of professional competency, standards of clinical practice, and program review and development tools.

As of 2012, the Child Life Council had approximately 5,000 members. As part of its 2015-2018 strategic plan, the Child Life Council undertook a process to rebrand in an effort to position the organization and its members for greater success. As a result of the rebranding efforts, the Child Life Council officially changed its name to the Association of Child Life Professionals in 2016.

== Certification ==
The Association of Child Life Professionals issues the Certified Child Life Specialist (CCLS) credential, which is administered by the Child Life Certification Commission and ACLP staff. The program was designed to foster uniform standards of practice and ethical conduct among child life specialists. To achieve the CCLS credential, each candidate must attain a minimum of a bachelor's degree, with a total of 10 college-level courses in child life or a related subject area, complete a 600-hour internship, and then must demonstrate an acceptable level of knowledge by successfully completing the Child Life Professional Certification Examination. Certification is maintained through the documentation of 60 or more professional development hours, which are reviewed at the end of every 5-year certification cycle.
