= Concordia Lutheran Conference =

Small Lutheran denomination in North America

- Classification: Protestant
- Orientation: Lutheran
- Theology: Confessional Lutheran
- Polity: Congregational
- President: David T. Mensing
- Associations: 9 mission stations in Russia and Nigeria
- Region: United States, especially Illinois, Washington, and Oregon
- Founder: Paul E. Kretzmann, Wallace McLaughlin, and others
- Origin: 1951, 1957; Okabena, Minnesota
- Separated from: Lutheran Church–Missouri Synod
- Absorbed: Fellowship of Lutheran Congregations (2004)
- Congregations: 5
- Ministers: 3
- Other name(s): Orthodox Lutheran Conference
- Official website: www.concordialutheranconf.com

The Concordia Lutheran Conference (CLC) is a small organization of Lutheran churches in the United States which formed in 1956. It was a reorganization of some of the churches of the Orthodox Lutheran Conference (OLC), which had been formed in September 1951, in Okabena, Minnesota, following a break with Lutheran Church–Missouri Synod (LCMS). It is the remaining successor of the Orthodox Lutheran Conference. The current president is David T. Mensing, pastor of Peace Evangelical Lutheran Church in Oak Forest, Illinois. All members of the board of directors serve one year terms. The CLC has five congregations and is in fellowship with nine mission congregations in Russia and Nigeria.

== History ==
In the 1930s, some theologians and leaders in the LCMS began advocating the establishment of altar and pulpit fellowship with the American Lutheran Church (ALC). One of these was Dr. Theodore Graebner, a professor at Concordia Seminary in St. Louis, Missouri. Graebner gave a lecture to a Texas pastors conference in 1934 that criticized what he saw as unnecessary legalism in the synod; it was published as a book, The Borderland of Right and Wrong, in 1935. In subsequent revisions of the book, Graebner took an increasingly less restrictive view of church union. Nevertheless, in 1943, he and a colleague at the seminary, Dr. Paul E. Kretzmann, co-authored a book against unionism, Toward Lutheran Union: A Scriptural and Historical Approach. However, in 1944, Graebner signed the "Statement of the Forty-four" which openly repudiated the synod's stand on church fellowship. Kretzmann, who staunchly supported the LCMS position, filed charges of false doctrine against Graebner. When nothing was done, Kretzmann resigned from the seminary and began organizing opposition.

Among those pastors who supported Kretzmann were Wallace McLaughlin, who eventually became, with Kretzmann, one of the founders of the OLC, and Harold Romoser, who was well connected to the president of the LCMS, John Behnken, but did not join the OLC. The synod's 1950 convention provided additional impetus to the eventual split when it approved the Common Confession that had been drawn up with the ALC.

However, the big issue that drove the split was the question of whether breaking an engagement should be considered the same as getting a divorce. Historically, betrothal had been seen as the equivalent of marriage and was legally binding; however, the modern view of engagement had become prevalent in the United States in the twentieth century. The two views led to extended debate within the LCMS. On May 24, 1949, the faculty of Concordia Seminary issued a theological opinion that the modern practice of engagement was not the same as betrothal and that an engagement could be broken without sinning. In response, a group of laymen and a few pastors in St. Louis formed a study group and produced the "Confession of Faith Professed and Practiced by All True Lutherans". This document served as the basis for the OLC when it was founded on September 25, 1951, at St. John's Lutheran Church in Okabena, Minnesota. Originally the OLC consisted of ten pastors (one of whom later withdrew) and six laymen.

About four years later, the OLC split. Some of its members joined the Wisconsin Evangelical Lutheran Synod, some remained independent, and the remainder formed the CLC. Kretzmann, who taught at the OLC's seminary, had been accused of teaching false doctrine by another pastor, resulting in Kretzmann and those who supported him breaking fellowship with several of the congregations in the OLC; those congregations then formed the CLC.

In 2004, the CLC absorbed the congregations of the Fellowship of Lutheran Congregations. The FLC was organized in 1979, when a group of Lutheran congregations left the Lutheran Churches of the Reformation over issues of excommunication.

Scriptural Publications, the publishing arm of the CLC, has published an anthology, Historical Essays by David T. Mensing: The Missouri Synod's Slide into Heterodoxy, 1932–1947; The Establishment of Heterodoxy in the Missouri Synod, 1950; and The Founding of the Orthodox Lutheran Conference, 1951.

== Teachings ==
The CLC describes itself as "orthodox," with special emphasis on the inerrant, literal interpretation of the Christian Bible. It subscribes to the Book of Concord and the Brief Statement of the Doctoral Position of the Missouri Synod in its doctrinal stance.

== Purpose ==
The CLC is a gathering of churches to engage in tasks that would be hard for any one church to perform. This includes the training of future pastors in their seminary program.
