= Child life specialist =

Pediatric health care professionals

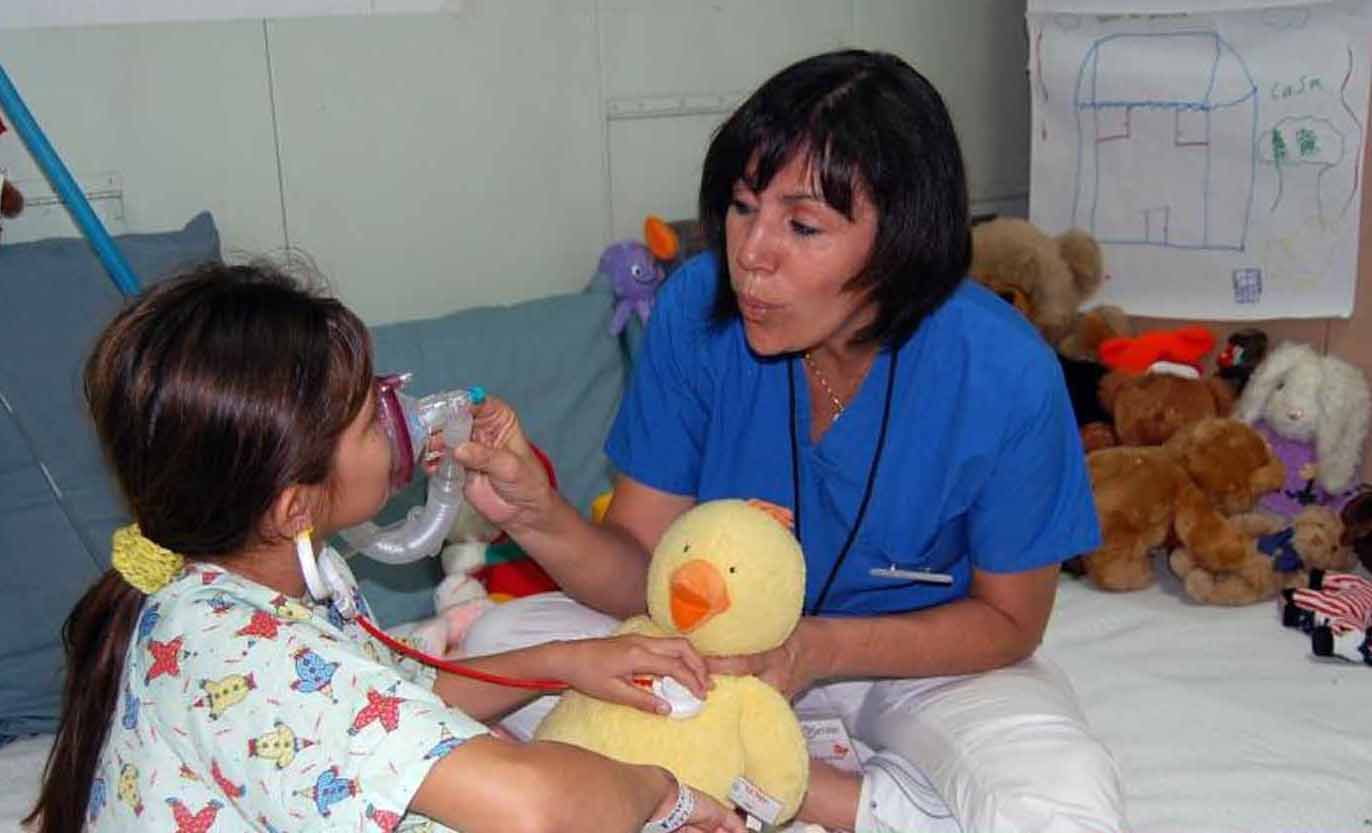
A a child life specialist with Operation Smile

Child life specialists are pediatric healthcare professionals who work with children and families in hospitals and other settings to help them cope with the challenges of hospitalization, illness, and disability. They provide children with age-appropriate preparation for medical procedures, pain management, coping strategies, and play and self-expression activities. They also provide information, support, and guidance to parents, siblings, and other family members.

== Background ==
A child life specialist in North America is a professional traditionally employed in the hospital setting. They focus on the psychosocial development of children and encourage effective coping strategies for children and their families under stress. Child life specialists recognize individuality in patients, and use a range of developmentally appropriate activities, including play, preparation for a medical procedure, education, self-expression, and family support to help cope with hospitalization, illness, or death and dying. Child life specialists are trained to take into account the cognitive, emotional, and physical development of each child in order to encourage optimum development of children facing a challenging experience, particularly one related to healthcare and hospitalization.

== History ==
The field of child life began to flourish in the United States and Canada in the early 1960s through the pioneering work of Emma Plank who trained with Maria Montessori and used the principles of child development to promote appropriate care for this special population in the hospital. Prior to this time, it was not uncommon for parents to be excluded from the pediatric wards of hospitals except for brief visitation hours, sometimes just on weekends. Today, hospitals acknowledge the special emotional and educational needs of children by providing a child-friendly environment, as well as programs that facilitate the primary role of the family, and support that encourages adjustment to the hospital and to health care through the child's growing years.

== Services ==
Child life specialists collaborate with parents and other health care professionals to meet the distinct needs of children in managing the effects of stress and trauma. Because children may feel overwhelmed, child life professionals help children gain a sense of familiarity and control of their environment through play and exploration inside the healthcare facility. Understanding that a child's well-being depends on the support of the family, they also provide information, support, and guidance to parents, siblings, and other family members.

Services that a child life specialist provides include:

- Psychological preparation for tests, surgeries, and other medical procedures
- Support during medical procedures
- Therapeutic medical and recreational play
- Sibling support
- Support for grief and bereavement
- Emergency room interventions
- Hospital pre-admission tours
- Outpatient consultation with families
- Coordination of special events, entertainment, and activities for patients and their families
- Education of caregivers, administrators, and the general public about the needs of children under stress.

Child life specialists work with patients and families in many settings, such as inpatient units, surgical areas, outpatient clinics, the pediatric intensive care unit, the emergency department, and the neonatal intensive care unit. Although child life specialists typically function in the hospital setting, their skills and training are often applied to support children and families in other settings, such as hospice, dental care, schools, specialized camps, funeral homes, or wherever children experience stress or trauma. In each of these areas, child life interventions focus on the individual needs of the child and family. The presence of a professional educated in the development of children is beneficial to the child by giving them a voice and teaching them that it is helpful to communicate with doctors to get the medical that they want in a way that is the least harmful to them, this has been proven to reduce the risk of anxiety in the hospital setting for children.

== Interventions and pain management techniques ==
Many physical, emotional, and cognitive stressors that accompany a hospital stay. Child life specialists use child-centered interventions and pain management techniques to work with the patient and family members to help them cope with hospitalization and medical procedures.

The interventions include: encouraging parent presence and participation in care; showing parent(s) how to participate and be involved; talking and communicating frequently with patients in a calm manner; advocating for pain management strategies to prevent child discomfort or pain; providing choices when appropriate; being realistic and truthful with children and adolescents; and providing "age appropriate" activities that foster a sense of accomplishment. Some pain management techniques child life specialists practice involve sharing music, favorite toys or objects, encouraging words and statements, singing, videos, comfortable positions and places, and using humor.

== Education and certification ==
The first degree program to cater specifically to the field of Child Life Specialist was Wheelock College's "The Hospitalized Child Program", which was created in 1972. By the end of the 1970s, programs at Mills College, the University of Akron, and Utica College were formed. Prior to the program at Wheelock College, child life specialists typically had degrees in fields like psychology, human development, and education and gained experience in practicum settings.

The Association of Child Life Professionals (ACLP) issues the credential of "Certified Child Life Specialist" as an organization. The ACLP maintains a list of "self-identified" Child Life programs. These programs include fully endorsed programs, undergraduate and graduate child life degree programs, minors, and child life concentrations in degree areas such as psychology, education, and human or child development. The ACLP also formally approved programs that meet certain requirements, such as having child life specialist practicum placement. These endorsed programs are offered at both the undergraduate and graduate levels and prepare graduates to complete the requirements to earn the credential of "Certified Child Life Specialist." As of 2020, the ACLP endorses programs at only 13 colleges and universities. The ACLP has been endorsing at the graduate level since 2018, and the first graduate program to earn their endorsement was the Boston University Wheelock College of Education & Human Development, the same program that created the Child Life Specialist degree in 1972 when Wheelock was an independent college.

== Becoming a child life specialist ==
Employers vary in their requirements. The CCLS credential currently is the only one in the field.

The number of child life jobs continues to rise. Virtually every children's hospital across North America has child life staff. Most children's hospitals are in large urban areas. To find a job in child life, it might be necessary to relocate to a different state. The first step to becoming a child life specialist is to receive a bachelor's degree in any field, but it is most commonly attained with an emphasis on child development. The next step is to become certified in the field with CCLS as well as an internship with 600 hours. This is the bare minimum required to become a child life specialist, and some employers will require a master's degree in family and child studies.

== Earning potential ==
Results from a child life salary survey in 2000 indicated that, "on average, child life professionals earned $35,593, but this varied based on the region of the country, position held, number of years of experience in the field, education level, certification status, and the size of the child life program. On average, individuals who were certified in child life earned $36,256, which was about $5,510 more than those who did not have the credential."

== See also ==
- Child development
- Children's hospice
- Children's hospital
- Early childhood education
- Medical social work
- Pediatrics
- Play therapy
