= Ohio Conference, United Church of Christ =

These congregations are affiliated with one of the five associations comprising the Heartland Conference of the United Church of Christ. They are listed in order of association.

Legend:
(CC)--prior to 1957, congregation was member of the Congregational Christian Churches.
(E&R)--prior to 1957, congregation was member of the Evangelical and Reformed Church.
(UCC)--congregation founded after 1957.
(union)--congregation resulting from merger of former CC, E&R, and UCC congregations.
*--indicates congregation endorses the "Open and Affirming" program of the Open and Affirming Coalition of the United Church of Christ, a recognized ministry in the UCC that advocates for the full inclusion of LGBTQ people in the church.

== Central Southeast Ohio Association ==
This association is the smallest of the five numerically; headquartered in Columbus, it occupies not only central and southeastern Ohio, but some churches in adjoining parts of West Virginia as well. Despite its small size, it is home to the Conference's oldest congregation, First Congregational in Marietta, established during the first settlements of the Northwest Territory in 1796.

- Mount Zion, Baltimore (E&R)
- St. Michael's, Baltimore (E&R)
- Trinity, Baltimore (E&R)
- Congregational, Belpre (CC)
- David's, Canal Winchester (E&R)
- Orchard Hill, Chillicothe (E&R union)*
- Mount Carmel, Clearport (E&R)
- Advent, Columbus (UCC; African-American parish)
- First Community, Columbus (CC; federated with Christian Church (Disciples of Christ))*
- First Congregational, Columbus (CC)*
- Grace, Columbus (E&R)
- North Congregational, Columbus (CC)*
- St. John's Evangelical Protestant, Columbus (E&R)*
- St. Paul, Columbus (E&R)*
- Trinity, Columbus (E&R)
- Little Muskingum Congregational, Cornerville (CC)
- Zion, Delaware (E&R)
- Community, Dublin (CC)
- St. Paul, Glenford (E&R)
- Congregational, Highwater (CC)
- Lock Federated, Homer (CC; federated with United Methodist Church)
- Grace, Lancaster (E&R)
- Highland Ridge Community, Lowell (E&R)
- First Congregational, Marietta (CC)
- Second Congregational, Marietta (CC)
- First Congregational, Marysville (CC)
- United, Mt. Sterling (UCC)
- First Congregational, Mt. Vernon (CC)
- St. John's, Newark (E&R)
- Evangelical, Portsmouth (E&R)
- Congregational, Radnor (CC)
- Heidelberg, Stoutsville (E&R)
- Trinity, Thornville (E&R)
- Zion, Thornville (E&R)
- Community, Westerville (UCC)
- Immanuel, Zanesville (E&R)
- First Congregational, Huntington, West Virginia (CC)*

== Eastern Ohio Association ==
Headquartered in Canton, the association centers around that city and the cities of Akron, Warren and Youngstown, extending up to the southernmost suburbs of Cleveland; however, most of the churches are located in small towns or in the open countryside. Most of its congregations were members of the Southeast Ohio Synod of the E&R Church prior to the UCC merger, having been established in the 19th century by German-Americans from adjoining Pennsylvania. Some of the churches have a reputation of being quite conservative theologically and socially, to the point of some conflict with association, conference, and national leadership. The EOA is the Ohio Conference's largest association, in terms of both membership and number of congregations.

- Bath, Akron (UCC)
- Christ Reformed, Akron (UCC; Hungarian-American parish)
- East Market Street, Akron (E&R)
- Emmanuel, Akron (E&R)
- Fairlawn West, Akron (CC union)
- First Congregational, Akron (CC)
- First Grace, Akron (E&R union)*
- Miller Avenue, Akron (E&R)
- Millheim, Akron (E&R)
- Trinity, Akron (E&R)
- Williard, Akron (E&R)
- First Immanuel, Alliance (E&R union)
- St. Peter's, Apple Creek (E&R)
- Congregational, Atwater (CC)
- Zion, Baltic (E&R)
- Columbia, Barberton (CC)
- Bethel, Beloit (E&R)
- St. John's, Bolivar (E&R)
- Faith, Brewster (E&R)
- Brunswick, Brunswick (UCC)
- Trinity, Canal Fulton (E&R)
- Paradise, Canfield (E&R)
- Grace, Canton (E&R)
- Market Heights, Canton (E&R)
- Trinity, Canton (E&R)
- Immanuel, Clarington (E&R)
- St. Peter's, Clinton (E&R)
- St. John's, Coshocton (E&R)
- Bethany, Cuyahoga Falls (E&R)
- Pilgrim, Cuyahoga Falls (CC)
- St. John's, Dover (E&R)
- Emanuel, Doylestown (E&R)
- Trinity, Dutch Run (E&R)
- St. Paul's, East Canton (E&R)
- Gustavus Federated, Farmville (CC, federated with United Methodist Church)
- St. Peter's, Fiat (E&R)
- Renner's St. Paul, Fresno (E&R)
- St. John's, Glenmont (E&R)*
- Zion, Hannibal (E&R)
- UCC, Hartville (E&R)
- First Congregational, Hudson (CC)
- UCC, Kent (CC)
- St. Jacob's, Leetonia (E&R)
- Trinity, Lewisville (E&R union)
- UCC Congregational, Litchfield (CC)
- Trinity, Loudonville (E&R)
- Paradise, Louisville (E&R)
- St. Michael's, Marshallville (E&R)
- Christ (Myers), Massillon (E&R)
- Grace, Massillon (E&R)
- St. John's, Massillon (E&R)
- UCC, Medina (CC)*
- Richville, Navarre (E&R)
- St. Paul, Navarre (E&R)
- Zion, New Bedford (E&R)
- Old Springfield, New Middletown (E&R)
- First, New Philadelphia (E&R)
- First Congregational, Newton Falls (CC)
- Congregational, North Canton (CC)
- Zion, North Canton (E&R)
- First Federated, North Jackson (E&R; federated with Christian Church (Disciples of Christ))
- Mt. Olivet, North Lima (E&R)
- Grace (Loyal Oak), Norton (E&R)*
- Christ, Orrville (E&R)
- St. Paul's, Port Washington (E&R)
- St. John's, Powhatan Point (E&R)
- Edinburg, Ravenna (CC)
- First Congregational, Ravenna (CC)
- First Congregational, Rootstown (CC)
- Church in Silver Lake, Silver Lake (CC)
- Zion, Steubenville (E&R)
- Grace, Stone Creek (E&R)
- Community, Stow (CC)
- St. John's, Strasburg (E&R)
- UCC, Suffield (E&R)
- First, Sugarcreek (E&R)
- Zion, Sugarcreek (E&R)
- First Congregational, Tallmadge (CC)
- Grace, Uniontown (E&R)
- Emmanuel, Valley City (E&R)
- Mt. Zwingli, Wadsworth (E&R)
- Trinity, Wadsworth (E&R)
- St. John's, Walnut Creek (E&R)
- First, Warren (E&R)
- Howland Community, Warren (UCC)
- Congregational, Windham (CC)
- St. Paul's, Woodsfield (E&R)
- Trinity, Wooster (E&R)
- Austintown Community, Youngstown (E&R)
- Faith Community, Youngstown (CC, E&R union)
- UCC, Zoar (E&R)

== Northwest Ohio Association ==
Like the Eastern Ohio Association at the opposite end of the state, this association is characteristically rural, with most of its congregations stemming from German Reformed roots. Toledo is the only major metropolitan area within its bounds. Two UCC-related colleges are located in the territory: Defiance College in Defiance and Heidelberg University in Tiffin; the schools derive from, respectively, Christian and Reformed origins. The city of Tiffin serves as headquarters for the association also.

- St. Paul, Ada (E&R)
- Union, Bascom (E&R)
- St. Paul's, Bellevue (E&R)
- Congregational Christian, Berkey (CC)
- First Congregational, Berlin Heights (CC)
- Zion, Bettsville (E&R)
- College Hill, Bloomville (E&R)
- St. John's, Bloomville (E&R)
- UCC, Bloomville (E&R)
- Emmanuel, Bluffton (E&R)
- St. John's, Bluffton (E&R)
- UCC, Buckland (CC)
- St. John's, Bucyrus (E&R)
- UCC, Cairo (CC)
- Congregational, Castalia (CC)
- Calvary, Crestline (E&R)
- Bethel Congregational Christian (Arthur), Defiance (CC)
- St. John, Defiance (CC, E&R union)
- Lytton Zion, Delta (E&R)
- Trinity, Elliston (E&R)
- St. John's, Elmore (E&R)
- First, Findlay (E&R)
- Community, Fort Seneca (E&R)
- Grace, Fostoria (E&R)
- St. John's, Fostoria (E&R)
- First, Galion (E&R)
- Peace, Galion (E&R)
- Windfall Emmanuel, Galion (E&R)
- St. John's, Genoa (E&R)
- UCC, Gomer (CC)
- Federated, Haskins (E&R; federated with American Baptist Churches USA)
- St. John's, Holgate (E&R)
- First Reformed, Kenton (E&R)
- St. John's, Kenton (E&R)
- Salem, Kenton (E&R)
- Immanuel, Kettlersville (E&R)
- Oasis on West Elm, Lima (CC)
- Congregational, Little Washington (CC; Schedule I)
- Congregational, Lyme (CC)
- First Congregational, Mansfield (CC; Schedule II)
- St. John's, Mansfield (E&R)
- First UCC Congregational, Marblehead (CC)
- First, Marion (E&R)
- Trinity, McCutchenville (E&R)
- St. John's, Milan (E&R)
- St. Peter's, Millbury (E&R)
- Congregational Community, Monroeville (CC)
- St. Paul, New Bremen (E&R)
- First, New Knoxville (E&R)
- St. Paul, Oak Harbor (E&R)
- St. Jacob's, Payne (E&R)
- St. Jacob's, Republic (E&R)
- UCC, Republic (E&R)
- St. Paul's, Rockford (E&R)
- St. Paul's, Saint Mary's (E&R)
- Emmanuel, Sandusky (E&R)
- First Congregational, Sandusky (CC)
- St. Stephen, Sandusky (E&R)
- First, Shelby (E&R)
- UCC, Spencerville (CC, E&R union)
- Congregational, Steuben (CC)
- UCC, Sycamore (E&R)
- UCC, Sylvania (CC)
- St. John's, Tiffin (E&R)
- Second, Tiffin (E&R)
- Trinity, Tiffin (E&R)
- Calvin, Toledo (E&R; Hungarian-American parish)
- Faith Community, Toledo (E&R)
- First Congregational, Toledo (CC; Schedule I)
- Nu-Vizion UCC, Toledo, Ohio (UCC)
- Memorial, Toledo (E&R)
- Park Congregational, Toledo (CC)
- Point Place, Toledo (CC)
- St. Paul's, Toledo (E&R)
- Washington, Toledo (CC)
- Emanuel, Upper Sandusky (E&R)
- Trinity, Upper Sandusky (E&R)
- St. Paul's, Van Wert (E&R)
- Congregational, Wakeman (CC)
- Peace Community, Waldo (E&R union)
- St. Paul, Wapakoneta (E&R)
- Congregational, Wauseon (CC)
- Congregational, West Millgrove (CC; Schedule II)
- UCC, Westminster (CC)

== Southwest Ohio Northern Kentucky Association ==
Possibly the most urbanized (and suburbanized) of the five associations, this group includes congregations in the Cincinnati and Dayton metropolitan areas, as well as the cities of Hamilton and Springfield. The Kentucky congregations are located across the Ohio River from Cincinnati, within a 20-mile radius. The northern part of the association contains the greatest concentration of Christian-heritage congregations in the Ohio Conference, many having been founded by settlers from North Carolina and Kentucky in the 1810s and 1820s. Some of the Cincinnati-area congregations were started originally as Evangelical Protestant churches, a German-language free-church movement that first appeared in the Pittsburgh, Pa. area in the early 19th century. In 1925, this small group joined the Congregational Christian Churches; some of its churches were also located in Indiana and St. Louis in addition to Pittsburgh and Cincinnati. Congregations deriving from this heritage will be marked (CC-EP).

- UCC, Beavercreek (E&R)
- UCC, Campbellstown (CC)
- Lost Creek, Casstown (CC)
- Faith, Cincinnati (E&R)
- First, Cincinnati (E&R)
- Fleming Road, Cincinnati (CC-EP, E&R union)
- The Gathering, Cincinnati (UCC)
- Immanuel, Cincinnati (E&R)
- Immanuel (St. Bernard), Cincinnati (E&R)
- La Amistad, Cincinnati (E&R; African-American parish)
- Martini, Cincinnati (E&R)
- Matthew's, Cincinnati (E&R)
- Philippus, Cincinnati (E&R)
- Pilgrim, Cincinnati (CC-EP)
- Pilgrim Chapel, Cincinnati (UCC; formerly a Presbyterian parish)
- St. John, Cincinnati (E&R)
- St. John Westminster Union, Cincinnati (CC-EP; federated with Presbyterian Church (USA))
- St. Luke's, Cincinnati (E&R)
- St. Paul (North College Hill), Cincinnati (E&R)
- St. Paul (Colerain), Cincinnati (CC-EP)
- St. Peter and St. Paul, Cincinnati (CC-EP union)
- St. Peter's (Pleasant Ridge), Cincinnati (E&R)
- Salem, Cincinnati (E&R)
- Trinity Hill, Cincinnati (CC, CC-EP union)
- UCC in Oakley, Cincinnati (E&R)
- Washington, Cincinnati (E&R)
- UCC, Covington (CC)
- Congregation for Reconciliation, Dayton (UCC)*
- Hawker, Dayton (E&R)
- Memorial, Dayton (E&R)
- Mt. Zion, Dayton (E&R)
- Murlin Heights, Dayton (CC)
- Polk Grove, Dayton (CC)
- St. John's, Dayton (E&R)
- Shiloh, Dayton (CC)
- Zion Memorial, Dayton (E&R)
- UCC, Eaton (CC)
- UCC (Toney Lybrook Road), Eaton (CC)
- Knob Prairie, Enon (CC)
- Trinity, Fairborn (E&R)
- UCC, Farmersville (E&R)
- St. John's, Germantown (E&R)
- St. Paul, Greenville (E&R)
- Bible Chapel, Hamersville (CC)
- Faith, Hamilton (UCC)
- First St. John, Hamilton (E&R union)
- St. John, Harrison (CC-EP)
- David's, Kettering (E&R)
- Greenmont-Oak Park Community, Kettering (CC)
- Harmony Creek, Kettering (UCC)*
- Bethany, Lebanon (CC)
- Journey, Lebanon (CC)
- UCC, Lees Creek (CC)
- First, Lewisburg (E&R)
- Nexus, Liberty Township/Fairfield (UCC)*
- Lakeview, Maineville (UCC)
- Ellerton, Miamisburg (E&R)
- Trinity, Miamisburg (E&R)
- St. Paul's, Middletown (E&R)
- Trinity, New Lebanon (E&R)
- Mt. Zion-St. Paul, New Richmond (CC, E&R union)
- Zion, Norwood (E&R)
- Congregational Christian, Piqua (CC)
- UCC, Pleasant Hill (CC)
- Congregational, Shandon (CC)
- Green View, Sidney (CC)
- Spring Creek, Sidney (CC)
- St. Paul's, Sidney (E&R)
- Plattsburg, South Charleston (CC)
- United, South Vienna (CC)
- UCC, Springboro (E&R)
- First, Springfield (CC union)
- Highlands, Springfield (CC)
- Mt. Olive, Trotwood (UCC; African-American parish)
- UCC, Trotwood (CC)
- First, Troy (CC)
- St. John's, Troy (E&R)
- St. John, West Alexandria (E&R)
- UCC, West Liberty (CC)
- UCC, West Manchester (CC)
- Nashville, West Milton (CC)
- UCC, West Milton (CC)
- St. Paul's, Alexandria, Kentucky (E&R)
- St. John, Bellevue, Kentucky (E&R)*
- Immanuel, Bromley, Kentucky (E&R)
- St. Mark, Covington, Kentucky (E&R)
- Christ, Fort Thomas, Kentucky (E&R)
- St. Paul, Fort Thomas, Kentucky (E&R)
- St. John's, Newport, Kentucky (CC-EP)

== Western Reserve Association ==
Around the turn of the 19th century, settlers from Connecticut came into the region along the southern shore of Lake Erie, bringing Congregationalism with them. Not only did churches prosper in the settlement, but other institutions bearing the Congregationalist stamp such as Oberlin College, one of the U.S.' first coeducational places of higher learning, as well. In the years preceding the Civil War, pastors and laity often became staunch proponents for the abolition of slavery; some devoted missionaries went to the South after the war to teach newly emancipated African-Americans, under the auspices of the American Missionary Association

Many, if not most, churches in this five-county association (Ashtabula, Cuyahoga, Geauga, Lake, and Lorain) carry on much of that politically and socially progressive mission and advocacy to this day. Moreover, the E&R-heritage congregations in the region were generally less inclined toward traditionalism than those elsewhere in Ohio, adding their ethnic flavor to a quintessential "Yankee" church. The association's territory encompasses virtually all of the Cleveland metropolitan area.

Because Cleveland houses the national headquarters of the UCC, many of the ordained staff members there hold their ministerial standing in this association.

- Congregational, Amherst (CC)
- St. Peter's, Amherst (E&R)
- First Congregational, Andover (CC)
- First, Austinburg (CC)
- UCC, Avon Lake (CC)
- South Haven, Bedford (CC)
- First Congregational, Berea (CC)
- UCC, Brecksville (CC)*
- UCC, Brooklyn (CC)
- UCC, Brooklyn Heights (CC)
- Congregational, Burton (CC)
- Auburn Community, Chagrin Falls (CC)
- Bainbridge Community, Chagrin Falls (UCC)
- Federated, Chagrin Falls (CC)
- Pilgrim Christian, Chardon (CC)
- Community, Chesterland (CC)*
- First Congregational, Claridon (CC)
- Archwood, Cleveland (CC, E&R union)*
- Bethany, Cleveland (E&R)
- Denison Avenue, Cleveland (CC)
- Euclid Avenue Congregational, Cleveland (CC)*
- Friedens, Cleveland (E&R)
- La Iglesia Unida de Cristo, Cleveland (UCC; Spanish language parish)
- Mt. Zion Congregational, Cleveland (CC; African-American parish)
- Pilgrim Congregational, Cleveland (CC)*
- St. Luke's, Cleveland (E&R)
- St. Paul's Community, Cleveland (CC)
- Trinity, Cleveland (E&R)*
- West Park, Cleveland (CC)
- West Side, Cleveland (E&R)
- Zion, Cleveland (E&R)*
- Union Congregational, Concord (CC)
- UCC, Conneaut (CC)
- First, Eastlake (CC)
- First Congregational, Elyria (CC)
- Lake Avenue, Elyria (CC)
- Magyar, Elyria (E&R; Hungarian-American parish)
- Pilgrim, Elyria (CC)
- St. Paul's, Elyria (E&R)
- Imani, Euclid (UCC; African-American parish)
- First Congregational, Fairport Harbor (CC)
- Pilgrim Evangelical and Reformed, Garfield Heights (E&R)
- United, Geneva (CC)
- UCC, Grand River (CC)
- Community, Hartsgrove (UCC)
- UCC, Henrietta (E&R)
- First Congregational Church of Claridon, Huntsburg (CC)
- First Congregational, Jefferson (CC)
- Old South, Kirtland (CC)
- Congregational, Lakewood (CC)
- First, Lakewood (E&R)
- Liberation, Lakewood (UCC)*
- First Congregational, Lorain (CC)*
- St. John, Lorain (E&R)
- Central Congregational, Madison (CC)
- Community, Middleburg Heights (CC)
- United Community, Newbury (UCC)
- Clague Road, North Olmsted (CC)
- First Congregational, North Ridgeville (CC)
- The First Church in Oberlin, Oberlin (CC)*
- Olmsted Community, Olmsted Falls (CC)
- First Congregational, Painesville (CC)
- Ridge Road, Parma (E&R)
- St. Paul, Parma (E&R)
- UCC, Richfield (CC)
- Faith, Richmond Heights (UCC)
- St. Peter, Seven Hills (E&R)
- Community, Shaker Heights (UCC)
- East View, Shaker Heights (CC)
- Plymouth, Shaker Heights (CC)*
- UCC, Sheffield Lake (CC)*
- St. John's, South Amherst (E&R)
- UCC, Strongsville (CC)
- First Congregational, Twinsburg (CC)
- UCC, Unionville (CC)
- Brownhelm Congregational, Vermilion (CC)
- Congregational, Vermilion (CC)
- First Congregational, Wellington (CC)
- Church of the Redeemer, Westlake (E&R)
- Dover Congregational, Westlake (CC)
- Fellowship, Wickliffe (UCC)

== See also ==
- United Church of Christ
- Michigan Conference
