= Plymouth Church of Shaker Heights =

Coordinates: 41°28′52″N 81°35′2″W

Plymouth Church United Church of Christ
- Plymouth Church; United Church of Christ
- Location: 2860 Coventry Road; Shaker Heights, Ohio 44120
- Country: United States
- Denomination: United Church of Christ
- Website: www.plymouthchurchucc.org

History
- Founded: March 25, 1850
- Dedicated: March 25, 1923

Architecture
- Architect: Charles S. Schneider
- Style: Georgian Colonial

Administration
- Division: Ohio Conference

Plymouth Church of Shaker Heights is a church located in Shaker Heights, Ohio, USA. It is a member of the United Church of Christ. The Senior Minister is Rev. Dr. Matthew Wooster. The church building, dedicated in 1923, has been designated a landmark by the Shaker Heights Landmarks Commission.

== History ==
=== Plymouth Congregational Church ===
The church traces its origins to the Free Presbyterian Church, formed in 1850 by members of the First Presbyterian Church (Old Stone Church) who objected to that church's moderate stand on slavery. It associated with the Congregational Church two years later, and on August 17, 1852 took the name Plymouth Congregational Church at the suggestion of the Rev. Henry Ward Beecher.

During the 19th Century, the church had various locations in Cleveland, including Euclid Avenue and East 9th Street (1853), Prospect Avenue near East 9th Street (1857), and Prospect Avenue and East 22nd Street (1882). In 1864, Mt. Zion Congregational Church was formed at Plymouth Church. Under the leadership of the Rev. Charles Terry Collins, Plymouth also formed Olivet Mission to work as an outreach in the Czech community. The Plymouth Church congregation disbanded in 1913 due to a loss of members and a lack of money.

=== Plymouth Church of Shaker Heights ===
The planning of Shaker Heights by the Van Sweringen Brothers provided for land for five churches. To provide one of the churches, Plymouth Church was reconstituted in 1916 with the aid of the Congregational Union as a Congregational Community Church. Worship began in Shaker Heights on September 3, 1916 using a temporary chapel, and soon thereafter planning began for a permanent building. The cornerstone for the present church was laid on June 27, 1920, and worship began in the sanctuary on February 11, 1923. The structure, designed by architect Charles S. Schneider, is considered one of the best examples of the Georgian Colonial style in the region.

In 1951 work began on the addition of two wings, one on each side of the original structure, to provide additional offices, education classrooms and a chapel. The addition was dedicated on February 15, 1953. In 1964, a new Holtkamp organ was installed in the sanctuary, and the choir loft was removed to make room for 2,851 organ pipes, while the chancel was remodeled in order to accommodate the choir.

From its inception, the church was a member of the Congregational Churches, and later the Congregational Christian Churches. It decided by congregational vote to affiliate with the United Church of Christ in 1963. Plymouth officially became a house of prayer for all people Open and Affirming congregation by congregational vote in February 2005.

== Senior Ministers ==
=== Plymouth Congregational Church ===
- Rev. Edwin H. Nevin (1850–1855)
- Rev. James C. White (1855–1861)
- Rev. Dr. Samuel L. Wolcott (1862–1874)
- Rev. Charles Terry Collins (1875–1883)
- Rev. Dr. George L. Leavitt (1885–1894)
- Rev. Livingston L. Taylor (1894–1900)
- Rev. Morgan Wood (1900–1904)
- Rev. W.H.G. Temple (1905–1906)
- Rev. Nathan M. Pratt (1906–1913)

=== Plymouth Church of Shaker Heights ===
- Rev. John Stuchell (1916–1919)
- Rev. Dr. Charles Haven Myers (1919–1929)
- Rev. Dr. Miles H. Krumbine (1929–1953)
- Rev. Dr. Robert Blakesley (1953–1973)
- Rev. Dr. David W. Rees (1974–1978)
- Rev. Gary A. Scheuer, Jr. (1979–1982)
- Rev. Dr. William G. “Skip” Holliday (1984–1994)
- Rev. Dr. James A. Antal (1995–2006)
- Rev. Dr. Shawnthea Monroe (2008–2019)
- Rev. Dr. Matthew Wooster (2021 - )
