= Statement of Faith of the United Church of Christ =

The Statement of Faith of the United Church of Christ is a Christian statement of faith written in 1959 to express the common faith of the newly founded United Church of Christ, formed in 1957 by the union of the Evangelical and Reformed Church with the Congregational Christian Churches. The statement was prepared by a 28-member commission elected at the Uniting General Synod in 1957 and was formally ratified by the Second General Synod in 1959. The commission, chaired by Elmer J. F. Arndt (Evangelical and Reformed) and vice-chaired by Douglas Horton (Congregational Christian), had equal representation from the two predecessor bodies, and included six women.

Since the original version was adopted in 1959, two further revisions of the statement have been written in order to make the statement's language more gender-inclusive (that is, to remove references to God and to humanity that are exclusively masculine). The 1976 version drafted by then-UCC president Robert Moss retains the original statement's language form, while the 1981 version transformed the language of the statement into a doxological prayer form. The statement has also been translated into Spanish.

== The 1959 Original Version ==
We believe in God, the Eternal Spirit,
Father of our Lord Jesus Christ and our Father,
and to his deeds we testify:

He calls the worlds into being,
creates man in his own image
and sets before him the ways of life and death.

He seeks in holy love to save all people from aimlessness and sin.

He judges men and nations by his righteous will
declared through prophets and apostles.

In Jesus Christ, the man of Nazareth, our crucified and risen Lord,
he has come to us
and shared our common lot,
conquering sin and death
and reconciling the world to himself.

He bestows upon us his Holy Spirit,
creating and renewing the church of Jesus Christ,
binding in covenant faithful people of all ages, tongues, and races.

He calls us into his church
to accept the cost and joy of discipleship,
to be his servants in the service of men,
to proclaim the gospel to all the world
and resist the powers of evil,
to share in Christ's baptism and eat at his table,
to join him in his passion and victory.

He promises to all who trust him
forgiveness of sins and fullness of grace,
courage in the struggle for justice and peace,
his presence in trial and rejoicing,
and eternal life in his kingdom which has no end.

Blessing and honor, glory and power be unto him.

Amen.

== The 1976 "Robert V. Moss" Version ==
This revision of the Statement of Faith was prepared by Robert V. Moss, Jr., President of the United Church of Christ from 1969–1976, in order to express the statement in more 'inclusive' language, removing all references to the masculinity of God.

We believe in God, the Eternal Spirit,
who is made known to us in Jesus our brother,
and to whose deeds we testify:

God calls the worlds into being,
creates humankind in the divine image,
and sets before us the ways of life and death.

God seeks in holy love to save all people from aimlessness and sin.

God judges all humanity and all nations by that will of righteousness
declared through prophets and apostles.

In Jesus Christ, the man of Nazareth, our crucified and risen Lord,
God has come to us
and shared our common lot,
conquering sin and death
and reconciling the whole creation to its Creator.

God bestows upon us the Holy Spirit,
creating and renewing the church of Jesus Christ,
binding in covenant faithful people of all ages, tongues, and races.

God calls us into the church
to accept the cost and joy of discipleship,
to be servants in the service of the whole human family,
to proclaim the gospel to all the world
and resist the powers of evil,
to share in Christ's baptism and eat at his table,
to join him in his passion and victory.

God promises to all who trust in the gospel
forgiveness of sins and fullness of grace,
courage in the struggle for justice and peace,
the presence of the Holy Spirit in trial and rejoicing,
and eternal life in that kingdom which has no end.

Blessing and honor, glory and power be unto God.

Amen.

== The 1981 Version "In the Form of a Doxology" ==
This version of the Statement of Faith was approved by the United Church of Christ Executive Council in 1981 for use in connection with the twenty-fifth anniversary of the denomination. It expresses another path toward shaping the statement in more 'inclusive' language, this time changing most references to God to 'you', and removing the line referring to creation.

We believe in you, O God, Eternal Spirit,
God of our Savior Jesus Christ and our God,
and to your deeds we testify:

You call the worlds into being,
create persons in your own image,
and set before each one the ways of life and death.

You seek in holy love to save all people from aimlessness and sin.

You judge people and nations by your righteous will
declared through prophets and apostles.

In Jesus Christ, the man of Nazareth, our crucified and risen Savior,
you have come to us
and shared our common lot,
conquering sin and death
and reconciling the world to yourself.

You bestow upon us your Holy Spirit,
creating and renewing the church of Jesus Christ,
binding in covenant faithful people of all ages, tongues, and races.

You call us into your church
to accept the cost and joy of discipleship,
to be your servants in the service of others,
to proclaim the gospel to all the world
and resist the powers of evil,
to share in Christ's baptism and eat at his table,
to join him in his passion and victory.

You promise to all who trust you
forgiveness of sins and fullness of grace,
courage in the struggle for justice and peace,
your presence in trial and rejoicing,
and eternal life in your realm which has no end.

Blessing and honor, glory and power be unto you.

Amen.

== En Español: La Declaración de Fe de la Iglesia Unida de Cristo ==
Creemos en Dios, el Espíritu Eterno,
Padre de nuestro Señor Jesucristo y nuestro Creador;
y de sus obras testificamos:

Dios llama los mundos para que existan,
creó al ser humano a su imagen y semejanza,
y puso ante la humanidad los caminos de la vida y la muerte.

Busca en su santo amor salvar a todas las personas de su desorientación y pecado.

Dios juzga al ser humano y a las naciones por medio de su justa voluntad
declarada a través de los profetas y los apóstoles.

En Jesucristo, el hombre de Nazaret, nuestro Señor crucificado y resucitado,
Dios ha venido y ha compartido nuestra suerte,
venció el pecado y la muerte
y reconcilió al mundo para sí mismo.

Dios nos concedió el Espíritu Santo,
que crea y renueva la iglesia de Jesucristo
y une en un pacto de fidelidad a personas de todas las edades, idiomas y razas.

Dios nos llama como iglesia
para que aceptemos el costo y la alegría del discipulado,
para que seamos sus servidores al servicio del ser humano,
para proclamar el evangelio a todo el mundo
y resistir los poderes del maligno,
para compartir el bautismo de Cristo, comer en su mesa,
y unirnos a Jesús en su pasión y victoria.

Dios promete a toda persona que confía en Jesús
el perdón de los pecados y la plenitud de su gracia,
valor en la lucha por la justicia y la paz,
su presencia en las tristezas y en las alegrías,
y vida eterna en su reino que no tiene fin.

Bendición y honor, gloria y poder sean dados a Dios.

Amén.

== Notes and references ==
Full text of the four versions of the Statement of Faith taken from: https://www.ucc.org/beliefs_statement-of-faith. The three English versions can also be found in Book of Worship: United Church of Christ, ©1986 United Church of Christ Office for Church Life and Leadership, New York (admin. Cleveland, OH: Local Church Ministries, United Church of Christ), pp. 512–514.
