= Mildred H. McAfee =

American academic and naval officer

Mildred Helen McAfee Horton
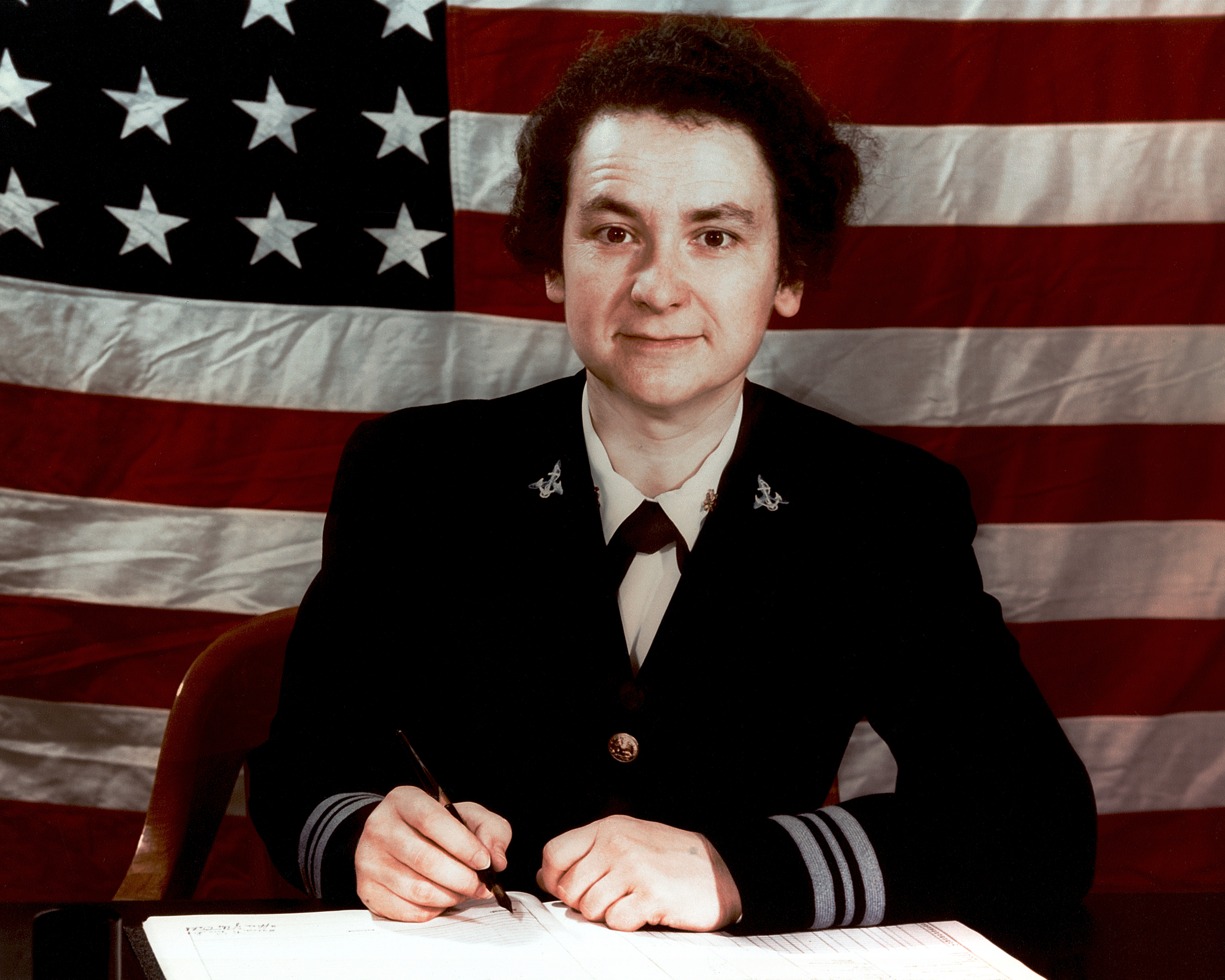
- Born: May 12, 1900; Parkville, Missouri, U.S.
- Died: September 2, 1994 (aged 94); Berlin, New Hampshire, U.S.
- Burial place: Durand Road Cemetery
- Spouse: Reverend Dr. Douglas Horton
- Military career
- Allegiance: United States
- Branch: United States Navy
- Service years: 1942-1945
- Rank: Captain
- Commands: Director of the WAVES
- Awards: Navy Distinguished Service Medal

Mildred Helen McAfee Horton (12 May 1900 – 2 September 1994) was an American academic, educator, naval officer, and religious leader. She served during World War II as first director of the WAVES (Women Accepted for Volunteer Emergency Service) in the United States Navy. She was the first woman commissioned in the U.S. Navy Reserve and the first woman to receive the Navy Distinguished Service Medal.

In addition to her distinguished military service, McAfee was also the seventh president of Wellesley College. She was a U.S. delegate to the United Nations Education, Scientific, and Cultural Organization (UNESCO) and was co-chair of President John F. Kennedy's Women's Committee for Civil Rights.

As a pioneer for women's roles in the mid 20th Century, McAfee was the first woman to serve on the boards of New York Life Insurance, the New York Public Library, and RCA. She was the first woman chair of the Board of Trustees of the University of New Hampshire. As all of her work was compelled by her faith, she was first woman president of the American Board of Commissioners for Foreign Missions and the first woman vice-president of the Federal Council of Churches and the National Council of Churches.

== Early life ==
Mildred Helen McAfee was born in Parkville, Missouri, the daughter of the Rev. Cleland Boyd McAfee and Harriet Brown. Her Presbyterian family emphasized and helped to nurture a strong faith and a high expectation of achievement which influenced her religious work later on. She graduated from Vassar College in 1920 and received her master's degree in sociology from the University of Chicago in 1928. She briefly taught at Tusculum College (now Tusculum University). McAfee was the dean of women at Centre College in 1926 before becoming dean of women at Oberlin College two years later. In 1936 she became president of Wellesley College at the age of 36, making her one of the country's youngest college presidents. McAfee retired from her position as President of Wellesley College in 1948.

McAfee is unique in the history of women leaders in the church, since she was already a young adult before the Presbyterian Church began ordaining women as elders. In fact, she had already served as vice-president of the National Council of Churches for a number of years before the first woman was ordained in the U.S. Presbyterian Church in 1956. Unlike her female contemporaries, McAfee's significance to the church, as well as her service to her country, did not come through women's organizations, Christian education, or missionary work. McAfee was deeply interested in the role of religious groups and its ability to connect people, having written her master's thesis on religious movements. Her life's work emphasized religious organizations, and she was a member of the General Council of Congregational Christian Churches.

== Military service ==
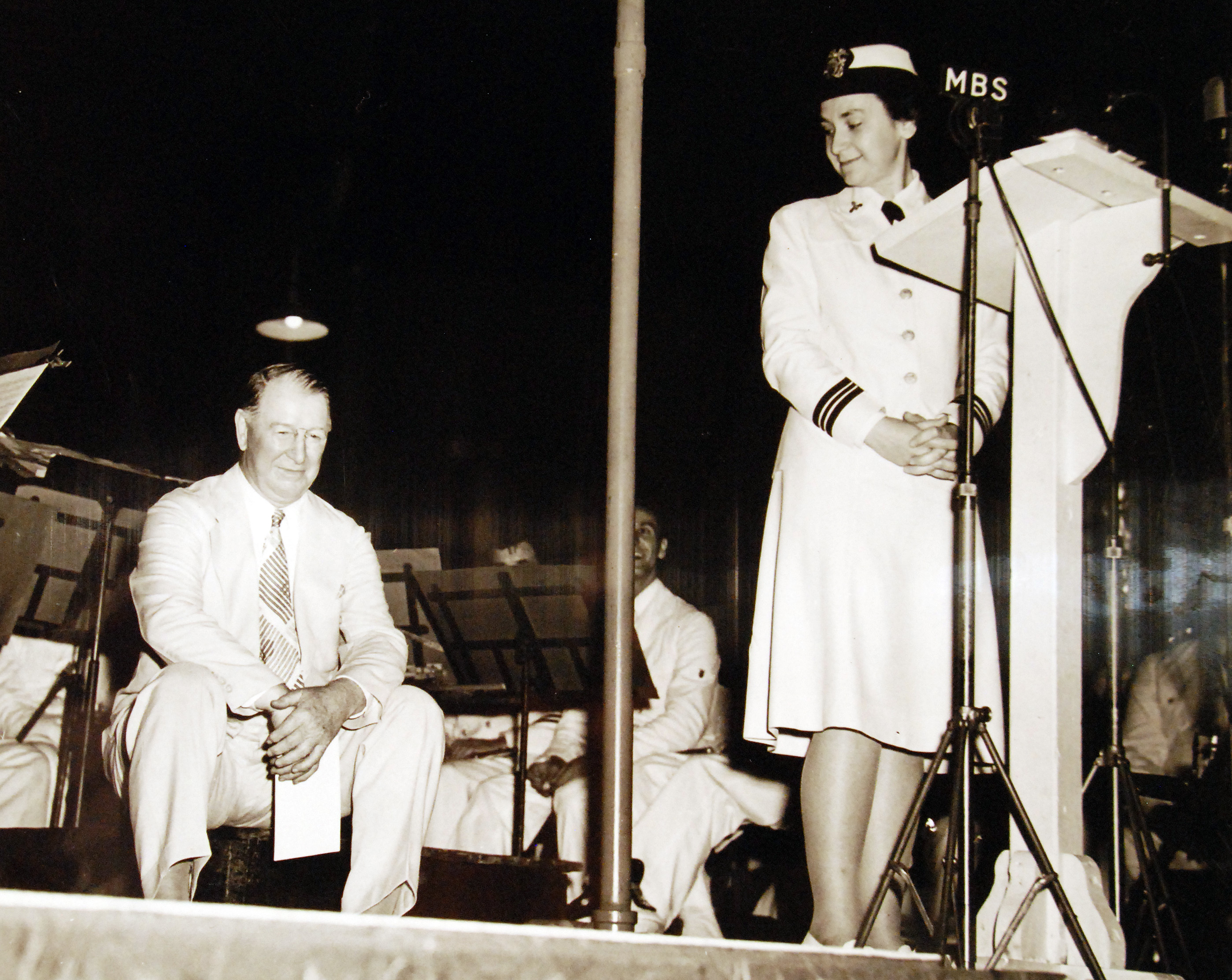
Lieutenant Commander McAfee celebrating the first anniversary of the Women's Naval Reserve in Washington, D.C., in 1943.

During World War II, McAfee took a leave of absence from Wellesley to direct the newly formed WAVES, a force that eventually numbered more than 80,000 women, both enlisted and officer. McAfee was commissioned as a lieutenant commander the following week, on 3 August, and quickly set down rules for enlisted women, including that they use only enough make-up "to look human". With others, she campaigned for WAVES to have the same pay and benefits as their male counterparts. These efforts resulted in Public Law 183, effective on 9 November 1943, which entitled all Women's Reserve personnel the allowances and benefits available to men. It also provided for one captain in the Women's Reserve; Lieutenant Commander McAfee was promoted to captain later that same month. She succeeded in integrating women of color into the U.S. Naval Reserve Officer Corps and enabled them to serve in many areas and capacities while their male counterparts were limited to serving as cooks and bakers. She ensured that women of color would be treated like any of the other WAVES and assigned as officers in various companies. During the peak of World War II, Captain McAfee commanded 82,000 women.

In 1945, McAfee was featured on the cover of Time for a job "well done".

After the war, McAfee resigned from the Naval Reserve. She was the first woman to receive the Navy Distinguished Service Medal, presented to her by Navy Secretary Forrestal on 7 November 1945. She also received the American Campaign Medal and the World War II Victory Medal.

== Personal life and death ==
In August 1945 she married the Reverend Dr. Douglas Horton (died 1968), the dean of the divinity school at Harvard University, and took on her husband's last name becoming Mildred Helen McAfee Horton. However, the work that she accomplished as a single woman, prior to her marriage, set her apart from many women of her time, whose husbands' work tended to open doors and overshadow women's accomplishments. In 1948, McAfee was asked to address the World Council of Churches, making her one of the first few women to do so. She told the council, "that the secular institutions need to be supplemented by a virile church, alert to its unique mission to keep man conscious of his relation to the loving, judging, living God."

In 1950, McAfee became a vice-president at large of the National Council of Churches, upon its founding. She had previously been serving as the first female vice-president of the Federal Council of Churches, which had been working to merge eight interdenominational boards to form the National Council. While holding this office with the National Council of Churches, she also sat on the boards of NBC and RCA in order to develop religious programming. She would later become the president of the American Board of Commissioners for Foreign Missions.

As an advocate for the ordination of women in the U.S. Presbyterian Church, McAfee wrote an article entitled "Second-Class Citizens or Partners in Policy", in which she challenged the church stating, "The crucial question about the place of women in the church is whether or not the church will accept the pattern of the secular society (with which most women are fully content) or will take the lead within its own life demonstrating the truth of ultimate worth, whether it be male or female."

McAfee Hall at Wellesley is named in her honor, as is Horton Hall at the University of New Hampshire (UNH). She was President of the UNH Board of Trustees, serving on the board from 1963 to 1974.

She died in Berlin, New Hampshire in 1994 at the age of 94, and is buried in Durand Road Cemetery.

== Sources ==
- Hendricks, Elizabeth G. (1998). "Mildred McAfee Horton (1900—1994): Portrait of a Pathbreaking Christian Leader". The Journal of Presbyterian History. 76 (2): 159–174. JSTOR 23335371. INIST 2033415.
