= Afro-Christian Convention =

Former African American Protestant Christian denomination

The Afro-Christian Conference was an African American Protestant Christian denomination that existed from 1892 to 1950. It was concentrated in the Southern United States, especially North Carolina and Virginia.

The Convention was part of the Christian movement, which disavowed creeds and denominational names. The first conference of Afro-Christians was organized in 1866 in North Carolina, and in 1892 several such regional conferences organized to found the Afro-Christian Convention. In 1880 the Convention established a school in Franklinton, North Carolina, which in 1891 adopted the name Franklinton Christian College. The college closed in 1930 due to the Great Depression and the site now hosts Franklinton Center at Bricks. By the time of the 1931 merger between the Christians and Congregationalists to form the Congregational Christian Churches (CCC), the Convention had been associated with the white Christians. Nonetheless it remained mostly separate from both white Christians and black Congregationalist churches, the latter associated with the American Missionary Association.

In June 1950, the churches in the Convention joined with the Black Congregational churches to form the Convention of the South within the CCC. In 1957 the CCC merged with the Evangelical and Reformed Church to found the United Church of Christ (UCC), and on September 30, 1965 the Convention of the South was dissolved and the churches therein placed in the UCC's new Southern Conference, which included white Congregationalist and Evangelical and Reformed churches.
