= John H. Thomas =

American theologian

John H. Thomas was the General Minister and President of the United Church of Christ (UCC), a mainline Protestant Christian denomination. Elected in 1999, he served as one of five officers of the UCC who comprise the Collegium of Officers, which oversees national ministries. As General Minister and President, Thomas was the premier spokesperson for the United Church of Christ, officially representing the UCC in ecumenical and interfaith relations. His term ended in October 2009.

Chicago Theological Seminary has appointed Thomas as a senior adviser to the president and visiting professor in church ministries, effective January 1, 2010.

Prior to his work as General Minister and President of the UCC, Rev. Thomas was Pastor of the First United Church of Christ of Easton, PA, from 1982 to January 5, 1992, where he was respected and well liked.
