= Michigan Conference of the United Church of Christ =

Regional organization

The Michigan Conference of the United Church of Christ (MCUCC) is the regional body of the United Church of Christ (UCC) within the U.S. state of Michigan. It maintains headquarters in East Lansing and serves 145 UCC congregations throughout the state.

== History ==
The United Church of Christ began on June 25, 1957 in the union between the Congregational Christian Churches and the Evangelical and Reformed Church. Dr. James E. Wagner, the president of the Evangelical and Reformed General Synod, and Dr. Fred E. Hoskins, the Minister of the Congregational Christian General Council, were elected co-presidents of the new denomination. This union was the first step in uniting these denominations a statewide level.

At the May 22, 1963 Special Meeting, the Michigan-Indiana Synod of the Evangelical and Reformed Church and the Congregational Christian Churches voted to officially become a Conference within the United Church of Christ. The first official annual meeting of the Michigan Conference took place in Ann Arbor at the Bethlehem United Church of Christ on May 19–20, 1964. Rev. Duane N. Vore was elected as the Conference Minister.

The Michigan Conference of The United Church of Christ saw many changes during their first few years starting out. Between 1965 and 1966 the conference center was built on a 16-acre lot on the corner of M-87 and Park Lake Road in East Lansing, Michigan. The Conference also came to own Camp Talahi in Howell.

During the 1970s the Michigan Conference joined with the United Church of Christ nationally to participate in the 17/76 Achievement Fund. The goal was to raise 17 million dollars by 1976 to aid six historic AMA Negro Colleges in the South. The UCC pledged $470,985 to the cause. This decade marked the installation of the second Conference Minister, John Rogers. This was one of the many changes in personnel for the Conference, which was accompanied by a welcome change in Conference structure. The 12 associations within the Michigan UCC were consolidated into larger, more effective units.

Staff and structure changes continued into the 1980s. In 1982, a new task force was formed titled the “Peace with Power and Justice for All People,” and three new staff members were introduced to the Conference. In 1982 the Rev. Gail M. Hendrix became the Associate Conference Minister for the West Area, Rev. Raymond T. Sparrow became the Associate Conference Minister for Outdoor Ministries and Youth, and Rev. Jimmie L. Sawyer became the Associate Conference Minister for the East Area.

In 1984, a National UCC Capital Fund Campaign for New Initiatives in Church Development was adopted by the Michigan Conference. The Conference implemented the campaign with a special focus on raising funds for new church starts and Michigan camping facilities. As a result of the national and state effort there were three new church starts in Michigan. The following year the Council for Planning and Correlation appointed overlapping Task Groups of five people to function for two years in overseeing the Mission Statement Implementation Plan that had been adopted earlier in 1985. The Systematic Training for Effective Ministries (STEM) also came into being during 1985. This program was looked upon as the answer to the need for trained lay persons to serve small churches as lay ministers or Christian educators, and to train church members to become better able to serve effectively in their churches.

On July 31, 1987, John Rogers resigned as the Conference Minister to accept the call as senior pastor of the First Congregational Church of Portland, Oregon. Rev. Don R. Yungclas was invited to serve as Interim Conference Minister. At the 1988 Annual Meeting Rev. Marwood E. Rettig was elected Conference Minister. During this meeting new bylaws were approved for yet another reorganization of the Conference to enable associations to better live out the Michigan UCC mission.

In 1990, “Michigan Grow” was inaugurated as the first in a five-year “evangelism event emphasis.” The program was jointly sponsored by the Michigan Conference UCC and the Michigan Region of the Christian Church. Its format included presenting six programs during a three-hour session held successively in six different areas in the state. The first ever gathering of United Church of Christ members from across the country for the purpose of inspiration, worship, education and fellowship also took place in 1990; this meeting was called “Faith Works.”

In April 1991, the Michigan Conference entered into the “Evangelism Institutes,” program. The Conference made a three-year commitment to evangelism and membership growth that included a planning team to attend an Evangelism Institute once each year. Twenty-four Michigan Churches attended the first year of the Institutes.

The 1991 Annual Meeting of the Michigan Conference held at Olivet College included a celebration of the 150th Anniversary year for the Michigan Conference. This year also marked the implementation of “Called to Care.” This program allowed UCC church members to improve their care giving skills on the basis that care, and giving care, is ministry to all of God's people.

In 1992, the Annual Meeting was the first to be held jointly with Disciples of Christ, coining the term "JAMRA", which stands for the Joint Annual Meeting/Regional Assembly. This year also marked the First Annual Camp Talahi Benefit Golf Tournament.

== Conference ministers ==
- 1963–1976: Rev. Dr. Duane N. Vore, Conference Minister and Chief Executive Officer
- 1976–1987: Rev. Dr. John M. Rogers, Conference Minister
- 1988–1992: Rev. Dr. Marwood E. Rettig, Conference Minister
- 1996–2008: Rev. Dr. Kent J. Ulery, Conference Minister
- 2012–: Rev. Dr. S. C. Campbell Lovett, Conference Minister
- 2022-present: Rev. Dr. Lillian Daniel, Conference Minister

== Associations ==
There are six modern Conference Associations in the Michigan Conference UCC: the Covenant Association, which is located in central Michigan; the Detroit Metropolitan Association, located in the southeast section of the lower peninsula; the Eastern Association, located in the thumb; the Grand West Association, which is located in the central section toward the west of the state; the Southwest Association, which spans from I-69 to Lake Michigan; and the United Northern Association, which spans from where the great woods begin in Clare all the way to the Upper Peninsula. These units are a result of consolidating the original twelve associations within the Conference. Many of these associations were reorganized as a result of the union to form the Michigan Conference; each is listed in alphabetical order below:

Conference Name	Organized Date	Reorganized Date
Ann Arbor-Jackson	May 17, 1842	February 2, 1964
Central	October 14, 1845	September 13, 1964
Cheboygan	February 13, 1878	September 13, 1964
Delta	August 29, 1888	September 1963
Detroit Metropolitan	May 4, 1887	May 12, 1964
Eastern	February 12, 1840	September 1, 1964
Grand Rapids	January 8, 1856	July 7, 1964
Grand Traverse	January 1, 1863	-
Lake Superior	August 12, 1879	-
Muskegon	January 13, 1864	Reorganized as West Michigan on September 19, 1964
Kalamazoo	June 1, 1849	Reorganized as Southwest Michigan on April 26, 1964
Sault Ste. Marie	March 18, 1880	-

== Bibliography ==
- Wenstrom, Donald A. (2001). A history of the Michigan Conference United Church of Christ and its parent denominations, 1842-1992. East Lansing: Michigan Conference of the United Church of Chris.
