= Charles Sumner Schneider =

American architect

Charles Sumner Schneider (1874 – March 10, 1932) was an American architect active in Ohio.

Schneider was born in Cleveland to Rev. William F. and Amanda (Esslinger) Schneider. He received his first architectural training in the office of Meade & Garfield, and afterwards studied at the École des Beaux-Arts in Paris. He joined the Cleveland architectural office of William Watterson in 1901, and began independent practice in 1908. Schneider married Georgia P. Leighton on 14 September 1904; together they had 4 children. He died in Cleveland and was buried in Lake View Cemetery.

During his architectural career Schneider designed a number of offices, academic buildings, and residences. Perhaps his best-known work is Stan Hywet (1915), an Akron mansion based on several English country houses. His academic work includes the ornate Italian Renaissance-style Rockefeller Physics Building (1905) and Quad Hall (1925) at the Case School of Applied Science (now Case Western Reserve University), and Austin Hall at Ohio Wesleyan University. Other work includes the classical Brotherhood of Railroad Trainmen Building (1921), Plymouth Church in Shaker Heights (1923), and the office building of the Cleveland Baseball Company at League Park.
