= Fort Seneca, Ohio =

- CDP
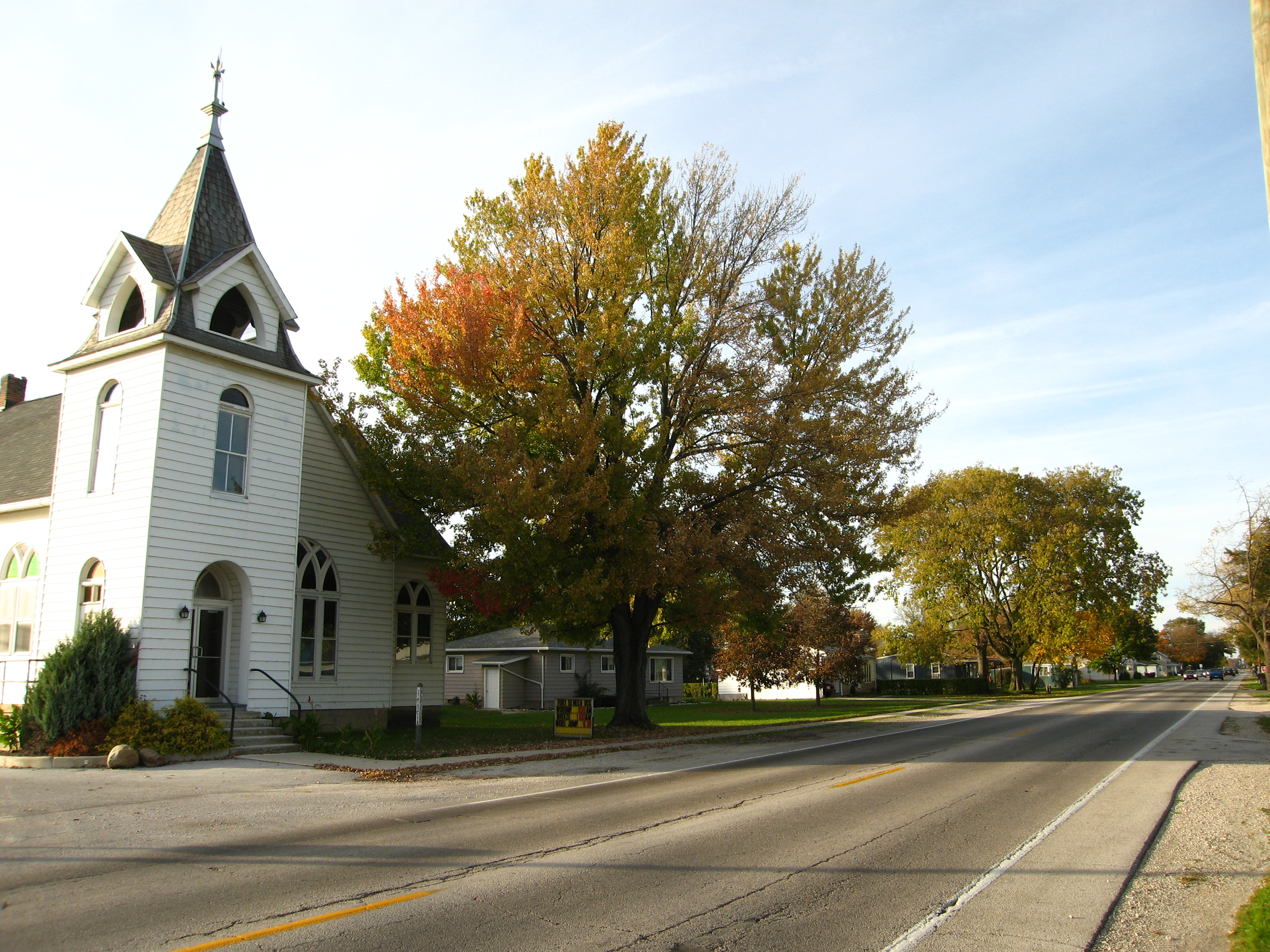
- Fort Seneca as seen from Fremont-Tiffin Road, looking north on State Route 53.
- Interactive map of Fort Seneca, Ohio
- Coordinates: 41°12′16″N 83°10′04″W
- Country: United States
- State: Ohio
- County: Seneca County

Area
  - Total: 0.63 sq mi (1.62 km^{2})
  - Land: 0.63 sq mi (1.62 km^{2})
  - Water: 0 sq mi (0.00 km^{2})
- Elevation: 699 ft (213 m)

Population (2020)
  - Total: 230
  - Density: 366.8/sq mi (141.61/km^{2})
- Time zone: UTC-5 (Eastern (EST))
  - Summer (DST): UTC-4 (EDT)
- ZIP code: 44883
- Area code: 419
- GNIS feature ID: 2628892

Fort Seneca is a census-designated place in Pleasant Township, Seneca County, Ohio, United States. It is located on State Route 53, approximately 6 miles (9.7 km) North of Tiffin. The population was 230 at the 2020 census.

== History ==
Fort Seneca was built nearby in Jul. 1813 by Gen. William Henry Harrison during the War of 1812. The community of Fort Seneca was platted in 1836, and named after Old Fort Seneca, which was located 2 miles away from the present town site.

Fort Seneca had a post office, with the ZIP code of 44829 until 1998. The post office was opened on December 15, 1821.

== Demographics ==
Historical population
Census	Pop.	Note	%±
2020	230		—
U.S. Decennial Census
