= Bloomville, Ohio =

- Village
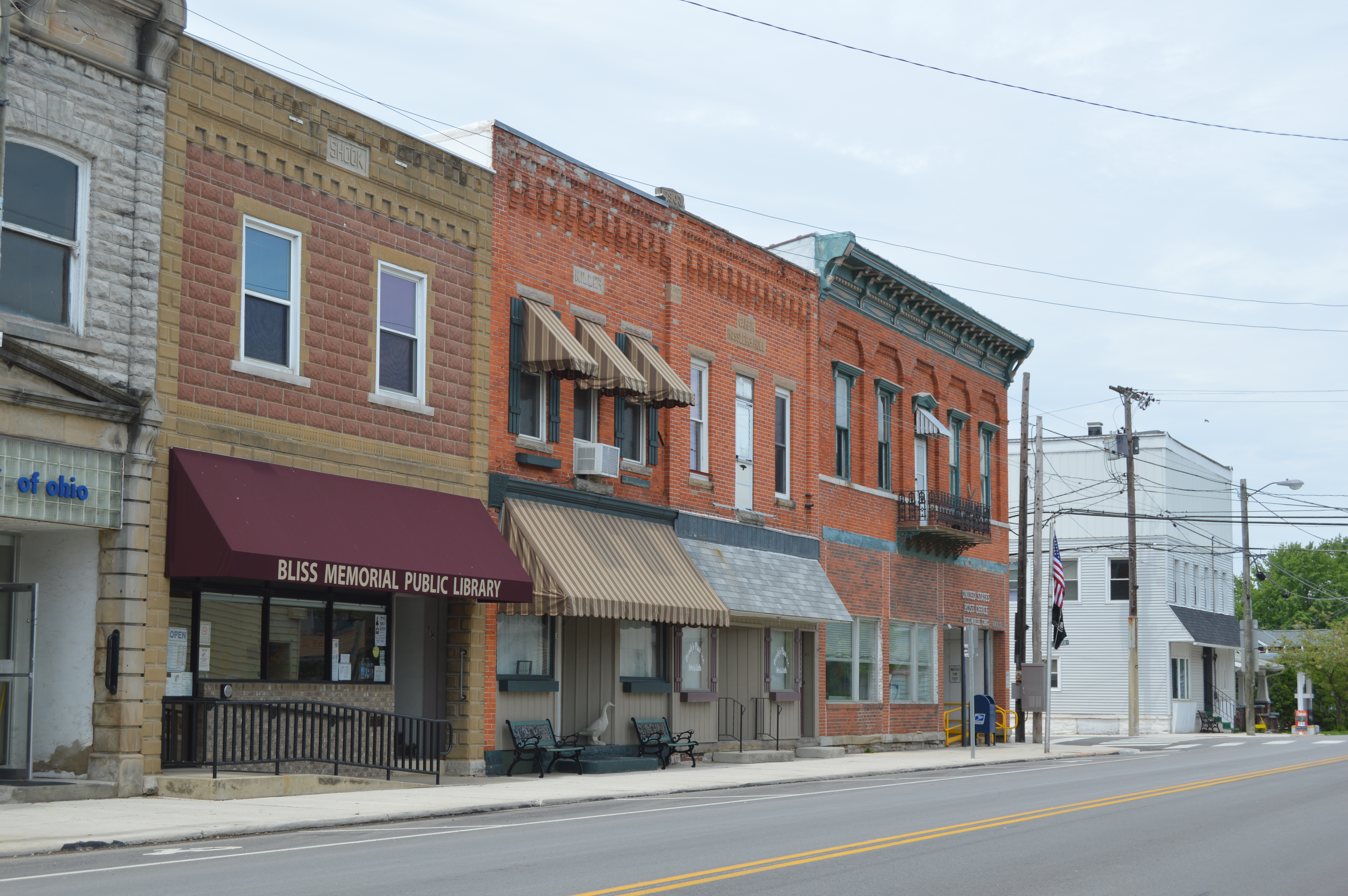
- Marion Street

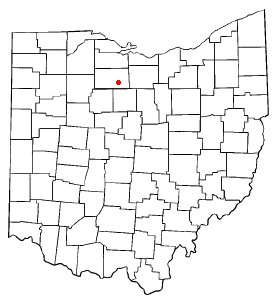
- Location of Bloomville, Ohio

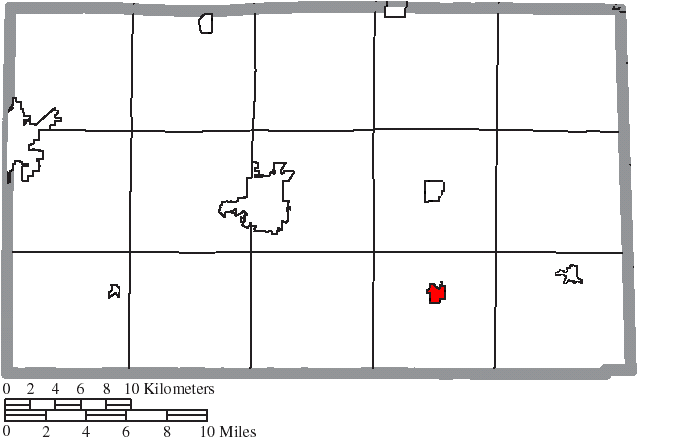
- Location of Bloomville in Seneca County
- Coordinates: 41°03′05″N 83°00′49″W
- Country: United States
- State: Ohio
- County: Seneca

Government
  - Type: Village council

Area
  - Total: 0.60 sq mi (1.56 km^{2})
  - Land: 0.60 sq mi (1.56 km^{2})
  - Water: 0 sq mi (0.00 km^{2})
- Elevation: 915 ft (279 m)

Population (2020)
  - Total: 867
  - Estimate (2023): 853
  - Density: 1,436.8/sq mi (554.75/km^{2})
- Time zone: UTC-5 (Eastern (EST))
  - Summer (DST): UTC-4 (EDT)
- ZIP code: 44818
- Area code: 419
- FIPS code: 39-07286
- GNIS feature ID: 2398141

Bloomville is a village in Seneca County, Ohio, United States. The population was 867 at the 2020 census.

== History ==
The first settlement at Bloomville was made in 1822. Bloomville was laid out in 1837. It was incorporated as a village in 1871. On November 5, 1889, the village suffered from a major fire.

== Geography ==
According to the United States Census Bureau, the village has a total area of 0.60 square miles (1.55 km^{2}), all land.

== Demographics ==
Historical population
Census	Pop.	Note	%±
1880	689		—
1890	758		10.0%
1900	819		8.0%
1910	754		−7.9%
1920	645		−14.5%
1930	700		8.5%
1940	750		7.1%
1950	759		1.2%
1960	836		10.1%
1970	884		5.7%
1980	1,019		15.3%
1990	949		−6.9%
2000	1,045		10.1%
2010	956		−8.5%
2020	867		−9.3%
2023 (est.)	853	▼	−1.6%
U.S. Decennial Census

=== 2010 census ===
As of the census of 2010, there were 956 people, 349 households, and 229 families living in the village. The population density was 1,593.3 inhabitants per square mile (615.2/km^{2}). There were 382 housing units at an average density of 636.7 per square mile (245.8/km^{2}). The racial makeup of the village was 97.4% White, 0.2% African American, 0.1% Native American, 0.7% from other races, and 1.6% from two or more races. Hispanic or Latino of any race were 2.1% of the population.

There were 349 households, of which 39.5% had children under the age of 18 living with them, 46.1% were married couples living together, 12.6% had a female householder with no husband present, 6.9% had a male householder with no wife present, and 34.4% were non-families. 29.8% of all households were made up of individuals, and 13.5% had someone living alone who was 65 years of age or older. The average household size was 2.66 and the average family size was 3.29.

The median age in the village was 34.3 years. 29.7% of residents were under the age of 18; 8.4% were between the ages of 18 and 24; 25.3% were from 25 to 44; 22.5% were from 45 to 64; and 14.2% were 65 years of age or older. The gender makeup of the village was 50.5% male and 49.5% female.

=== 2000 census ===
As of the census of 2000, there were 1,045 people, 366 households, and 281 families living in the village. The population density was 1,720.3 inhabitants per square mile (664.2/km^{2}). There were 390 housing units at an average density of 642.0 per square mile (247.9/km^{2}). The racial makeup of the village was 97.51% White, 0.38% African American, 0.29% Native American, 1.15% from other races, and 0.67% from two or more races. Hispanic or Latino of any race were 3.06% of the population.

There were 366 households, out of which 42.1% had children under the age of 18 living with them, 59.6% were married couples living together, 12.8% had a female householder with no husband present, and 23.2% were non-families. 21.0% of all households were made up of individuals, and 11.5% had someone living alone who was 65 years of age or older. The average household size was 2.78 and the average family size was 3.18.

In the village, the population was spread out, with 31.1% under the age of 18, 9.2% from 18 to 24, 26.3% from 25 to 44, 19.0% from 45 to 64, and 14.4% who were 65 years of age or older. The median age was 32 years. For every 100 females there were 89.0 males. For every 100 females age 18 and over, there were 84.1 males.

The median income for a household in the village was $36,250, and the median income for a family was $39,519. Males had a median income of $30,223 versus $21,902 for females. The per capita income for the village was $13,396. About 5.0% of families and 5.8% of the population were below the poverty line, including 5.5% of those under age 18 and 6.6% of those age 65 or over.
