= Open and Affirming Coalition UCC =

Designation in the United Church of Christ

- Classification: Progressive Christianity
- Theology: Reformed
- Associations: United Church of Christ
- Region: United States
- Headquarters: Cleveland, Ohio
- Origin: 1972
- Congregations: 1,743
- Seminaries: 8
- Official website: openandaffirming.org

Open and Affirming Coalition UCC is an inclusive Reformed churches network. It is affiliated with the United Church of Christ, and affirms the full inclusion of gay, lesbian, bisexual, transgender and non-binary persons (LGBTQ) in the church's life and ministry. In 2025, it has 1,743 churches and 8 seminaries affiliated with it.

== History ==
The organization has its origins in the founding of the UCC Gay Caucus by William R. Johnson and 35 people, the first openly gay minister ordained in the United Church of Christ in 1972. In 1973, it was renamed UCC Coalition for Lesbian/Gay Concerns and made its first appearance at the General Synod in St. Louis, Missouri for the inclusion of gay and lesbian people in the Church.

In 1985 the United Church of Christ's General Synod adopted a resolution encouraging UCC congregations to welcome (or consider welcoming) gay, lesbian, and bisexual people after a time of dialogue, study and prayer. Following later General Synod resolutions affirming transgender members of the church, the welcome was extended so that, today, an ONA covenant typically welcomes members of any sexual orientation or gender identity and expression. An ONA church is expected to commit to the inclusion of LGBTQ members in the sacraments and ministries of the church, including marriage.

The 1985 resolution had no legislative authority over individual congregations, which are autonomous, but set in motion a movement that spread rapidly throughout the church.

The resolution allocated no funds to support an ONA program in the UCC's national office. As a result, the UCC Coalition for LGBT Concerns launched an ONA program in 1987, led by the Rev. Ann B. Day and Donna Enberg, which raised funds from individual contributors, sympathetic congregations and private foundations. To this day, the official registry of ONA congregations is managed by the Coalition (since renamed the Open and Affirming Coalition), a voluntary non-profit organization independent from the church's national office, although it works in close partnership with the UCC's national ministries. The Coalition publishes a wide range of resources to support congregations considering an ONA commitment and to help existing ONA churches build relationships with the LGBTQ community.

New York City's Riverside Church, under the pastoral leadership of the late Rev. William Sloane Coffin, was the first in the UCC to be listed as Open and Affirming in 1987.

In 2014, it was renamed Open and Affirming Coalition of the United Church of Christ.

In 2025, it has 1,743 churches and 8 seminaries.

Twenty-one of the UCC's 38 regional conferences, most new church starts, all seven seminaries affiliated with the UCC and several UCC-related campus ministries have adopted ONA statements, or "covenants." Other ministries in the UCC, like the Council for Health and Human Service Ministries and the Order of Corpus Christi have also adopted ONA covenants.

== Programs ==
The Open and Affirming program is administered by the UCC Open and Affirming Coalition, which supports congregations and other church settings as they consider the adoption of an ONA "covenant" and maintains the official registry of ONA congregations and ministries. The Coalition encourages UCC congregations, campus ministries, seminaries, regional bodies and other settings of the church to engage their members in serious study of sexual orientation and gender identity and to declare publicly their full welcome and inclusion of LGBTQ people.

== Beliefs ==
=== Marriage ===
The network support blessings of same-sex marriage.

== Opposition ==
In 2015, 75 conservative congregations founded the UCC Faithful and Welcoming Churches organization, which affirms marriage as a relationship between a man and woman.

== See also ==
- List of Christian denominations affirming LGBTQ people
