= United Church of Christ =

Protestant Christian denomination

- Classification: Mainline Protestant
- Orientation: United church (Anabaptist, Congregationalist, Continental Reformed, Lutheran, Restorationist)
- Scripture: Protestant Bible
- Theology: Ecumenical (including Liberal, Liberationist, Progressive, Reformed, and Restorationist)
- Polity: "Covenantal" (Mix of Congregational and Presbyterian)
- General Minister and President: Karen Georgia Thompson
- Full communion: UEK (since 1981); CC (DOC) (since 1989); ELCA (since 1997); PCUSA (since 1997); RCA (since 1997); UCC (since 2015)
- Associations: Christian Churches Together; Churches Uniting In Christ; National Council of Churches; World Communion of Reformed Churches; World Council of Churches
- Region: United States
- Headquarters: Cleveland, Ohio, U.S.
- Origin: June 25, 1957; 69 years ago
- Merger of: Evangelical and Reformed Church; Congregational Christian Churches; Afro-Christian Convention
- Separations: Evangelical Association of Reformed and Congregational Christian Churches
- Congregations: 4,372 (2025)
- Members: 651,659 (2025)
- Official website: www.ucc.org
- Logo

The United Church of Christ (UCC) is a Mainline Protestant Christian denomination based in the United States. It is a United Protestant denomination that formed as the result of a merger of the General Council of the Congregational Christian Churches, the Evangelical and Reformed Church, and the Afro-Christian Convention, denominations which were themselves the result of earlier unions of churches in the Anabaptist, Congregational, Continental Reformed, Lutheran, and Restorationist traditions. The churches that came into the UCC through the General Council of Congregational Christian Churches can trace their historic roots back to the New England Puritans. Moreover, it also subsumed the third-largest Calvinist group in the country, the German Reformed.

The General Council of the Congregational Christian Churches, Evangelical and Reformed Church, and the Afro-Christian Convention, united on June 25, 1957, to form the UCC. The UCC has approximately 4,372 congregations and 651,659 members.

The UCC maintains full communion with other Protestant denominations, and many of its congregations practice open communion. The denomination emphasizes participation in worldwide interfaith and ecumenical efforts. The national leadership and General Synod of the UCC have historically favored theologically liberal positions on issues such as gender, LGBTQ affirmation, and abortion. UCC congregations are independent in matters of doctrine and ministry and may not necessarily support the national body's theological or moral stances. Common theological traditions in the UCC include Liberal, Liberation, Progressive, Reformed, and Restorationist. The UCC self-describes as "an extremely pluralistic and diverse denomination", emphasizing Christian unity.

== History ==
The United Church of Christ was formed when three Protestant churches, the Evangelical and Reformed Church, the General Council of the Congregational Christian Churches and the Afro-Christian Convention united on June 25, 1957. The vote on the resolution had no dissenting votes from the delegates gathered. This union adopted an earlier general statement of unity between the two denominations, the 1943 "Basis of Union". At the time, the UCC claimed about two million members.

On January 23, 1959, 30 theologians, pastors, and laymen finished writing the UCC's Statement of Faith. The UCC adopted its constitution and by-laws on July 4, 1961. The Constitution gives autonomy to local churches, and it provides for a representative-type of governance of regional and national church organizations. Prior to the vote, 3,669 of 4,036 Congregational churches voted to accept it. There were 367 Congregational Christian churches or about 9% that decided to stay out. Some of those churches challenged it in court, saying that it was contrary to traditional Congregational principles. Their court challenges were unsuccessful. The vote to adopt the Constitution and by-laws was unanimous among the delegates that met in Philadelphia on July 4, 1961.

The Afro-Christian Convention was a long-ignored "Fifth Stream" that had been neglected voice or visibility, resulting in an official apology from the denomination at the 2023 General Synod in Indianapolis, Indiana.

== Beliefs ==
There is no UCC hierarchy or body that can impose any doctrine or form of worship onto the individual congregations within the UCC. While individual congregations are supposed to hold guidance from the General Synod "in the highest regard", the UCC's constitution requires that the "autonomy of the Local Church is inherent and modifiable only by its own action".

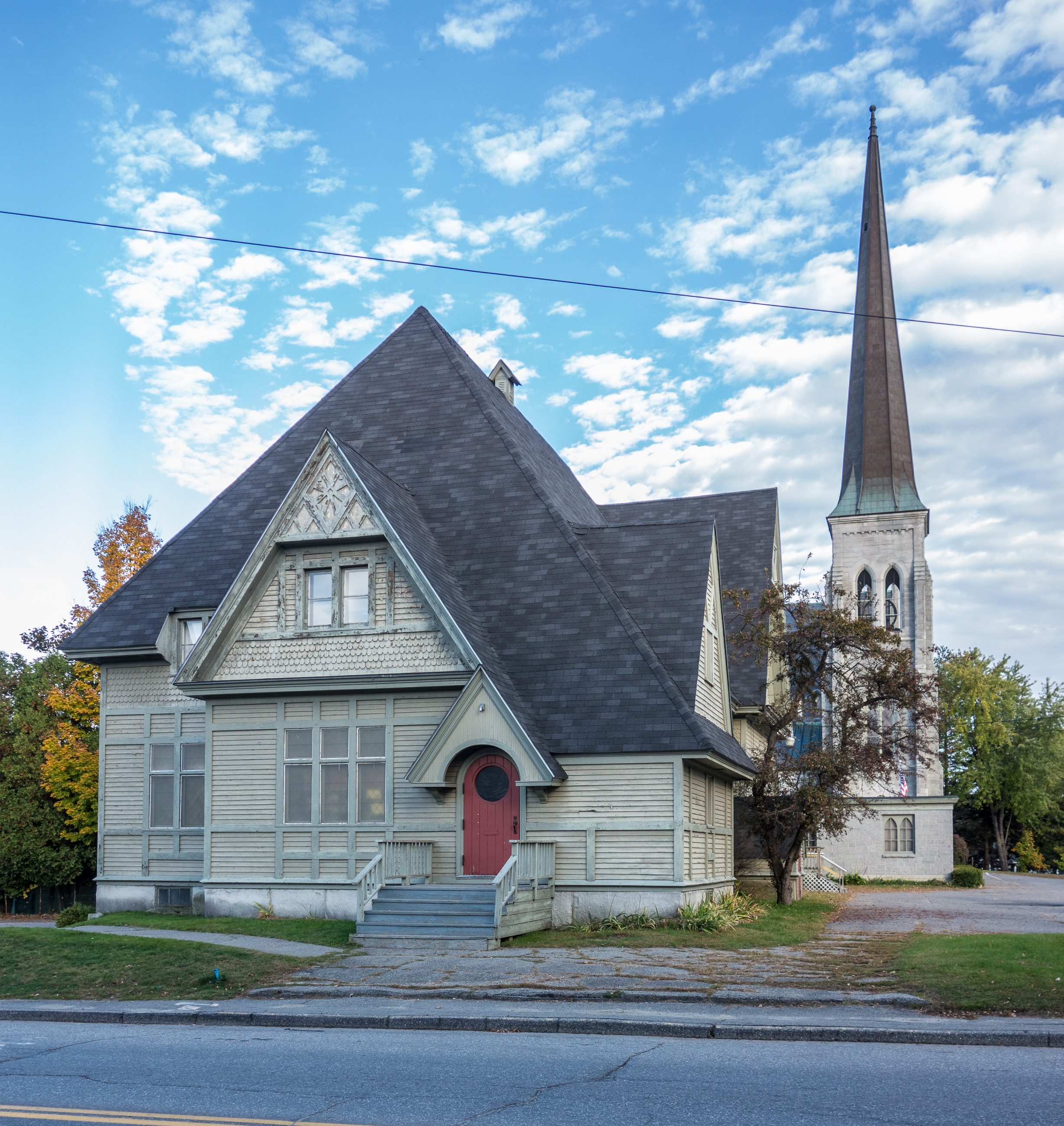
South Parish Congregational Church and Parish House in Augusta, Maine, in 2013

Within this locally focused structure, however, there are central beliefs common to the UCC. The UCC often uses four words to describe itself: "Christian, Reformed, Congregational and Evangelical". While the UCC refers to its Evangelical characteristics, it springs from (and is considered part of) mainline Protestantism as opposed to some doctrines in Evangelicalism. The word evangelical, in this case, more closely corresponds with the original Lutheran origins meaning "of the gospel" as opposed to the Evangelical use of the word. The UCC is generally theologically liberal, and the denomination notes that the "Bible, though written in specific historical times and places, still speaks to us in our present condition".

The motto of the United Church of Christ comes from John 17:21: "That they may all be one". The denomination's official literature uses broad doctrinal parameters, emphasizing freedom of individual conscience and local church autonomy.

=== Creeds and confessions ===
The United Church of Christ does not make official use of any creeds or confessions of faith that are binding on its congregations or individual members. Despite its historic ties to Reformed Congregationalism, the UCC uses neither the Savoy Declaration nor the Cambridge Platform as governing or confessional documents. The UCC instead views creeds and confessions as "testimonies, but not tests of the faith".

The UCC does use its statement of faith written in 1959, however the denomination does not require congregations, ministers, or members to affirm its doctrines. The statement affirms belief in God the Father and Jesus Christ, creation of the world and of man by God, the desire of God to save all people from sin, that God's judgement and will is declared through prophets and apostles, the crucifixion and resurrection of Jesus, the bestowment of the Holy Spirit, the church, baptism and the Lord's Supper, forgiveness of sins, and eternal life. The statement of faith affirms belief in the "triune God." However, the statement does not explicitly affirm Trinitarian doctrine, Jesus' virgin birth, belief in the Bible, or any Protestant distinctives. The denomination also uses a revised version written in 1976 by UCC president Robert V. Moss that made the statement's language more gender-inclusive by removing references to God as Father and removing exclusively masculine language to refer to God and humanity. It also changes the opening line from referring to Jesus as "our Lord Jesus Christ" to "Jesus our brother". Additionally, the denomination also uses a 1981 version of the statement written in the form of a doxology and a Spanish-language translation of the traditional version.

=== Marriage ===
A 2005 resolution, "In support of equal marriage rights for all", was supported by an estimated 80 percent of delegates to the church's 2005 General Synod, which made the United Church of Christ the first major Christian deliberative body in the U.S. to endorse blessings of same-sex marriage. The resolution was one of 32 actions by the General Synod and other national bodies, beginning in 1969, to support civil rights for LGBTQ persons and urge their full inclusion in the life of the church.

On April 28, 2014, the UCC filed a lawsuit against North Carolina for not permitting same-sex marriage, the first faith-based challenge to same-sex marriage bans in the US. In the lawsuit, the church argued that prohibiting same-sex marriages violated the freedom of religion as the ban forced ministers supportive of same-sex marriage to not act on their beliefs.

Opponents included the Iglesia Evangelica Unida de Puerto Rico (United Evangelical Church in Puerto Rico), three-fourths of which voted to withdraw from the UCC after the 2005 General Synod vote. The Biblical Witness Fellowship, a small conservative evangelical organization within the denomination, opposes the denomination's growing support for same-sex relationships.

Open and Affirming Coalition UCC brings together 1,743 churches and 8 seminaries in 2025 that support blessings of same-sex marriage.

=== Studies and surveys of beliefs ===
In 2001, the Hartford Institute for Religion Research conducted a "Faith Communities Today" (FACT) study that included a survey of United Church of Christ beliefs. Among the results of this were findings that in the UCC, 5.6% of the churches responding to the survey described their members as "very liberal or progressive", 3.4% as "very conservative", 22.4% as "somewhat liberal or progressive", and 23.6% as "somewhat conservative". Those results suggested a nearly equal balance between liberal and conservative congregations. However, the self-described "moderate" group was the largest at 45%. Other statistics found by the Hartford Institute show that 53.2% of members say "the Bible" is the highest source of authority, 16.1% say the "Holy Spirit", 9.2% say "Reason", 6.3% say "Experience", and 6.1% say "Creeds".

David Roozen, director of the Hartford Institute for Religion Research, who has studied the United Church of Christ, said surveys show the national church's pronouncements are often more liberal than the views in the pews but that its governing structure is set up to allow such disagreements. Starting in 2003, a task force commissioned by General Synod 24 studied the diverse worship habits of UCC churches. The study can be found online and reflects statistics on attitudes toward worship, baptism, and communion, such as "Laity (70%) and clergy (90%) alike overwhelmingly describe worship 'as an encounter with God that leads to doing God's work in the world.'" "95 percent of our congregations use the Revised Common Lectionary in some way in planning or actual worship and preaching" and "96 percent always or almost always have a sermon, 86 percent have a time with children, 95 percent have a time of sharing joys and concerns, and 98 percent include the Prayer of Our Savior/Lord's Prayer." Clergy and laity were invited to select two meanings of baptism that they emphasize. They were also to suggest the meaning that they thought their entire church emphasized. Baptism as an "entry into the Church Universal" was the most frequent response. Clergy and laity were invited to identify two meanings of Holy Communion that they emphasize. While clergy emphasized Holy Communion as "a meal in which we encounter God's living presence", laity emphasized "a remembrance of Jesus' last supper, death, and resurrection".

=== Relationships with other denominations ===
One of the UCC's central beliefs is that it is "called to be a united and uniting church". Because of this, the UCC is involved in Churches Uniting in Christ, an organization seeking to establish full communion among nine Protestant denominations in America. Currently, the UCC has entered into an ecumenical partnership with the Christian Church (Disciples of Christ) and through A Formula of Agreement, signed in 1997, is in full communion with the Evangelical Lutheran Church in America, Presbyterian Church (USA), and the Reformed Church in America. Internationally, the UCC has been in full communion with the Union Evangelischer Kirchen (Union of Evangelical Churches) in Germany since 1981. The UEK is an organization of 13 Reformed and United Landeskirchen (regional churches) within the federation of Protestant churches known as the Evangelical Church of Germany.

In 1982, the World Council of Churches (WCC) published "Baptism, Eucharist and Ministry", a document that has served as a foundation for many ecumenical recognition agreements. As a WCC member church, the United Church of Christ issued a response as part of the process to work toward a statement of common theological perspectives.

On October 17, 2015, representatives of the United Church of Christ and the United Church of Canada came together in Niagara Falls, Ontario, to sign a historic full communion agreement. This agreement was approved at the 30th General Synod of the UCC and the 42nd General Council of the United Church of Canada in the summer of 2015 and signifies the mutual desire of both denominations to work in cooperation and openness in the areas of worship, mission, witness, ministry and the proclamation of a common faith. This agreement will allow the two denominations to recognize the validity of each other's sacraments and ordination of ministers and opens up the possibility of ministers being called to serve in congregations of either denomination.

The UCC is a member of Christian Churches Together (CCT), an interdenominational fellowship in the United States aimed at strengthening ties between different branches of Christianity. Through the CCT, the United Church of Christ is in communication with the United States Conference of Catholic Bishops for cooperation towards shared issues, as well as involvement in theological dialogue.

=== Relationships with other religions ===
The United Church of Christ facilitates bilateral dialogues with many faith groups, including members of the Jewish and Muslim communities. This includes membership in the National Muslim-Christian Initiative.

== Structure ==
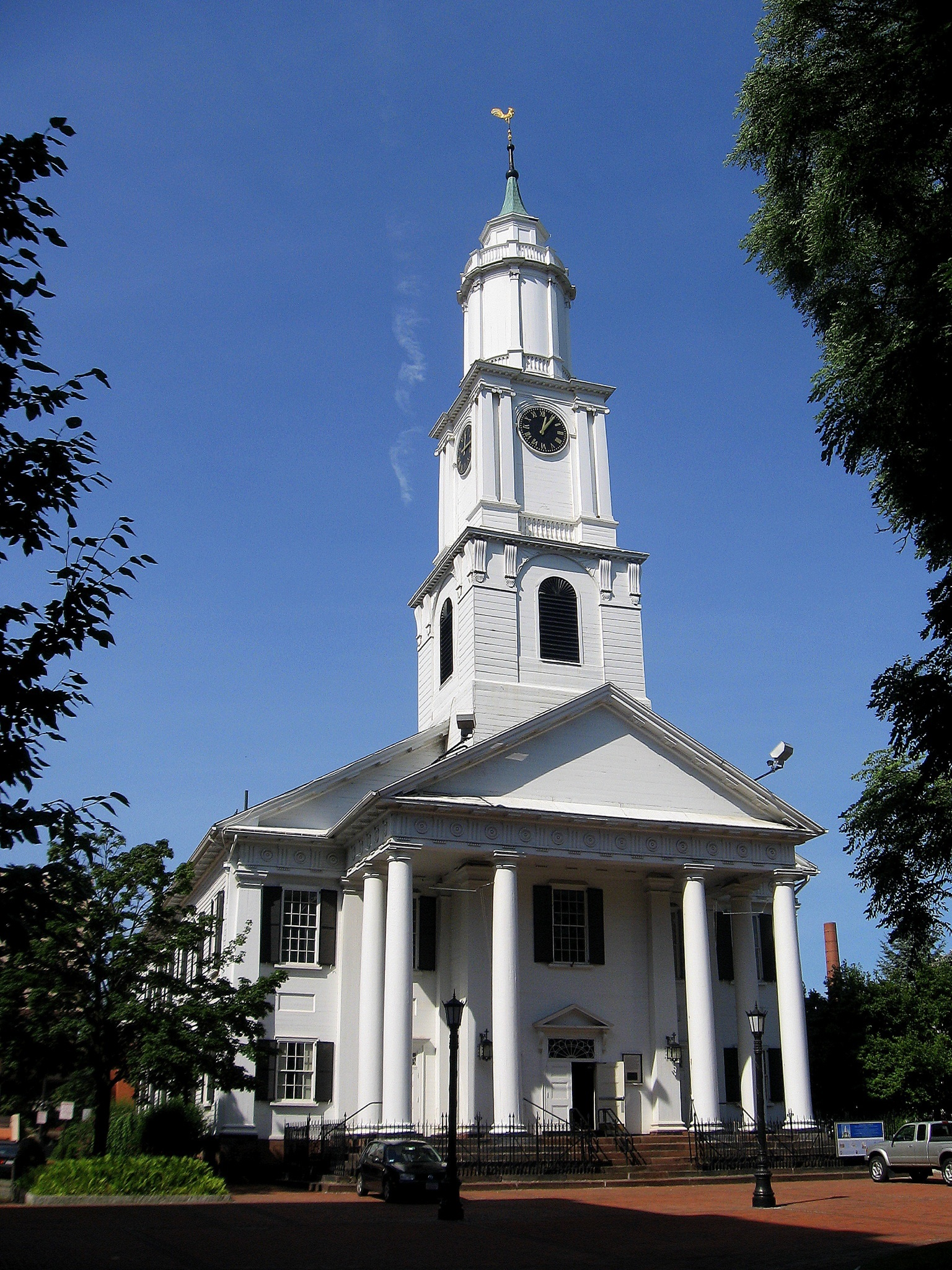
First Congregational Church in Springfield, Massachusetts

Quoting the United Church of Christ Constitution, "The basic unit of the life and organization of the United Church of Christ is the local church." An interplay of wider interdependence with local autonomy characterizes the organization of the UCC. Each "setting" of the United Church of Christ relates covenantally with other settings, their actions speaking "to but not for" each other.

The ethos of United Church of Christ organization is considered "covenantal". The structure of UCC organization is a mixture of the congregational and presbyterian polities of its predecessor denominations. With ultimate authority given to the local church, many see United Church of Christ polity as closer to congregationalism; however, with ordination and pastoral oversight of licensed, commissioned and ordained ministers conducted by Associations, and General Synod representation given to Conferences instead of congregational delegates, certain similarities to presbyterian polity are also visible.

The UCC's "Covenantal Polity" is best expressed in Article III of the 1999 revision of the Bylaws and Constitution of the United Church of Christ.

Within the United Church of Christ, the various expressions of the church relate to each other in a covenantal manner. Each expression of the church has responsibilities and rights in relation to the others, to the end that the whole church will seek God's will and be faithful to God's mission. Decisions are made in consultation and collaboration among the various parts of the structure. As members of the Body of Christ, each expression of the church is called to honor and respect the work and ministry of each other part. Each expression of the church listens, hears, and carefully considers the advice, counsel and requests of others. In this covenant, the various expressions of the United Church of Christ seek to walk together in all God's ways.

=== Local churches ===
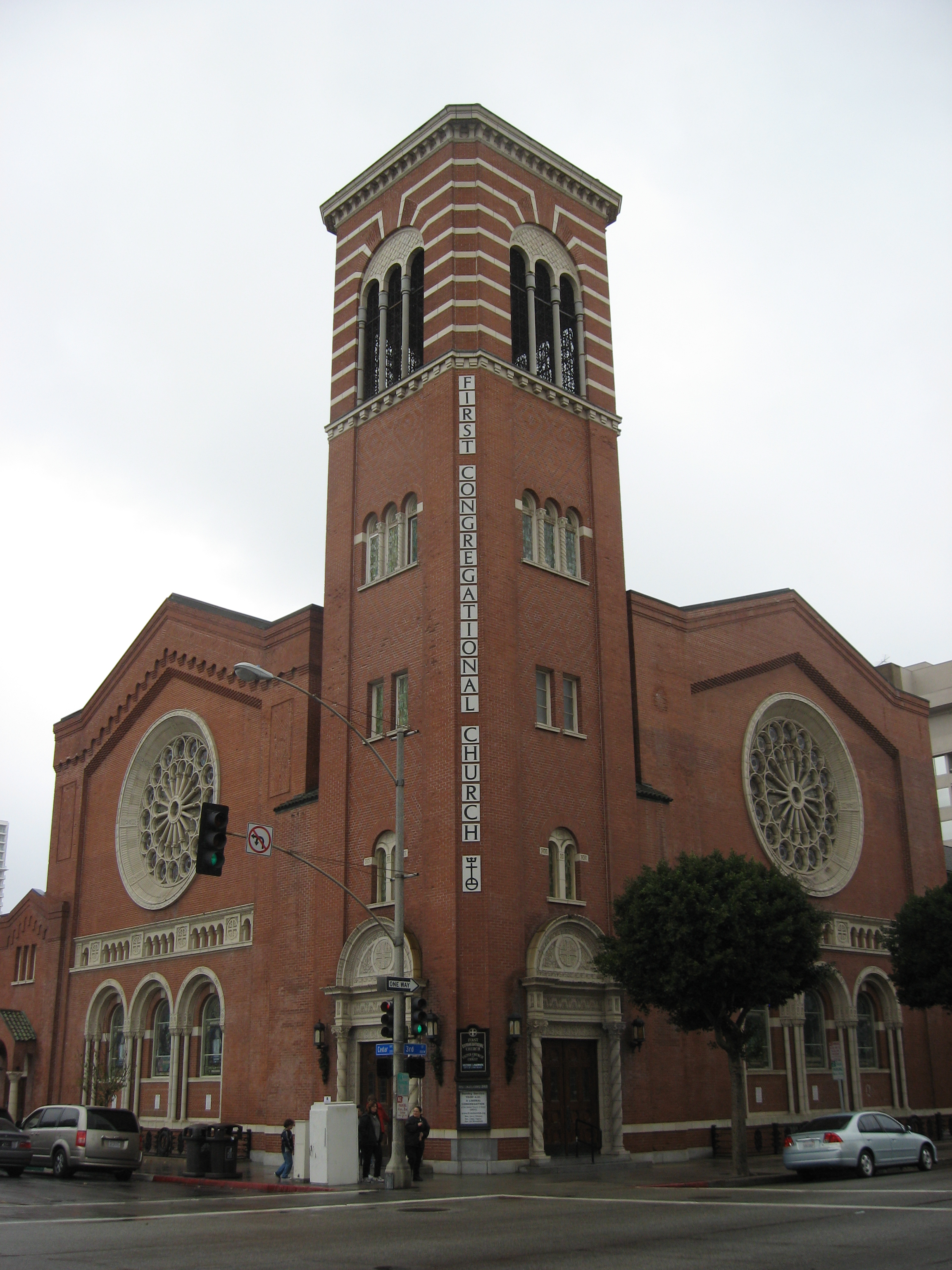
First Congregational Church of Long Beach, California

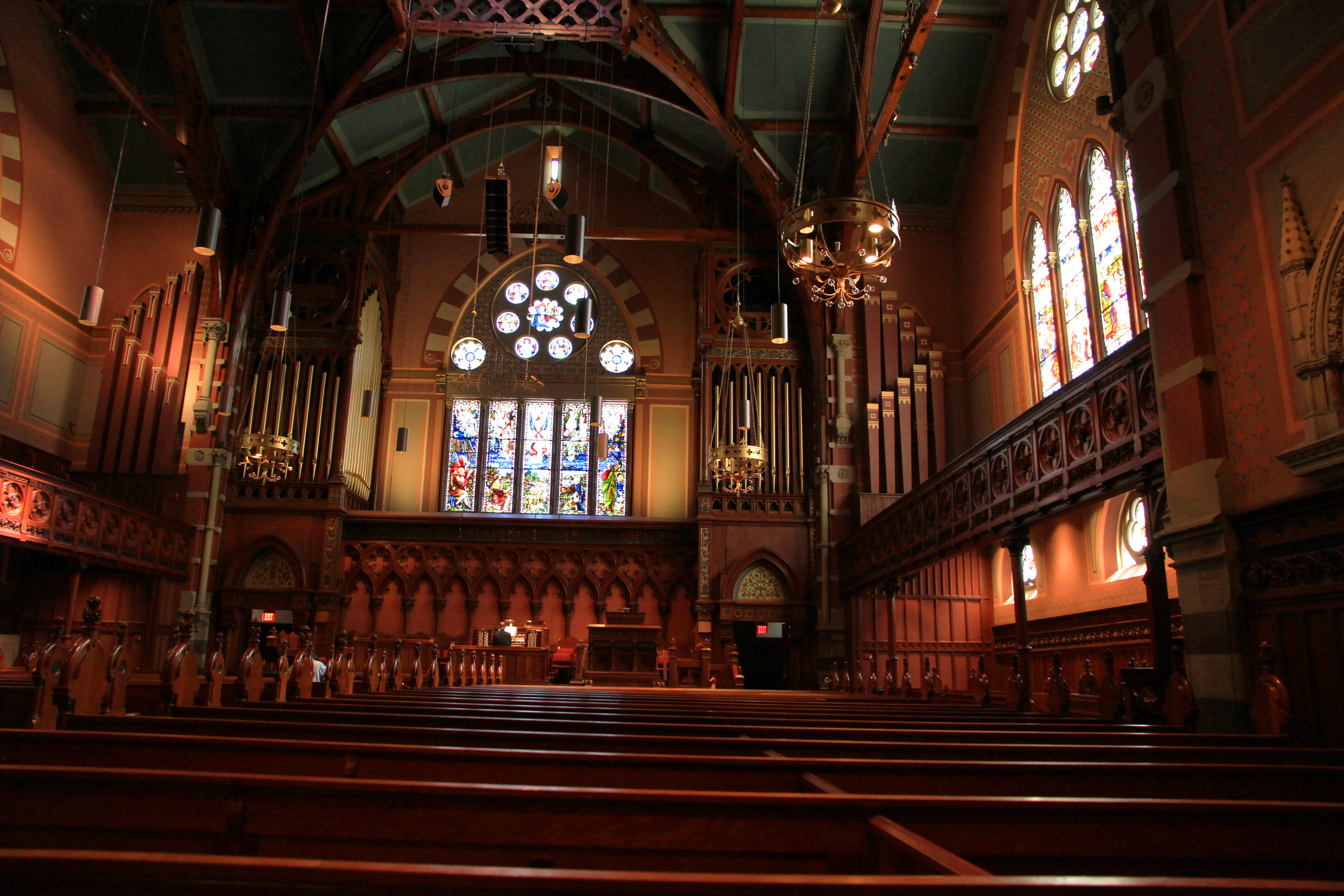
Old South Church, Boston

The basic unit of the United Church of Christ is the local church (also often called the congregation). Local churches have the freedom to govern themselves, establishing their own internal organizational structures and theological positions. Thus, local church governance varies widely throughout the denomination. Some congregations, mainly of Congregational or Christian Connection origin, have numerous relatively independent "boards" that oversee different aspects of church life, with annual or more frequent meetings (often conducted after a worship service on a Sunday afternoon) of the entire congregation to elect officers, approve budgets and set congregational policy. Other churches, mainly of Evangelical and Reformed descent, have one central "church council" or "consistory" that handles most or all affairs in a manner somewhat akin to a Presbyterian session, while still holding an annual congregational meeting for the purpose of electing officers and/or ratifying annual budgets. Still others, usually those congregations started after the 1957 merger, have structures incorporating aspects of both, or other alternative organizational structures entirely.

In almost all cases, though, the selection of a minister for the congregation is, in keeping with the Reformed tradition of the "priesthood of all believers", vested in a congregational meeting, held usually after a special ad hoc committee searches on the congregation's behalf for a candidate. Members of the congregation vote for or against the committee's recommended candidate for the pastorate, usually immediately after the candidate has preached a "trial sermon;" candidates are usually presented one at a time and not as a field of several to be selected from. Typically the candidate must secure anywhere from 60 to 90 percent affirmative votes from the membership before the congregation issues a formal call to the candidate; this depends on the provisions in the congregation's particular constitution and/or by-laws.

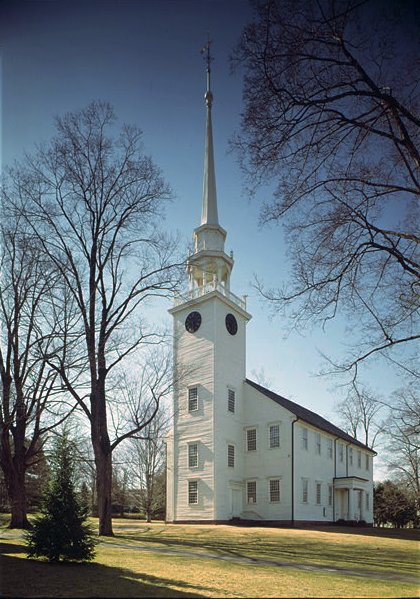
First Church of Christ, Congregational in Farmington, Connecticut

Local churches have, in addition to the freedom to hire ministers and lay staff, the sole power to dismiss them also. However, unlike purely congregational polities, the association has the main authority to ordain clergy and grant membership, or "standing", to clergy coming to a church from another association or another denomination (this authority is exercised "in cooperation with" the person being ordained/called and the local church that is calling them). Such standing, among other things, permits a minister to participate in the UCC clergy pension and insurance plans. Local churches are usually aided in searching for and calling ordained clergy through a denominationally coordinated "search-and-call" system, usually facilitated by staff at the conference level. However, the local church may, for various reasons, opt not to avail itself of the conference placement system, and is free to do so without fear of retaliation, which would likely occur in synodical or presbyterian polities. However, many UCC congregations have constitutions that mandate that their called pastor be an ordained minister approved by the association, while others require that the call of a pastor be approved by the association committee on ministry. Participation in the search and call process is usually considered a sign of the congregation's loyalty to the larger denomination and its work.

At the end of 2008, 5,320 churches were reported to be within the UCC, averaging 210 members. Sixteen churches were reported to have over 2,000 members, but 64% had fewer than 200 members. The latter statistic probably indicates where most of the denomination's declining membership has occurred, in formerly mid-sized congregations between 200 and 500 members or so. The reduction in a typical church's size has also meant that, increasingly, many congregations are no longer able, as they once were, to afford a full-time, seminary-educated pastor, and that some of them have to rely on alternatives such as one of their members serving the church under a license, the use of recently retired clergy on a short-term basis, or ordained ministers serving the church on a half-time (or less) basis while earning their primary income from chaplaincies or other occupations. While this has been occurring to a lesser degree in other mainline denominations as well, the UCC's congregational polity allows for churches to adopt such approaches without ecclesiological restraint, as might happen in a more hierarchical denominational structure.

=== Larger organizations ===
==== Associations ====
Local churches are typically gathered together in regional bodies called Associations. Local churches often give financial support to the association to support its activities. The official delegates of an association are all ordained clergy within the bounds of the association together with lay delegates sent from each local church. The association's main ecclesiastical function is to provide primary oversight and authorization of ordained and other authorized ministers; it also is the ecclesiastical link between the local congregation and the larger UCC. The association ordains new ministers, holds ministers' standing in covenant with local churches, and is responsible for disciplinary action; typically a specific ministerial committee handles these duties. Also, an association, again with the assistance of the ministerial committee, admits and removes local congregations from membership in the UCC.

Associations meet at least once annually to elect officers and board members and set budgets for the association's work; fellowship and informational workshops are often conducted during those meetings, which may take place more frequently according to local custom. In a few instances where there is only one association within a conference, or where the associations within a conference have agreed to dissolve, the Conference (below) assumes the association's functions.

==== Conferences ====
See also: Ohio Conference, Michigan Conference

Local churches also are members of larger Conferences, of which there are 36 in the United Church of Christ. Some cover an individual state, for example the Michigan Conference. Some states have more than one conference—for example Pennsylvania has four. Some cover more than one state—for example the South West Conference covers Arizona and New Mexico. A conference typically contains multiple associations; if no associations exist within its boundaries, the conference exercises the functions of the association as well. Conferences are supported financially through local churches' contribution to "Our Church's Wider Mission" (formerly "Our Christian World Mission"), the United Church of Christ's denominational support system; unlike most associations, they usually have permanent headquarters and professional staff. The primary ecclesiastical function of a conference is to provide the primary support for the search-and-call process by which churches select ordained leadership; the conference minister and/or his or her associates perform this task in coordination with the congregation's pulpit search committee (see above) and the association to which the congregation belongs (particularly its ministerial committee). Conferences also provide significant programming resources for their constituent churches, such as Christian education resources and support, interpretation of the larger UCC's mission work, and church extension within their bounds (the latter usually conducted in conjunction with the national Local Church Ministries division).

Conferences, like associations, are congregationally representative bodies, with each local church sending ordained and lay delegates. Most current UCC conferences were formed in the several years following the consummation of the national merger in 1961, and in some instances were the unions of former Congregational Christian conferences (led by superintendents) and Evangelical and Reformed synods (led by presidents, some of whom served on only a part-time basis). A few have had territorial adjustments since then; only one conference, the Calvin Synod, composed of Hungarian-heritage Reformed congregations, received exemption from the geographical alignments, with its churches scattered from Connecticut westward to California and southward to Florida. Only one conference has ever withdrawn completely from the denomination: Puerto Rico, expressing disapproval of national UCC tolerance of homosexuality (as well as that of a large number of mainland congregations), departed the denomination in 2006, taking all of its churches.

==== General Synod ====
The denomination's church-wide deliberative body is the General Synod, which meets every three years. The General Synod consists of delegates elected from the Conferences (distributed proportionally by conference size) together with the members of the United Church of Christ Board (see below), the officers of the denomination, and representatives of so-called "Historically Underrepresented Groups", such as the disabled, young adults, racial minorities, and gay and lesbian persons.

While General Synod provides the most visible voice of the "stance of the denomination" on any particular issue, the covenantal polity of the denomination means that General Synod speaks to local churches, associations, and conferences, but not for them. Thus, the other settings of the church are allowed to hold differing views and practices on all non-constitutional matters.

General Synod considers three kinds of resolutions:

- Pronouncements: A Pronouncement is a statement of Christian conviction on a matter of moral or social principle and has been adopted by a two-thirds vote of a General Synod.
- Proposals for Action: A Proposal for Action is a recommendation for specific directional statements and goals implementing a Pronouncement. A Proposal for Action normally accompanies a Pronouncement. (See link above regarding Pronouncements.)
- Resolutions and Other Formal Motions, which may consist of the following three types:
  - Resolutions of Witness: A Resolution of Witness is an expression of the General Synod concerning a moral, ethical, or religious matter confronting the church, the nation, or the world, adopted for the guidance of the officers, Associated, or Affiliated Ministries, or other bodies as defined in Article VI of the Bylaws of the United Church of Christ; the consideration of local churches, Associations, Conferences, and other bodies related to the United Church of Christ; and for a Christian witness to the world. It represents agreement by at least two-thirds of the delegates voting that the view expressed is based on Christian conviction and is a part of their witness to Jesus Christ.
  - Prudential Resolutions: A Prudential Resolution establishes policy, institutes or revises structure or procedures, authorizes programs, approves directions, or requests actions by a majority vote..
  - Other Formal Motions

==== National offices: covenanted, affiliated, and associated ministries ====
As agents of the General Synod, the denomination maintains national offices comprising four "covenanted ministries", one "associated ministry", and one "affiliated ministry". The current system of national governance was adopted in 1999 as a restructure of the national setting, consolidating numerous agencies, boards, and "instrumentalities" that the UCC, in the main, had inherited from the Congregational Christian Churches at the time of merger, along with several created during the denomination's earlier years.

===== Covenanted ministries =====
These structures carry out the work of the General Synod and support the local churches, associations, and conferences. The head executives of these ministries comprise the five member Collegium of Officers, which are the non-hierarchical official officers of the denomination. (The Office of General Ministries is represented by both the General Minister, who serves as President of the denomination, and the Associate General minister). According to the UCC office of communication press release at the time of restructure, "In the new executive arrangement, the five will work together in a Collegium of Officers, meeting as peers. This setting is designed to provide an opportunity for mutual responsibility and reporting, as well as ongoing assessment of UCC programs." The main offices of the Covenanted ministries are at the "Church House", the United Church of Christ national headquarters at 700 Prospect Avenue in Cleveland, Ohio.

- The Office of General Ministries (OGM) is responsible for administration, common services (technology, physical plant, etc.), covenantal relations (ecumenical relations, formal relations to other settings of the church), financial development, and "proclamation, identity and communication". On July 3, 2023, the General Synod of the United Church of Christ elected Rev. Karen Georgia Thompson as the first woman, and the first African-American woman, to lead the denomination as General Minister and President.
- Local Church Ministries (LCM) is responsible for evangelism, stewardship and church finance, worship and education, Pilgrim Press and United Church Resources (the publishing house of the United Church of Christ), and parish life and leadership (authorization, clergy development, seminary relations, parish leadership, etc.). The position of Executive Minister of Local Church Ministries is vacant.
- Wider Church Ministries (WCM) is responsible for partner relations* (relations with churches around the world, missionary work, etc.), local church relations* (as relates to world ministries and missions), global sharing of resources, health and wholeness ministry, and global education and advocacy*. The starred '*' ministries are carried out through the Common Global Ministries Board, a joint instrumentality of the United Church of Christ and the Christian Church (Disciples of Christ), based in Indianapolis, Indiana. WCM is sometimes referred to as the United Church Board for World Ministries, the historic successor to the Congregationalist American Board of Commissioners for Foreign Missions and the E&R affiliated Board of International Missions The current Executive Minister for Wider Church Ministries is the Rev. Rev. Jim Moos.
- Justice and Witness Ministries (JWM) is responsible for ministries related to economic justice, human rights, justice for women and transformation, public life and social policy, and racial justice. In addition to its offices in Cleveland, JWM also maintains an office on Capitol Hill in Washington, D.C. The current Executive Minister for Justice and Witness Ministries is Rev. Traci D. Blackmon. JWM also maintains an office called "Minister for Children, Families and Human Sexuality Advocacy" that promotes the Our Whole Lives sex education curriculum.

===== Affiliated ministry =====
The Pension Boards of the United Church of Christ (PB-UCC) operates the employee benefits systems for all settings of the United Church of Christ, including health, dental, and optical insurance, retirement annuity/pension systems, disability and life insurance, and ministerial assistance programs. The Pension Boards offices are located in New York City, where the headquarters of all UCC national bodies had been located prior to their move to Ohio in the early 1990s.

The Insurance Board is a nonprofit corporation for whom the sole member is the collective body of Conferences of the United Church of Christ. It is run by a President/CEO and a 21-member Board, with the full corporate board consisting of Conference, Region, and Presbytery leaders as well as laypeople. The IB administers a property insurance, liability insurance, and risk management program serving the United Church of Christ, the Presbyterian Church(USA), and the Christian Church (Disciples of Christ) churches and other churches of ecumenically affiliated denominational partners.

===== Associated ministry =====
United Church Funds (UCF), formerly known as The United Church Foundation, provides low cost, socially responsible, professionally managed Common Investment Funds (CIFs) and other trustee services to any setting of the United Church of Christ. United Church Funds' offices are also located in New York City.

== Activities ==
=== Civil Rights Movement ===
Everett Parker of the UCC Office of Communication, at the request of Martin Luther King Jr., organized UCC churches in 1959 against television stations in the Southern United States that were imposing news blackouts of information about the then growing Civil Rights Movement. The UCC later won a lawsuit that resulted in a federal court decision that the broadcast airwaves are public, not private, property. That led toward the proliferation of people of color in television studios and newsrooms.

=== Social activism ===
The UCC national body has been active in numerous traditionally liberal social causes, including support for abortion rights, the United Farm Workers, and the Wilmington Ten.

==== Apology Resolution ====
The United Church of Christ was recognized in the Apology Resolution to Native Hawaiians. Congress recognized the reconciliation made by the UCC in the Eighteenth General Synod for their actions in overthrowing the Kingdom of Hawaii.

==== Statement on the relationship between Israel and Palestinians ====
United Church of Christ General Synod 25 passed two resolutions concerning the conflict between Israel and Palestinians in the Middle East. One called for using economic leverage to promote peace in the Middle East, including measures such as government lobbying, selective investment, shareholder lobbying, and selective divestment from companies that profit from the continuing Israeli–Palestinian conflict. The other resolution, named "Tear Down the Wall", called upon Israel to remove the separation barrier between Israel and the West Bank. Opponents of the "Tear Down the Wall" resolution noted that the wall's purpose is to prevent terrorist attacks and that the resolution does not call for a stop to these attacks. The Simon Wiesenthal Center stated that the July 2005 UCC resolutions on divestment from Israel were "functionally anti-Semitic". The Anti-Defamation League stated that those same resolutions were "disappointing and disturbing" and "deeply troubling". In addition to the concerns raised about the merits of the "economic leverage" resolution, additional concerns were raised about the process in which the General Synod approved the resolution. Michael Downs of the United Church of Christ Pension Boards (who would be charged with implementing any divestment of the UCC's Pension Board investments) wrote a letter to UCC President John H. Thomas expressing concern "with the precedent-setting implications of voted actions, integrity of process and trust".

=== Sexuality education ===
The United Church of Christ, along with the Unitarian Universalist Association (UUA), created the Our Whole Lives curriculum (commonly known as OWL), which is a lifespan, comprehensive, inclusive, and developmentally appropriate sexuality education program. The Whole Lives includes modules for grades K–1, 4–6, 7–9, 10–12, and for Young Adults and Adults. The Our Whole Lives curricula are secular. Congregations who use this program often also use "Sexuality and Our Faith" for the age level they are offering. Sexuality and Our Faith are separate manuals that bring in the UUA principles and scripture used in the UCC to support its teachings. The curriculum is based on guidelines from the Sexuality Information and Education Council of the United States.

==== Polyamory ====
In 2021, the UCC and the UUA presented "a study on polyamory by the Canadian Unitarian Council" as a part of its sexual education programs. Prior to the sexuality education series, in 2016, the UCC published differing opinions on polyamory in the UCC Stillspeaking Daily Devotional, one in opposition and one in favor of affirming polyamory.

=== "God Is Still Speaking" identity campaign ===
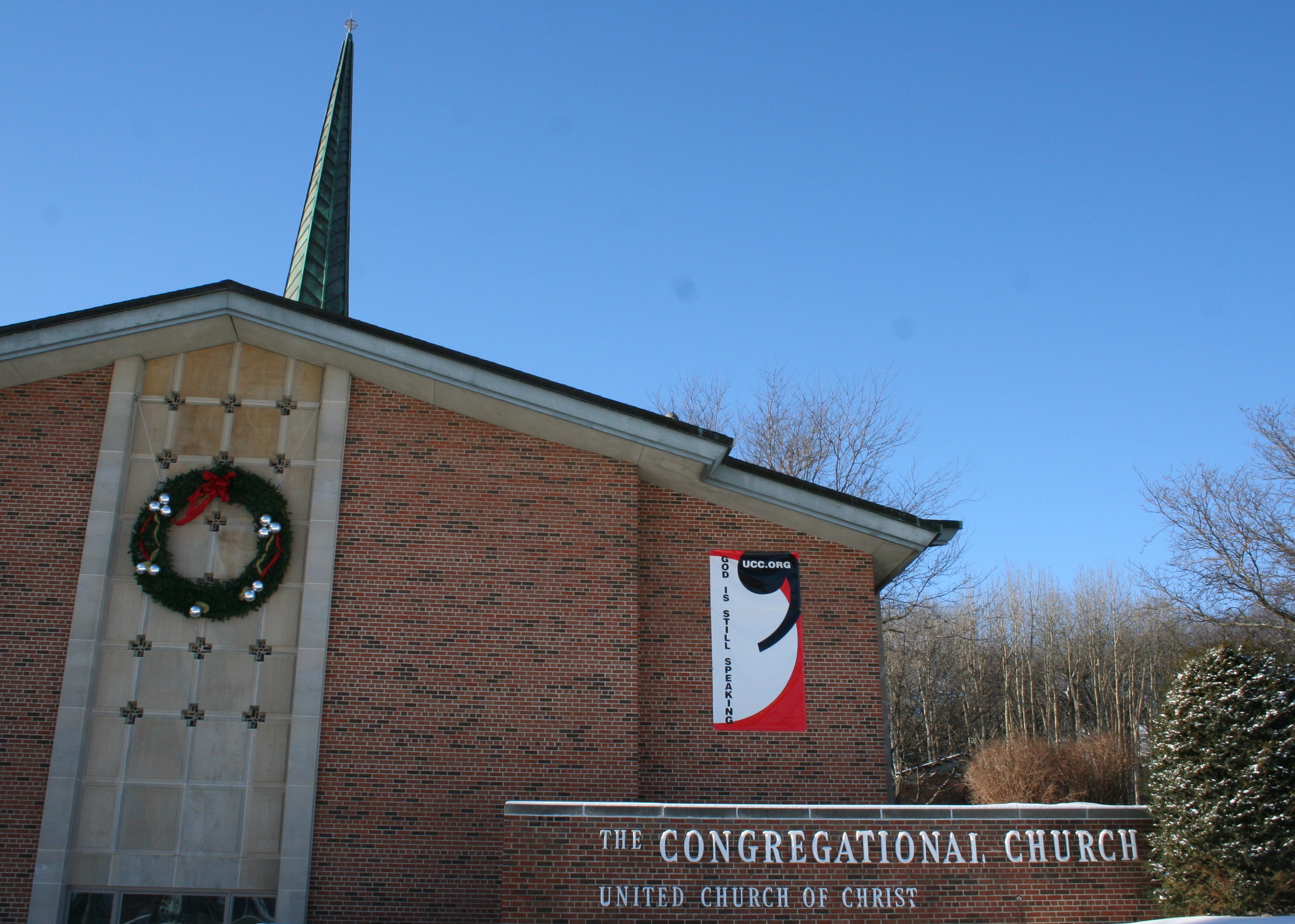
"God Is Still Speaking" banner on a UCC church in Rochester, Minnesota

At the 2003 General Synod, the United Church of Christ began a campaign with "emphasis on expanding the UCC's name-brand identity through modern advertising and marketing". Formally launched during the advent season in 2004, the campaign included a coordinated program of evangelism and hospitality training for congregations paired with national and local television "brand" advertising, known as the "God is Still Speaking" campaign or "The Stillspeaking Initiative". The initiative was themed around the quotation "Never place a period where God has placed a comma" attributed to Gracie Allen. Campaign materials, including print and broadcast advertising and merchandise, featured the quote and a large comma with a visual theme in red and black. United Church of Christ congregations were asked to opt into the campaign, signifying their support and willingness to receive training on hospitality and evangelism. An evangelism event was held in Atlanta in August 2005 to promote the campaign. Several renewal groups panned the ad campaign for its efforts to create an ONA/progressive perception of the UCC identity despite its actual majority in centrist/moderate viewpoints. According to John Evans, associate professor of sociology at University of California, San Diego, "The UCC is clearly going after a certain niche in American society who are very progressive and have a particular religious vision that includes inclusiveness...They are becoming the religious brand that is known for this."

== Criticism ==
The church's diversity and adherence to covenantal polity (rather than government by regional elders or bishops) give individual congregations a great deal of freedom in the areas of worship, congregational life, and doctrine. Nonetheless, some critics, mainly social and theological conservatives, are vocal about the UCC's theology, political identity, and cultural milieu.

=== Criticism over same-sex marriage ===
Following the decision of General Synod 25 in 2005 to endorse same-sex marriage, the UCC's Puerto Rico Conference left the church, citing differences over "the membership and ministry of gay, lesbian, bisexual, and transgender Christians" as did a number of conservative congregations.

== Barack Obama and the UCC ==
In 2007, a controversy arose over then U.S. presidential candidate Barack Obama speaking at UCC gatherings, but the Internal Revenue Service (IRS) found that the UCC had adhered to the prohibition against churches campaigning for political candidates.

In 2007, longtime UCC member Barack Obama (then a Democratic presidential candidate) spoke at the UCC's Iowa Conference meeting and at the General Synod 26. A complaint filed with the IRS alleged that the UCC promoted Obama's candidacy by having him speak at those meetings.

Barry Lynn, an ordained UCC minister and the executive director of Americans United for Separation of Church and State, stated that although he personally would not have invited a presidential candidate to speak at the meetings, he believed "the Internal Revenue Service permits this to happen." The church had consulted lawyers prior to the event to make sure they were following the law and had instructed those in attendance that no Obama campaign material would be allowed in the meeting. Nevertheless, in February 2008, the IRS sent a letter to the church stating that it was launching an inquiry into the matter.

On February 27, 2008, in an open letter to UCC members, Rev. John H. Thomas announced the creation of The UCC Legal Fund, to aid in the denomination's defense against the IRS. While the denomination expected legal expenses to surpass six figures, it halted donations after raising $59,564 in less than a week.

In May 2008, the IRS issued a letter that stated that the UCC had taken appropriate steps and that the denomination's tax status was not in jeopardy.

== Membership ==
At the time of its formation, the UCC had over 2 million members in nearly 7,000 churches. The denomination has suffered a 44 percent loss in membership since the mid-1960s. By 1980, membership was at about 1.7 million and by the turn of the century had dropped to 1.3 million. In 2006, the UCC had roughly 1.2 million members in 5,452 churches. According to its 2008 annual report, the United Church of Christ had about 1.1 million members in about 5,300 local congregations. However the 2010 annual report showed a decline of 31,000 members and a loss of 33 congregations since then. The decline in number of congregations continued through 2011, as the 2011 Annual Report shows 5,100 member churches. As of the 2014 Annual Yearbook of the UCC, membership is listed as 979,239 members in 5,154 local churches. According to the 2023 report for 2022 statistics, the membership had declined to 712,296 members in 4,603 congregations. In the prior decade, from 2012 to 2022, the denomination had dropped from about 998,906 to 712,296 members, an almost 29% decline in a decade.

Membership is concentrated primarily in the Northeast and Midwest. Pennsylvania, a bastion of the German Reformed tradition, has the largest number of members and churches. As of 2000, the state had over 700 congregations and over 200,000 members. The highest membership rates are in the states of Connecticut, Vermont, New Hampshire, and Maine, situated in the heartland of the American Congregationalist movement.

The United Church of Christ among Christian churches has a highly educated membership, with 46% of members holding college or post-graduate degrees. Only Presbyterians (47%), Episcopalians (56%), and Anglicans (60%) ranked higher. The church also claims a disproportionate share of high-income earners.

== United Church of Christ institutions ==
=== Officially related educational institutions ===
==== Seminaries ====
- Andover Newton Seminary at Yale Divinity School (New Haven, Connecticut)
- Chicago Theological Seminary (Chicago, Illinois)
- Eden Theological Seminary (Webster Groves and St. Louis, Missouri)
- Lancaster Theological Seminary (Lancaster, Pennsylvania)
- Pacific School of Religion (Berkeley, California)
- United Theological Seminary of the Twin Cities (Saint Paul, Minnesota)

==== Colleges and universities ====
These 19 schools have affirmed the purposes of the United Church of Christ Council for Higher Education by official action and are full members of the Council.

- Catawba College (Salisbury, North Carolina)
- Chapman University (Orange, California)
- Defiance College (Defiance, Ohio)
- Dillard University (New Orleans, Louisiana)
- Doane University (Crete, Nebraska)
- Drury University (Springfield, Missouri)
- Elmhurst University (Elmhurst, Illinois)
- Heidelberg University (Ohio) (Tiffin, Ohio)
- Huston–Tillotson University (Austin, Texas)
- Illinois College (Jacksonville, Illinois)
- Lakeland University (Sheboygan, Wisconsin)
- LeMoyne-Owen College (Memphis, Tennessee)
- Olivet College (Olivet, Michigan)
- Pacific University (Forest Grove, Oregon)
- Piedmont University (Demorest, Georgia)
- Rocky Mountain College (Billings, Montana)
- Talladega College (Talladega, Alabama)
- Tougaloo College (Tougaloo, Mississippi)

==== Secondary academies ====
- The Massanutten Academy (Woodstock, Virginia)
- The Mercersburg Academy (Mercersburg, Pennsylvania)

=== Historically related educational institutions ===
==== Historically related seminaries ====
- Hartford Seminary (Hartford, Connecticut)
- Harvard Divinity School (Cambridge, Massachusetts)
- Howard University School of Divinity (Washington, D.C.)
- Interdenominational Theological Center (Atlanta, Georgia)
- Seminario Evangélico de Puerto Rico (San Juan, Puerto Rico)
- Union Theological Seminary (New York, New York)
- Vanderbilt University Divinity School (Nashville, Tennessee)
- Yale Divinity School (New Haven, Connecticut)

==== Historically related colleges and universities (Council for Higher Education) ====
"These colleges continue to relate to the United Church of Christ through the Council for Higher Education, but chose not to affirm the purposes of the Council. Though in many respects similar to the colleges and universities that have full membership in the Council, these institutions tend to be less intentional about their relationships with the United Church of Christ." (from the United Church of Christ website)

- Beloit College (Beloit, Wisconsin)
- Carleton College (Northfield, Minnesota)
- Cedar Crest College (Allentown, Pennsylvania)
- Fisk University (Nashville, Tennessee)
- Franklin and Marshall College (Lancaster, Pennsylvania)
- Grinnell College (Grinnell, Iowa)
- Hood College (Frederick, Maryland)
- Ripon College (Ripon, Wisconsin)
- Ursinus College (Collegeville, Pennsylvania)
- Westminster College of Salt Lake City (Salt Lake City, Utah)

==== Other colleges and universities (historically related, now unrelated) ====
These colleges and universities were founded by or are otherwise related historically to the denomination or its predecessors, but no longer maintain any direct relationship.

- Brokenshire College (Davao City, Philippines)
- Chamberlain College of Nursing, formerly Deaconess College of Nursing (St. Louis, Missouri)
- Colorado College (Colorado Springs, Colorado)
- Dartmouth College (Hanover, New Hampshire)
- Elon University (Elon, North Carolina)
- Harvard University (Cambridge, Massachusetts) – was founded by Congregationalists, but became informally Unitarian by 1807.
- New College Florida (Sarasota, Florida)
- Oberlin College (Oberlin, Ohio)
- Pomona College (Claremont, California)
- Rollins College (Winter Park, Florida)
- Tohoku Gakuin University (Sendai, Japan)
- University of California, Berkeley (Berkeley, California)
- Whitman College (Walla Walla, Washington) – briefly associated with the Congregational Church in the early 1900s
- Yale University (New Haven, Connecticut) – was founded by Congregational ministers in 1701. Its chapel was officially affiliated with the UCC 1961 to 2005.

== List of prominent UCC churches ==
- Cathedral of Hope (Dallas) – the largest church in the United States with a primary outreach to lesbian, gay, bisexual and transgender people. Local membership exceeds 4,000 people, though the church claims over 52,000 worldwide constituents.
- Lynnhaven Colony Congregational Church – Largest UCC church in the Hampton Roads area of Southeastern Virginia.
- Central Union Church of Honolulu – The largest UCC church in the state of Hawai'i. Notable past member includes missionary and educator, Philip Delaporte, who proselytized in Nauru.
- Old South Church in Boston is one of the oldest congregations in the United States. It was organized in 1669 by dissenters from the First Church in Boston (1630). Notable past members include Samuel Adams, William Dawes, Benjamin Franklin, Samuel Sewall, and Phillis Wheatley. In 1773, Samuel Adams gave the signal from the pulpit of the Old South Meeting House that started the Boston Tea Party. During the Unitarianism controversy of the early 19th century, Old South was the sole Congregational Church in Boston that remained Trinitarian.
- Plymouth Church, Des Moines, Iowa – is a historic congregation founded in 1857, located in Des Moines, Iowa. Plymouth is known for its long history of social justice work including anti-racism, climate care, and suffrage advocacy.
- Plymouth Church Seattle – is a historic congregation located in downtown Seattle. Plymouth is known for its history of advocacy for social justice, its music program and its creation of programs to serve the homeless, such as Plymouth Healing Communities and Plymouth Housing Group.
- Riverside Church – an interdenominational American Baptist and UCC church in New York City, famous for its elaborate Neo-Gothic architecture and its history of social justice. It was built between 1927 and 1930 with support from John D. Rockefeller. Harry Emerson Fosdick was its first minister. Other famous former ministers include William Sloane Coffin and James A. Forbes.
- Trinity United Church of Christ – a predominantly black church located in south Chicago. With upwards of 10,000 members, it is the largest church affiliated with the UCC. It was pastored by Rev. Jeremiah Wright until early 2008. It is now pastored by The Rev. Otis Moss III.
- Zion United Church of Christ – formerly known as the High German Evangelical Reformed Church and founded in 1762 in Allentown, Pennsylvania, Zion UCC is sometimes known as the Liberty Bell Church. In 1777, eleven bells were brought there from Philadelphia for safe‑keeping during the Revolutionary War. Those bells included the State House Bell, now better known as the Liberty Bell.
- First Church of Christ in Hartford – Historic church in Hartford, Connecticut whose members founded the city of Hartford and whose first pastor, Thomas Hooker is considered The Father of the State of Connecticut and is remembered for his sermon in 1638 wherein he declared that "The foundation of authority is laid firstly in the free consent of people", inspiring the towns that would afterwards form the Colony and later State to adopt The Fundamental Orders of Connecticut, a landmark document that is regarded as contributing to the United States Constitution.

== List of notable UCC members ==
This section lists notable people known to have been past or present members or raised in the United Church of Christ or its predecessor denominations.

=== Politicians ===
- Daniel Akaka – former U.S. senator from Hawaii (Democrat)
- Max Baucus – former U.S. senator from Montana (Democrat)
- Jon Corzine – former governor of New Jersey (Democrat)
- Howard Dean – former chairman of the Democratic National Committee, former governor of Vermont
- Jim Douglas – former governor of Vermont (Republican)
- Millard Fuller – founder of Habitat for Humanity and the Fuller Center for Housing grew up in the Lanett, AL Congregational Christian Church (UCC)
- Mills Godwin – former governor of Virginia (Democrat, later Republican)
- Bob Graham – former governor and U.S. senator from Florida (Democrat)
- Maggie Hassan – U.S. senator and former governor from New Hampshire (Democrat)
- Judd Gregg – former U.S. senator from New Hampshire (Republican)
- Hubert Humphrey – former vice president of the United States (Democrat)
- Jim Jeffords – former U.S. senator from Vermont (Republican, later Independent)
- Beth Kennett – first woman mayor of Burlington, North Carolina (Democrat)
- Bob Kerrey – former governor and U.S. senator from Nebraska (Democrat)
- Mark Kirk – former U.S. senator from Illinois (Republican)
- Amy Klobuchar – U.S. senator from Minnesota (Democrat)
- Barack Obama – 44th president of the United States of America (2009–2017) (Democrat)
- Robert Orr – former Assistant Secretary General of the United Nations
- Sally Pederson – former lieutenant governor of Iowa (Democrat)
- William Proxmire – former U.S. senator from Wisconsin (Democrat)
- Kwame Raoul – attorney general of Illinois (Democrat)
- Washington Gladden – early leader in the Social Gospel and Progressive movements
- George Smathers – former U.S. senator from Florida (Democrat)

=== Others ===
- Donald Bloesch – evangelical theologian
- Julian Bond – chair NAACP (2004–2008)
- Walter Brueggemann – contemporary theologian, poet, and UCC minister, retired professor at Columbia Theological Seminary
- William Sloane Coffin – late Presbyterian/UCC minister and activist; 'pastor, prophet, poet'; former chaplain at Yale University and Senior Pastor of Riverside Church, New York City
- W. Sterling Cary – president of the National Council of Churches from 1972 to 1975
- Common – rapper, recording artist, member of Trinity United Church of Christ in Chicago
- Donald Hall – U.S. Poet Laureate
- Roger Johnson – CEO of Western Digital and head of the General Services Administration under President Bill Clinton
- Dean Koontz – American writer and author; raised UCC, now is Catholic
- Barry W. Lynn – UCC minister and executive director of Americans United for Separation of Church and State
- William "Bill" McKinney – former president of Pacific School of Religion
- Sherrill Milnes – operatic baritone
- Robin Meyers – author, peace activist, and philosophy professor who served as Senior Minister of Mayflower Congregational United Church of Christ in Oklahoma City, Oklahoma from 1985 to 2020
- Bill Moyers – journalist and host of PBS current-affairs program Bill Moyers' Journal
- John Williamson Nevin – 19th-century theologian
- H. Richard Niebuhr – 20th-century theologian
- Reinhold Niebuhr – 20th-century theologian
- Leonard Pitts – nationally syndicated Pulitzer Prize–winning (2004) columnist
- Jackie Robinson – Major League Baseball player for the Brooklyn Dodgers, and the first African-American to break baseball's color barrier
- Marilynne Robinson – Pulitzer Prize–winning (2005) author of the novel Gilead
- Alex Ross – comic book writer and artist; son of UCC minister Clark Norman Ross.
- Philip Schaff – 19th-century theologian
- Max L. Stackhouse – public theologian and professor at Princeton Theological Seminary
- Jeri Kehn Thompson – American radio talk show host, columnist for The American Spectator, and political commentator
- Paul Tillich – 20th-century theologian
- Meredith Willson – composer of The Music Man, raised in First Congregational of Mason City, Iowa; long-time member of Westwood Hills Congregational, Los Angeles
- Andrew Young – civil-rights leader, ordained UCC pastor, and former member of Congress, UN ambassador, and mayor of Atlanta, Georgia

== See also ==
- Congregational Library
- Protestantism in the United States
