= Congregational Christian Churches =

U.S. Protestant Christian denomination

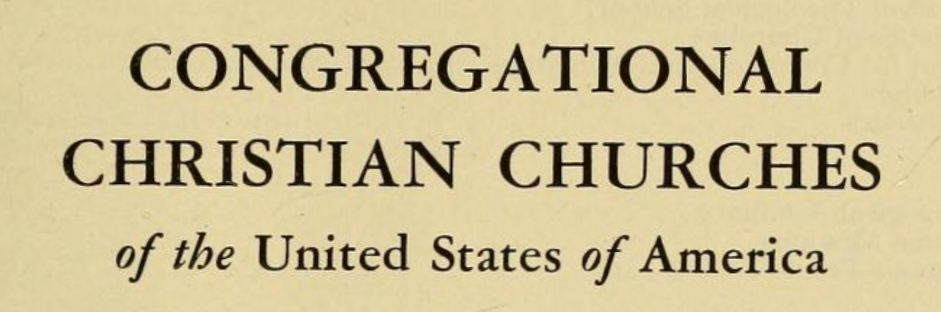
- Abbreviation: CCC
- Orientation: Mainline Protestant
- Theology: Reformed and Restorationist
- Polity: Congregational
- Origin: 1931; Seattle, Washington
- Merger of: National Council of the Congregational Churches of the United States; Christian Connection
- Separations: Conservative Congregational Christian Conference; National Association of Congregational Christian Churches
- Merged into: United Church of Christ
- Defunct: 1957
- Other names: Congregational and Christian Churches; General Council of Congregational Christian Churches

The Congregational Christian Churches was a Protestant Christian denomination that operated in the U.S. from 1931 through 1957. On the latter date, most of its churches joined the Evangelical and Reformed Church in a merger to become the United Church of Christ. Others created the National Association of Congregational Christian Churches or joined the Conservative Congregational Christian Conference that formed earlier in 1945. During the forementioned period, its churches were organized nationally into a General Council, with parallel state conferences, sectional associations, and missionary instrumentalities. Congregations, however, retained their local autonomy and these groups were legally separate from the congregations.

The body came into being in Seattle, Washington, in 1931 by the merger of two American bodies that practiced congregational church governance, the National Council of the Congregational Churches of the United States and the General Convention of the Christian Church. Initially using the word "and" between the words "Congregational" and "Christian," the new denomination decided to combine the predecessor churches' identities into one nationally, while its constituent churches remained free to either retain their original names or adopt the new usage.

== Heritages ==
=== Congregationalism ===
Established by settlers in present-day New England fleeing religious persecution in their native England, the Congregational churches were identified with the Puritan theological and political perspective within Anglo-Saxon Protestantism during the 17th century. Many American historians have viewed their semi-democratic practices as laying the foundation for the representative nature of the U.S. political tradition. Although they were originally strongly Calvinist in the 18th century, eventually, by the 19th century, Congregationalists had accepted their peculiar vocation in U.S. religious life, maintaining a broadly orthodox faith while cultivating a passion for freedom, equality, and justice.

These ethical convictions would propel the Congregational churches into the forefront of social reform movements during the next 150 years or so. Most notable of these was strong support for the abolition of slavery among African Americans in the Southern U.S. In the aftermath of the American Civil War, numerous pastors and female schoolteacher missionaries, working under the auspices of the American Missionary Association, established academies, colleges, and churches for the freedpeople; six of the colleges are still in existence. Later generations became involved in causes such as temperance, women's suffrage, and the Social Gospel.

In the midst of this political involvement, Congregationalists held firmly to the notion that each local church was ruled directly by Jesus Christ, as testified to in the Bible and preached to those convicted by the Holy Spirit. Each thus constituted a spiritual republic unto itself, needing no authorization from outside ecclesiastical forces.

On the homefront, Congregationalism became primarily a grouping found among townspeople and affluent urban residents of New England, New York state, the Great Lakes region, portions of the Great Plains, and the Pacific Coast; roughly speaking, the Northern United States, a region strongly influenced by migrants from New England and New York. By the turn of the 20th century, the churches had begun to attract worshippers from outside their original base constituency of English-speaking Anglo-Americans. Immigrant groups that formed Congregational churches included Volga Germans, Swedes, Puerto Ricans, Chinese, Japanese, and Hawaiians. The Congregational churches also acquired two smaller church bodies: several Congregational Methodist churches in Alabama and Georgia, during the 1890s, and the Evangelical Protestant Churches in 1925, a German-immigrant group located primarily in and around Pittsburgh, Pennsylvania and Cincinnati, Ohio.

Theologically, during the 19th century the Congregationalists shifted gradually from adherence to orthodox Reformed concepts and teachings (e.g., total depravity, limited atonement) toward a decidedly more liberal orientation, facilitated by a group of Yale University-educated pastors in and around the time of the Civil War. Led by the likes of Horace Bushnell and Nathaniel Taylor, the New Divinity men broke, some would say irrevocably, with the older pessimistic views of human nature espoused by classical Congregationalist divines such as Cotton Mather and Jonathan Edwards, declaring instead a more sanguine view of possibilities for the individual and society. Even as this grand shift may have attracted individuals weary of overbearing, harsh harangues from generations of revivalist preachers, numerous others deplored what they felt was an abandonment of the true faith. Such conservatives, especially outside New England, increasingly sought refuge in churches that held to more rigid doctrine, such as the Baptists and the Presbyterians.

Congregationalist losses to Presbyterianism increased greatly in the decades in which the Plan of Union, was in effect. Although it was designed by Connecticut Congregationalists and the Presbyterian General Assembly to avoid duplication of effort in evangelizing the frontier regions, this plan resulted in numerous Congregational-founded parishes being annexed to presbyteries, usually through the pastor's affiliation and often without the local church's assent. The need to dissolve that failed attempt at inter-denominationalism, which had already taken place among the Presbyterians, prompted a national gathering of Congregationalists in 1865 at Boston, Massachusetts. This was the first national meeting in more than 200 years, since the 1648 synod that produced the Cambridge Platform, a confession of faith similar to the Presbyterians' Westminster Confession. It was not until 1870, though, that a sufficient number of Congregationalists responded to a related call to organize nationally.

This was not the first time American Congregationalism had been shaken to its foundations by theological change; the Great Awakenings of the decades surrounding the turn of the 19th century had also left indelible marks upon the churches. Some churches openly embraced revivalism at the time, while others, particularly in the Boston area, reacted negatively to the developments by adopting Arminian viewpoints in opposition to the intensified Calvinism espoused by such preachers as Edwards and George Whitefield. Following the Great Awakening, many of the liberalized congregations would eventually depart the Congregational fellowship in 1825 to form the American Unitarian Association; this body is now known as the Unitarian Universalist Association.

Meanwhile, despite the cherished commitments to independence and freedom, Congregationalists increasingly began to espouse the main aims of the ecumenical movement within American (and world) Protestantism. This movement had gathered much energy from the rise of totalitarian regimes in Europe during the first third of the 20th century, and a perceived decline in that period of religious life among Americans. Congregational leaders pursued close relations with numerous Protestant groups, but one group emerged as a prime candidate for actual organizational union: the Christian Churches.

=== The Christian Churches ("Connection") ===
While Puritans were consolidating their domination of religious, political and intellectual life in New England, elsewhere in America, during the period immediately before the American Revolution, many newly arrived settlers became dissatisfied with theology, preaching, liturgy, and ecclesiology inherited from Europe. Many of these people had turned to revivalist faiths such as the Methodists and the Baptists, and most found spiritual homes within those groups, or others deriving from the ferment started by the Great Awakenings.

However, in different parts of the country, several preachers led dissenting movements against the leadership of some of those churches. In the 1790s, James O'Kelly, a Methodist pastor serving churches in central North Carolina and southeastern Virginia, took exception to the development of an episcopacy within his church. He believed that the rise of bishops, strongly advocated by the likes of Francis Asbury, would approximate the powers of the recently disestablished Anglican church and thus unduly control the ministry, particularly through the practice of itinerancy. When leaders ignored O'Kelly's protests, he and some sympathizers withdrew from the Methodist Church to form a body originally known as the "Republican Methodist Church." Upon extensive discussion and prayer, O'Kelly began to hold that the name implied a sectarianism that was quite at odds with what he felt were prescriptions from the New Testament prohibiting churches from identifying with mere human opinions. Thus, he and others arrived at the notion that their churches should bear simply the name of "Christian."

Several hundred miles to the north in Vermont, a Baptist preacher by the name of Abner Jones began to refute the then-prevalent Calvinist dogmas within his fellowship. He led some of his followers out of his congregation into a new fellowship founded upon a platform similar to O'Kelly's, with a strong emphasis upon open communion and freedom of conscience. Later in the first decade of the 19th century, he and a New Hampshire pastor began publishing a newspaper for the movement, Herald of Gospel Liberty, reputed by some historians to have been the first general-interest religious periodical in the U.S. The movement progressed throughout New England, especially within those two states, as well as Maine and Massachusetts. Adherents of the Congregational "Standing Order" treated the new churches in a generally hostile fashion.

Both movements were restorationist in outlook, and influenced the later Stone-Campbell Restoration Movement. That later movement produced several larger groups that continue to operate today: the Christian Church (Disciples of Christ), the Christian churches and churches of Christ, and the Churches of Christ.

The geographically disparate Northern and Southern wings of the Christian movement did eventually discover each other, and they formed a convention in 1820. At that time, they agreed on a general list of five (some scholars have claimed six) principles unifying the otherwise diverse congregations. The unity did not survive engrossing controversies over slavery and the ensuing Civil War. The "Christian Connection," as was also the case with American Protestant groups such as the Methodists, Presbyterians, and Baptists, split once again into Northern and Southern factions. The Northern group catalyzed the split, as many of its leaders, much like those of the Congregationalists, strongly denounced slavery. The Northerners used the schism as an occasion to legally take denominational form, in 1850. Despite the bitterness of the split, Christians in both sections reunited much sooner than did the other separated groups, forming the General Convention of the Christian Church in 1890.

Many Southern/O'Kelly Christians owned slaves, some of whom formed churches of their own in that tradition after the Emancipation Proclamation. Centered in central and eastern North Carolina and southeastern Virginia, African-American Christian congregations formed the Afro-Christian Convention in 1892. This convention existed until 1950, well after the Congregational Christian merger; that year it joined the Convention of the South, heretofore composed of Congregational churches founded by the American Missionary Association.

Theologically, the Christian Churches did not encourage a highly elaborate system of doctrine or Biblical interpretation. Relatively few of their ministers were educated past the elementary grades, a characteristic that persisted well into the early 20th century. Their leanings were toward revivalist Wesleyanism, emphasizing traditional evangelical themes such as regeneration, acceptance of personal salvation, and the performance of good works of charity. Few if any of their members were inherently predisposed toward polemical attacks upon other traditions, although some pastors and churches would eventually identify with the emerging fundamentalist movement in later decades.

By the time that the Congregationalists had approached Christian leaders about possible union, some disaffected adherents of the wing of Restoration Movement led by Barton Stone and Alexander Campbell had joined the Christian Connection. This group gave the movement a geographical complexion that entailed pockets of strength in New England, upstate New York, southeastern Virginia, central and eastern North Carolina, western Georgia, eastern Alabama, southwestern Ohio, and eastern Indiana, with dispersed congregations in parts of the Great Plains. Most of the membership was rural, outside major cities, usually engaged in farming or similar occupations.

The Christians founded schools such as Ohio's Defiance College and Antioch College and North Carolina's Elon University; during the early 20th century, an academy and seminary for African Americans operated in Franklinton, North Carolina. Defiance continues to relate to the United Church of Christ today.

== Early post-merger years ==
After the 1931 merger, relatively few practices and customs changed drastically within either of the uniting traditions, largely because its members, like most Americans, were overwhelmed by, first, the Great Depression, and, later, World War II. It would not be until after the latter concluded that the CC churches would embark on anything like a major church extension program; this was the case, of course, with most U.S. denominations during this period, as their churches often struggled to merely stay open, with little or nothing left over for mission work.

Congregationalists constituted about 85-90% of the membership of the new denomination; this caused few if any resentments or conflicts because, by and large, the two groups did not overlap each other geographically, except in parts of New England, upstate New York, Ohio, and among African-American churches in North Carolina. Regional judicatories and national domestic and foreign mission agencies merged quite smoothly, often continuing to use varying terminologies (e.g., "convention," "conference," "association"), depending on custom. On the domestic front, most of the new church planting efforts were concentrated in newly developing areas such as southern California, Arizona, Florida, and suburbs of major Midwestern cities (e.g., Chicago, Detroit, Minneapolis). Abroad, many CC missionary efforts shifted their emphases toward medical and social services, particularly after many of the churches Congregationalists had founded in earlier decades had formed autonomous bodies of their own.

One distinguishing trait of the new fellowship, aside from its unusually tolerant attitude regarding subscription to ancient doctrines, was its bold enthusiasm for ecumenical adventures, especially those growing out of the "Faith and Order" and "Life and Work" inter-church initiatives in Great Britain in the 1920s and 1930s. These developments and others led to the founding of the World Council of Churches in 1948, of which the Congregational Christian Churches was a charter member. In the U.S., the Congregational Christians made several overtures to other Protestant groups toward federative unions and/or organic mergers in the years before World War II. But the main legacy of those discussions was what became the United Church of Christ in 1957.

== UCC merger talks ==
The Rev. Dr. Truman Douglass, pastor of St. Louis' Pilgrim Congregational Church, met with the Rev. Dr. Samuel Press, president of Eden Theological Seminary in that city, a seminary of the Evangelical and Reformed Church, a denomination predominantly of German origin and itself a merger of two previously separated traditions, as part of an informal interchurch discussion group in 1937. Douglass' and Press' talks led to the involvement of both bodies in proposals to consider organic union, work that eventually culminated in the Basis of Union in 1943, which both national bodies approved after a five-year period of revising. The Rev. Dr. Douglas Horton, a former Harvard Divinity School dean, had become the CC general minister and president by this point, and became the prime figure in the CC union efforts.

=== "Continuing Congregationalism" ===
However, a small but vocal minority of ministers and laymen protested the developments, charging that any merger with a confessional, presbyterial body such as the E&R Church would destroy the heritage and structure of American Congregationalism. These opponents formed groups that published pamphlets and attempted to persuade churches to reject the proposed merger. An anti-merger congregation in Brooklyn filed suit against the CC moderator, Helen Kenyon, in 1949 to legally stop the merger proceedings; the major legal contention made by the church and the anti-union advocates was that the CC General Council possessed no authority to enter into a merger as a national entity. After some initial victories in lower courts, a New York state Court of Appeals declined jurisdiction and judged in favor of Ms. Kenyon and the CC Churches in 1953. With this defeat, the anti-merger forces turned instead toward forming a new denomination, which became the National Association of Congregational Christian Churches, founded in 1955; a preponderance of these churches were located in non-metropolitan New England, southeastern Michigan, parts of Wisconsin and Illinois, and southern California. Some years before that, motivated by different concerns, chiefly doctrine, a group of evangelical-leaning congregations formed the Conservative Congregational Christian Conference, in 1948.

=== Union approved ===
The final vote on participation by the General Council of Congregational Christian Churches in the UCC merger took place at the 1956 General Council, meeting in Omaha, Nebraska. Eighty-eight (88) percent of the delegates approved the motion to unite with the Evangelical and Reformed Church, and the latter body's General Synod approved by an even wider margin. This set the stage for the Uniting General Synod, which took place in Cleveland, Ohio, on June 25, 1957; the General Council of Congregationalism Christian Churches were represented by the Rev. Fred Hoskins, who had succeeded Horton some years earlier as general minister and president. Hoskins would become, along with E&R President James Wagner, one of the co-presidents of the UCC. The actual consummation of the UCC, however, did not occur until 1961, when a sufficient number of CC congregations voted to approve the denomination's new constitution.

The CC Churches brought into the new UCC approximately 1.4 million members, about 60 percent of the total number of members in the new denomination. In order to attend to necessary legal business continuing from years past, the General Council remained incorporated until 1984, when it finally dissolved.

== See also ==
- S. Parkes Cadman, prominent minister and leader of the Congregational Christian Churches in the early 20th century
- Christian Connection
