= Frederick Augustus Rauch =

American educator and founding president of Marshall College (1806–1841)

1st President of Marshall College
- In office 1836–1841
- Succeeded by: John Williamson Nevin

Personal details
- Born: July 27, 1806 Kirchbracht, Hesse-Darmstadt
- Died: March 2, 1841 (aged 34) Mercersburg, Pennsylvania
- Education: University of Marburg; University of Giessen; University of Heidelberg
- Occupation: Professor

Academic background
- Thesis: In Sophoclis Electram observationes (1827)
- Influences: Karl Daub

Academic work
- Era: 19th-century philosophy
- Discipline: Philosophy; Theology
- Region: Western philosophy; German philosophy; American philosophy
- School or tradition: Mercersburg theology German idealism
- Institutions: University of Giessen; University of Heidelberg; Lafayette College; Marshall College
- Notable works: Psychology; Or, A View of the Human Soul (1840)
- Influenced: John Williamson Nevin; Emanuel Vogel Gerhart

Frederick Augustus Rauch (July 27, 1806 – March 2, 1841) was a German-born American professor, philosopher, and the founding president of Marshall College. Rauch was a professor at the University of Giessen, but was persecuted for his political beliefs in Germany and sought asylum in the United States.

As a professor of systematic theology and philosophy, Rauch was critical to the development of Mercersburg Theology, alongside his colleagues Philip Schaff and John Williamson Nevin. Rauch's Psychology (1840) introduced Hegelian dialectics to the United States and was the first American text to use the term 'psychology.'

== Early life ==
=== Germany ===
Rauch was born Frederich Augustus Rauch in Kirchbracht, Hessee-Darmstadt on July 27, 1806. Rauch's mother died when he was an infant and he was raised by his father, the clergyman Heinrich Rauch. Rauch was sent to a private primary school from early childhood, where he excelled and graduated early.

Rauch entered the University of Marburg when he was 18, graduating with top honors three years later in 1827. His thesis, written in Latin, was a philosophical discussion of Sophocles' play Electra. After graduating, Rauch studied at the University of Giessen for one year while serving as an assistant for his uncle. After Giessen, Rauch moved to study at the University of Heidelberg.

At Heidelberg, Rauch was mentored by Karl Daub. Rauch was inspired by Daub's theological instruction and pursued a career as a professor of theology. Upon leaving Heidelberg, the government appointed Rauch as a lecturer at the University of Giessen at 24 years old. This was rare, as Joseph Henry Dubbs described: "Such an appointment at so early an age has to my knowledge only once been repeated in this century, viz., in the case of Friedrich Nietzsche, who is considered the profoundest philosophical thinker of modern Germany."

=== Asylum in America ===
Rauch was offered a full professorship at the Heidelberg University in 1831. However, Rauch's employment was jeapordized when he made a public speech about government and offended local authorities. Rauch was forced to flee the country, rushing to visit his father at midnight to inform him that Rauch was sailing for America.

Rauch landed in America in fall 1831, then headed for Easton, Pennsylvania. In Easton, he learned English and gave lessons on the pianoforte. While learning English, Rauch was appointed as a professor of German at Lafayette College.

==== Move to York ====
Rauch's fluency in German, Greek, Latin, and English earned recognition from German authorities in York, Pennsylvania. The York German Reformed Church appointed him principal of a new academy for classical instruction. Rauch implemented a European-style classical curriculum modeled off German universities, focusing on literary studies and debate. Emanuel Vogel Gerhart was one of his students at the York academy, helping to found the Diagnothian Literary Society.

In York, Rauch was ordained as a minister and appointed as professor of biblical literature in the Theological Seminary of the Reformed Church.

=== Marshall College ===
In 1835, Rauch and the academy moved to Mercersburg, Pennsylvania. Mercersburg brought more students and financial resources, upgrading the academy into Marshall College in 1836. As principal of the former academy, Rauch became the first president of the new college.

== Personal life ==
In private life, Rauch passionately espoused his beliefs. After fleeing Germany for expressing his political beliefs, Rauch was described as intellectually and personally "communicative" by American colleagues.

While serving as president of Marshall College, Rauch died on March 2, 1841 and he was buried in Mercersburg. His remains were later moved to Lancaster, Pennsylvania.

== Writings ==
Learned in German philosophy and theology, especially Hegelian thought, Rauch's particular contribution was the writing of his book Psychology: Or, A View of the Human Soul; Including Anthropology. This was the first English exposition of Hegelian philosophy for an American audience.

Rauch's papers are preserved by the E&R Library and Archives at the Lancaster Theological Seminary.

== Legacy ==
Rauch left unfinished writings on "Christian Ethics" and "Aesthetics" when he died. Edited by his former student Emanuel Vogel Gerhart, his sermons were posthumously published under the title The Inner Life of the Christian.

Emanuel Vogel Gerhart later succeeded Rauch as president of Franklin & Marshall College, dedicating his treatise An Introduction to the Study of Philosophy to Rauch's legacy.

=== Reinterment of remains ===
After Rauch's death, Marshall College merged with Franklin College in Lancaster, Pennsylvania to become Franklin & Marshall College. Rauch was buried on the campus of Marshall College, which moved to Lancaster when the two institutions merged. In July 1856, the Franklin & Marshall Board of Trustees applied to reinter Rauch's grave in Lancaster after a request from the Alumni Association.

Franklin & Marshall College reinterred Rauch in Lancaster on March 8, 1859. The new funeral ceremony was officiated by professor T. C. Porter with Rauch's successor John Williamson Nevin offering the eulogy, which was published.
