= Franklin & Marshall Diplomats =

Intercollegiate athletics teams of Franklin & Marshall College

- University: Franklin & Marshall College
- Nickname: Diplomats; Blue and Whites; Nevonians (historical)
- NCAA: Division III; Division I (wrestling)
- Conference: Centennial Conference; EIWA (wrestling)
- Athletic director: Lauren Packer Webster
- Location: Lancaster, Pennsylvania
- First year: 1886; 140 years ago
- Varsity teams: 28
- Football stadium: Shadek Stadium
- Basketball arena: Mayser Gymnasium
- Baseball stadium: Penn Medicine Park
- Colors: Blue, white, and light blue
- Mascot: Benjamin Franklin (historical); John Marshall (historical)
- Fight song: Down the Field; Hail! Hail! Nevonia (historical)
- Website: godiplomats.com

Team NCAA championships
- 4

The Franklin & Marshall Diplomats are the 28 intercollegiate athletic teams that represent Franklin & Marshall College. The Diplomats are founding members of the Centennial Conference in the NCAA Division III. In wrestling, the Diplomats compete in the NCAA Division I, where they are members of the Eastern Intercollegiate Wrestling Association (EIWA).

Originally known as the Nevonians, in honor of John Williamson Nevin, the program acquired the Diplomat nickname after a well-received football game played against Fordham University in 1935. The Diplomats boast 138 conference titles and 4 NCAA-recognized national titles, including the ISFA 1952 men's soccer title, the 1985 NCAA Division III women's cross country, and two NCAA Division III women's lacrosse titles.

== History ==
Organized athletics began at Franklin & Marshall College in 1886 when the school joined forces with the University of Pennsylvania, Swarthmore College, Lehigh University, Lafayette College, and Haverford College to found the short-lived Inter-state Athletic Association.

Football was the first sport to take hold at F&M, garnering widespread support from the student body. The student newspaper Student Weekly remarked that any student absent from football games was a "plain, ordinary slacker and you don't belong here."

=== Football ===
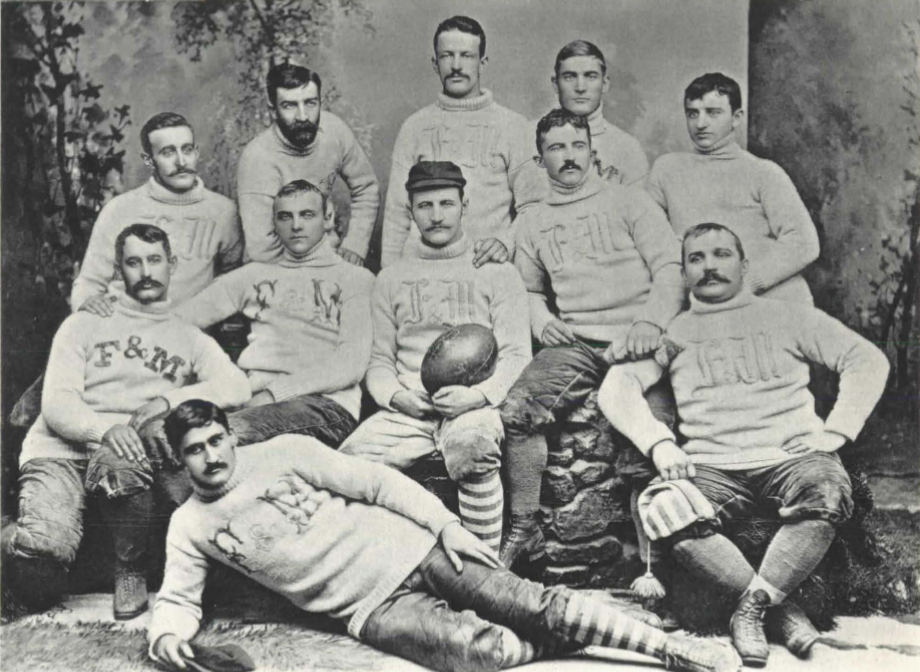
F&M football team of 1890

The Franklin & Marshall Diplomats football program was first organized in 1886 by Seminary student Miles O. Noll. Franklin and Marshall was defeated 9–0 by the York YMCA. Later that year, the program played a re-match and lost again, this time by a score of 6–4. Frank Mount Pleasant became the head football coach in 1910.

=== Wrestling ===
Professor Charles W. Mayser founded the F&M wrestling team in 1923, and early 1924 saw the college's first wrestling match as the Blue & White defeated Western Maryland College 24–5. The Diplomat grapplers finished their maiden season with a 4–1 record. F&M wrestling has competed in the EIWA since 1948, making F&M the only Division III school to compete in Division I wrestling.

=== Basketball ===
The men's basketball team started play in 1899. They have reached the NCAA Division III Final Four on five occasions (1979, 1991, 1996, 2000, 2009), appearing in the national championship game in 1991. The men's basketball team has been nationally ranked on a frequent basis since the late 1970s, including No. 1 in Division III at some point during seven different seasons. Head coach Glenn Robinson is the career leader in wins in Division III. Robinson has been listed as one of the top 100 college basketball coaches of all-time.

Other varsity sports

Other successful athletic teams at F&M include men's soccer, men's and women's swimming, baseball, and squash. They all traditionally compete for conference championships and have been ranked high nationally. In 2008, the men's swimming team won the Centennial Conference championships and the women's swimming team placed second. At that championship, Thomas Anthony Grabiak Jr. of F&M set Centennial Conference championship meet records in the 100 and 200 yd breaststroke events. Men's squash consistently maintains a top 20 Division I national ranking. In 1987 the men's squash team finished 15-1 and achieved a #2 national ranking led by four time all-American Morris Clothier. In 1988, the men's lacrosse team finished the season 13-3 and played in the USILA national semifinals.

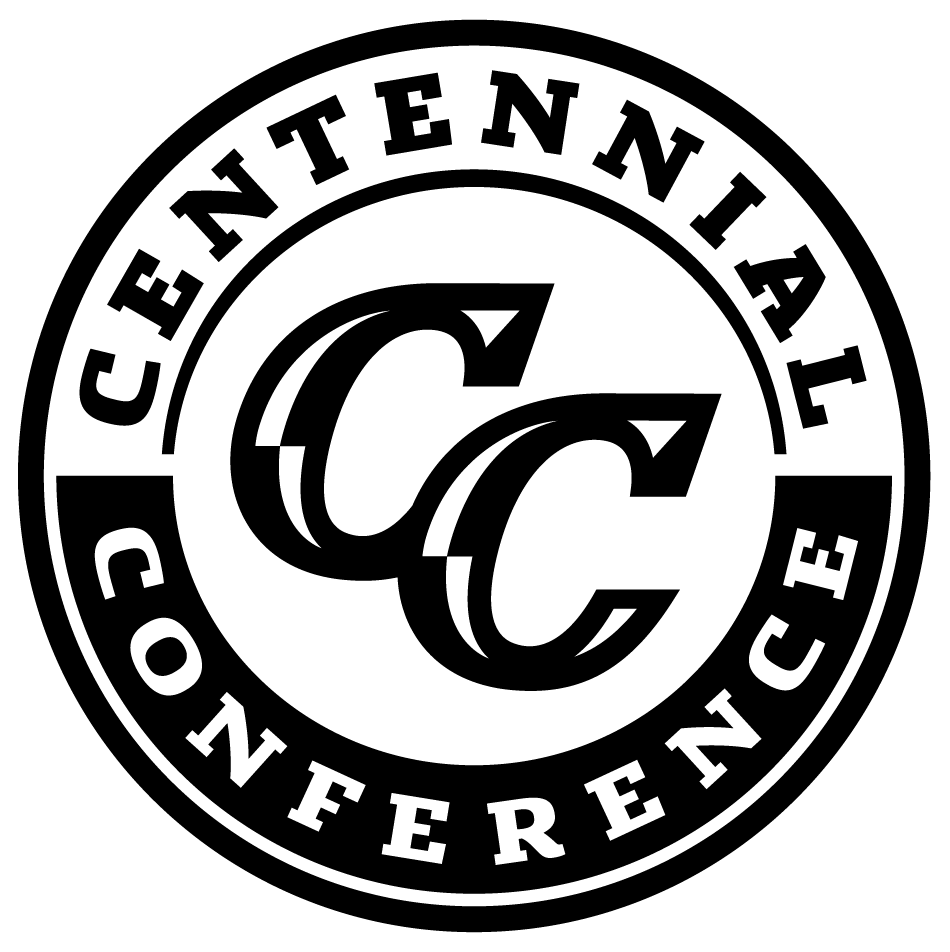
Centennial Conference logo

=== Founding the Centennial Conference ===
On June 4, 1981, F&M President Keith Spalding announced the formation of the football-only Centennial Football Conference. Headquartered on Franklin and Marshall's campus, the Diplomats led Dickinson College, Gettysburg College, Johns Hopkins University, Muhlenberg College, Swarthmore College, Ursinus College, and Western Maryland College as founding members of the conference.

The conference existed as a football-only conference until 1992, when a commissioner's report recommended sponsoring other sports. In 1992, Bryn Mawr College, Haverford College, and Washington College were invited as additional charter members of the refounded, all-sports Centennial Conference.

== Varsity sports ==
F&M competes in NCAA Division III for all varsity sports except wrestling, which is Division I, and men's and women's squash, which are non-divisional.

Men's sports	Women's sports
Football	Volleyball
Baseball	Softball
Basketball	Basketball
Cross country	Cross country
Golf	Golf
Soccer	Soccer
Tennis	Tennis
Track & Field†	Track & Field†
Lacrosse	Lacrosse
Swimming	Swimming
Wrestling	Field hockey
Rowing	Rowing
Squash	Squash
† – Track and field includes both indoor and outdoor.

== Club sports ==
F&M also boasts several student-run clubs, most notably men's and women's rugby, both of which have become serious contenders for regional, and national championships each season and which compete in the Eastern Pennsylvania Rugby Union. Ultimate frisbee is also a popular club sport on campus, fielding both a men's and a women's team. In 2009, the college water polo team was revived and currently competes in the American Water Polo League and the Collegiate Water Polo League.

== Venues ==
=== Sponaugle–Williamson Field ===
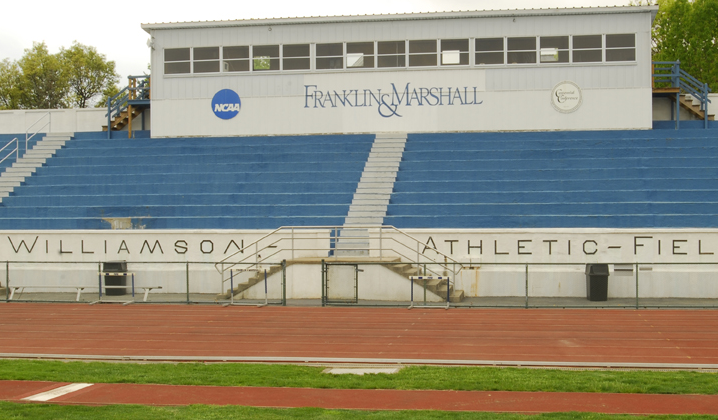
Sponaugle–Williamson Field

Sponaugle–Williamson Field is a stadium for the outdoor athletic teams of the college. It was built in 1920 as Williamson Field, named after S. Woodrow Sponaugle, who coached football and basketball and was the athletic director at F&M for 15 years. He shares the stadium's dedication with Henry S. Williamson, who was a trustee of the college from 1894 to 1917.

=== Shadek Stadium ===
Shadek Stadium is used for football and lacrosse. Construction began in the fall of 2016 and ended in the fall of 2017. The stadium was named after the Shadek family, a family prominent at the school. The turf field in the stadium, Gilburg Field, is named after football player and former F&M coach Tom Gilburg. In the first football game played in the stadium, the Diplomats defeated Centennial Conference rivals Dickinson College 56–0.

=== Penn Medicine Park ===
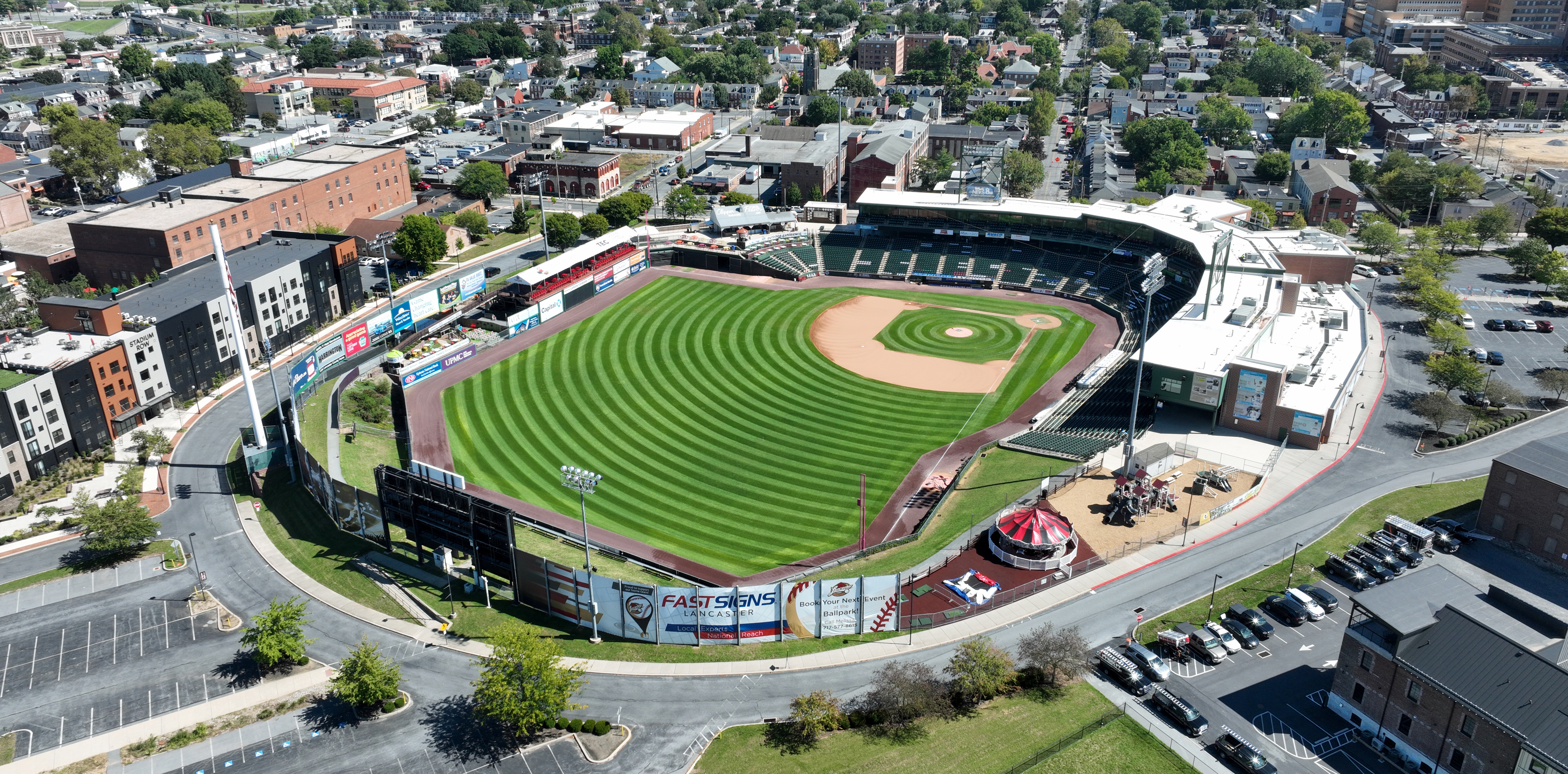
Penn Medicine Park

In 2026, the Minor League Lancaster Stormers and Franklin & Marshall reached an agreement for the Stormers' Penn Medicine Park to be the official home for Diplomats baseball. Constructed in 2004 as Clipper Magazine Stadium, Penn Medicine is sponsored by the University of Pennsylvania Health System and seats 8,000 attendees.

On February 28, 2026, the Diplomats inaugurated their new stadium with a 3-0 victory over the Hobart Statesmen.
