= Scholar =

Person who pursues academic and intellectual activities

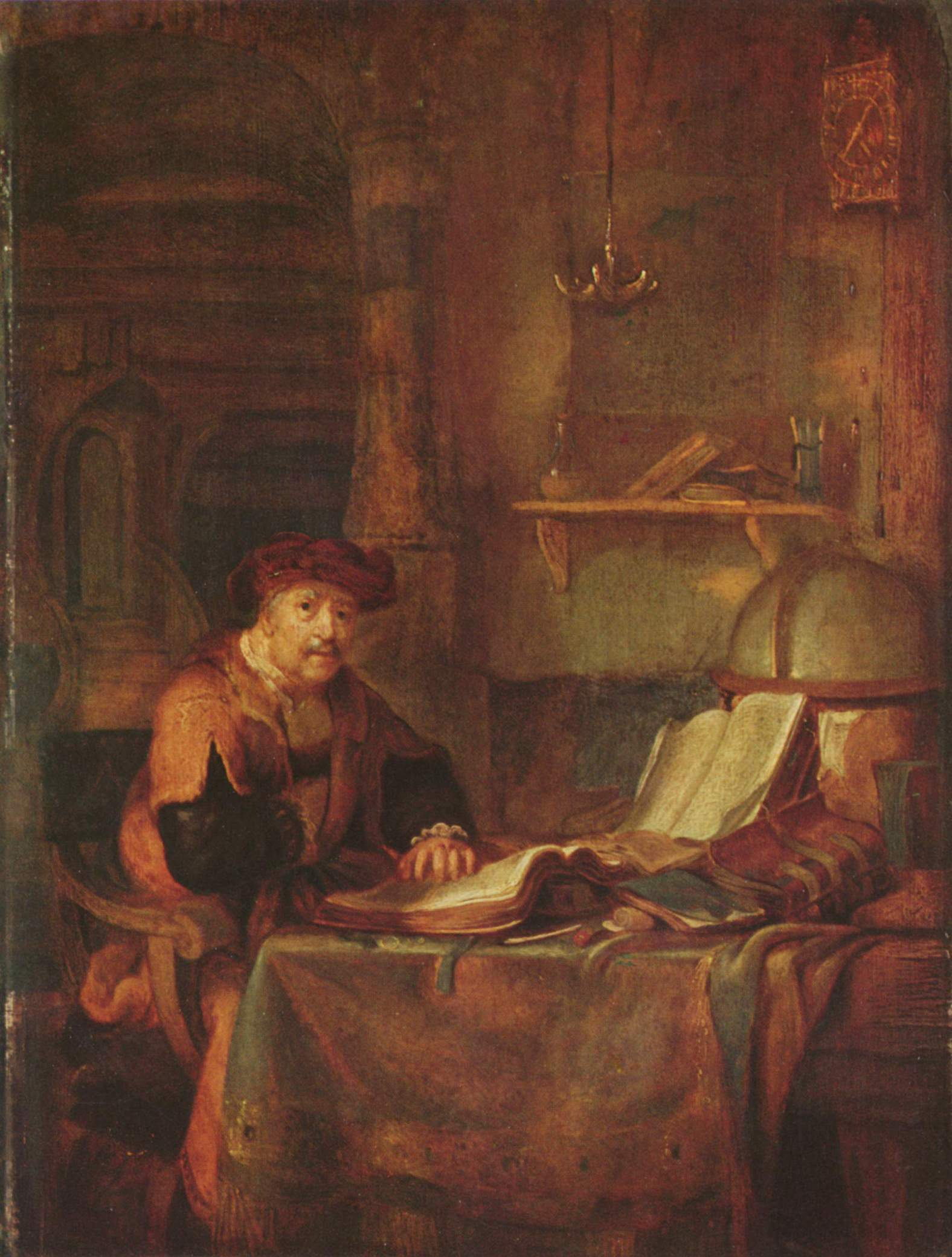
The Scholar and His Books by Gerbrand van den Eeckhout

A scholar is a person who is a researcher or has expertise in an academic discipline. A scholar can also be an academic, who works as a professor, teacher, or researcher at a university. An academic usually holds an advanced degree or a terminal degree, such as a master's degree or a doctorate. Independent scholars and public intellectuals work outside the academy yet may publish in academic journals and participate in scholarly public discussion.

== Definitions ==
In contemporary English usage, the term scholar sometimes is equivalent to the term academic, and describes a university-educated individual who has achieved intellectual mastery of an academic discipline, as instructor and as researcher. Moreover, before the establishment of universities, the term scholar identified and described an intellectual person whose primary occupation was professional research. In 1847, minister Emanuel Vogel Gerhart spoke of the role of the scholar in society:

[A] scholar [is one] whose whole inward intellectual and moral being has been symmetrically unfolded, disciplined and strengthened under the influence of truth... No one faculty should be drawn out to the neglect of others. The whole inner man should be unfolded harmoniously.

Gerhart argued that a scholar can not be focused on a single discipline, contending that knowledge of multiple disciplines is necessary to put each into context and to inform the development of each:

[T]o be a scholar involves more than mere learning... A genuine scholar possesses something more: he penetrates and understands the principle and laws of the particular department of human knowledge with which he professes acquaintance. He imbibes the life of Science... [and] his mind is transfused and moulded by its energy and spirit.

A 2011 examination outlined the following attributes commonly accorded to scholars as "described by many writers, with some slight variations in the definition":

The common themes are that a scholar is a person who has a high intellectual ability, is an independent thinker and an independent actor, has ideas that stand apart from others, is persistent in her quest for developing knowledge, is systematic, has unconditional integrity, has intellectual honesty, has some convictions, and stands alone to support these convictions.

Scholars may rely on the scholarly method or scholarship, a body of principles and practices used by scholars to make their claims about the world as valid and trustworthy as possible, and to make them known to the scholarly public. It is the methods that systemically advance the teaching, research, and practice of a given scholarly or academic field of study through rigorous inquiry. Scholarship is creative, can be documented, can be replicated or elaborated, and can be and is peer-reviewed through various methods.

== Role in society ==
Scholars have generally been upheld as credible figures of high social standing who are engaged in work important to society. In Imperial China, from 206 BC to 1912, the intellectuals were the Scholar-officials (or 'scholar-gentlemen'): civil servants appointed by the Emperor of China to perform the tasks of daily governance. Such civil servants earned academic degrees by means of Imperial examination, and also were skilled calligraphers, and knew Confucian philosophy. Historian Wing-Tsit Chan concludes that:

Generally speaking, the record of these scholar-gentlemen has been a worthy one. It was good enough to be praised and imitated in 18th-century Europe. Nevertheless, it has given China a tremendous handicap in their transition from government by men to government by law, and personal considerations in Chinese government have been a curse.

In Joseon Korea (1392–1910), the intellectuals were the literati, who knew how to read and write, and were designated as the chungin ('middle people') in accordance with the Confucian system. Socially, they constituted the petite bourgeoisie, composed of scholar-bureaucrats (i.e., scholars, professionals, and technicians) who administered the rule of the Joseon dynasty.

In an 1847 address, Emanuel Vogel Gerhart asserted that scholars have an obligation to rigorously continue their studies, so as to remain aware of new knowledge being generated, and to contribute their own insights to the body of knowledge available to all:

The progress of science involves momentous interests. It merits the attention of all sincere lovers of truth. Every ...scholar is under obligations to contribute towards the ever-progressive unfolding of its riches and power. [They]...should combine their energies to bring to view what has eluded the keen vision of those men of noble intellectual stature who have lived and died before them.

Many scholars are also professors who teach others. In many countries, the title "Research Professor" refers to a person primarily engaged in research, with few or no teaching obligations. The title is used in this sense in the United Kingdom, where it is known as "research professor" at some universities, and "professorial research fellow" at other institutions, and in northern Europe. Research Professor is quite often the most senior rank of a research-focused career in the U.K and northern Europe, and is regarded as equal in rank to a teaching full professorship. Frequently, the job of research professor is permanent, like a tenured professor in the U.S., and the position is held by a particularly distinguished scholar. Thus, the title is seen as more prestigious than a teaching full professorship.

A research professorship has a somewhat similar sense of prestige in the United States, except that research professors in the U.S. are often non-permanent positions that must fund their salaries from external sources. This is not the case in most other countries.

== Independent scholars ==
An independent scholar is anyone who conducts scholarly research outside universities and traditional academia. In 2010, twelve percent of US history scholars were independent. The University of British Columbia's website states that to be 'recognized as a scholar', a Master's degree or PhD is 'generally expected' but exceptions exist depending on the individual's 'quality of scholarship'. In history, independent scholars can be differentiated from popular history hosts for television shows and amateur historians "by the level to which their publications utilize the analytical rigour and academic writing style".

In previous centuries, some independent scholars achieved renown, such as Samuel Johnson and Edward Gibbon during the 18th century and Charles Darwin and Karl Marx in the 19th century, and Sigmund Freud, Sir Steven Runciman, Robert Davidsohn and Nancy Sandars in the 20th century. There was also a tradition of the man of letters, such as Evelyn Waugh. The term "man of letters" derives from the French term belletrist or homme de lettres but is not synonymous with "an academic". In the 17th and 18th centuries, the term Belletrist(s) came to be applied to the literati: the French participants in—sometimes referred to as "citizens" of—the Republic of Letters, which evolved into the salon aimed at edification, education, and cultural refinement.

In the United States, a professional association exists for independent scholars: this association is the National Coalition of Independent Scholars. In Canada, the equivalent professional association is the Canadian Academy of Independent Scholars (in association with Simon Fraser University). Similar organizations exist around the world. Membership in a professional association generally entails a degree of post-secondary education and established research. When independent scholars participate in academic conferences, they may be referred to as an unaffiliated scholar, since they do not hold a position in a university or other institution.

While independent scholars may earn an income from part-time teaching, speaking engagements, or consultant work, the University of British Columbia calls earning an income the biggest challenge of being an independent scholar. Due to challenges of making a living as a scholar without an academic position, "[m]any independent scholars depend on having a gainfully employed partner". To get access to libraries and other research facilities, independent scholars have to seek permission from universities.

Writer Megan Kate Nelson's article "Stop Calling Me Independent" says the term "marginalizes unaffiliated scholars" and is unfairly seen as an indicator of "professional failure". Rebecca Bodenheimer says that independent scholars, like herself, attending conferences and who also do not have a university name on their official name badge, feel like the "independent scholar" term is perceived as a "signal that a scholar is either unwanted by the academy or unwilling to commit to the sacrifices necessary to succeed as an academic".

== See also ==
- Category:Scholars and academics – The category of scholars, people who study a field
- Scholarism (學民思潮) Hong Kong political movement
- Scholarship
- Scholasticism
- Autodidacticism
- Citizen science
