= Emanuel Vogel Gerhart =

American scholar and minister of the German Reformed Church

1st President of Franklin & Marshall College
- In office 1853 - 1866
- Preceded by: John Williamson Nevin (Marshall College)
- Succeeded by: John Williamson Nevin

1st President of Heidelberg College
- In office 1851 - 1853

Personal details
- Born: June 13, 1817 Freeburg, Pennsylvania
- Died: May 6, 1904 (aged 86) Lancaster, Pennsylvania
- Education: Marshall College (BA); Mercersburg Theological Seminary (DD)
- Occupation: College administrator Pastor; Professor

Academic background
- Influences: Frederick Augustus Rauch

Academic work
- Discipline: Christian philosophy
- Institutions: Franklin & Marshall College; Heidelberg College; Heidelberg Theological Seminary; Lancaster Theological Seminary
- Notable ideas: Mercersburg Theology

Emanuel Vogel Gerhart (June 13, 1817 – May, 6 1904) was an American Reformed Church minister. Gerhart was an influential leader and theologian within 19th century Mercersburg theology.

Gerhart led Heidelberg College as its first president from 1851 to 1853. Gerhart left Heidelberg to become the first president of Franklin and Marshall College after the merger of Franklin College and Marshall College, his alma mater.

== Early life and education ==
Gerhart was born on June 13, 1817, in Freeburg, Snyder County, Pennsylvania. His parents were the Reverend Isaac Gerhart (1788–1865) and Sarah Vogel Gerhart (1790–1861).

Gerhart's great-grandfather, Peter Gerhart, emigrated from the town of Alsace, France, to Bucks County, Pennsylvania, in the early 18th century. Emmanuel Gerhart's mother, of French descent, grew up in Philadelphia but was born in Northhampton, PA, while his father led ministries of German Reformed churches in several counties, including Union County, Snyder County, and Lancaster County, Pennsylvania.

=== Marshall College ===
Gerhart received private religious instruction under Frederick Augustus Rauch in York, Pennsylvania. The school included a rigorous training in philosophy, history, math, science, Greek and Latin based on the German education system. At this school, Gerhart was one of the first members and developers of the Diagnothian Literary Society in 1835.

Rauch moved his school to Mercersburg, Pennsylvania in 1836, becoming Marshall College. Gerhart and the Diagnothian Literary Society followed Rauch, joining the new college. Gerhart would graduated from Marshall College in 1838 and from Mercersburg Theological Seminary in 1841. At the seminary, Gerhart studied under Frederick Augustus Rauch and John Williamson Nevin, who were leading figures in the founding of Mercersburg Theology. During this time, Gerhart became a teacher at the Preparatory Department of Education and at the school for young women.

== Mercersburg theologian and College president ==
=== Preaching ===
Gerhart began his ministry work during his studies at seminary and was approved by the Synod of the Reformed Church to minister in Reading, Pennsylvania. In 1849, Gerhart worked with the First Reformed Church in Cincinnati, Ohio. There he ministered to German immigrants and later traveled various states including Kentucky, Indiana, and Wisconsin to form new congregations. Starting in 1843, Gerhart would become an elected representative to the various church Synods and the General Synod in Baltimore.

=== College leadership ===
He served as the inaugural president of Heidelberg College in 1851 under the German Reformed Church. While president of Heidelberg, Gerhart accepted a separate appointment as professor of theology at the Heidelberg Theological Seminary.

whence he was called to the presidency of Franklin and Marshall College in 1853, where he held the title as Professor of Mental and Moral Philosophy. As president, Gerhart campaigned for the college to decrease debts and increase the student body and lead the college during the time of the Civil War. In 1868, he was appointed professor of Systematic Theology at Mercersburg Theological Seminary, today called Lancaster Theological Seminary in Lancaster, Pennsylvania. He would continue there as president and professor for the rest of his life. Gerhart was also the editor of the Mercerbsburg Review journal for several years.

During his time as professor and president, Gerhart delivered several speeches. He was known to be very gregarious and articulate in speech. According to the Alumni Association of Franklin and Marshall, "his unruffled manner, his deliberateness of speech and the logical cast of his mind always came into service." He was said to have displayed a particular "energy and endurance" and had a strong and engaging presence at college events and games.

While president of Franklin & Marshall, Vogel published An Introduction to the Study of Philosophy and dedicated the treatise to his mentor and Marshall College's first president Frederick Augustus Rauch.

== Works ==
Gerhart's works include over 60 articles published at the Mercersburg Review and the following:

- Relation of Religion and Science: An Address, Delivered before the Alumni Association of Marshall College (1842)
- An Introduction to the Study of Philosophy with an Outline Treatise on Logic (1857)
- Christ the Source of Salvation, Lancaster, PA: Inquirer Printing and Publishing Company (1875)
- Lectures on the Heidelberg Catechism, Lancaster, PA: Lecture Pringint Society of the Theological Seminary of the Reformed Church (1891)
- Prolegomena to Christian Dogmatics (1891)
- Institutes of Christian Religion (1891, 1894)

== See also ==
- German Reformed Church
- German Americans
- Mercersburg Theology
- American philosophy
- List of American philosophers
