= Henry Harbaugh Apple =

American clergyman and college president (1869–1943)

5th President of Franklin & Marshall College
- In office 1910 - 1935
- Preceded by: John Summers Stahr
- Succeeded by: John Ahlum Schaeffer

Personal details
- Born: November 8, 1869 Mercersburg, Pennsylvania
- Died: May 19, 1943 (aged 73) Lancaster, Pennsylvania
- Education: Franklin and Marshall College (AB, AM); Lancaster Theological Seminary (DD)
- Occupation: Pastor; College administrator

Academic work
- Discipline: Theology
- Institutions: Franklin & Marshall College

Henry Harbaugh Apple (November 8, 1869 – May 19, 1943) was an American clergyman and educator born in Mercersburg, Pennsylvania. He graduated from Franklin and Marshall College in 1889 and from the Theological Seminary of the Reformed Church in 1892. Ordained to the ministry of his denomination, he became pastor of St. John's Church in Philadelphia (1892) and of Trinity Church in York, Pennsylvania. In 1905 he was president of the Potomac Synod of the Reformed Church. In 1909 he was chosen president of Franklin and Marshall College.

== Biography ==
Apple was the son of Thomas Gilmore Apple, who served as president of Franklin and Marshall College from 1878 to 1890, and Emma Apple (née Miller). Graduating from Lancaster High School in 1885 as his class's valedictorian, he received a bachelor's and master's degree from Franklin and Marshall College in 1889 and 1892. Afterwards, "feeling called to the ministry", he began attending the Lancaster Theological Seminary, graduating from there the same year.

Apple was ordained to ministry and installed as the pastor of St. John's Church in Philadelphia, where he paid off $8,000 in debt and began efforts to make the church self-sufficient. He was credited with the "strength and prosperity" of St. John's Church. Later, in 1898, he was appointed pastor of Trinity Church in York, where he tripled the congregation's contributions and renovated the church building.

== President of Franklin and Marshall ==
In 1909, Apple resigned his position at Trinity Church to serve as president of Franklin and Marshall College. A memorial enacted by the American Philosophical Association records that, during his tenure, the size of the College's student body was tripled and nine new campus buildings were constructed, among other contributions he made. He resigned from the position in 1935. Apple died in Lancaster, Pennsylvania on May 19, 1943, at the age of 73.

=== Honorary Degrees and Awards ===
Apple was awarded an honorary Doctor of Divinity degree from Lafayette College, and was also awarded honorary Doctor of Laws degrees from four institutions, including the University of Pittsburgh and the University of Pennsylvania. He was also awarded the Hungarian Cross of Merit in 1933.
