= Evangelical and Reformed Church =

Protestant Christian denomination in the United States

- Abbreviation: E&R
- Orientation: United Protestant and Reformed
- Polity: Presbyterian
- Origin: 1934
- Merger of: Evangelical Synod and a majority of the Reformed Church in the United States
- Merged into: United Church of Christ
- Defunct: 1957
- Congregations: 2,800 (1953)
- Members: 700,000 (1953)
- Seminaries: Lancaster Theological Seminary; Eden Seminary; Mission House Seminary (later merged into United; Central Seminary (later merged into Eden)

The Evangelical and Reformed Church (E&R) was a Protestant Christian denomination in the United States. It was formed in 1934 by the merger of the Reformed Church in the United States (RCUS) with the Evangelical Synod of North America (ESNA). A minority within the RCUS remained out of the merger in order to continue the name Reformed Church in the United States. In 1957, the Evangelical and Reformed Church merged with the majority of the Congregational Christian Churches (CC) to form the United Church of Christ (UCC).

== History ==
=== Origins ===
Both the Reformed Church and Evangelical Synod originated in the Protestant Reformation in Europe. Nearly all their churches in the United States were established by immigrants from Germany and Switzerland. In 1934, both bodies united to form the Evangelical and Reformed Church.

=== 18th century ===
The Reformed Church in the United States, long known as the German Reformed Church, organized its first synod in 1747 and adopted a constitution in 1793.

The Reformed tradition was and remains centered in Pennsylvania, particularly the eastern and central counties of that state, and extends west to Ohio and Indiana and south to Maryland, Virginia, and North Carolina in the first generation of immigration. Early Reformed adherents settled alongside Lutheran, Schwarzenau Brethren/German Baptists, and sometimes Anabaptist and Mennonite neighbors. Some Reformed congregations in Pennsylvania and North Carolina formed union churches with Lutherans, sharing the same building but operating as separate entities, although they frequently shared Sunday Schools and occasionally ministers.

=== 19th century ===
Up until the early 19th century, Reformed churches ministered to German immigrants with a broadly Calvinist theology and plain liturgy. However, revivals, inspired by Anglo-Saxon Protestant churches during the Great Awakenings of the late 18th and early 19th centuries, influenced the development of the Reformed churches, especially in frontier regions. Some of the more radical practitioners of revivalism and/or pietism defected to Brethren bodies; still others formed the Churches of God, General Conference, a conservative, doctrinally Arminian group.

A backlash set in, however, against revivals in the form of the Mercersburg Theology movement. Named for Mercersburg, Pennsylvania, where the Reformed seminary was located in the mid-19th century, scholarly and ministerial advocates of this position sought to reclaim an older, European sense of the church as a holy society that understood itself as organically related to Christ. This implied a recovery of early Protestant liturgies and a renewed emphasis upon the rite of Holy Communion, somewhat akin to the Tractarian or Anglo-Catholic movement in Anglicanism but within a Reformation vein.

Some leaders, however, saw this platform as an attempt to impose heretical Catholic practice and understandings in a Protestant setting. This group, centered in southeastern Pennsylvania in close proximity to a large Catholic population in Philadelphia and thus motivated by Anti-Catholicism, objected strenuously to the Mercersburg reforms, going so far as to establish a separate seminary now known as Ursinus College. After temporarily causing the Ohio Synod to withdraw from the church, tensions mounted until compromises were worked out and parishes of either low or high church persuasion were allowed to practice their preferences peacefully.

A later group of Germans who had come from the Russian empire, settling in the late 19th century, took root in Wisconsin and spread westward across the Great Plains region; this group spoke German for several generations after the Pennsylvania Dutch had thoroughly Americanized themselves, theologically as well as linguistically. These immigrants did not participate in the Mercersburg/Ursinus struggle; their theological persuasion was decidedly confessionalist, holding to a fairly strict interpretation of the Heidelberg Catechism.

=== 20th century ===
In the 1910s, a small group of immigrant Hungarian Reformed congregations joined the RCUS as a separate judicatory, the Magyar synod. The convictions of some members were so strong that a few churches in that group, most of which were in South Dakota, defected immediately prior to the 1934 merger, influenced by such strict confessionalism, a belief in biblical inerrancy, and a fear of losing their Reformed roots. That group retained the name Reformed Church in the United States.

This schism aside, by the time of the merger talks, the RCUS had mostly joined the American Protestant mainline, sending missionaries overseas and operating health and welfare institutions, including hospitals, orphanages, and nursing homes, throughout much of the United States. Further, the Reformed did some work among Native Americans in Wisconsin. The RCUS' constituency composed slightly over half of the membership of the new denomination in 1934.

=== Evangelical Synod of North America ===
==== 19th century ====
The Evangelical Synod of North America was founded in 1840 at Gravois Settlement in Missouri, by a union of Reformed and Lutheran Christians in a manner similar to the creation of the Prussian Union in the early 19th century. In its early years, this union was known as the German Evangelical Church Association of the West.

The epicenter of the component Evangelical tradition was and remains within the UCC in St. Louis, Missouri, with a heavy concentration of parishes within a 75-mile radius, in Missouri and Illinois. Elsewhere, Evangelicals tended to settle in large cities of the Midwest, including Cincinnati, Louisville, Detroit, Milwaukee, and Chicago. Rural Evangelical strongholds included southwestern Indiana, southern Michigan and Iowa. In the Southern United States, the ESNA was found primarily in central Texas and New Orleans. These concentrations of German settlement also witnessed a large influx of more confessionally-oriented Lutherans, who formed the current-day Lutheran Church–Missouri Synod in opposition to the syncretism they believed the Evangelicals represented. Almost all other of the contemporaneous Germans were Roman Catholic.

Although their faith was chiefly the product of a forced union by the government in Prussia, the Evangelicals by conviction wished to minimize the centuries-old points of contention between Lutheran and Reformed doctrine and practice. This attitude of moderation was enabled in large measure by the rise of pietism, which stressed a more emotional, less rationalistic approach to the teachings of the Bible, thus disinclining scholars and pastors toward technicalities or polemics. Many Evangelical parishes were founded by pastors trained in interdenominational missionary societies such as the St. Chrischona Pilgrim Mission in Basel, Switzerland, in the early 19th century; they immigrated to the United States to assist settlers fleeing Prussian militarism.

Even to a greater degree than the Reformed, the Evangelicals became most noted among American Protestants for their establishment and staunch support of hospitals, orphanages, and homes for the elderly. Probably most similar among English-speaking Protestant groups to the Methodists, pastors emphasized pietist preaching and catechizing young people for the rite of confirmation, a rite still cherished highly to this day by congregations deriving from ESNA roots.

==== 20th century ====
Reflecting a later generation of immigration, the German language persisted for several generations in most congregations before such services were gradually phased out in the era between World War I and World War II, due in part to anti-German sentiment among some Americans.

In 1919, they began missionary efforts in Honduras, establishing what is now called the Evangelical and Reformed Church in Honduras.

In terms of governance, the Evangelicals most resembled American Lutheranism of the time, with high regard for the pastor's authority but essentially congregational in structure, with a lay council handling temporal matters such as property and benevolences.

=== Merger with Congregational Christian Churches ===
In 1957, the Evangelical and Reformed Church joined with the General Council of Congregational Christian Churches to form the UCC. The Rev. James Wagner was the last president of the denomination. Upon the union on June 25 of that year, he became, along with former Congregational Christian general minister Fred Hoskins, a co-president of the UCC. He and Hoskins held these positions until 1961, when the UCC constitution was ratified by the Evangelical and Reformed synods and the requisite percentage of CC congregations. About 40 percent of the members in the new denomination were members of the E&R Church, about 2800 churches and 700,000 members.

== Organization and theology ==
The Evangelical and Reformed Church was generally presbyterian in organization, although it allowed for a great deal of local congregational decision-making than more typical Reformed bodies such as Presbyterianism or the Reformed Church in America did. The church organized into some 30 or so regional synods, culminating in a national General Synod that met annually.

The church used several creeds: the Heidelberg Catechism, Martin Luther's catechisms, and the early Lutheran Augsburg Confession; Evangelical and Reformed leaders allowed great latitude in interpretation. In the main, Evangelical and Reformed congregations emphasized piety and service rather than legalistic soteriology or orthodox dogma. Styles of worship ranged from revivalism (especially in Ohio and North Carolina) to a Lutheran-like liturgicism (the Mercersburg Movement found primarily in central Pennsylvania parishes). Generally speaking, the theological outlook of most ministers was largely accepting of liberal trends in Protestant doctrine and higher biblical criticism, although some pockets of conservative revivalistic pietism and confessionalist Calvinism could be found.

== Educational institutions ==
As with most Protestant denominations, the Evangelical and Reformed church maintained educational institutions and foreign missions. Affiliated educational institutions included the Lancaster Theological Seminary, Franklin and Marshall College, Cedar Crest College, and Ursinus College in Pennsylvania, Elmhurst College in Illinois, Hood College in Maryland, Catawba College in North Carolina, Eden Theological Seminary in Missouri, and Heidelberg College in Ohio.

An Evangelical and Reformed seminary, Mission House, previously located in Sheboygan, Wisconsin, joined with the school of theology of South Dakota's Yankton College, a Congregational Christian institution, to form the United Theological Seminary of the Twin Cities in the early 1960s. The seminary set up operations in New Brighton, Minnesota, outside St. Paul. In the early 1930s Central Seminary in Dayton, Ohio, a previous merger of Ursinus and Heidelberg Seminaries, was merged with Eden Seminary.

In 1946, in cooperation with three other denominations, it formed the United Andean Indian Mission, an agency that sent missionaries to Ecuador.

== Famous members ==
The list includes members of United Church of Christ congregations of Evangelical and Reformed heritage.

- Donald Bloesch
- Walter Brueggemann
- Leon Jaworski
- John Williamson Nevin
- Reinhold Niebuhr
- Richard Niebuhr
- Philip Schaff
- Richard Schweiker
- Bud Shuster
- Paul Tillich
- Friedrich Wilhelm von Steuben
- John Winebrenner
- Victor Paul Wierwille was originally a member before founding The Way International

United States President Theodore Roosevelt attended Washington D.C.'s Grace Reformed Church, an Evangelical and Reformed congregation. Roosevelt originally belonged to the Reformed Church in America (RCA), a Dutch-American group. Since there were no RCA congregations in Washington, he chose Grace Reformed as perhaps the church most similar liturgically and theologically to Dutch Calvinism.
