= David Schley Schaff =

American clergyman and educator (1852–1941)

The Reverend David Schley Schaff
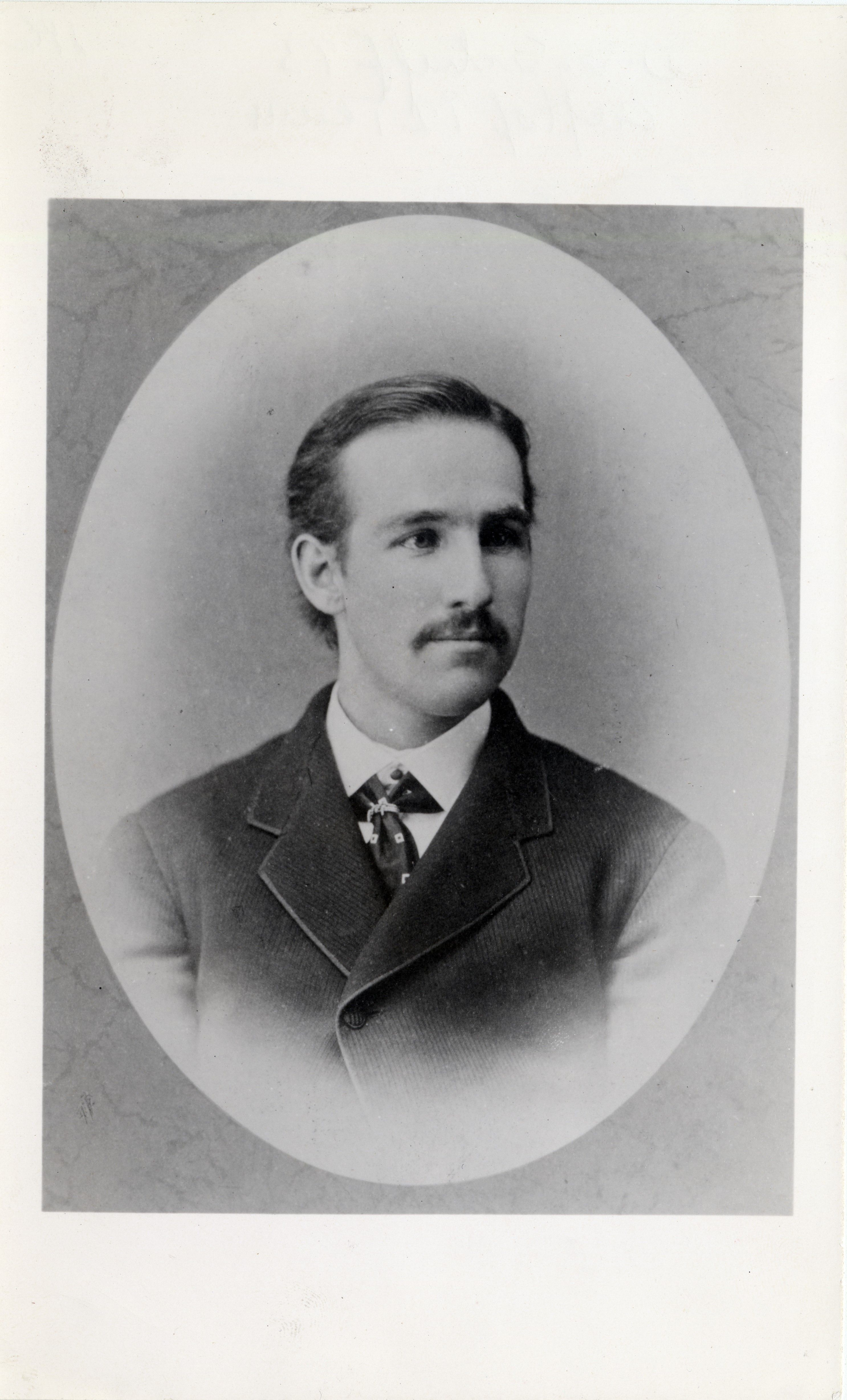
- Born: October 17, 1852; Mercersburg, Pennsylvania, U.S.
- Died: March 2, 1941 (aged 88); Winter Park, Florida, U.S.
- Occupation: Presbyterian minister
- Father: Philip Schaff

David Schley Schaff (October 17, 1852 – March 2, 1941) was an American Presbyterian minister, educator, and pioneer of American football.

== Biography ==
He was the son of theologian and historian Philip Schaff. He prepared for college at Phillips Academy, Andover, the gymnasium at Kornthal, Germany, and at Rugby School in England. Schaff graduated from Yale in 1873 (A.B.) and from Union Theological Seminary in 1876. In 1877, he was ordained in the Presbyterian ministry. He served as a pastor in Hastings, Nebraska from 1877-1881. He then led a congregation in Kansas City, Missouri from 1881 to 1889. After traveling in the Holy Land, Schaff was called to Jacksonville, Illinois where he was a pastor from 1890 to 1897.

He then became Professor of Church History at Lane Theological Seminary in Cincinnati, Ohio until 1903. Schaff then taught church history at Western Theological Seminary, an antecedent of Pittsburgh Theological Seminary, until 1927. Pittsburgh Theological Seminary named an annual lecture after Schaff for his service to the seminary. In 1927, Schaff began a term as Lecturer in American Church History at Union Theological Seminary.

In 1910, Schaff earned a Ph.D. from the University of Geneva in Switzerland. He was a delegate to the Pan-Presbyterian Council at Aberdeen, Scotland in 1913.

Schaff wrote extensively in the area of church history and co-edited the Schaff-Herzog Encyclopedia. He completed the unfinished work of his father, Philip, who had begun the History of the Christian Church before his death. The young Schaff also wrote two books on the life of John Hus.

David Schley Schaff played an early role in the introduction of and development of football in the United States. A graduate of the Rugby School in England, he was familiar with the game of football. In 1872, while a student at Yale, he helped organize and served as the President of the Yale Football Association and was the Captain of Yale's first intercollegiate football team, though he was unable to play in their first game because of injury.

== Works ==
=== Author ===
- Commentary on the Book of Acts (1882)
- Life of Philip Schaff (New York, 1897)
- John Huss (1915)

=== Editor ===
- Schaff-Herzog Encyclopedia (4 vols., 1883)
- History of the Christian Church (Vols. 5-6, 1907–10)(the rest of the work was written by his father Philip Schaff)

=== Translator ===
- John Huss, The Church (1915)
