= Miles O. Noll =

American clergyman, educator, and football coach

Biographical details
- Born: March 30, 1862; Lewisburg, Pennsylvania, U.S.
- Died: November 27, 1905 (aged 43); Carlisle, Pennsylvania, U.S.

Coaching career (HC unless noted)
- 1887: Franklin & Marshall

Head coaching record
- Overall: 0–2

Miles Oscar Noll (March 30, 1862 – November 27, 1905) was an American clergyman, educator, and college football coach.

== Biography ==
Noll was born on March 30, 1862, in Lewisburg, Pennsylvania to Hannah Ritter and John Riem Noll. He attended Franklin & Marshall College and graduated around 1885. He married Katherine Merkle Follmer on June 25, 1891 in Lewisburg, Pennsylvania.

=== Coaching career ===
Noll was the first head football coach at Franklin & Marshall College in Lancaster, Pennsylvania, serving for one season, in 1887 season, and compiling a record of 0–2.

=== Clergy ===
Noll became a pastor and president of the Potomac Synod of the Reformed Church, living in Carlisle, Pennsylvania.

=== Death ===
Noll died from typhoid fever, on November 27, 1905, in Carlisle.

== Head coaching record ==
Year	Team	Overall	Conference	Standing	Bowl/playoffs
Franklin & Marshall (Independent) (1887)
1887	Franklin & Marshall	0–2			
Franklin & Marshall:		0–2			
Total:		0–2			
