= Mercersburg theology =

19th century American theological movement

Mercersburg theology was a German-American theological movement that began in the mid-19th century. It draws its name from Mercersburg, Pennsylvania, home of Marshall College from 1836 until its merger with Franklin College (Lancaster, Pennsylvania) in 1853, and also home to the seminary of the Reformed Church in the United States (RCUS) from 1837 until its relocation to Lancaster in 1871.

== History ==
Although the seminary existed prior to 1844, Mercersburg Theology began in earnest in that year with the hiring of Philip Schaff to join John Williamson Nevin on staff at the seminary. Schaff sparked off controversy with his inaugural address, which was later published as Principle of Protestantism. This led to a series of articles written against Professor Schaff’s view by fellow RCUS pastor Joseph Berg. Several other magazines attacked Schaff and Nevin over their controversial position concerning the relation of the Reformed churches to the Roman Catholic Church. The RCUS was divided on the issue, as the Philadelphia Classis condemned Schaff’s theology, while the East Pennsylvania Classis defended it. The Synod took up the issue in 1845 and cleared Schaff and Principle of Protestantism by a vote of 37 to 3. This marked the only time Schaff was brought before the Synod on heresy charges; the Synod ruled that further complaints had to be registered with the Board of Visitors (trustees) of the Mercersburg Seminary, which never allowed any more complaints to go before the Synod for trial.

The controversy did not end with the clearing of Professor Schaff, however. Professor Nevin published The Mystical Presence, a book about the Lord's Supper, in 1846. Nevin argued for an objective efficacy in the sacrament and that the atonement is brought about by the person of Christ, rather than his work. This brought about many reactions both from inside and outside the church, with the most famous critiques made by Joseph Berg and later by Professor Charles Hodge of Princeton Seminary, the latter a confessional Presbyterian. Spokesmen for both sides in the debate claimed fidelity to, and continuation of, the Reformed tradition. Nevin and Schaff advanced the movement further when they began the Mercersburg Review periodical in 1849. The publication provoked the departure of several prominent RCUS ministers and churches, including Joseph Berg in 1851, as well as the Germantown Reformed Church and its pastor Jacob Helfenstein, and the entire North Carolina Classis, all in 1853.

During the 1850s the RCUS also fought over the use of a liturgy. In general the Mercersburg men favored the new liturgy, which they helped write with Nevin on the committee, and the "Old Reformed Party" (the opponents), rejected it as innovative and as contrary to Reformed doctrine. The controversy, which came perilously close to causing a schism between the factions, continued until 1878, when the General Synod established a peace commission. The General Synod of 1884 approved a liturgy that was approved by the required number of Classes (first-level judicatories, equivalent to presbyteries). The controversy between the two parties ended in a compromise liturgy, and with each side having its own educational institutions: Mercersburg Seminary and Franklin and Marshall College for the Mercersburg Movement, and Ursinus College for the Old Reformed Party.

In 1866 Samuel Miller wrote a defense of Mercersburg theology over and against Modernist theology, which he saw as a threat. He argued that Mercersburg theology assumes certain innate truths which apply to all people at all times in all places, while Modernist theology was rationalistic and depended on empirical and rationalist evidences to rest its foundational beliefs upon, which inevitably leads to infidelity.

By the early 20th century, though, much of the controversy had been rendered moot by three factors. First, the rise of the strongly Protestant neo-orthodox movement among scholars and some RCUS clergy gained ascendence over the romanticism and metaphysics on which Mercersburg was largely based. Second, the resistance to at least modest liturgical innovations by some Old Reformed parishes gradually disappeared under the influence of the ecumenical liturgical movement. Finally, the RCUS' merger with the Evangelical Synod of North America in 1934 brought a significant pietist constituency to the new denomination, as well as a more mediating approach to doctrine, thereby reducing the polemical style of past generations.

The seminary continues to this day (under the name Lancaster Theological Seminary), and its theology and influence still continue today, albeit in moderation, in congregations of the United Church of Christ descended from Reformed congregations which carried out the party's platform.

== Theology ==
John Nevin summarized the Mercersburg Theology, or Movement, by saying, "Its cardinal principle is the fact of the Incarnation." He explained that by adding, "Christ saves the world, not ultimately by what He teaches or by what He does, but by what He is in the constitution of His own person." Nevin's most popular work was The Mystical Presence, a study of the doctrine of the Lord's Supper.

Another significant aspect of the Mercersburg Theology is the view of history and theology found in Philip Schaff's Principle of Protestantism. In this work, Schaff takes a Hegelian model of history and applies it to the history of theology. Theology must come to one final synthesis, as Schaff expressed in his remark that "the Reformation must be regarded as still incomplete. It needs yet its concluding act to unite what has fallen asunder, to bring the subjective to a reconciliation with the objective." By this, he proposes a reunion of the subjective doctrines of Protestantism with the objective character of the Roman Catholic Church. Thus, an outworking of this belief is a generous ecumenism extended toward all, especially toward Roman Catholics. Another contributor to the Hegelian approach of Mercersburg Theology was Friederich Augustus Rauch, especially through his work Psychology.

A more objective liturgy was advocated by both of these founding principles of Mercersburg Theology, and all the major adherents of the movement favored an altar-based liturgy as opposed to pulpit-centered worship, i.e., centered on a lengthy sermon. This included more formal prayers, an altar rather than a table for the Lord's Supper, and a sacramental sensibility. These changes represent a movement in the direction of Lutheranism.

The Mercersburg Society was founded in 1983 to maintain the sacramental and ecclesial approach of the theology. It publishes The New Mercersburg Review and holds an annual summer convocation. In 2012 Wipf and Stock began publishing critical, annotated editions of major works of Schaff, Nevin and their associates in The Mercersburg Theology Study Series. Twelve volumes had been published by 2024.

== Characteristic ==
Most distinctive is the idealist hermeneutic which stood (and stands) in contrast to the common sense realism of Hodge and subsequent American Reformed theology, i.e. Nevin starts with the whole before the parts, and the whole is indeed greater than the sum of the parts. Within this hermeneutical context, Mercersburg also prioritizes the Incarnation as a theological lens which - as one might suppose - has vast theological implications. The result is a thoroughgoing ecclesiology and sacramentology that opposes a number of theological dualisms and heavily forensic soteriologies.

== See also ==
- Philip Schaff
- John Williamson Nevin
- Franklin and Marshall College, located in Lancaster, Pennsylvania.
- Scottish Church Society
