= Evangelical and Reformed Church in Honduras =

The Evangelical and Reformed Church in Honduras is a Reformed denomination established in the first half of the 20th century in the country of Honduras, that holds to the Presbyterian church government.

== History ==
This church was founded by the Evangelical and Reformed Church in the United States. On July 8, 1917 Ramon Guzman Montes in Washington, D.C. showed up the Evangelical Synod of North America to request to send missionaries to Honduras.

- Important footnotes:
  - On May 1. 1921 was the first evangelistic service
  - On Monday 29 held the first Sunday school
  - First baptism in January 1925
  - First Evangelical and Presbyterian Church was organised in August 1926 with 25 members
  - In 1934 the Evangelical and Reformed Church in Honduras was represented in the union of the Reformed Church and the Evangelical Synod in Sion Church, Cleveland.

== Doctrine ==
- Apostles Creed
- Heidelberg Catechism

== Demographics ==
The church has 53 congregations in Honduras.

== Seminary ==
The denomination maintains the Evangelical and Reformed Theological Seminary in San Pedro Sula.
