= John Williamson Nevin =

American theologian (1803 – 1886)

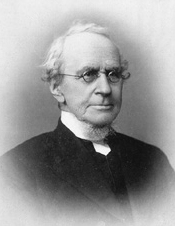

2nd President of Franklin & Marshall College
- In office 1866 – 1876
- Preceded by: Emanuel Vogel Gerhart
- Succeeded by: Thomas Gilmore Apple

2nd President of Marshall College
- In office 1841 – 1853
- Preceded by: Frederick Augustus Rauch
- Succeeded by: Emanuel Vogel Gerhart (as President of Franklin & Marshall College)

Personal details
- Born: February 20, 1803 Strasburg, Pennsylvania
- Died: June 6, 1886 (aged 83) Lancaster, Pennsylvania
- Spouse: Martha Jenkins (m. 1835; died 1886)
- Children: 8, including Blanche Nevin
- Education: Union College (BA); Princeton Theological Seminary (DD)
- Occupation: Minister; Professor

Academic background
- Influences: August Neander; Frederick Augustus Rauch

Academic work
- Discipline: Biblical literature Christian theology
- School or tradition: Mercersburg theology
- Institutions: Western Theological Seminary; German Theological Seminary; Franklin & Marshall College

John Williamson Nevin (February 20, 1803 – June 6, 1886) was an American theologian and educator. He served as the second president of Marshall College after the sudden death of Frederick Augustus Rauch. As president, Nevin negotiated the merger of Marshall College with Franklin College in Lancaster, Pennsylvania to found Franklin & Marshall College in 1853. He later returned to head the combined college as its second president from 1866 to 1876.

Nevin was a leading voice in the Mercersburg theology and established the Mercersburg Review as the mouthpiece for its ideas. Theologically sympathetic with Catholicism, Nevin's association with Franklin & Marshall College and the Lancaster Theological Seminary motivated critics within the German Reformed Church to found Ursinus College as a conservative alternative.

He was the father of noted sculptor and poet Blanche Nevin.

== Early life ==
Nevin was born in Strasburg, Pennsylvania on February 20, 1803 to a Scottish-American family. His uncle was the Founding Father Hugh Williamson.

=== Presbyterian training ===
Nevin was raised Presbyterian and trained to become a Presbyterian minister. He graduated at Union College in 1821 and studied theology at the Presbyterian-affiliated Princeton Theological Seminary from 1823 to 1828. After graduating with his Doctor of Divinity in 1828, Nevin was ordained as a minister by the Carlisle, Pennsylvania Presbyterian church. From 1826 to 1828, Nevin was Charles Hodge's teaching assistant.

In 1830, Nevin was appointed as a professor of biblical literature at the newly founded Presbyterian Western Theological Seminary in Allegheny, Pennsylvania.

== Break with Presbyterianism ==
Under the influence of August Neander, Nevin gradually broke away from "Puritanic Presbyterianism." In 1840, Nevin resigned from the Western Theological Seminary and accepted an appointment as professor of theology in the German Reformed Theological Seminary at Mercersburg. By joining the German Reformed Church's seminary, Nevin abandoned Presbyterianism.

=== Embrace of the Reformed Church ===
As a professor of theology, Nevin quickly rose to prominence. First by his contributions to its organ, the Messenger; then by The Anxious Bench—A Tract for the Times (1843), attacking the vicious excesses of revivalistic methods; and by his defence of the inauguration address, The Principle of Protestantism, delivered by his colleague Philip Schaff, which aroused a storm of protest by its suggestion that Pauline Protestantism was not the last word in the development of the church but that a Johannine Christianity was to be its out-growth, and by its recognition of Petrine Romanism as a stage in ecclesiastical development. To Dr. Schaff's 122 theses of The Principle of Protestantism Nevin added his own theory of the mystical union between Christ and believers, and both Schaff and Nevin were accused of a "Romanizing tendency".

== Conflict with Traditionalists ==
Nevin characterized his critics as pseudo-Protestants, urged (with Dr. Charles Hodge, and against the Presbyterian General Assembly) the validity of Roman Catholic baptism, and defended the doctrine of the "spiritual real presence" of Christ in the Lord's Supper, notably in The Mystical Presence: a Vindication of the Reformed or Calvinistic Doctrine of the Holy Eucharist (1846); to this Charles Hodge replied from the point of view of rationalistic puritanism in the Princeton Review of 1848.

=== Schism and Ursinus College ===
Nevin's pro-Catholic theology alienated traditional elements within the German Reformed Church. To oppose his appointments with Franklin & Marshall College and the German Reformed Theological Seminary, these critics established Ursinus College in 1869 as a conservative alternative.

=== Mercersburg Review ===
In 1849, the Mercersburg Review was founded as the organ of Nevin and "Mercersburg Theology." Nevin was a lifelong contributor, writing for the Review until 1883. In 1851, he resigned from the Mercersburg Seminary to reduce the cost of its payroll.

With Dr. Schaff and others, he was on the committee which prepared the liturgy of the German Reformed Church, which appeared in provisional form in 1857 and as An Order of Worship in 1866.

== Franklin & Marshall College ==
In 1841, Nevin's colleague and Marshall College president Frederick Augustus Rauch died suddenly. Nevin was appointed as Rauch's successor, serving as president of the young college until 1853. Under Nevin, the institution thrived but struggled financially. Nevin and the Franklin College Board of Trustees agreed to merge their institutions in 1853, relocating the college from Mercersburg to Lancaster, Pennsylvania and becoming Franklin & Marshall College.

=== Nevonia ===
From 1861 to 1866, Nevin served the college as an instructor of history. He returned as president in 1866 and served until 1876. Under Nevin's presidency, Franklin & Marshall College was known through the epithet Nevonia.

==== Nevonia legacy ====
This nickname persisted after his departure, giving rise to the college's first athletic nickname, the Nevonians. Franklin & Marshall's traditional school song and fight song is Hail! Hail! Nevonia in honor of Nevin.

Nevin also lent his name to the student newspaper The Nevonian. After Nevin's death, the College inaugurated the Nevonian Medal and Nevonian Society to preserve his legacy and honor individual contributions to the college.

== Personal life ==
Nevin married Martha Jenkins in 1835. They had 8 children, including Blanche Nevin.

He died in Lancaster, Pennsylvania, on June 6, 1886.

== Works ==
Published works: (Note: These works have been republished in modern editions by CrossReach Publications)

- Address on Sacred Music (1827)
- The Scourge of God: A Sermon (1832)
- The Anxious Bench—A Tract for the Times (1843)
- The Mystical Presence: a Vindication of the Reformed or Calvinistic Doctrine of the Holy Eucharist (1846)
- History and Genius of the Heidelberg Catechism (1847)
- A Summary of Biblical Antiquities; For the Use of Schools, Bible-Classes and Families (1849)
- Human Freedom and a Plea for Philosophy: Two Essays (1850)
- Man's True Destiny (1853)
- Life and Character of Frederick Augustus Rauch (1859)
- The Liturgical Question: with Reference To The Provisional Liturgy of the German Reformed Church (1862)
- A Treatise on the Mercersburg Theology; or, Mercersburg and Modern Theology (1866)
- Vindication of the Revised Liturgy, Historical and Theological (1867)

Works in the Mercersburg Theology Study Series: (Note: These volumes are the critical editions of the Mercersburg theology, published by Wipf and Stock, 2012—, and contain, in whole or in part, monographs or essays by Nevin.)

- The Mystical Presence and the Doctrine of the Reformed Church on the Lord’s Supper (v. 1)
- Coena Mystica: Debating Reformed Eucharistic Theology (v. 2)
- The Incarnate Word: Selected Writings on Christology (v. 4)
- Born of Water and the Spirit: Essays on the Sacraments and Christian Formation (v. 6)
- The Development of the Church: “The Principle of Protestantism” and other Historical Writings of Philip Schaff (v. 3)
- One, Holy, Catholic, and Apostolic, Tome 1: Nevin’s Writings on Ecclesiology (1844–1849) (v.5)
- One, Holy, Catholic, and Apostolic, Tome 2: Nevin’s Writings on Ecclesiology (1851–1858) (v. 7)
- The Early Creeds: The Mercersburg Theologians Appropriate the Creedal Heritage (v. 8)
- The Heidelberg Catechism: The Mercersburg Understanding of the German Reformed Tradition (v. 10)
- Philosophy and the Contemporary World: Mercersburg, Culture, and the Church (v. 11)
- Retrieving Catholicity in American Protestantism: Essays in Church History (v. 12)
