= United Theological Seminary of the Twin Cities =

American theological seminary

- Type: Seminary
- Established: 1962
- Religious affiliation: United Church of Christ
- President: Molly T. Marshall
- Dean: Kyle Roberts
- Location: St. Paul, Minnesota, United States
- Website: www.unitedseminary.edu

United Theological Seminary of the Twin Cities (United) is an ecumenical graduate school, historically rooted in the United Church of Christ and located in St. Paul, Minnesota. The school was formed in 1962 with the merger of Mission House Seminary of Plymouth, Wisconsin (the current day Lakeland University), and Yankton School of Theology in Yankton, South Dakota (the defunct Yankton College, now site of the Federal Prison Camp, Yankton). The seminary was located in New Brighton, Minnesota, from its 1962 opening until 2019, when it moved to St. Paul.

Like the UCC itself, United reflects the merging of two denominational backgrounds: Mission House was related to the Evangelical and Reformed Church, while Yankton was one of the numerous schools affiliated with the Congregational Christian Churches. The UCC was formed from the merger of those two bodies, which took place between 1957 and 1961. Despite being formally affiliated with the UCC, the United charter states that the school is ecumenical, independent, and multi-denominational.

United offers the following degrees: Doctor of Ministry (D.Min.), Master of Divinity (M.Div.), Master of Arts in Leadership, and Master of Arts (MA). The school champions social justice, the integration of arts and theology, and interfaith dialogue. United houses the Kaleo Center for Faith, Justice & Social Transformation, a United initiative, and publishes ARTS: The Arts in Religious & Theological Studies, a journal devoted to the study of the arts and theology.

== Bigelow Chapel ==
In 2004, United consecrated the Bigelow Chapel as an addition to the campus. Designed by Joan Soranno and John Cook of Hammel, Green and Abrahamson, Inc., the chapel exhibits floating planes of glass, precast stone walls, and a series of translucent curving wood panels. Two external towers house Deagan chimes.

Bigelow Chapel is the winner of numerous awards for its innovative architecture, including the 2006 Honor Award for Architecture from the American Institute of Architects, and the 2004 Honor Award from the Minnesota Society of the American Institute of Architects.

The new occupant of United's former campus, Global Academy, elected to keep the chapel in its original state, renaming it Bigelow Hall and using it as a secular gathering space.
