= Fred Hoskins =

American clergyman

Fred Hoskins (8 January 1906 – 20 April 1966) was an American clergyman who served as first co-president of United Church of Christ with James Wagner from 1957 to 1961.

== Life and career ==
Hoskins was a graduate of Illinois College before earning a doctorate at Yale Divinity School in 1932. Hoskins served as pastor in Jacksonville, Illinois and at Plymouth Congregational Church in Des Moines, Iowa before succeeding Albert Buckner Coe as minister of First Congregational Church in Oak Park, Illinois in 1950.

He oversaw the merger of Congregational Christian Churches with the Evangelical and Reformed Church into the United Church of Christ in 1961. Hoskins died at Nassau Hospital in Mineola, New York after having a heart attack at his Garden City, New York church office.

The Hoskins Visitorship was established at Yale Divinity School in 1967 in memory of Hoskins, and the Fred Hoskins Christian Influence Award at Illinois College was also named in his honor.
