= James Elvin Wagner =

James Elvin Wagner (1873–1969) was a U.S. clergyman. He was the last president of the Evangelical and Reformed Church and served as the first co-president of the United Church of Christ from 1957 until 1961; his Congregational Christian counterpart was the Rev. Fred Hoskins.

The two churches united officially on June 25, 1957, at a Uniting Synod in Cleveland; the new group represented 2.1 million people in 8,311 churches across the US.
