= Hail! Hail! Nevonia =

Song by John P. Alexander
- Language: English
- Published: 1927
- Genre: School song Fight song
- Songwriter: John P. Alexander

"Hail! Hail! Nevonia" or "Hail, Hail Nevonia" is a traditional school song and fight song of Franklin & Marshall College. First published in 1927, the song was written by Franklin & Marshall student John P. Alexander, class of 1930.

The song references 'Nevonia,' a historical nickname for Franklin & Marshall. Hail! Hail! Nevonia was adopted as the school song in F&M's annual yearbook The Oriflamme from 1931. The song made annual appearances in The Oriflamme and official college events, before gradually falling out of common use.

== Composition ==
The song is in tempo di marcia, reminiscent of a march with 66-80 beats per minute.

Lyrics to Hail! Hail! Nevonia (1927)

== Legacy ==
Alexander rewewed his copyright over Hail! Hail! Nevonia in 1955.

The song makes periodic appearances as an homage to the school's history and tradition. In 1982, The Oriflamme made passing reference to the song as a rhyme in a poem with Old Main. The song was memorialized in John P. Alexander's obituary in the Spring 1982 edition of F&M Today.

=== Contemporary use ===
For the convocation of 2024, incoming freshmen were greeted with "Marching to Nevonia," an original piece loosely based on Hail! Hail! Nevonia.

== See also ==
- Down the Field
