= Karl Daub =

German Protestant theologian (1765–1836)

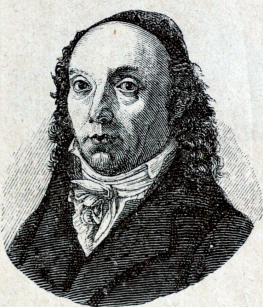
Karl Daub

Karl Daub (German: [ˈkaʁl ˈdaʊp]; 20 March 1765 – 22 November 1836) was a German Protestant theologian.

== Biography ==
He was born in Kassel. He studied philosophy, philology and theology at the University of Marburg in 1786, and eventually (1795) became professor ordinarius of theology at the University of Heidelberg, where he remained until his death. He became rector of the university in 1816 and 1824. He married Sophie Wilhelmine Charlotte Blum in 1801.

Daub was one of the leaders of a school which sought to reconcile theology and philosophy, and to bring about a speculative reconstruction of orthodox dogma. In the course of his intellectual development, he came successively under the influence of Immanuel Kant, Friedrich von Schelling and G. W. F. Hegel, and on account of the different phases through which he passed he was called the Talleyrand of German thought. There was one great defect in his speculative theology: he ignored historical criticism. His purpose was, as Otto Pfleiderer says,

"to connect the metaphysical ideas, which had been arrived at by means of philosophical dialectic, directly with the persons and events of the Gospel narratives, thus raising these above the region of ordinary experience into that of the supernatural, and regarding the most absurd assertions as philosophically justified. Daub had become so hopelessly addicted to this perverse principle that he deduced not only Jesus as the embodiment of the philosophical idea of the union of God and man, but also Judas Iscariot as the embodiment of the idea of a rival god, or Satan."

The three stages in Daub's development are clearly marked in his writings. His Lehrbuch der Katechetik (1801) was written under the spell of Kant. His Theologumena (1806), his Einleitung in das Studium der christlichen Dogmatik (1810), and his Judas Ischarioth (2 vols., 1816, 2nd edition, 1818), were all written in the spirit of Schelling, the last of them reflecting a change in Schelling himself from theosophy to positive philosophy. Daub's Die dogmatische Theologie jetziger Zeit oder die Selbstsucht in der Wissenschaft des Glaubens (1833), and Vorlesungen über die Prolegomena zur Dogmatik (1839), are Hegelian in principle and obscure in language.

He died in Heidelberg.

== Legacy ==
Søren Kierkegaard is notable among those who were prominently influenced by Daub's thought. In From the Papers of One Still Living, Kierkegaard wrote:

There must come a moment, I say, when as Daub observes, life is understood backward through the idea…

Some years later, Kierkegaard expanded on this idea in his journal, in a passage that is often quoted or paraphrased:

Philosophy is perfectly right in saying that life must be understood backwards. But then one forgets the other claim – that it must be lived forwards.
