= Lancaster Theological Seminary =

United Church of Christ seminary in Lancaster, Pennsylvania, US

Coordinates: 40.0456°N 76.3181°W

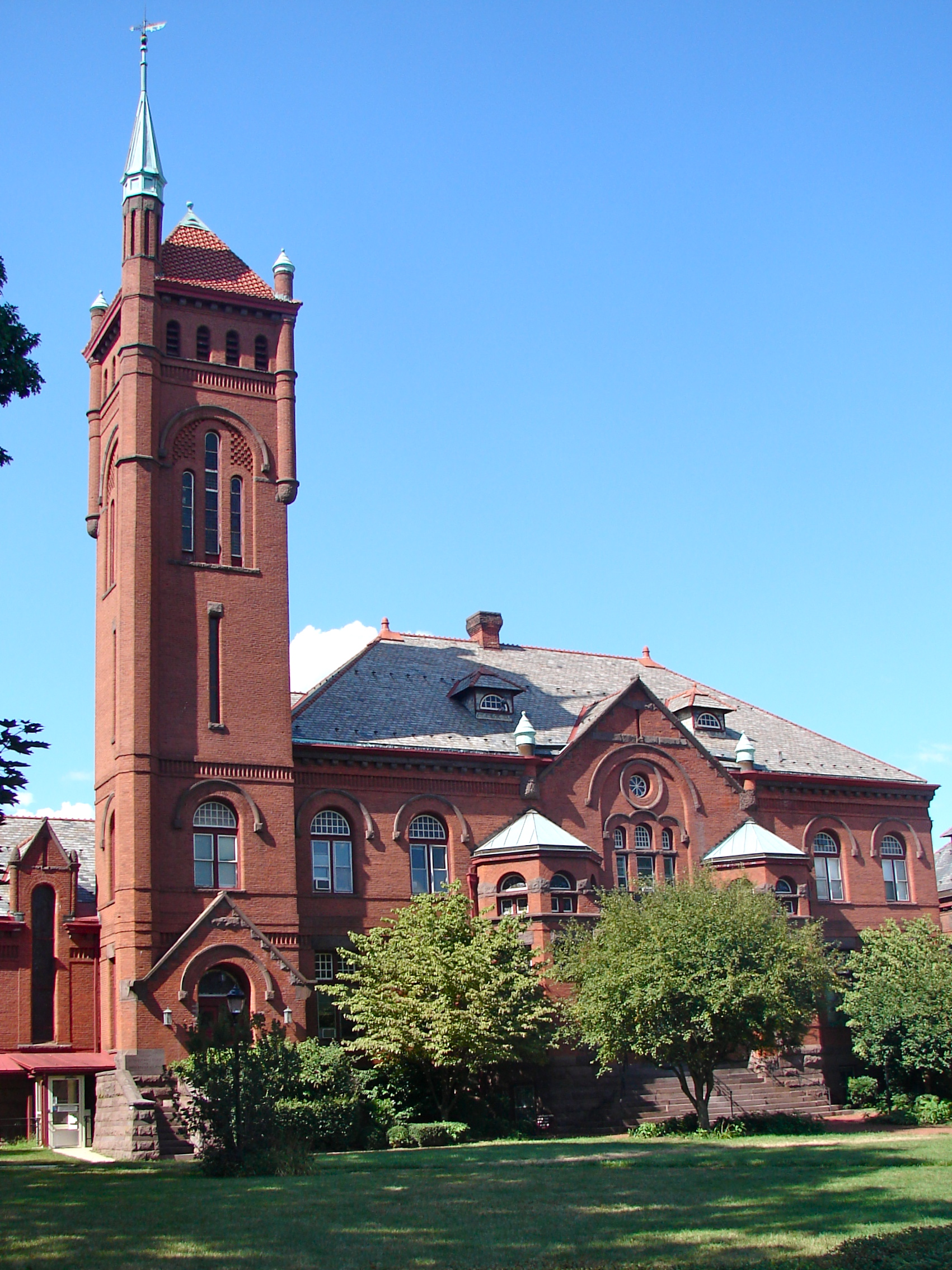
- Lancaster Theological Seminary in August 2011
- Type: Private seminary
- Established: 1825
- Parent institution: Moravian University
- Religious affiliation: Reformed Church in the United States (1825–1934); Evangelical & Reformed Church (1934–1957); United Church of Christ (since 1957)
- Faculty: 6 (full time)
- Students: 48 (2022)
- Location: Lancaster, Pennsylvania, U.S.
- Website: www.moravian.edu/school-theology/about/lancaster-campus

Lancaster Theological Seminary is a seminary of the United Church of Christ in Lancaster, Pennsylvania. Founded in 1825 in Carlisle, Pennsylvania, the seminary was established by the German Reformed Church to provide theological education for prospective clergy and other church leaders.

Moving to Mercersburg, Pennsylvania in 1836, the seminary was the academic craddle of Mercersburg theology under professors Frederick Augustus Rauch, John Williamson Nevin, and Philip Schaff. Condemned as heretical by factions of the Reformed Church, the seminary motivated a conservative schism in the church leading to the establishment of Ursinus College in opposition to the seminary and Franklin & Marshall College.

The seminary moved to Lancaster, Pennsylvania in 1871. It was acquired in 2025 by Moravian University and merged into Moravian's school of theology.

== History ==
=== 19th century ===
After a failed attempt to open the school in Frederick, Maryland, and another in Harrisburg, Pennsylvania, the school opened in Carlisle, Pennsylvania, on the campus of Dickinson College on March 11, 1825, with a class of five students. Later lectures were held in the "old Reformed Church of Carlisle." At this time the seminary struggled financially and due to the fund raising campaign of James Ross Reily (1788–1884) the seminary was able to relocate to York in 1829. Here attendance averaged between 12 and 25 students.

In 1836–37, the seminary moved again to Mercersburg, Pennsylvania under the charter of Marshall College. Here the work of such celebrated professors as John Williamson Nevin, Friederich Augustus Rauch, and Philip Schaff gave rise to the Mercersburg theology, noted for its historic concerns for worship, sacraments, and Church in its ecumenical expressions.

In 1853, Marshall College moved to Lancaster, Pennsylvania, consolidating with Franklin College to form Franklin and Marshall College.

In 1871, the seminary moved to the campus of Franklin and Marshall College in Lancaster. While viewed as a temporary arrangement, the present site of the seminary was not purchased until 1893. The buildings were completed and occupied in 1894.

=== 20th century ===
For most of its history (109 of its 168 years), LTS was the sole seminary of the Reformed Church in the United States (German Reformed Church). With the formation of the Evangelical and Reformed Church in 1934, the seminary became one of three seminaries serving that newly united denomination.

LTS is currently one of seven seminaries holding full relationship with the UCC, a denomination formed in 1957 by the union of the E&R Church and most of the Congregational Christian Churches. Lancaster Theological Seminary is an official Open and affirming seminary.

=== 21st century ===
In 2025, LTS was acquired by Moravian University in Bethlehem, PA and will combine LTS with Moravian Theological Seminary to form the Moravian University School of Theology. The Lancaster campus will continue its affiliation with the United Church of Christ, while the Bethlehem campus will continue its affiliation with the Moravian Church.

== See also ==
- Mercersburg theology
