= Old Main, Goethean Hall, and Diagnothian Hall =

- U.S. National Register of Historic Places
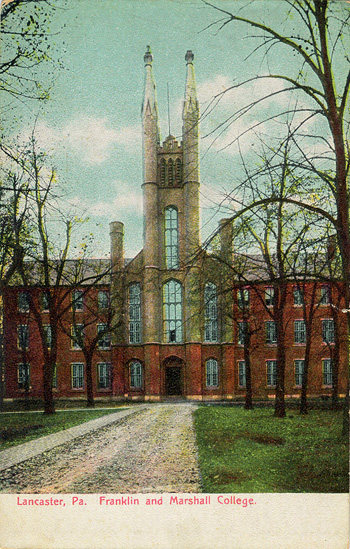
- "Old Main," 1910

- Location within Pennsylvania Location within the United States
- Location: Franklin and Marshall College campus, Lancaster, Pennsylvania
- Coordinates: 40°2′42″N 76°19′14″W
- Area: 2 acres (0.81 ha)
- Built: 1854-1856, 1857
- Architect: Dixon, Balburnie, & Dixon
- Architectural style: Gothic Revival
- NRHP reference No.: 75001645
- Added to NRHP: July 30, 1975

"Old Main," Goethean Hall, and Diagnothian Hall, also known as the Original Buildings of Franklin & Marshall College, are three historic academic buildings that are located on the campus of Franklin & Marshall College in Lancaster, Lancaster County, Pennsylvania.

They were added to the National Register of Historic Places in 1975.

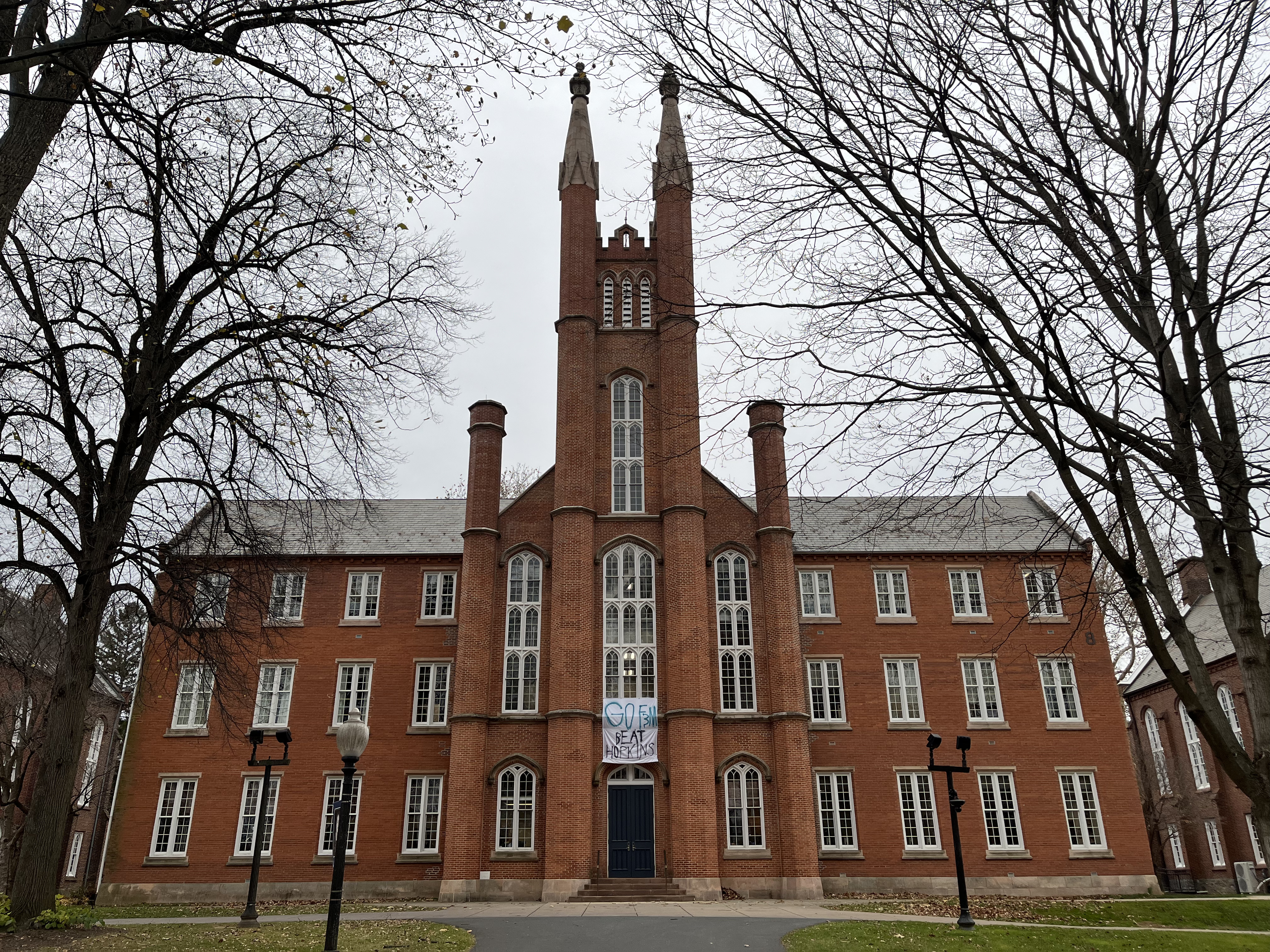
"Go F&M beat Hopkins" across Old Main before a football match

== History and architectural features ==
"Old Main" was built between 1854 and 1856, and is a three-story, T-shaped building with three-story lateral wings. It features a four-story, square entrance tower with five-story octagonal turrets. The chapel was enlarged in 1874. Goethean Hall and Diagnothian Hall flank "Old Main" and were completed in 1857. They are 2 1/2 stories tall, with steeply pitched gable roofs and stepped gables.

The buildings all reflect the Gothic Revival architectural style.

=== Reputation for being haunted ===
During the American Civil War, the buildings served as a military hospital. After the nearby Battle of Gettysburg, many wounded soldiers were treated on campus. The soldiers who died are rumored to haunt the buildings at night, moaning in agony.
