= Franklin & Marshall College =

Private college in Lancaster, Pennsylvania, US

- Coat of arms
- Latin: Collegium Franklinianum et Marshallianum
- Former names: Franklin College (1787–1853); Marshall College (1836–1853)
- Motto: Lux et Lex (Latin)
- Motto in English: Light and Law
- College newspaper: The College Reporter
- Type: Private liberal arts college
- Established: June 6, 1787; 239 years ago (predecessor); June 7, 1853; 173 years ago (combined colleges)
- Religious affiliation: Formerly Reformed Church in the United States
- Academic affiliations: Space-grant; NAICU; Oberlin Group; Annapolis Group
- Endowment: $472 million (2025)
- President: Andrew Rich
- Faculty: 207
- Undergraduates: 1,946
- Location: 415 Harrisburg Ave, Lancaster, Pennsylvania, United States; 40°2′49″N 76°19′14″W
- Campus: 220 acres (89 ha); Suburban
- Colors: (Diplomats blue, light blue)
- Nickname: Diplomats
- Sporting affiliations: NCAA Division III – Centennial Conference NCAA Division I – Eastern Intercollegiate Wrestling Association
- Mascots: Ben and John
- Website: fandm.edu

Franklin & Marshall College (F&M) is a private liberal arts college in Lancaster, Pennsylvania, United States. Founded in 1787 as Franklin College and later merged with Marshall College in 1853, it is one of the oldest colleges in the United States. F&M is named after Benjamin Franklin, who gave the college its first endowment, and John Marshall.

Founded in Lancaster, Pennsylvania, F&M's early years were bilingual, serving the local Pennsylvania Dutch community in German and English. Originally founded as the German College and Charity School, Franklin College received its charter in 1787 from the Pennsylvania General Assembly as a German-language alternative to the University of Pennsylvania. Among its early supporters were Benjamin Franklin, Robert Morris, and Peter Muhlenberg.

Franklin & Marshall College offers 58 fields of study, including the humanities, social sciences, natural sciences, languages, and other disciplines. The college operates an advanced studies program in Bath, England. F&M has students from 43 U.S. states, districts, and territories, as well as students from 50 countries. All students are undergraduates, and nearly all live on campus.

- Franklin and Marshall College Campus Historic District
- U.S. National Register of Historic Places
- U.S. Historic district
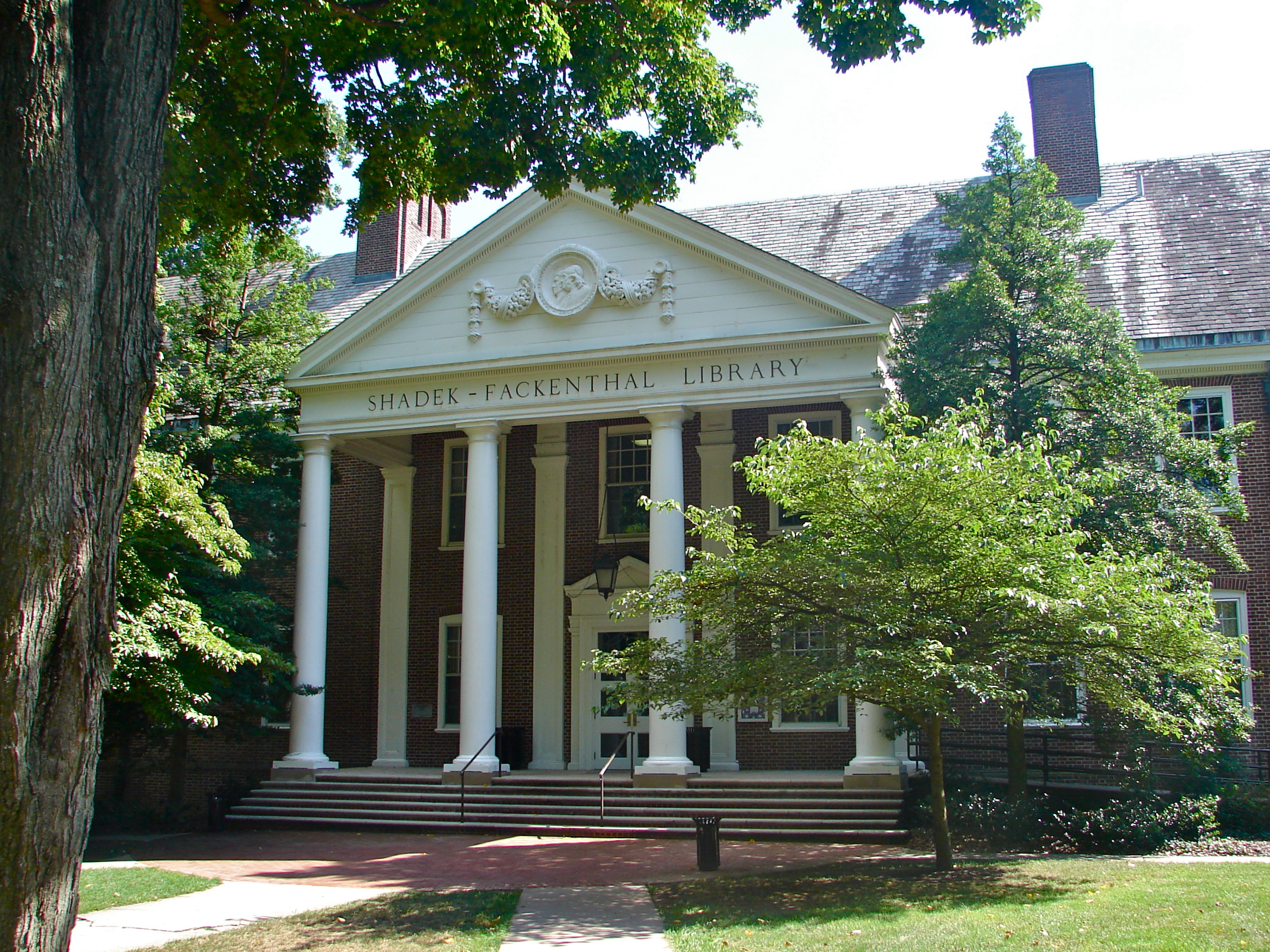
- Shadek-Fackenthal Library (1934-35), the youngest building in the district

- Location within Pennsylvania Location within the United States
- Location: College Avenue, Lancaster, Pennsylvania
- Area: 23 acres (9.3 ha)
- Architect: Dixon, Balbirnie & Dixon; et al.
- Architectural style: Gothic Revival, Tudor Revival
- NRHP reference No.: 03001190
- Added to NRHP: November 21, 2003

== Franklin College (1787-1853) ==
=== Founding years ===
Franklin College was chartered on June 6, 1787, in Lancaster, Pennsylvania, on the site of a former brewery. It was named for Benjamin Franklin, who donated £200 to the new institution. Founded by four prominent ministers from the German Reformed Church and the Lutheran Church, in conjunction with numerous Philadelphians, the school was established as a German college whose goal was "to preserve our present republican system of government" and "to promote those improvements in the arts and sciences which alone render nations respectable, great and happy." Its first trustees included five signers of the Declaration of Independence, two members of the Constitutional Convention, and seven officers of the Revolutionary War.

==== First classes ====
The school's first classes were taught on July 16, 1787, with instruction taking place in both English and German, making it the first bilingual college in the United States.

The first class consisted of 78 men and 36 women; Franklin was the first college in the United States to accept female students. Among its first students was Richea Gratz, the first Jewish female college student in the United States. But soon after, female students were not allowed to matriculate. Coeducation was reintroduced much later.

=== Struggles ===
In July 1789, Franklin College went into debt and enrollment dwindled. In an effort to help the ailing school, an academy was established in 1807. For the next three decades, Franklin College and Franklin Academy limped along financially, with instructors supplementing their income with private tutoring.

== Marshall College (1836-1853) ==
=== Founding ===
Having grown from a Reformed Church academy, Marshall College opened in 1836 in Mercersburg, Pennsylvania. The school was named for the Chief Justice of the United States John Marshall, who had died the previous year. It was founded with the belief that harmony between knowledge and will was necessary to create a well-rounded person.

Upon opening, Marshall College had five students, which expanded to ten in the first year. After significant difficulty in finding a proper academic to lead the nascent college, Frederick Augustus Rauch was installed as Marshall College's first president. Rauch was a recent immigrant to Pennsylvania from Germany, arriving in 1831 and teaching briefly at Lafayette College before being selected as Marshall College's president. Critics mocked Rauch for speaking little English.

=== Early years ===
The school's small faculty grew in both size and status with the addition of John Williamson Nevin and another German scholar, church historian Philip Schaff. Frederick Augustus Rauch died suddenly in 1841, five years after becoming the college's founding president. Professor Nevin became the college's second president upon Rauch's sudden death in 1841.

==== 1837 abolitionism riot ====
In July 1837, a riot erupted in Mercersburg over abolitionism and slavery. The travelling abolitionist Jonathan Blanchard visited the town, but was unable to find a public venue and refused accommodations at the local hotel. He spent the night at a boarding house run by the family of a Marshall College student, Daniel Kroh and on his way to church the next morning was attacked by a mob largely composed of Southern students. After being rescued by another Marshall student and a local war veteran, he returned to Kroh's house and delivered his speech to a private audience. The next morning, he escaped in a closed carriage as the Southern students threw stones and cursed at him. The college investigated Kroh for disturbing the peace and reprimanded him for refusing to cooperate with their investigation, but they also expelled at least one rioter.

In 1840, President Rauch published Psychology; or, A View of the Human Soul, the first book in America on psychology.

=== Popularity and financial struggles ===
Marshall College gained national recognition and attracted students from a large geographical area, with some coming as far away as the West Indies. However, despite being initially well-funded, Marshall College began to experience financial difficulties of its own. By the late 1840s, financial support and enthusiasm among the local community had virtually disappeared and the school was in danger of closing its doors permanently.

In 1835, the school's debating society was renamed Diagnothian Literary Society. A further debate society was named Goethean, in honor of German philosopher and poet Johann Wolfgang von Goethe. The two organizations merged in 1955, but became separate entities again in 1989. The Diagnothian Society is said to be the oldest student organization on campus.

=== Merger ===
On December 6, 1849, Franklin College and Marshall College began to consider merging as a way to secure the future of both institutions. Three years later, on June 7, 1853, the combined college was formally dedicated at Lancaster's Fulton Hall. The merger created an all-male Reformed Church institution that combined the resources of both schools. James Buchanan, four years prior to becoming the 15th President of the United States, was named president of the first Franklin & Marshall board of trustees.

The college's first two presidents, Emanuel Vogel Gerhart, a Marshall College graduate, and Nevin struggled to keep the young school afloat with an inadequate endowment. The hope of creating a reputable liberal arts institution fueled their efforts to push on. "No second- or third-rate school will do," said Nevin at the formal dedication of the united college. "We must either have no college at all or else have one that may be in all respects worthy of the name."

The citizens of Lancaster agreed to donate $25,000 towards the construction of a building for the merged college. A site on the east end of the city was proposed near where the new Lancaster County Prison was constructed in 1851. Two parallel streets in the area were renamed, one for Franklin and one for Marshall. However, Buchanan ultimately rejected the proposal, saying "I do not think the best location for a literary institution should be between a court house and a jail." Instead, Buchanan and the board selected a site at the northwestern end of Lancaster. Known locally as "Gallows Hill," it was the former site of Lancaster's public executions and the highest point of ground in the city. At the laying of the building's cornerstone in 1853, Henry Harbaugh, a Marshall College graduate and pastor of the Reformed Church of Lancaster noted that the city's lowest point was the prison. Harbaugh stated: "Thank God! The College stands higher than the jail. Education should be lifted up and let crime sink to the lowest depths!" The distinctive, tall-towered structure, designed in the Gothic Revival style, was dedicated on May 16, 1856, as "Recitation Hall." Recitation Hall came to be known as "Old Main" and the ground as "College Hill".

Franklin and Marshall College took as its motto the Latin phrase Lux et Lex, which translates in English to "Light and Law". This reversed the Marshall College motto Lex et Lux. While legend has it that the switch was the result of an error by an engraver, it has since been suggested that the words deliberately reflect its namesakes Benjamin Franklin ("light") and John Marshall ("law").

The college seal depicts profiles of Franklin and Marshall looking to the left. It has been suggested that this represents the two leaders looking westward to the future expansion of the United States. Despite his nominal secondary priority, John Marshall is on the left of the seal and Benjamin Franklin is on the right. But Franklin's entire head is shown, while Marshall's profile is cut off and far in the background. Speculation has suggested that this demonstrates an unspoken tendency to favor Franklin's legacy over Marshall's. This preference became explicit when the school celebrated Benjamin Franklin's 300th birthday but ignored John Marshall's 250th birthday during consecutive semesters of the 2005–2006 academic year. The school recognized Marshall's milestone birthday only after a petition was signed by a significant portion of students and faculty.

Old Main, Goethean Hall, and Diagnothian Hall were added to the National Register of Historic Places in 1975.

== "Nevonia" period ==
Under the presidency of John Williamson Nevin, the combined institution was known through the byname Nevonia. The Nevonia period stretched from the late 19th century through the early 20th century. During this period, Franklin & Marshall developed a strong student culture centered around sports and fraternities. Franklin & Marshall football began in 1886 under the "Nevonians" nickname, with future college president Henry Harbaugh Apple on the inaugural team.

=== Student newspapers ===
During this time, the first college newspaper opened on campus in 1873, College Days, followed by The College Student in 1881 and The Student Weekly in 1891. The Oriflamme, the Franklin and Marshall College yearbook, was established in 1883. These papers captured the raucous student life of the Nevonia period, with The Student Weekly proclaiming that any student absent from football games was "a plain, ordinary slacker and you don't belong here."

In 1887, the centennial celebration of Franklin College was held. By then, over 100 students were enrolled at F&M.

=== Franklin & Marshall Academy ===
In 1872, Franklin & Marshall Academy, an all-male preparatory school, opened on campus. When it closed in 1943, it was the last prep school in America to be directly affiliated with a private college or university.

=== Decline of the Nevonia period: 20th century ===
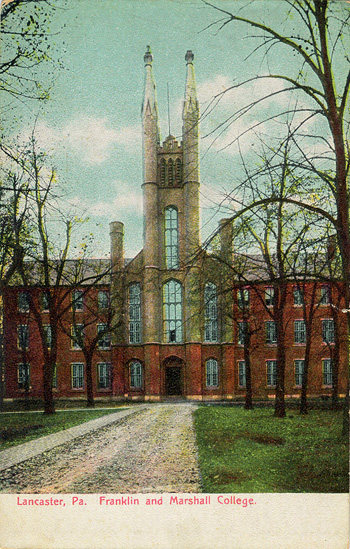
Old Main, Franklin & Marshall College, c. 1910

The college grew rapidly after the end of World War I. Enrollment rose from around 300 students in 1920, to over 750 by 1930. In 1924, the architectural firm of Klauder and Day presented a master campus plan in the Colonial Revival style. Dietz-Santee dormitory, Meyran-Franklin dormitory, the Mayser Physical Education Center, and Hensel Hall were all completed within three years. Two additional dormitories were planned, but never constructed.

In 1927, student John P. Alexander composed Franklin & Marshall's traditional school song, "Hail! Hail! Nevonia."

The sesquicentennial celebration of Franklin College was held in October 1937. Student enrollment by then was 800. A commemorative plaque celebrating the sesquicentennial and the signing of the United States Constitution was presented to the college by the Lancaster County Historical Society.

In 1939, the school began an aviation program in the new Keiper Liberal Arts Building. The Aeronautical Laboratory eventually became a government-sponsored flight school with 40 faculty members. Two airplanes were disassembled, moved into the building and reassembled on the third floor as flight simulators.

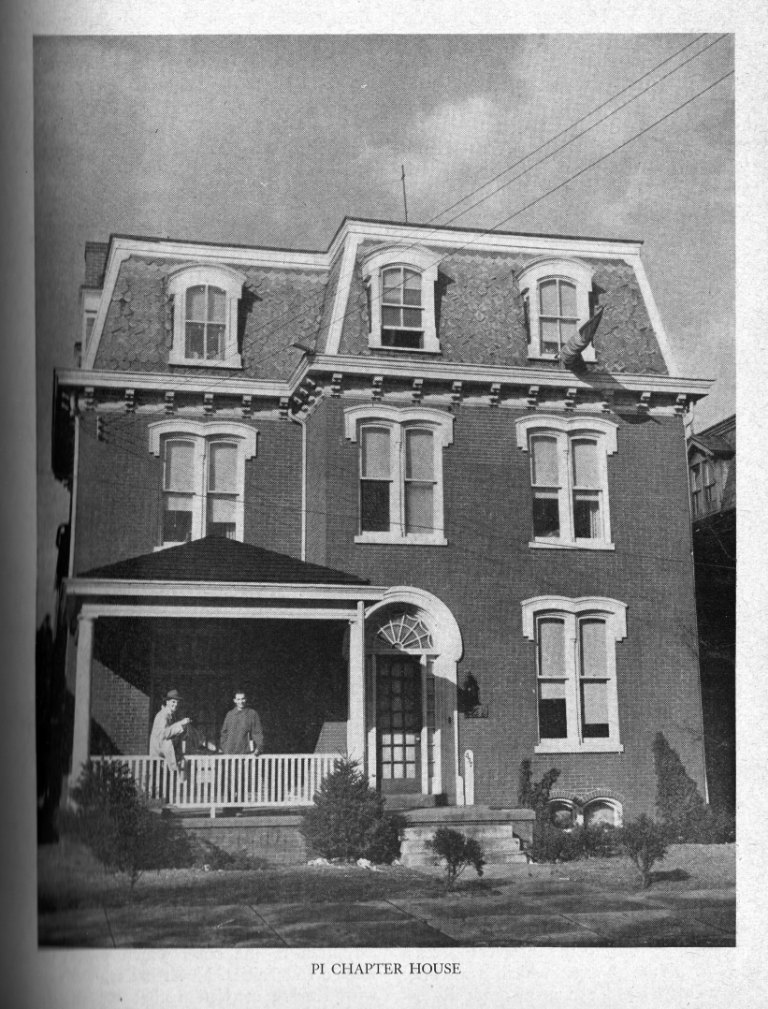
Pi Chapter House, 1943

During World War II, Franklin and Marshall College was one of 131 colleges and universities that adopted the V-12 Navy College Training Program offering students a path to a Navy commission.

By 1945, with most young men in the armed services, the college population dwindled to just under 500 students and 28 faculty members. The end of the war brought an influx of students pursuing degrees under the G.I. Bill. By 1946, enrollment had swelled to over 1,200 students (including four women in the pre-med program), causing a sudden critical shortage of faculty. The 1950s and 1960s brought more college expansion and construction, including North Museum (1953); Marshall-Buchanan Residence Hall (1956), Appel Infirmary (1959), Schnader Residence Hall (1959), Mayser Physical Education Center (1962), Benjamin Franklin Residence Halls (1964), Pfeiffer Science Complex (now Hackman Physical Science Laboratory) (1967), Grundy Observatory (1967), Whitely Psychology Laboratory (1968), and Thomas Residence Hall (1968).

Like other academic institutions in the 1960s, Franklin and Marshall endured student protests during the Civil Rights Movement and the Vietnam War. In April 1961, students rioted in front of the President's house and Hensel Hall, burning effigies and college property in protest of administration policies.

Martin Luther King Jr. visited the campus on December 12, 1963, three weeks after the assassination of John F. Kennedy, and spoke on civil rights to an overflow crowd of more than 4,000 in Mayser Center, the school's gymnasium.

In 1965 Robert Mezey, a 30-year-old visiting English instructor and poet, spoke on campus against the Vietnam War, and traveled to Washington, DC to march against the conflict. When he was accused of urging students to burn their draft cards, he was suspended with pay for a month while the college investigated. The incident generated controversy in the local press, with some residents ordering him to "get the hell out of Lancaster" and "go to Russia." Though Mezey was reinstated, he left the college the following spring. This became known as the "Mezey Affair."

In the spring of 1969, black students protested the final examination of the history course "The Black Experience in America." Demanding an apology from the faculty for exploitation and an "A" in the course, the students argued that no white man can test them on their "blackness." The day before the exam, the professors agreed to the apology, but insisted that the students take the final exam. On May 22, the day of the exam, 40 black students—many of whom were not enrolled in the course—blocked the entrance to the exam room in Old Main. The professors attempted to hand out the exam, but the protesters confiscated them. Retreating to Goethean Hall next door, the professors and staff met to evaluate the situation. The protesters followed them to the building, blocked all doors and exits and held them hostage, declaring that they would not release the faculty members until they received an apology and immunity from punishment. The standoff lasted until midnight, when the professors agreed to allow the students to grade themselves. The students relented and released the hostages. The college's Professional Standards Committee later overturned the decision, declaring that the professors must grade their students.

In 1969, Franklin and Marshall College ended its formal affiliation with the United Church of Christ, becoming a secular school. Franklin College had enrolled female students during its first few years in the eighteenth century, to its academy for teenagers. Franklin and Marshall College was an all-male institution. Women were permitted to attend summer school classes at F&M beginning in 1942. Continuing a trend at gender exclusive schools across the country, the Board of Trustees announced on January 17, 1969, that it had voted to admit women to F&M, a decision that was supported by male students. In the fall of 1969, 82 freshman women and 34 female transfer students were enrolled in F&M's first coeducational class.

In 1970, F&M students protested the administration's failure to rehire popular sociology instructor Anthony Lazroe and history instructor Henry Mayer. The protest, known as the "Lazroe-Mayer incident," culminated in an East Hall sit-in on April 30, where students took over the building for several hours.

On September 17, 1970, the Herman Art Center (named after Jacob Leon Herman, Class of 1916) was dedicated as part of Convocation, during which painter Jim Dine and sculptor Chaim Gross were awarded honorary degrees. The building was designed by Fisher, Nes and Campbell of Baltimore, MD, for the studio art program, but only half of the original design was constructed due to lack of funds.

In 1976, the Steinman College Center was constructed. The building—designed by Minoru Yamasaki, architect of New York's World Trade Center—originally housed the campus bookstore. Today it houses the College Reporter, the Oriflamme Yearbook, the College Entertainment Committee, the Phillips Museum of Art, Pandini's (a restaurant), the campus radio station WFNM, and a post office.

On April 29, 1976, the Green Room Theatre staged the world premiere of the John Updike play Buchanan Dying, about former President James Buchanan, a Lancaster resident and former president of the board of trustees. The production was directed by Edward S. Brubaker and starred Peter Vogt, an F&M alumnus. After the premiere, a reception was held at Wheatland, Buchanan's Lancaster residence.

On March 28, 1979, the Three Mile Island nuclear reactor in nearby Harrisburg, Pennsylvania, experienced a partial meltdown, forcing the college to close briefly.

The college prospered during the 1980s. Construction projects initiated during the decade included Hartman Green (1982), French House (1984), Murray Arts House (1984), Ice Rink (1984), Spaulding Plaza (1985), and the Other Room Theatre (1985). Major renovations and expansions included Fackenthal Library (1983, renamed Shadek-Fackenthal Library, currently over 510,000 volumes), Stahr Hall (1985, renamed Stager Hall, 1988), the Black Cultural Center (1986), and Weis Residence Hall (1989). On June 6, 1987, Franklin and Marshall College celebrated its bicentennial.

The 1990s brought a major expansion to the north side of campus with the construction of College Square in 1991. The multi-use complex houses a bookstore, laundromat, video store, restaurants and a food court. Other buildings from the decade include International House (1990), Martin Library of the Sciences (1990, currently over 61,000 volumes), and the Alumni Sports and Fitness Center (1995).

=== 21st century ===
At the start of the 21st century, the college continued to grow with the addition of several new buildings. In 2003, the National Park Service established the Franklin and Marshall College Campus Historic District, listing 14 buildings (including Old Main, Goethean Hall, and Diagnothian Hall, previously listed in 1975) and three architectural features. That same year the college built a new theatre on campus, the Roschel Performing Arts Center.

On January 19, 2006, the college celebrated the tricentennial of Benjamin Franklin's birth. Franklin scholar Walter Isaacson gave a lecture, and a full-page ad praising Franklin and promoting the college was purchased in The New York Times.

On March 10, 2010, it was announced that then current president John Fry would be leaving the college to become the president of Drexel University on August 1, 2010. The college immediately began a search for a new president for the fall semester. Alumnus John Burness took a one-year leave from his job at Duke University as senior vice president for public affairs and government relations to head the college as interim president.

On November 16, 2010, Daniel R. Porterfield was announced as the new president, effective March 1, 2011. Porterfield came to F&M from Georgetown University in Washington, D.C., where he served as a senior vice president. He became the 15th president in the college's history.

Since 2011 hundreds of talented, underserved high school students from across the country have taken part in F&M College Prep, a summer immersion program that offers an introduction to college life. Each of these participants have gone on to college, and more than 90% have gone on to enroll at four-year colleges, including Harvard, Brown, Stanford, Georgetown, and Bucknell universities, the University of Texas-Austin, Pomona College, Trinity College, Spelman College, and Franklin & Marshall. The Office of Student and Post-Graduate Development offering life skills workshops, job-search boot camps for seniors and recent grads, on-campus recruiting and alumni programming, opened in 2012 and enjoys wide support from students and alumni. The Andrew W. Mellon Foundation awarded F&M a $700,000 grant for its Faculty Center, which was launched in 2013 to improve support for faculty in their roles as researchers and educators.

On May 1, 2014, Franklin & Marshall College was named as one of 55 colleges under review or investigation by the U.S. Department of Education's Office for Civil Rights, for their policies or practices for handling sexual assault reports. Prior to the public announcement, President Porterfield sent an email to address the impending OCR "fact-finding investigation."

=== Presidents ===
Franklin College

- Gotthilf Heinrich Ernst Muhlenberg (1787–1815)
- Operated by Board of Trustees (1816–1853)

Marshall College

- Frederick Augustus Rauch (1836–1841)
- John Williamson Nevin (1841–1853)

Franklin and Marshall College

- Emanuel Vogel Gerhart '38 (1854–1866)
- John Williamson Nevin (1866–1876)
- Thomas Gilmore Apple '50 (1877–1889)
- John Summers Stahr '67 (1889–1909)
- Henry Harbaugh Apple '89 (1910–1935)
- John Ahlum Schaeffer '04 (1935–1941)
- H. M. J. Klein '93 (1941) (acting president)
- Theodore August Distler (1941–1954)
- William Webster Hall (1955–1957)
- Frederick deWolf Bolman, Jr. (1957–1962)
- Anthony R. Appel '35 (1962) (resigned after one week)
- G. Wayne Glick (1962) (acting president)
- Keith Spalding (1963–1983)
- James Lawrence Powell (1983–1988)
- A. Richard Kneedler '65 (1988–2002)
- John Anderson Fry (2002–2010)
- John Burness '67 (2010–2011) (interim president)
- Daniel R. Porterfield (2011–2018)
- Barbara K. Altmann (2018–2025)
- Andrew Rich (2025– )

== Academics ==
Franklin & Marshall confers Bachelor of Arts (B.A.) degrees in 58 undergraduate fields. The college's approach in liberal arts expands over a myriad of fields, such as natural sciences, arts, and humanities. Besides the traditional academic disciplines, the college offers a variety of options to students to enrich their learning experiences, such as interdisciplinary majors, joint and special studies majors, and certificates. F&M also provides interdepartmental programs between chemistry, biology, psychology, and philosophy departments. The majors from these programs include: Biochemistry and Molecular Biology, Biological Foundations of Behavior: Neuroscience and Animal Behavior, and Scientific and Philosophical Studies of the Mind: Cognitive Science and Moral Psychology. In 2022, according to the U.S. Department of Education, F&M's most popular majors are:

- Business, Organizations & Society (58)
- Economics (36)
- Government (36)
- Behavioral Sciences and Psychology (36)
- Public Health (33)
- Mathematics (28)
- Biology (21)
- Biochemistry and Molecular Biology (15)
- Neuroscience (14)

=== Academic partnerships ===
F&M students with a major in Business, Organizations and Society (BOS), or a relevant coursework can apply to earn a Master of Human Resource Management (MHRM) from Rutgers University. Additionally, regardless of their major, F&M students can earn a Master of Science in Accounting from one of F&M's partner, dual degree institutions: Wake Forest University, Vanderbilt University, and New York University.

F&M offers 3+2 or 4+2 dual degree programs with partner institutions that allow students to earn a Bachelor of Arts from Franklin & Marshall College and a Bachelor of Science degree from one of the four partner institutions: Case School of Engineering, Columbia University's Fu Foundation School of Engineering and Applied Science, Rensselaer Polytechnic Institute’s School of Engineering, and Washington University's McKelvey School of Engineering.

The college offers a program with Duke University in graduate-level environmental science and management, forestry, and policy, allowing students to earn both degrees in five years—three at Franklin & Marshall and two at Nicholas School of the Environment at Duke University.

Recent graduates who are interested in long-term teaching in Philadelphia area can apply to the Franklin Fellowship, a partnership between Franklin & Marshall and the University of Pennsylvania Graduate School of Education. A scholarship between two Benjamin Franklin schools, this is a exclusive merit-based award for the F&M graduates applying to Penn GSE's Urban Teaching Residency (UTR) program.

=== Reputation and rankings ===
Academic rankings

Liberal arts
- U.S. News & World Report: 31
- Washington Monthly: 21

National
- Forbes: 101
- WSJ/College Pulse: 84

In the U.S. News & World Report annual college rankings for 2024-2025, Franklin and Marshall College tied for 31st in National Liberal Arts Colleges, 23rd in Best Undergraduate Teaching, 25th in Top Performers on Social Mobility, and 42nd in Best Value Schools. In the similar Forbes rankings, Franklin and Marshall ranked 101st in overall top colleges, 57th in private colleges, 24th in Liberal Arts Universities, and 43rd in the Northeast. Washington Monthly ranked Franklin and Marshall 21st in their list of Liberal Arts Colleges.

=== Admissions ===
Franklin and Marshall's admissions process is rated as "more selective" by U.S. News & World Report. The acceptance rate for the Class of 2028 was 26%.

== Campus ==
Franklin & Marshall is situated in Lancaster, a historic city with deep Pennsylvania Dutch and German-American roots. Located in the northwest corner of the city, the college's campus primarily spans Lancaster City and parts of Manheim Township. The overall architectural design of F&M can be traced through a blend of Gothic Revival, Federal Revival, and modernist influences, reflecting the evolution of the institution over nearly two centuries. Franklin & Marshall College’s Old Main, Goethean Hall, and Diagnothian Hall are listed on the National Register of Historic Places for their Gothic Revival architecture and historical significance as the core of the college's 19th-century campus.

== Student life ==
There are over 110 clubs and organizations at Franklin & Marshall.

=== The College Reporter ===
The College Reporter (TCR) is a weekly, student-run news publication at Franklin & Marshall College. TCR continues a long tradition of student journalism at F&M that began in 1875 with the publication of College Days.

=== Green Room Theatre club ===
1899 saw the formation of the college's first theatre group, the Franklin & Marshall Dramatic Association. The next year, it was renamed the Green Room Club. The club performed plays at Lancaster's Fulton Opera House. Because the college admitted only men, the female roles were played by local actresses. In 1937, the Green Room Theatre opened on campus.

Franklin & Marshall alumni who have performed on the Green Room stage include Oscar-winning film director Franklin J. Schaffner and actors Roy Scheider and Treat Williams.

=== Greek system ===
Since the merger in 1853, Greek life on F&M's campus have become an integral part of the college's history, leadership, and philanthropy. In April 1988, the college's board of trustees voted to no longer officially recognize the school's fraternities and sororities. At the time, three of the school's fraternities had recently lost their national charters due to various offenses. In an effort to repair the system, the college administration proposed eight specific reforms to the Greek Council, which were ultimately rejected by all of the organizations. The loss of recognition was unpopular with some students. The Greek system continued, albeit without financial or administrative support from the college. After several years of irregularities and health risks, the college announced in 2004 that it would reinstate a revised Greek system after a 16-year absence.

The college has a total of 11 formally recognized Greek life chapters, including seven sororities, five fraternities, and 1 co-ed honors fraternity. Greek life continues to be a major part of F&M's community, while the college continues its revised structure of administrative support. As of the spring of 2014, internal sources claimed that 43.7% of the F&M student body were members of Greek houses. The Zeta chapter of Phi Kappa Sigma at Franklin & Marshall is the fraternity's oldest active chapter worldwide and the first fraternity on F&M’s campus.

== Athletics ==
Franklin & Marshall's sports teams are called the Diplomats, which compete in the Centennial Conference of the NCAA Division III. The Diplomats are founding members of the Centennial Conference, which is headquartered on Franklin & Marshall's campus and was founded by F&M president Keith Spalding on June 4, 1981. The Diplomats have won 138 conference titles and 4 national titles.

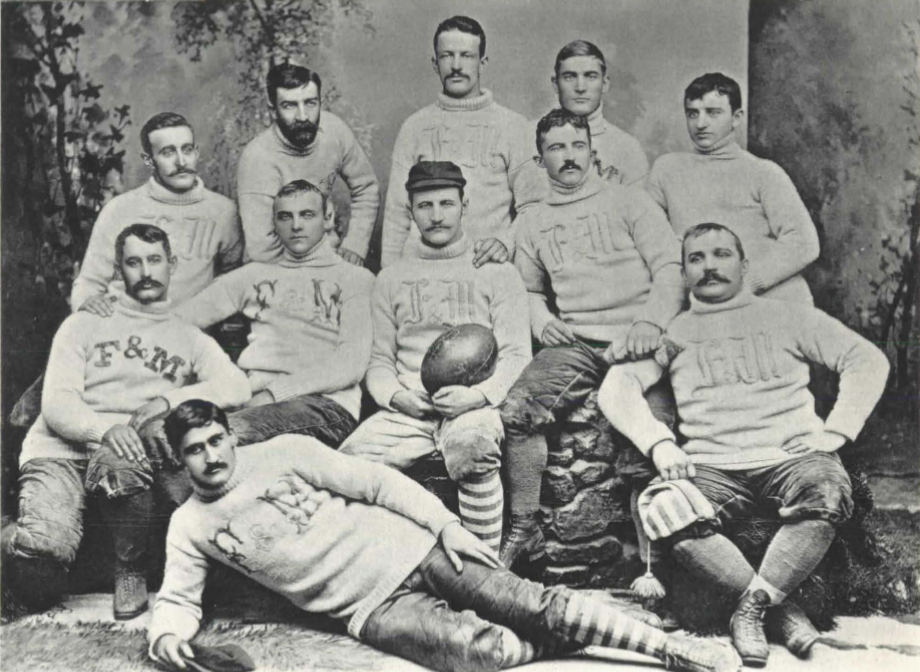
1890 Franklin and Marshall Nevonians football team

=== History ===
Historically known as the Nevonians, football was the first sport played at Franklin & Marshall. Intercollegiate sports began at Franklin & Marshall in 1886 with the founding of the short-lived Inter-state Athletic Association.

"Hail! Hail! Nevonia" was written by John P. Alexander '30 as a football cheer song, quickly becoming an official school song.

==== Wrestling ====
In men's wrestling, the Diplomats compete in NCAA Division I as members of the Eastern Intercollegiate Wrestling Association.

Soccer

The men's soccer team was the first Diplomats athletic squad to win a national title. In 1952, the Intercollegiate Soccer Football Association awarded the overall national title to the team.

== Clothing company ==
In 1999, a company based in Verona, Italy, began producing items of clothing in a vintage 1950s collegiate-style with the words "Franklin and Marshall" on them. F&M alumni began to report seeing F&M merchandise for sale in Europe, which puzzled the college.

In 2001, Tim McGraw posed for publicity photos wearing a "Franklin Marshall Wrestling" T-shirt, one of which was included in the CD booklet for his album Set This Circus Down. When many asked Franklin & Marshall College about its nonexistent connection to the singer, the college investigated and discovered that the Franklin Marshall Clothing company was using its name without permission. In 2003, the college licensed the name to the company so it could sell its products, many of which omit Franklin & Marshall's ampersand, in the United States.

The clothing company has stated in news reports that its designs are "inspired by the American Vintage College spirit, as exemplified by Franklin & Marshall College." Most of its products are made in Italy and are much more expensive than the Champion-produced licensed apparel sold by the college's bookstore. As of 2011 the company has stores in six cities: Athens, Dubai, Milan, Tokyo, and Paris, and also sells through high-end stores like Harrods in Britain. Although it no longer sells its products in the United States due to poor sales, in 2010 the company pledged to donate $130,000 to the college's scholarship fund.

== Gallery ==
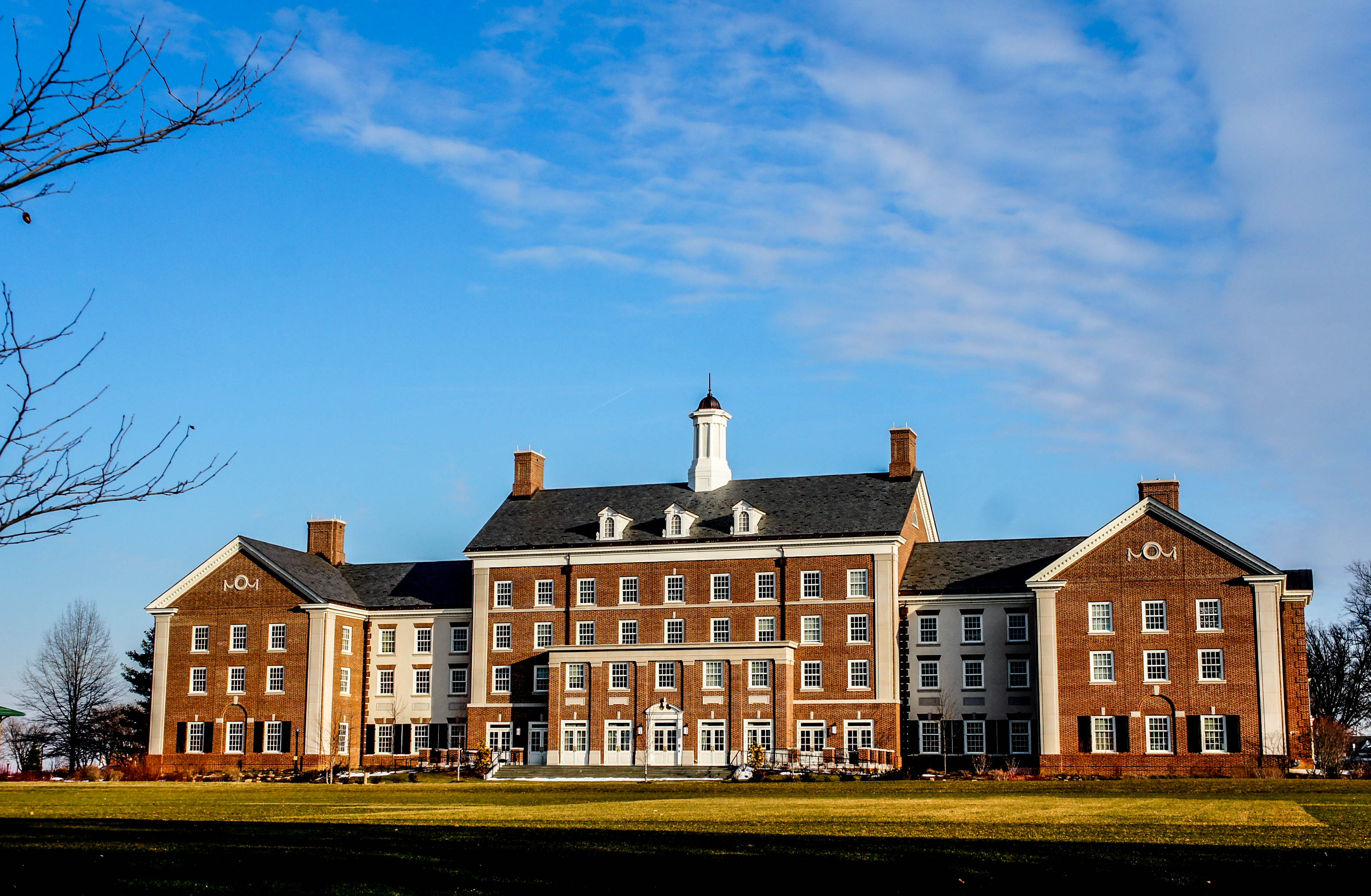
Roschel College House

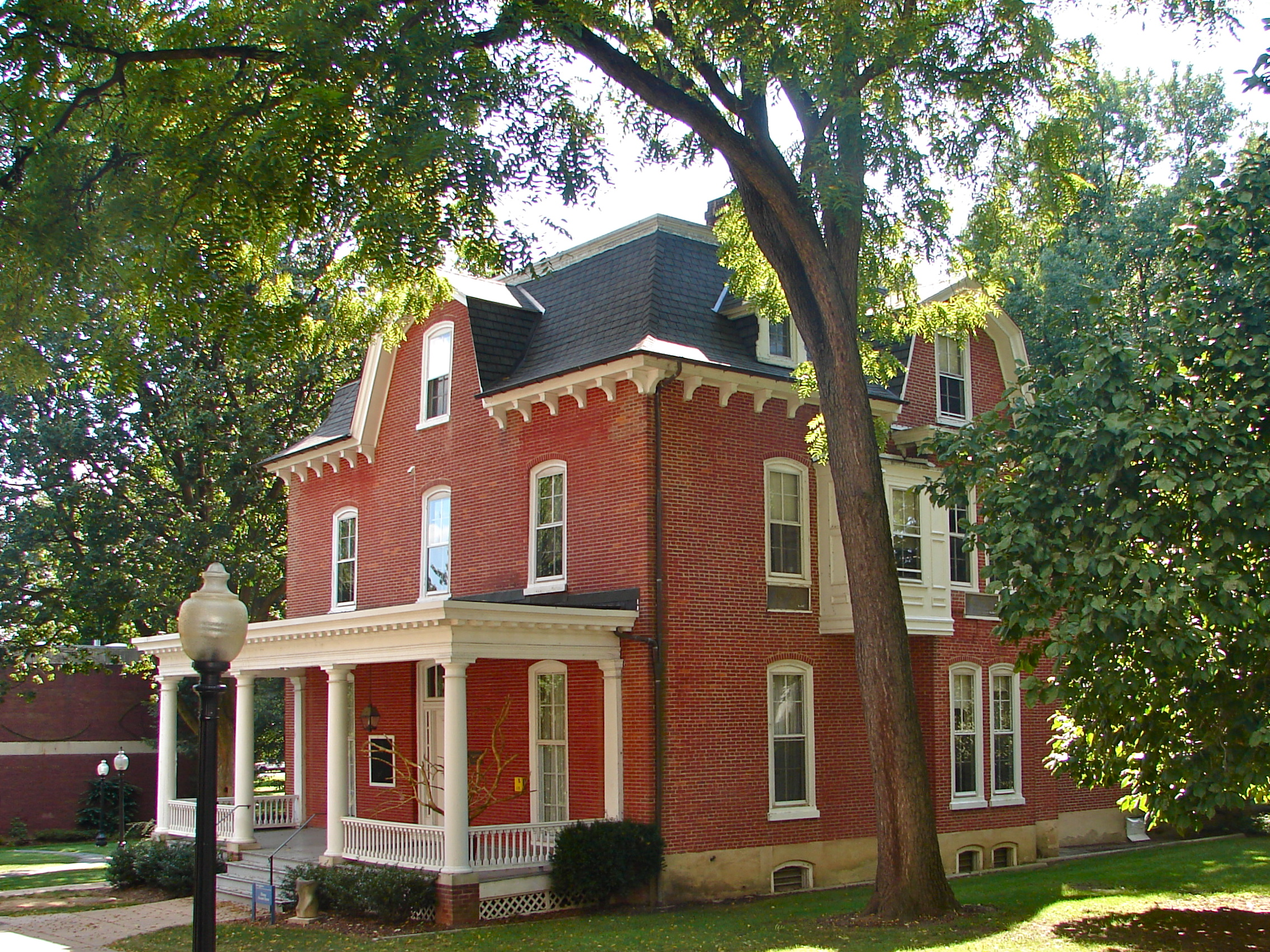
Alumni Hall

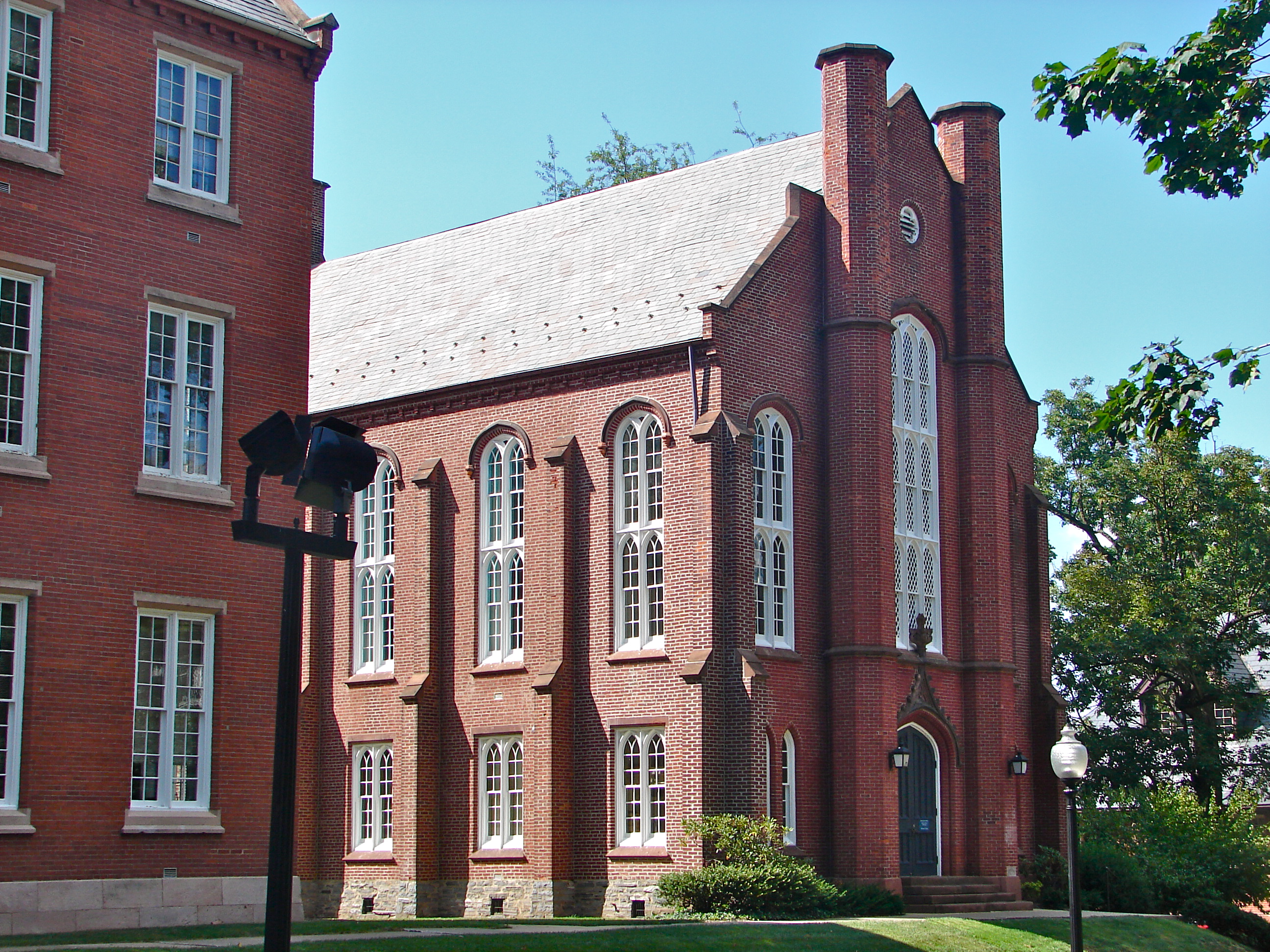
Diagnothian Hall

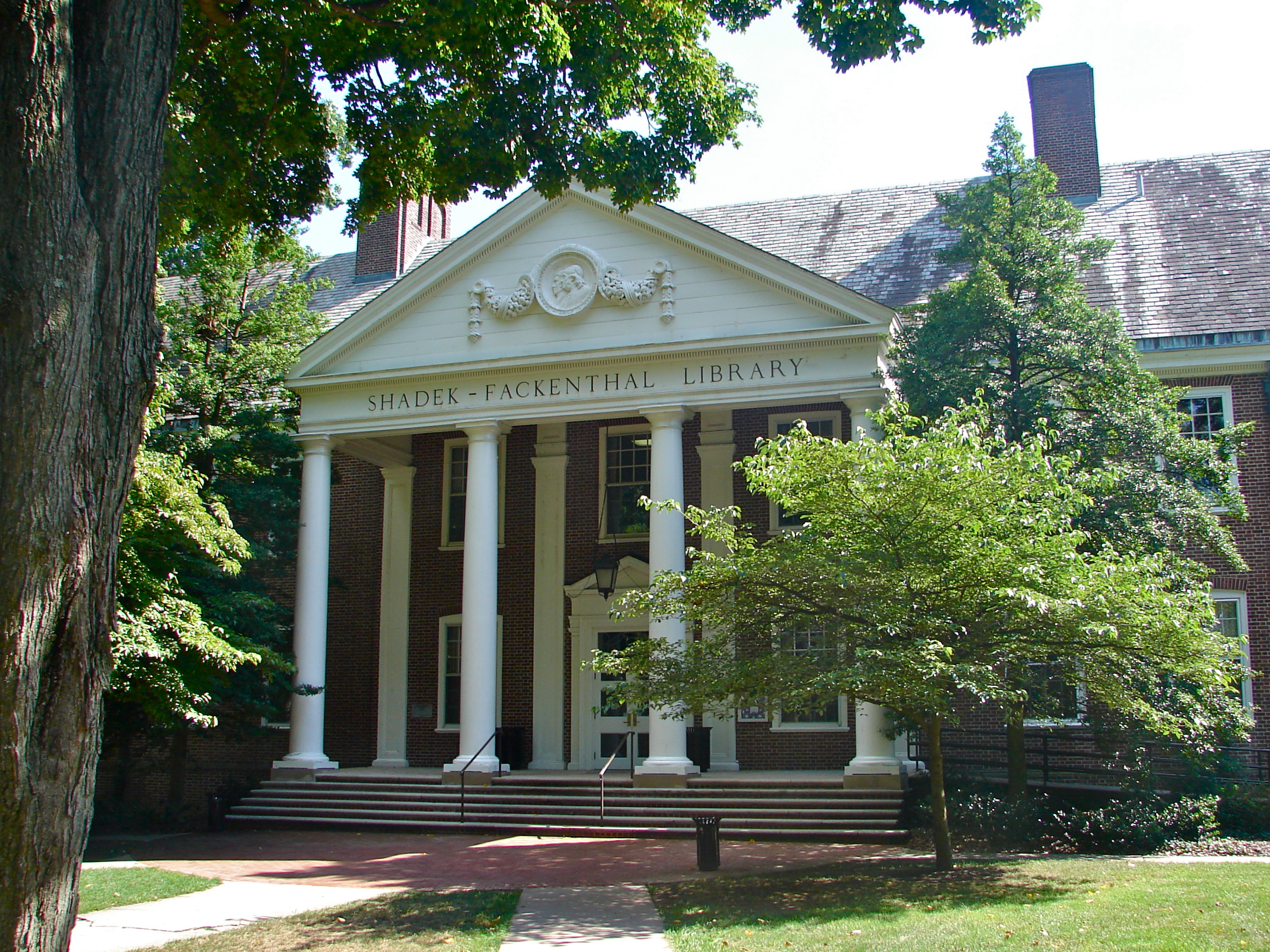
Library
