= Philip Schaff =

Swiss-born, American theologian and ecclesiastical historian (1819–1893)

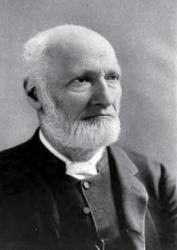
- Schaff c. 1880
- Born: January 1, 1819; Chur, Switzerland
- Died: October 20, 1893 (aged 74); New York City, US
- Children: David Schley Schaff

Academic background
- Education: University of Berlin
- Academic advisor: F. W. J. Schelling
- Influences: Ferdinand Christian Baur; Julius Müller; August Neander; David Strauss; August Tholuck

Academic work
- Discipline: Theology; history
- Sub-discipline: Ecclesiastical history
- Institutions: University of Berlin; Mercersburg Seminary; Union Theological Seminary

Philip Schaff (January 1, 1819 – October 20, 1893) was a Swiss-born, German-educated Protestant theologian and ecclesiastical historian, who spent most of his adult life living and teaching in the United States.

== Life and career ==
Schaff was born in Chur, Switzerland, and educated at the gymnasium of Stuttgart. His father died when he was young and he was sent to an orphanage.

At the universities of Tübingen, Halle and Berlin, he was successively influenced by Ferdinand Christian Baur and Schmid, by Friedrich August Tholuck and Julius Müller, by David Strauss and, above all, Johann August Wilhelm Neander. At Berlin in 1841 he took the degree of Bachelor of Divinity and passed examinations for a professorship. He then traveled through Italy and Sicily as tutor to Baron Krischer. In 1842, he was Privatdozent in the University of Berlin, where he lectured on exegesis and ecclesiastical history. In 1843, he was called to become Professor of Church History and Biblical Literature in the German Reformed Theological Seminary of Mercersburg, Pennsylvania, then the only seminary of that church in America. During his time there, he spoke positively of some medieval Catholics and of the Oxford Movement and he was accused of heresy; a church council exonerated him.

On his journey Schaff stayed in England and met Edward Pusey and other Tractarians. His inaugural address on The Principle of Protestantism, delivered in German at Reading, Pennsylvania, in 1844, and published in German with an English translation by John Williamson Nevin was a pioneer work in English in the field of symbolics (that is, the authoritative ecclesiastical formulations of religious doctrines in creeds or confessions). This address and the "Mercersburg theology" which he taught seemed too pro-Catholic to some, and he was charged with heresy. But, at the synod at York in 1845, he was unanimously acquitted.

Schaff's broad views strongly influenced the German Reformed Church, through his teaching at Mercersburg, through his championship of English in German Reformed churches and schools in America, through his hymnal (1859), through his labours as chairman of the committee which prepared a new liturgy, and by his edition (1863) of the Heidelberg Catechism. So much so that when the German Reformed Church, in a desire to begin producing more and better published material for the denomination published Samuel Miller's work entitled A Treatise on Mercersburg Theology: Mercersburg and Modern Theology Compared in 1866. Schaff's History of the Apostolic Church (in German, 1851; in English, 1853) and his History of the Christian Church (7 vols., 1858–1890), opened a new period in American study of ecclesiastical history.

In 1854, Schaff visited Europe, representing the American German churches at the ecclesiastical diet at Frankfurt am Main and at the Swiss pastoral conference at Basel. He lectured in Germany on America, and received the degree of Doctor of Divinity from Berlin.

In consequence of the ravages of the American Civil War the theological seminary at Mercersburg was closed for a while and so in 1863 Schaff became secretary of the Sabbath Committee (which opposed the "continental Sunday") in New York City, and held the position till 1870. In 1865 he founded the first German Sunday School in Stuttgart. In 1862–1867 he lectured on ecclesiastical history at Andover Theological Seminary.

Schaff was a member of the Leipzig Historical Society, the Netherland Historical Society, and other historical and literary societies in Europe and America. He was one of the founders, and honorary secretary, of the American branch of the Evangelical Alliance, and was sent to Europe in 1869, 1872, and 1873 to arrange for the general conference of the Alliance, which, after two postponements on account of the Franco-Prussian War, was held in New York in October 1873. Schaff was also, in 1871, one of the Alliance delegates to the emperor of Russia to plead for the religious liberty of his subjects in the Baltic provinces.

Schaff became a professor at Union Theological Seminary, New York City in 1870 holding first the chair of theological encyclopedia and Christian symbolism till 1873, of Hebrew and the cognate languages till 1874, of sacred literature till 1887, and finally of church history, until his death.

He died October 20, 1893, following a stroke. He is buried in Woodlawn Cemetery in The Bronx, New York City.

== Writings ==
Schaff served as president of the committee that translated the American Standard Version of the Bible, though he died before it was published in 1901.

Schaff's History of the Christian Church resembled Neander's work, though less biographical, and was pictorial rather than philosophical. He also wrote biographies, catechisms and hymnals for children, manuals of religious verse, lectures and essays on Dante, etc. He translated Johann Jakob Herzog's Real-Encyklopädie für protestantische Theologie und Kirche (Encyclopedia in Real Terms of Protestant Theology and Church) into English.

Working with the Evangelical Alliance and the Chicago (1893) World's Parliament of Religions, and in Germany, through the monthly Kirchenfreund, Schaff strove earnestly to promote Christian unity and union. It was his hope that the Pope (then Leo XIII) would abandon the doctrine of infallibility and undertake the reunion of Christianity. He recognized that he was a "mediator between German and Anglo-American theology and Christianity."

Schaff was commissioned to supervise the first series of the Nicene and Post-Nicene Fathers. He was later joined by Henry Wace.

== David Schaff ==
Schaff's son, David Schley Schaff, was a Presbyterian clergyman and professor of church history. David wrote his father's biography in 1897.

== Legacy ==
Schaff was married to Mary Schley and they had seven children.

Schaff also wrote several hymns.

The Philip Schaff Prize is an award given by the American Society of Church History, which he founded in 1888, for works presenting original research on the history of Christianity.

== Works ==
- The Principle of Protestantism (1845)
- What is Church History? (1846)
- History of the Apostolic Church (in German, 1851; in English, 1853) 1874 English ed.
- The Life and Labors of St. Augustine (1854)
- Germany: Its Universities, Theology and Religion (1857)
- History of the Christian Church (8 vols.) (1858-1890) (vols. 5-6 about the Middle Ages were finished by his son David Schley Schaff)
- Slavery and the Bible (1861)
- The Creeds of Christendom, with a History and Critical Notes (3 vols., 1877), vol. I, vol. II, vol. III
- Through Bible Lands: Notes of Travel in Egypt, the Desert and Palestine (New York: American Tract Society, 1878)
- A Library of Religious Poetry. A collection of The Best Religious Poems of all Ages and Tongues (with Arthur Gilman) (London: 1881)
- The New Schaff-Herzog Encyclopedia of Religious Knowledge. Schaff edited the European Herzog encyclopedia for an American audience; this is a revision of that work. vol. IX
- Philip Schaff's Letter book, private correspondence from June 2, 1868 to August 26, 1881.
- Early Church Fathers, a 38-volume translation in 3 parts, covering the Apostolic Fathers through Afphrahat.
- Dictionary of the Bible (1887)

== See also ==
- Nicene and Post-Nicene Fathers
- Schaff–Herzog Encyclopedia of Religious Knowledge
