= Evangelical Association of Reformed and Congregational Christian Churches =

American evangelical denomination

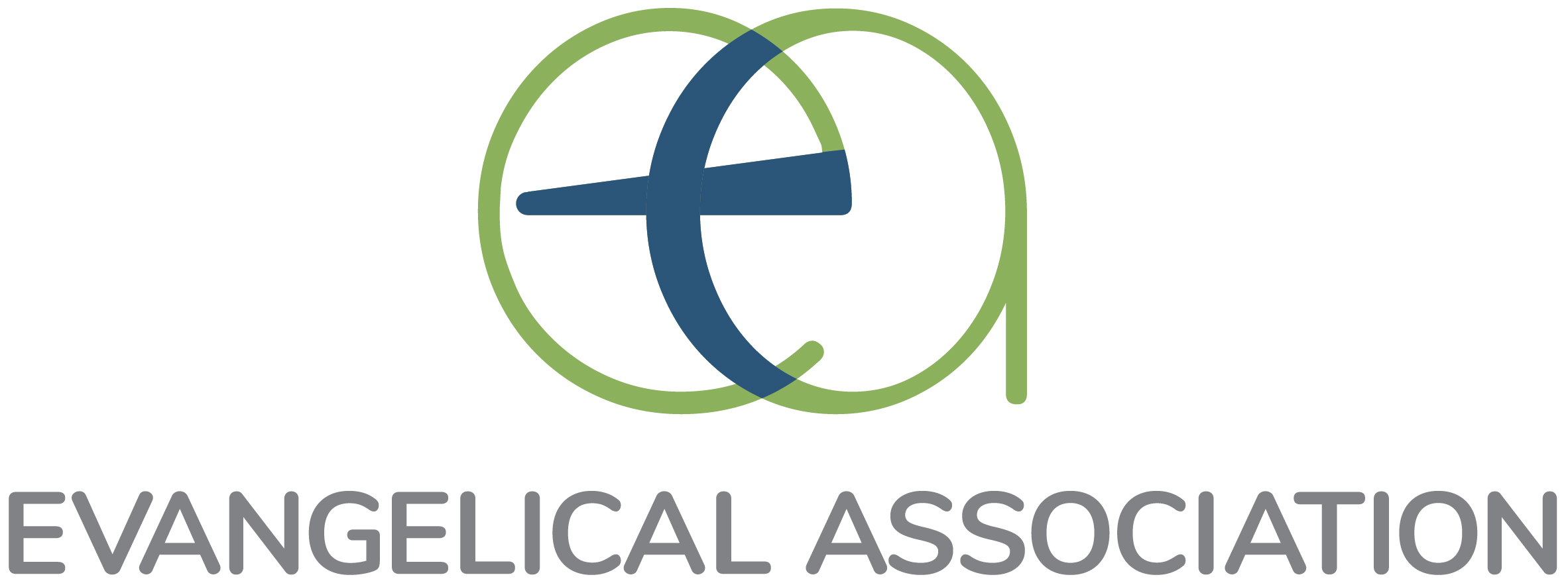
- Abbreviation: EA, EARCCC
- Orientation: Evangelical, Reformed
- Polity: Congregational
- Governance: Board
- National Minister: The Rev. Jim Barnes
- President: The Rev. Dr. Thomas Hendershot
- Region: United States
- Origin: 1998; New Braunfels, Texas
- Branched from: United Church of Christ
- Congregations: 260 (2024)
- Official website: evangelicalassociation.org/
- Slogan: revitalize. reproduce.

The Evangelical Association of Reformed and Congregational Christian Churches (EA or EARCCC) is an evangelical protestant denomination in the United States. It began as a fellowship of churches disaffected from the United Church of Christ due to that denomination's liberal theology. Churches of the Evangelical Association are free to hold dual affiliation with another denomination (mostly the UCC), as local churches observe congregational polity.

The association's name refers to those denominations that once merged to form the UCC: the Evangelical and Reformed and the Congregational Christian Churches.

== History ==
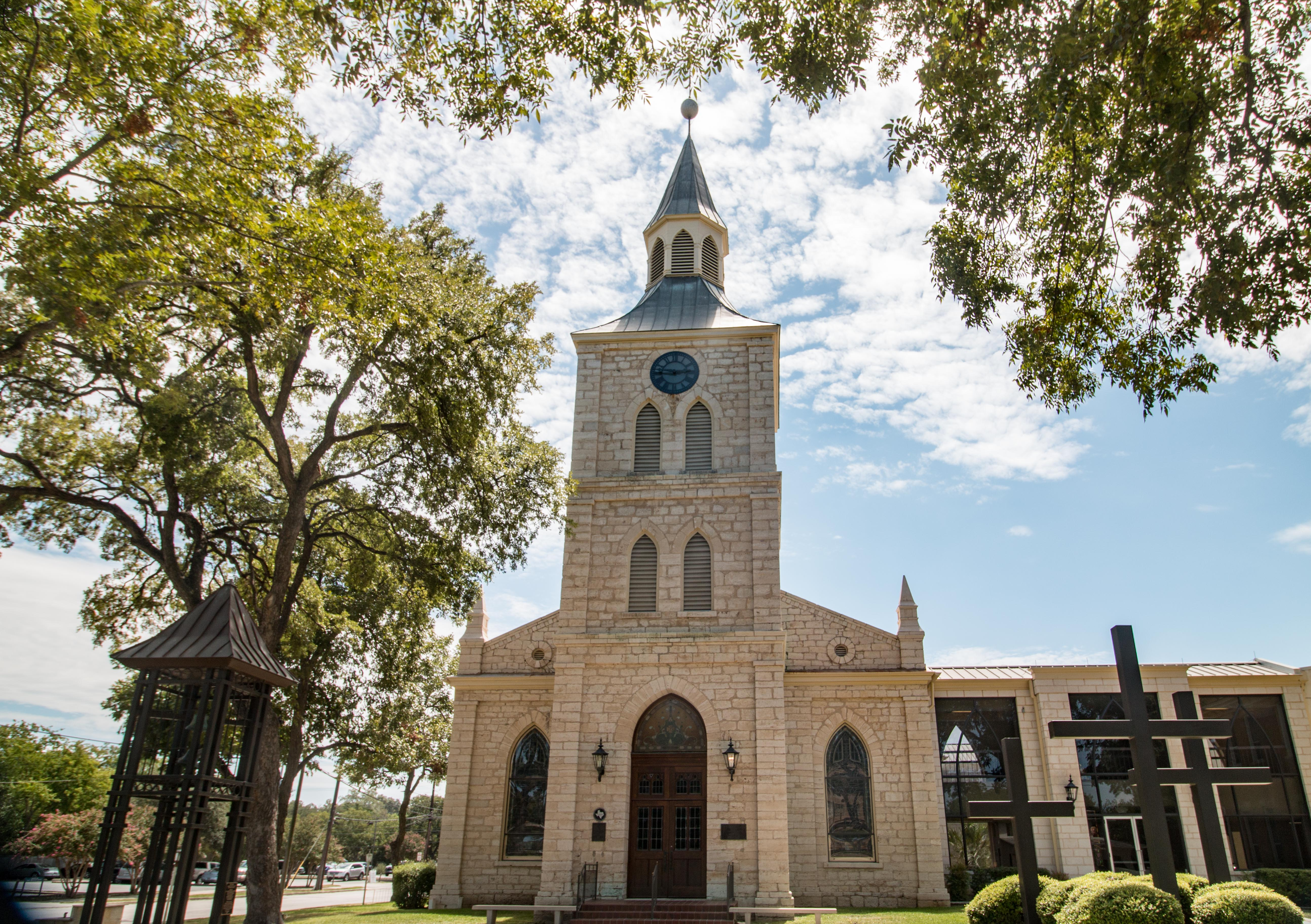
First Protestant Church in New Braunfels, Texas.

The EA began in 1998 from meetings between the clergy of First Protestant Church in New Braunfels, Texas and St. John's Evangelical Protestant Church in Cullman, Alabama, two large UCC congregations of Evangelical and Reformed (German Protestant) heritage. A core group resulting from interested churches of like mind brought about this initiative to provide a more orthodox alternative fellowship to the UCC in particular matters such as ministerial placement and foreign missions work. Many of the founding churches had been active in the Biblical Witness Fellowship organization, a renewal group similar to others in connectional denominations such as the United Methodist Church and the Presbyterian Church (USA).

The incident that caused many of the EA's current congregations to depart the UCC was that denomination's action at its 2005 General Synod to permit same-sex marriages. Some congregations that had been considering disaffiliation expedited the process in order to disassociate from national entities as quickly as possible. Nearly 300 churches withdrew from the UCC over a four-year period following the General Synod's measure.

The denomination is growing steadily. In 2008 they listed 48 churches, 105 by September 2017, and 260 by April 2024. Pennsylvania and North Carolina have the greatest concentration of churches. Most churches are in the Midwest, South and Northeast, although there are West Coast churches in San Francisco and Los Angeles. The congregations in the EA represent the historical predecessors of the UCC.

== Faith and practice ==
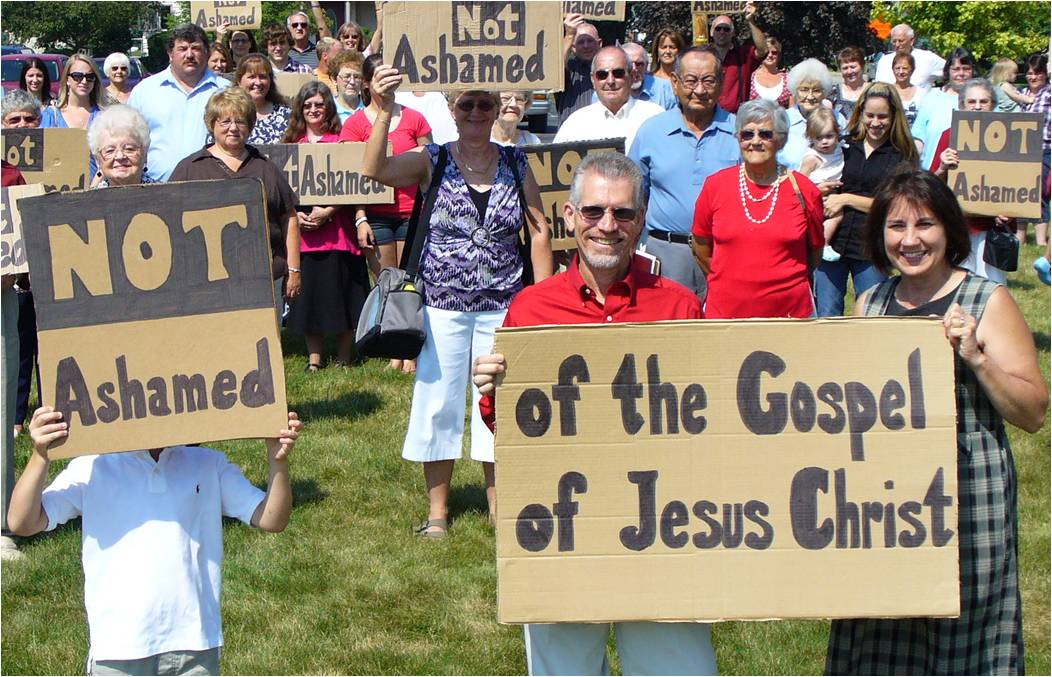
Members of Cross Community Church, an EA affiliated congregation in Berne, Indiana, pose for a photo published on the Evangelical Association's Desk Calendar

The EA requires its constituent churches to affirm both the Apostles' Creed and Nicene Creed and to subscribe to a statement of faith, which explicitly proclaims exclusive salvation in Jesus Christ and denounces extramarital sexual activity or encouragement of the same. Other than those requirements for membership, the EA considers each local congregation as a "complete church" that possess all of the rights and responsibilities of the Universal Church as bestowed upon it by the Holy Spirit and set forth in God's Word.

Each local church has the right to govern its own affairs, including the right to ordain its own clergy. Local churches ordain in a manner similar to other Congregational bodies, through ecclesiastical councils made up of area ecumenical Christian clergy who review candidates who have completed either a Bible college or seminary education.

The combination of creedal subscription on the one hand and the rights of self-governance on the other makes the EA very similar to Lutheran denominations, which reflects the Evangelical Synod heritage of some of its congregations. Otherwise, the polity is in effect almost identical to that of the UCC, which almost all the group's congregations once belonged to.

EA churches recognize two sacraments: Baptism and the Lord's Supper or Holy Communion, which local churches are permitted to administer according to their own customs; like the UCC, the EA has no official doctrine pertaining to those ordinances. EA churches administer both infant and adult baptism, by sprinkling (namely among former E&R congregations) or believers' baptism by immersion (former Christian Connection churches).

== See also ==
- Conservative Congregational Christian Conference, a similar congregationalist denomination in the United States
