= Eden Theological Seminary =

Christian Seminary in Missouri

Coordinates: 38.5927°N 90.3455°W

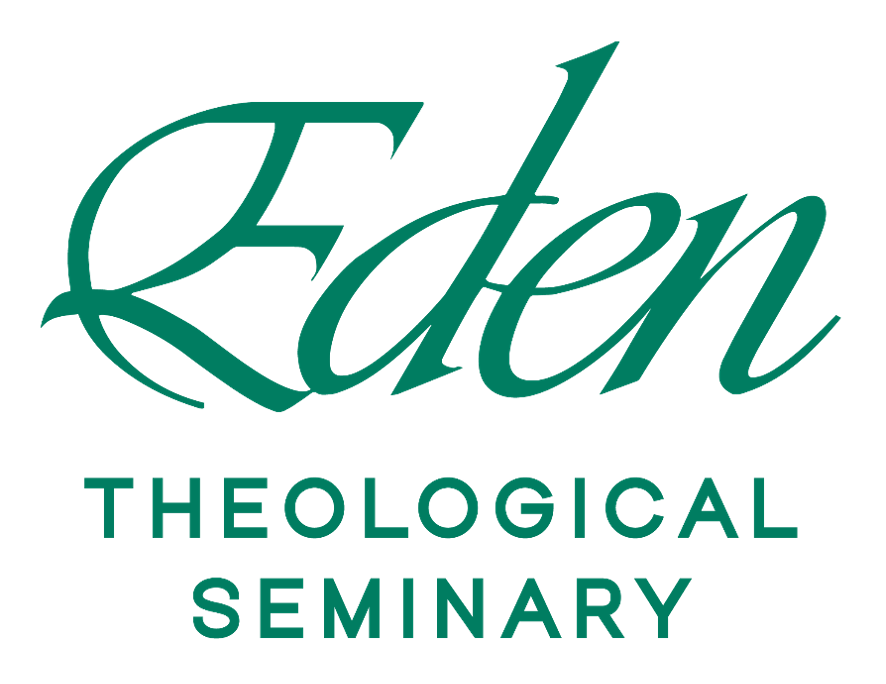
- Type: Seminary
- Established: 1850; 176 years ago
- Accreditation: Association of Theological Schools (ATS) and Higher Learning Commission
- Religious affiliation: United Church of Christ
- President: Deborah Krause
- Dean: Henry S. Kuo
- Faculty: 8
- Students: 88
- Location: Webster Groves, Missouri, United States
- Website: www.eden.edu

Eden Theological Seminary is a Christian seminary based in Webster Groves, Missouri. It is one of the six official seminaries of the United Church of Christ (UCC).

== History ==
The seminary was established in 1850 by German pastors in Marthasville, Missouri, as Das Deutsche Evangelische Predigerseminar or, more locally, as the German Evangelical Seminary. At the time, the goal was to equip pastors to lead and minister to frontier churches. The pastors soon formed the German Evangelical Synod of North America which, after subsequent mergers, became a part of the United Church of Christ (UCC).

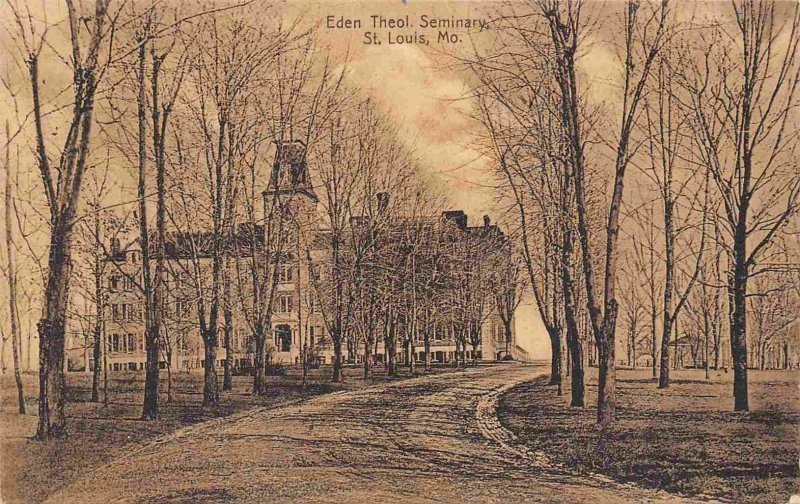
The Eden Seminary campus at Wellston

In 1883, the seminary moved to what would become Wellston, Missouri and built a campus there. The campus was only a mile away from the Eden Station of the Wabash, St. Louis, and Pacific Railroad. Ministerial candidates, usually from Elmhurst College, an Evangelical Synod of North America college near Chicago, would arrive at the Seminary by getting off at the Eden Station and, eventually, the Seminary would be colloquially referred to as the "Eden Seminary." The campus was purchased by Normandy High School in 1923.

In 1924, the seminary moved to its current campus in Webster Groves. The school was augmented in 1934 by a merger with the Central Theological Seminary, an institution of the Reformed Church in the United States in Dayton, Ohio, and the Oakwood Institute of Cincinnati, Ohio. This coincided with the merger of the two denominations into the Evangelical and Reformed Church. Conversations at Eden Theological Seminary, beginning in 1937, led to the 1957 merger of the Evangelical and Reformed Church and the Congregational Christian Churches to form the United Church of Christ.

=== Presidents ===
Term	Name	Notes
1850-1857	Wilhelm Binner	
1857-1870	Andreas Irion (jointly with Adolf Baltzer, 1862-1866)	
1871-1872	Johann Bank	
1872-1879	Karl E. Otto	
1879-1902	Louis Haeberle	
1902–1919	William Becker	
1919–1941	Samuel D. Press	Namesake for Press Hall. Press was known as the "Teacher of the Niebuhrs" and oversaw the seminary's move to Webster Groves. Prior to his presidency, he was a member of Eden's faculty from 1908 and was the first full-time professor to teach exclusively in English.
1941–1962	Frederich Schroeder	
1962–1981	Robert Fauth	
1981–1986	Malcolm Warford	After Eden, Warford served as president of Bangor Theological Seminary from 1987 to 1995.
1986–1993	Eugene S. Wehrli	Namesake for Wehrli Chapel. Was Professor of New Testament from 1960 to 1986 during which he was interim academic dean and dean of students. He was a 1948 B.D. graduate. He also held the Evangelical Professorship of Biblical Interpretation.
1993–1996	Charles R. Kniker	Prior to Eden, Kniker was professor of education at Iowa State University for 24 years and at one point was assistant dean of the College of Education. He was a 1963 M.Div. graduate.
1997–2020	David Greenhaw	Prior to Eden, Greenhaw was Dean of Lancaster Theological Seminary.
2020 – Present	Deborah Krause	First woman president of Eden Seminary and 1988 M.Div. graduate. Prior to her presidency, she was Professor of New Testament since 1992 and academic dean from 2005 to 2018.

== Academics ==
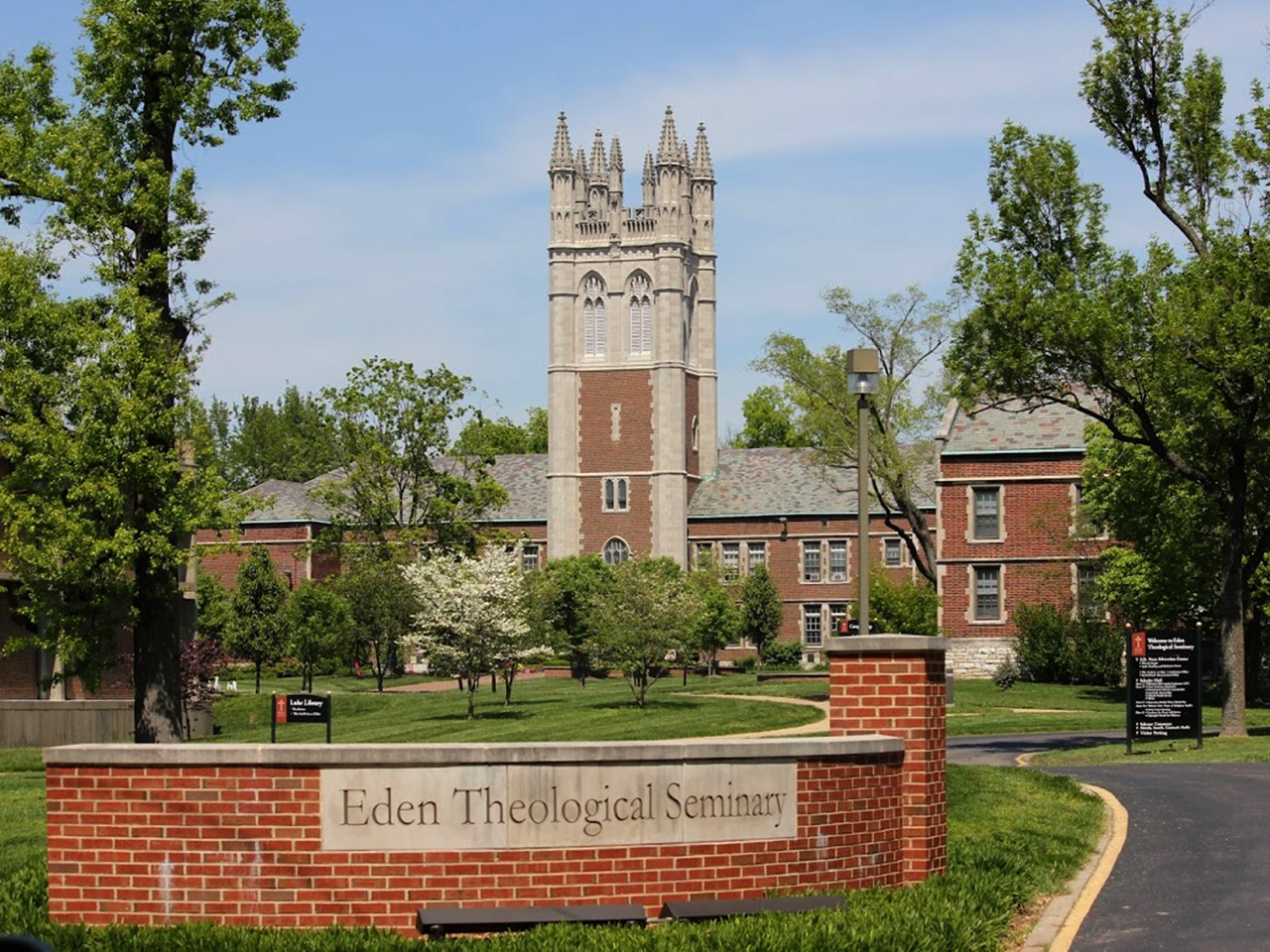
Samuel D. Press Education Center

Eden Theological Seminary offers five degree programs:

- Master of Divinity (M.Div.)
- Master of Community Leadership (M.C.L.)
- Master of Arts in Professional Studies (M.A.P.S.)
- Master of Theological Studies (M.T.S.)
- Doctor of Ministry (D.Min.)

All classes and programming are offered in blended format with students participating fully on campus and online.

=== Campus ===
The Samuel D. Press Education Center is the heart of the Eden Seminary campus. The tower was inspired by Oxford's Magdalen Tower. The Center contains faculty and staff offices, classrooms, institutional archives, the Luhr Reading Room, and the Wehrli Chapel. Also in the Center is a bookstore serving churches and the wider community.

Duhan and Schultz Halls were among the original buildings of the campus and, with the Press Center and Luhr Building, surround the Wiese Quadrangle. Duhan Hall provides on-campus housing for students and visiting faculty. Schultz Hall houses the offices of Peace United Church of Christ and the Missouri Mid-South Conference of the UCC along with other apartments for area students.

Schroer Commons was the Seminary's refectory but continues to host events and dinners. The building was named after Rev. Dr. Hale Schroer. Schroer was professor of preaching and worship, Dean of Students and Dean of the Chapel at Eden Seminary.

A group of apartment buildings - Goetsch Hall, North Hall, and South Hall - provide on-campus housing for students. The Seminary also provides housing for faculty members, including the seminary's president, around the campus.

=== The Webster-Eden library system ===
In 1968, Eden Theological Seminary built the Luhr Library to house its collections. The next year, it was approached by Webster University. The two schools agreed to put their collections together, and the Luhr building became the library building for both the seminary and Webster University.

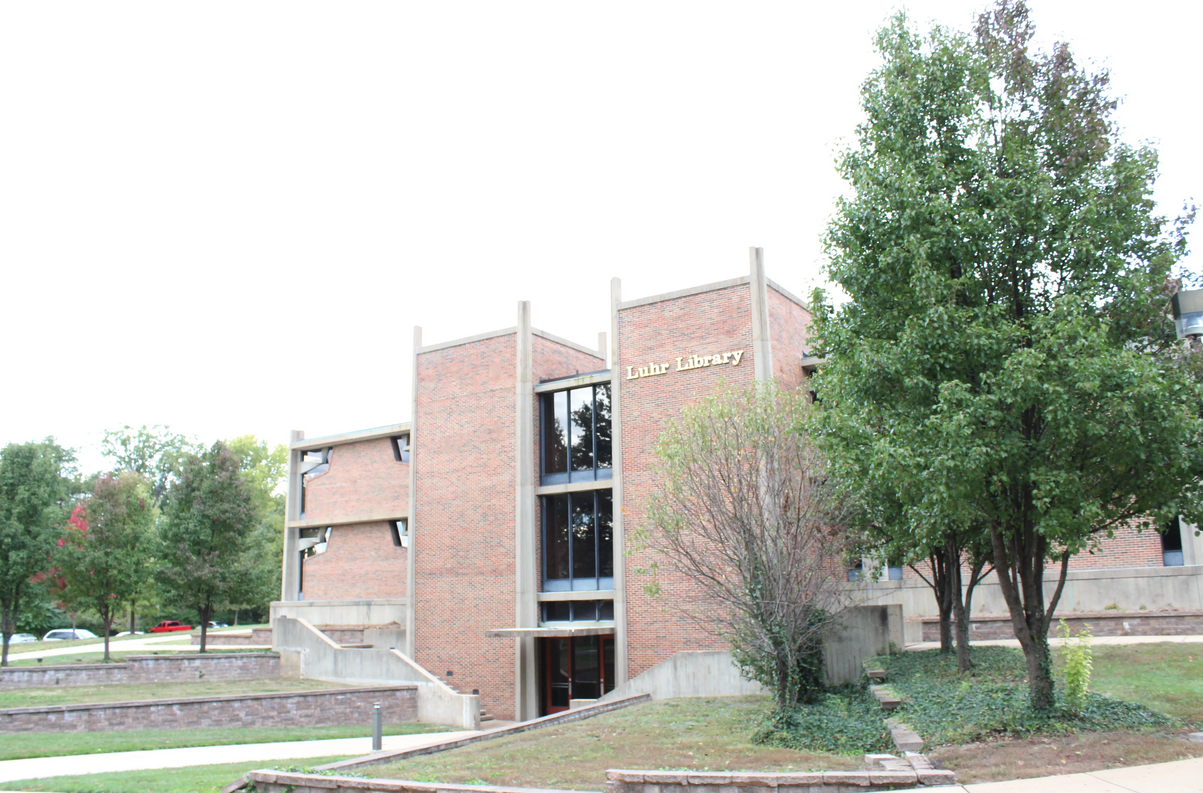
Luhr Building

In 2003, the book collections outgrew the capacities of the Luhr building and the books were moved to the newly constructed Emerson Library at Webster University, where the library remains to this day. The Emerson Library is open to both Eden Seminary and Webster University students, and is a member of the MOBIUS library consortium. Eden Seminary maintains its historically significant books and religious/theology reference collections in the Luhr Reading Room in the Samuel Press Hall. In 2010, the Luhr building was sold to Webster University, which uses it for its institutional technology department and the chess team.

== Notable faculty and alumni ==
=== Pastors and denominational leaders ===
- Seth Senyo Agidi (MTS and D.Min.): Moderator of the General Assembly of the Evangelical Presbyterian Church, Ghana.
- Traci D. Blackmon (M.Div. 2009): Former Associate General Minister for Justice and Witness Ministries at the United Church of Christ from 2015 - 2023 and a leading spiritual voice in the Black Lives Matter movement. She also served on President Barack Obama's White House Office of Faith-Based and Neighborhood Partnerships.
- John C. Dorhauer (M.Div. 1988): 9th General Minister and President of the United Church of Christ.
- Musa Maina (MTS 2005): Moderator of the Reformed Church of East Africa from 2007-2019. He led the RCEA to approve of the ordination of women. He was awarded an honorary Doctor of Divinity from Eden in 2019.
- Kristopher D. Schondelmeyer (M.Div. 2010): Co-Moderator of the 227th General Assembly of the Presbyterian Church (USA) and senior pastor of First Presbyterian Church of Davenport, Iowa.
- Jesse Williams (M.Div. 1991, D.Min. 1999): President of the Lott Carey Foreign Mission Convention and pastor of Convent Avenue Baptist Church in Harlem.

=== Political and organizational leaders ===
- Rev. Jack Patrick Lewis (M.Div. 2010): Member of the Massachusetts House of Representatives (2016–present).
- Rear Adm. Peter Muschinske (Advanced Theological Studies certification 2012): Deputy Chief of Chaplains for Reserve Matters of the United States Navy
- Jeanette Mott Oxford (M.Div. 1989): First openly lesbian member of the Missouri House of Representatives from 2004 to 2012
- Rev. Dr. Starsky Wilson (M.Div.): President of the Children's Defense Fund

=== Theologians and scholars ===
- Walter Brueggemann (B.D. 1958): Professor at Eden Theological Seminary from 1961 to 1986 and then the William Marcellus McPheeters Professor of Old Testament at Columbia Theological Seminary from 1986 to 2003. He was awarded an honorary Doctor of Divinity degree from Eden in 1997
- Catherine Keller (M.Div. 1977): Professor of Constructive Theology at Drew University since 1986 and one of the leaders of Process theology
- Reinhold Niebuhr (B.D. 1913): Professor at Union Theological Seminary, recipient of the Presidential Medal of Freedom in 1964, and author of Moral Man and Immoral Society and The Nature and Destiny of Man
- H. Richard Niebuhr (B.D. 1915): Professor at Eden Theological Seminary from 1919 to 1924 and 1927–1931, president of Elmhurst College from 1924 to 1927, then professor of theology and ethics at Yale University from 1931 to 1962, and author of Christ and Culture.
