= Justice and Witness Ministries =

Religious ministry

Justice and Witness Ministries (JWM) is one of five covenanted ministries of the United Church of Christ. JWM is responsible for national office ministries related to four areas: economic justice; "human rights, justice for women and transformation"; "public life and social policy"; and "racial justice".

The justice page of the UCC homepage reports the statement that "Doing justice, seeking peace and building community are central to the identity of the United Church of Christ", although no formal resolution of synod has ever made this declaration of denominational identity.

== Locations and organization ==
In addition to its offices in Cleveland, JWM also maintains an office on Capitol Hill in Washington, D.C. JWM is also affiliated with:

- Franklinton Center at Bricks, a conference, retreat, and educational facility in eastern North Carolina with a focus on justice advocacy and leadership development.
- Centro Romero, a border immersion Center focusing on issues of globalization, economic policy, immigration and community empowerment in San Ysidro, California.
- Pilgrim Firs, a space for studying environmental justice that is part of a partnership with the Pacific/Northwest Conference of the United Church of Christ.

The current Executive Minister for Justice and Witness Ministries is Ms. M. Linda Jaramillo.

The JWM has four teams:

- Economic Justice Ministry Team
- Human Rights, Justice for Women, and Transformation Ministry Team
- Racial Justice Ministry Team
- Public Life and Social Policy Ministry Team (based in Washington, D.C.)

Bernice Powell Jackson was the Executive Minister of JWM from the creation of the post in 1999 (during the UCC National office reorganization) until 2005. Prior to leaving the UCC, Bernice Powell Jackson was elected in 2004 as the President of the North American Region of the World Council of Churches .

== Relationship to other bodies within the UCC ==
JWM regularly sponsors General Synod resolutions, especially ones dealing with perceived justice issues of the day. JWM also maintains an office called "Minister for Children, Families and Human Sexuality Advocacy" that promotes the Our Whole Lives sex education curriculum.

Their web presence is as follows:

- The Justice tab at ucc.org,
- The UCC "Justice and Peace Action Network", a mass email network, to include the "our faith our vote" political engagement campaign.
- The "www.ucctakeaction.org" automated system for writing your congressperson.

== Political Stands and external engagement ==
In addition to is internal activities JWM has allied with organizations outside the UCC and endorsed legislation and political positions. Such positions include the following:

- Supporting Universal Access to Health Insurance
- Ending the genocide in Sudan
- Maintaining membership in the Religious Coalition for Reproductive Choice
- lamenting the Supreme Court's decision to limit partial-birth abortions
- Endorsing a statement against abstinence-only sexual education and involving the UCC in the Sexuality Information and Education Council of the United States National Coalition to Support Sexuality Education
- Supporting the cause of Washington, D.C residents to get legislative representation
- Speaking out in favor of equal marriage rights for same-sex couples against state and federal legislation that would limit marriage to one man and one woman.
- Speaking out against the Federal Marriage Amendment that would limit same-sex marriage saying that the constitutional amendment "reflects a fundamental disregard for individual civil rights"
- Participated as the only quasi-church organization in the National School Boards Association Q&A guide to entitled "Dealing with Legal Matters Surrounding Students' Sexual Orientation and Gender Identity" whose October release was officially timed to coincide with Lesbian, Gay, Bisexual and Transgender History Month
- Supporting the labor movement including endorsing the National Farm Worker Ministry , and encouraging boycotts (Mt. Olive Pickle Company alongside Farm Labor Organizing Committee , Taco Bell alongside Coalition of Immokalee Workers) on behalf of farm workers, and enrolling in a living wage campaign
- Protesting the Iraq war and support and promotion of the September 24, 2005 United for Peace and Justice rally in Washington, D.C, alongside the ANSWER coalition.
- Endorsing a rejection of the No Child Left Behind act.
- Sponsoring a study to correlate locations of racial minorities and the placement of toxic waste dumps
- Joining the Coalition on Human Needs in endorsing a statement against the President's proposed 2007 Budget. Publishing a 20-page study guide for understanding the shortcomings of President Bush's proposed Federal budget and signed on to a proposed priorities for the 110th Congress
- Endorsing a "Walmart week of action" to protest Walmart.
- Opposing the death penalty and coordinating several letter-writing campaigns to the Tennessee governor’s office supporting clemency for Philip Workman.
- Sponsoring an art show for Puerto Rican independence advocates convicted of criminal/terrorist activity

== Opponents and critics ==
Given that the United Church of Christ has no explicit political orientation, the statements and actions of the type issued by JWM has been criticized by conservatives within the UCC.

- Notable UCC Blogger critic UCCtruths.org has accused former JWM minister Bernice Powell Jackson of being a "spin doctor" when making justice statements on behalf of JWM.
- renewal group Biblical Witness Fellowship has accused The UCC and other mainline denominational leaders of "long [drawing] their issues and positions directly from the playbook of leftist political groups" . BWF states "An increasingly divisive ideological agenda by denominational leaders and antagonism following the failed dialogue [in the years 1991–2005] increase[d] the rates of loss to their highest in UCC history...In the United Church of Christ, Denominational leaders and Conference Ministers bear personal responsibility for the loss of members and churches. This is a sad legacy."
- In response to the consistently leftist statements issued by JWM, The Biblical Witness Fellowship submitted (and General Synod passed) a 2001 resolution "Mutual Respect Within Faith Communities" that sought to limit the kinds of statements that were made by denominational leaders.
