= Conservative Congregational Christian Conference =

Congregationalist denomination in the United States

- Abbreviation: CCCC, 4Cs
- Classification: Evangelical Protestant
- Orientation: Congregationalist
- Polity: Congregational
- President: The Rev. Scott Nice
- Conference Minister: The Rev. Dr. Ron Hamilton
- Associations: World Evangelical Congregational Fellowship; National Association of Evangelicals
- Region: United States
- Headquarters: Lake Elmo, Minnesota
- Origin: 1948
- Branched from: Congregational Christian Churches
- Congregations: 301 (2023)
- Members: 42,296 (2010)
- Official website: www.ccccusa.com

The Conservative Congregational Christian Conference is a Congregationalist denomination in the United States. It is the most conservative and oldest Congregationalist denomination in America following the dissolution of the Congregational Christian Churches. It is a member of the World Evangelical Congregational Fellowship and the National Association of Evangelicals.

== History ==
=== Background ===
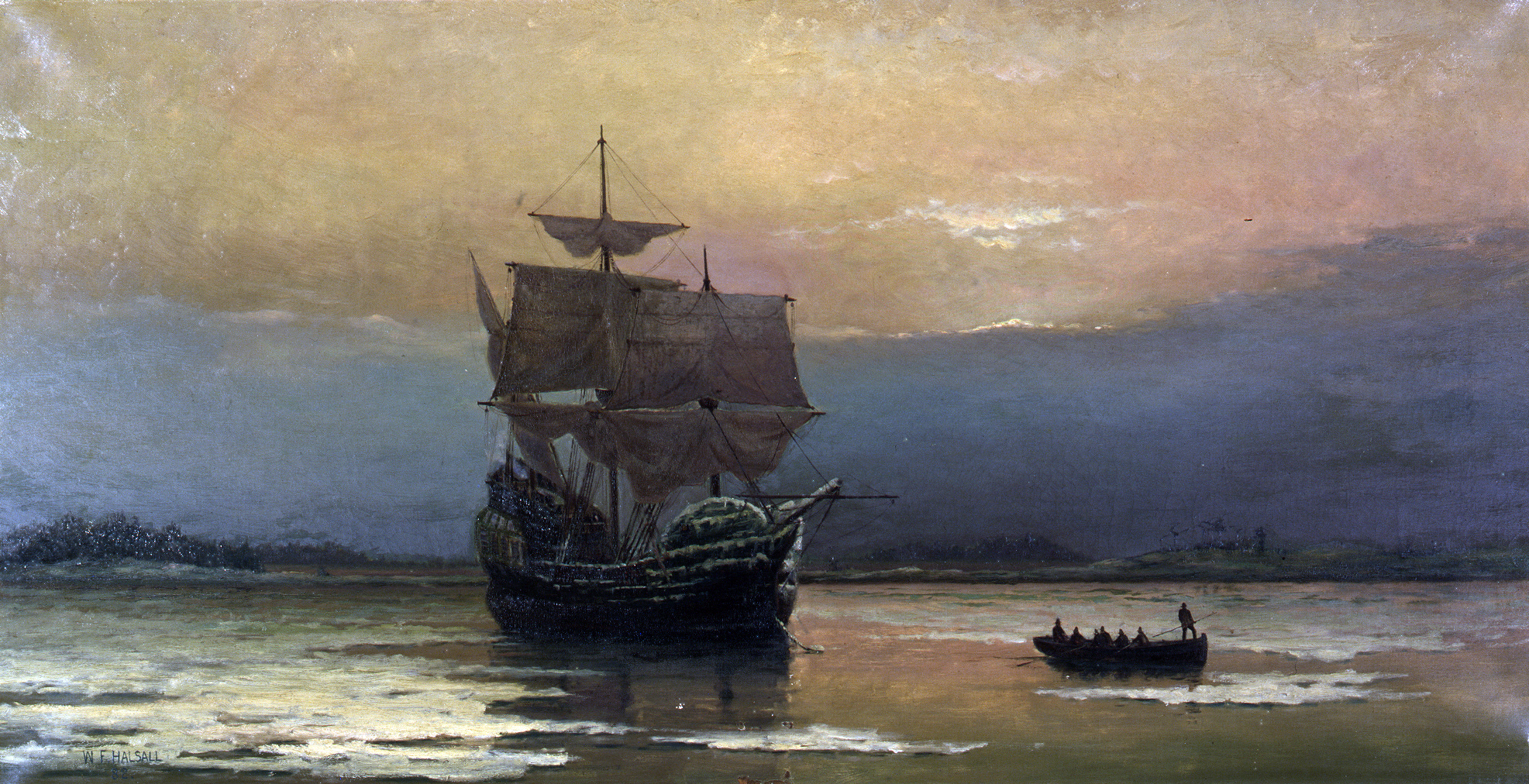
The Mayflower, and its passengers known as "Pilgrims", began the Great Migration to New England. The CCCC describes its members as "modern-day Pilgrims."

The congregationalist tradition traces itself to English and American Puritanism. Presbyterians and Congregationalists both opposed certain practices and liturgical requirements of the Church of England, including its episcopal polity. Presbyterians desired a system in which bodies of elders (presbyteries) would govern the churches, while congregationalists believed that local churches (congregations), each with its own elders, were to govern themselves individually (though, ideally, in communion and cooperation with similar congregations). As early as the 16th century, the Brownists advocated for independent congregations. New England ministers formalized the congregationalist system with the Cambridge Platform of 1648, and those in England with the Savoy Declaration of 1658.

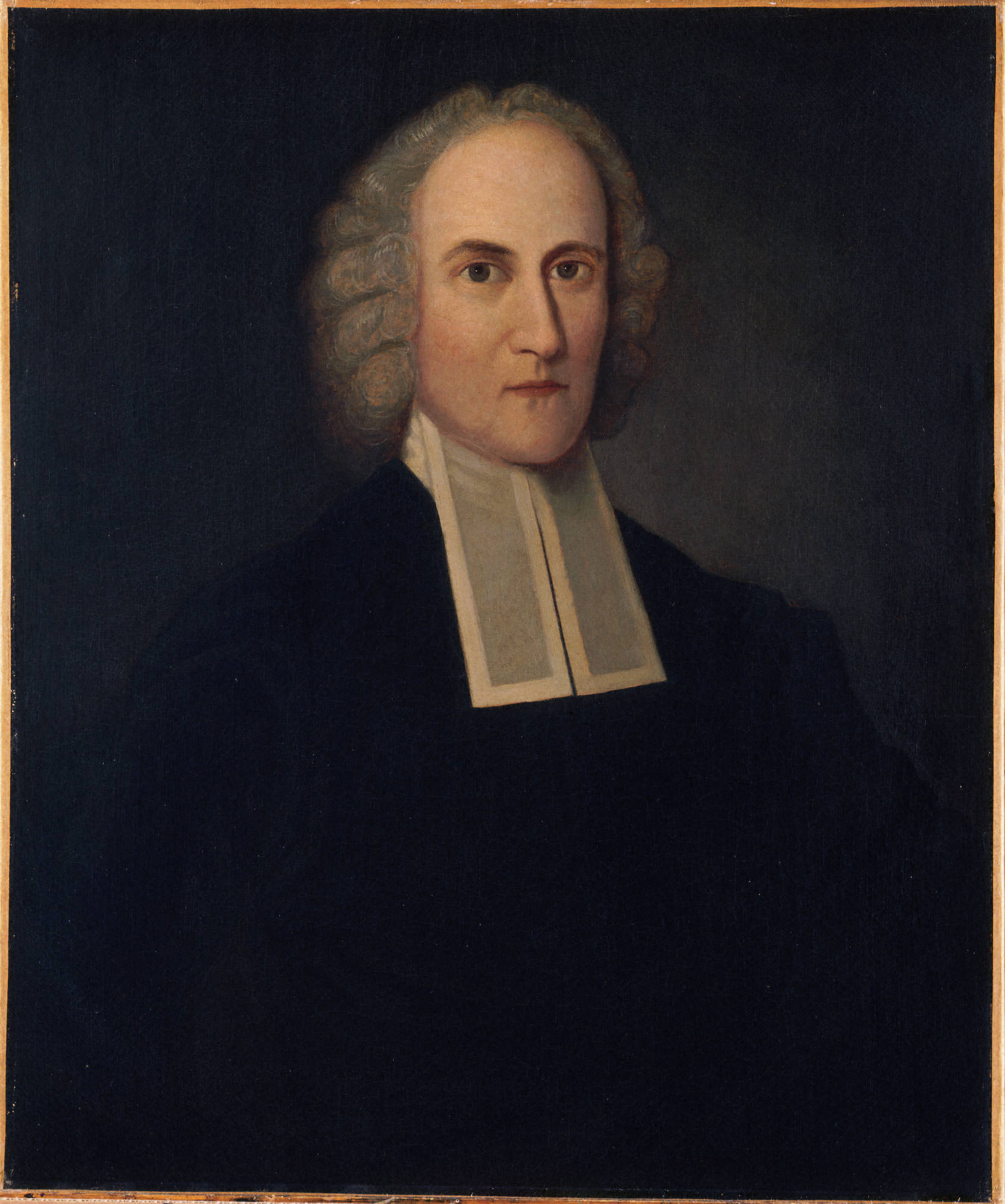
Jonathan Edwards, Congregationalist theologian and influential figure in the First Great Awakening.

Congregationalists enjoyed the dominant position in early New England: theirs was the established church of several states, even into the 19th century. Congregationalists founded several prominent universities, including Harvard and Yale. They were key players in the First and Second Great Awakening and in the modern mission movement, establishing the American Board of Commissioners for Foreign Missions.

After the Civil War, the American denominational mainline formed the National Council of the Congregational Churches of the United States, which in 1931 merged with the restorationist Christian Connection and became the Congregational Christian Churches (CCC).

=== Denominational Origins ===
The CCCC has its roots in the Conservative Congregational Christian Fellowship, formed in 1945 by conservative members of the CCC concerned about the dominance of liberalism in their denomination. Due to the decentralized nature of congregational polity, a denominational split was not first seen as necessary. Soon, conservatives became concerned with a proposed merger with the Evangelical and Reformed (E&R) church, fearing it would compromise their polity. Additionally, the terms of the proposed merger first required a 75% affirmative vote from all churches, but only received 53%. In 1948, the Fellowship established itself as the CCCC.

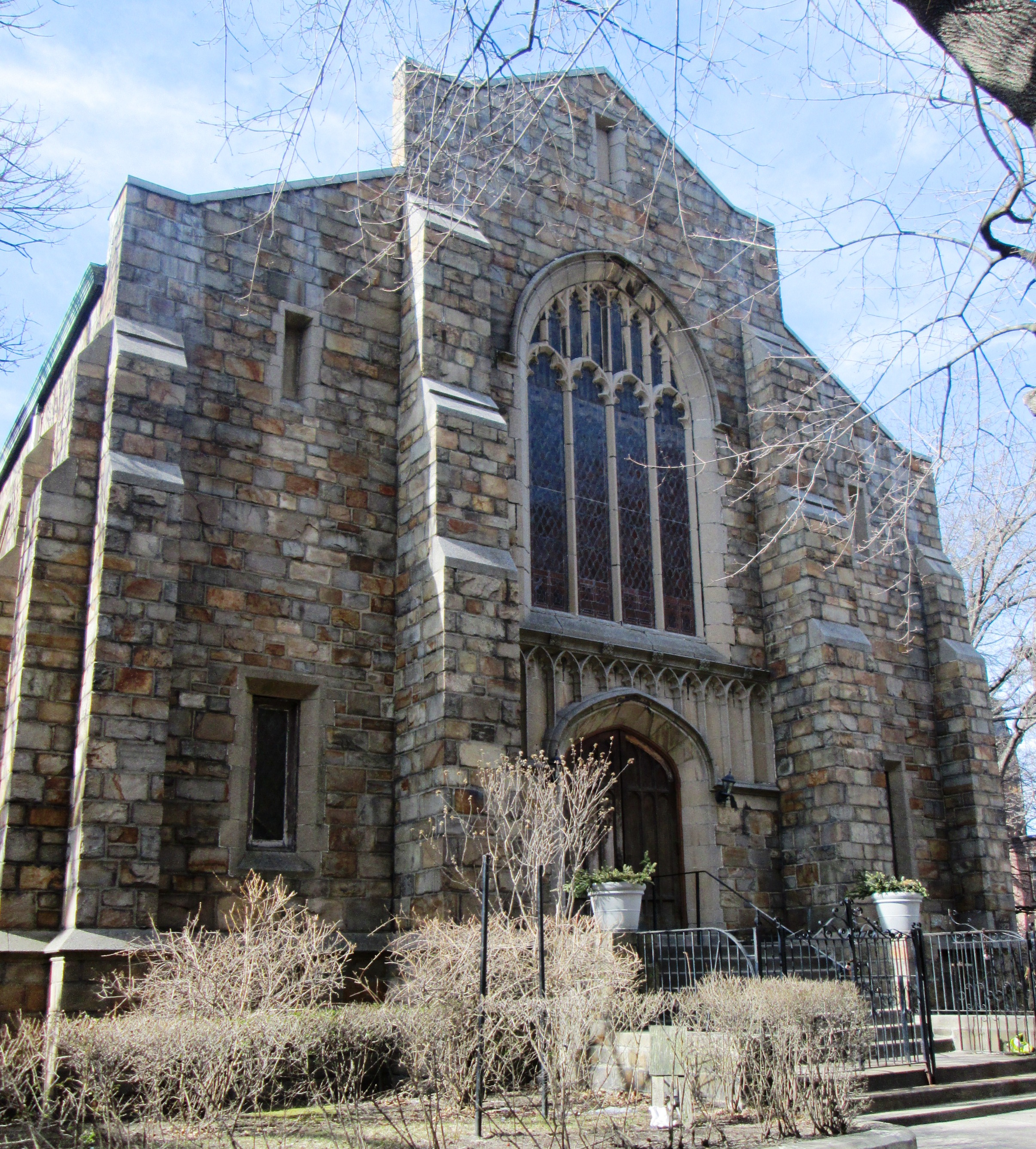
Brooklyn's Cadman Memorial Church (NACCC) sued to stop the formation of the United Church of Christ.

Concerned parties sued the General Council of the CCC in New York, Judge Steinbrink halting the merger in 1950. The New York Court of Appeals would reverse this judgment in 1953, allowing the CCC and E&R to ultimately form the United Church of Christ in 1957.

The CCCC was not the only Congregationalist denomination to oppose merger. Other churches left the CCC to become independent, or joined the National Association of Congregational Christian Churches (NACCC) which formed in 1955 over the same polity concerns, without concerns over liberal theology.

==== Genealogy ====
National Council of the Congregational Churches of the United States	Christian Connection
Congregational Christian Churches
Conservative Congregational Christian Conference	National Association of Congregational Christian Churches

Evangelical Synod of North America	Reformed Church in the United States
Evangelical and Reformed Church
United Church of Christ	Evangelical Association of Reformed and Congregational Christian Churches

== Theology ==
The CCCC is theologically conservative and evangelical. It opposes homosexuality, abortion, and non-marital sexual activity while promoting evangelism, missions and orthodox theology. Congregationalism is historically Reformed (Calvinist), and some ministers have an interest in the study and teachings of Puritanism, especially those in the Reformed Congregational Fellowship. However, both Reformed and Arminian emphases may be found in the CCCC, as is usually the case with larger, more broadly-based evangelical groups.

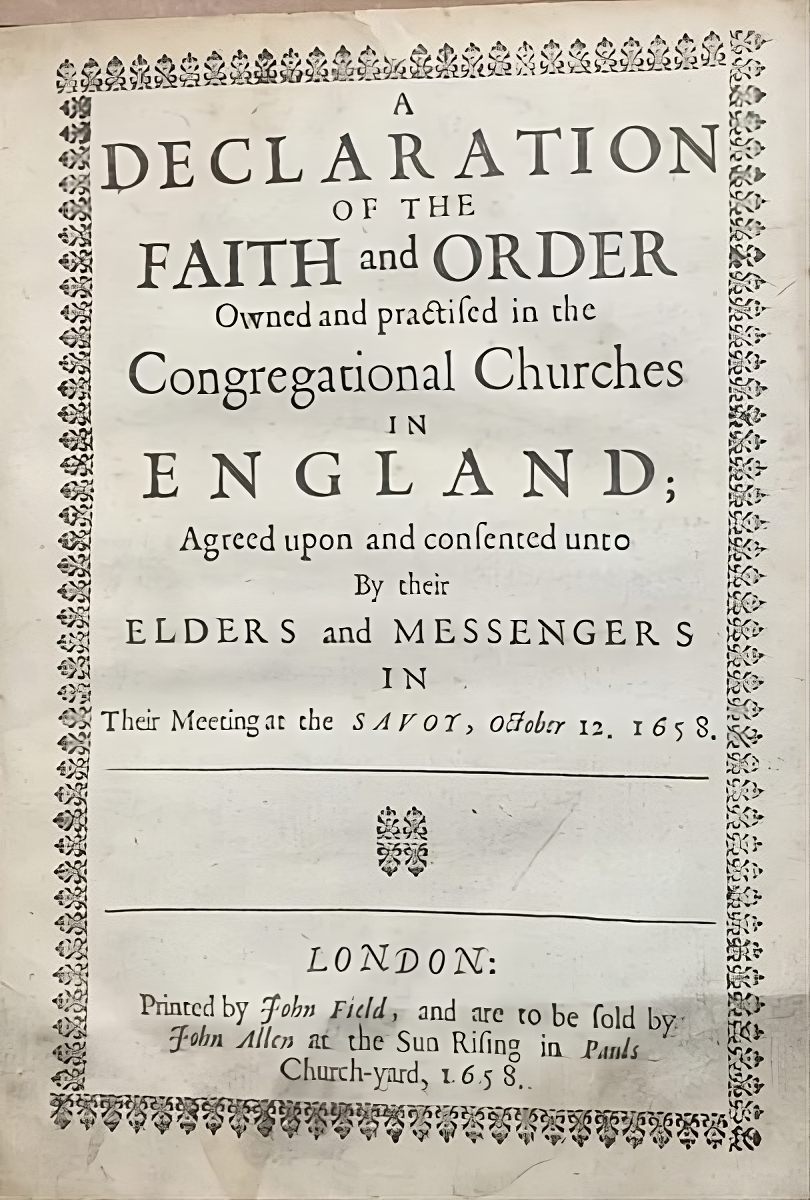
The CCCC reprints a collection of classical reformed documents, including the Savoy Declaration.

The CCCC Statement of Faith is short, just seven points, and contains most of the tenets of 20th century evangelicalism. These cover:

1. The inspiration, infallibility and inerrancy of the Bible.
2. The doctrine of the trinity.
3. The deity, virgin birth, sinlessness, miracles, atonement, resurrection, ascension and return of Christ.
4. The regeneration of sinful man.
5. The indwelling and ministry of the Holy Spirit.
6. The resurrection of the dead.
7. The unity of believers.

The Statement is almost identical to that of the National Association of Evangelicals. Harold Ockenga, a founder of the NAE, was a prominent pastor in the early years of the CCCC.

The conference does not govern the doctrine of its constituent churches, but it does occasionally produce position papers stating the denomination's view on various issues. These include statements on biblical marriage, the ministerial standing of women, racial reconciliation, the charismatic movement, homosexuality, abortion and euthanasia.

== Practices ==
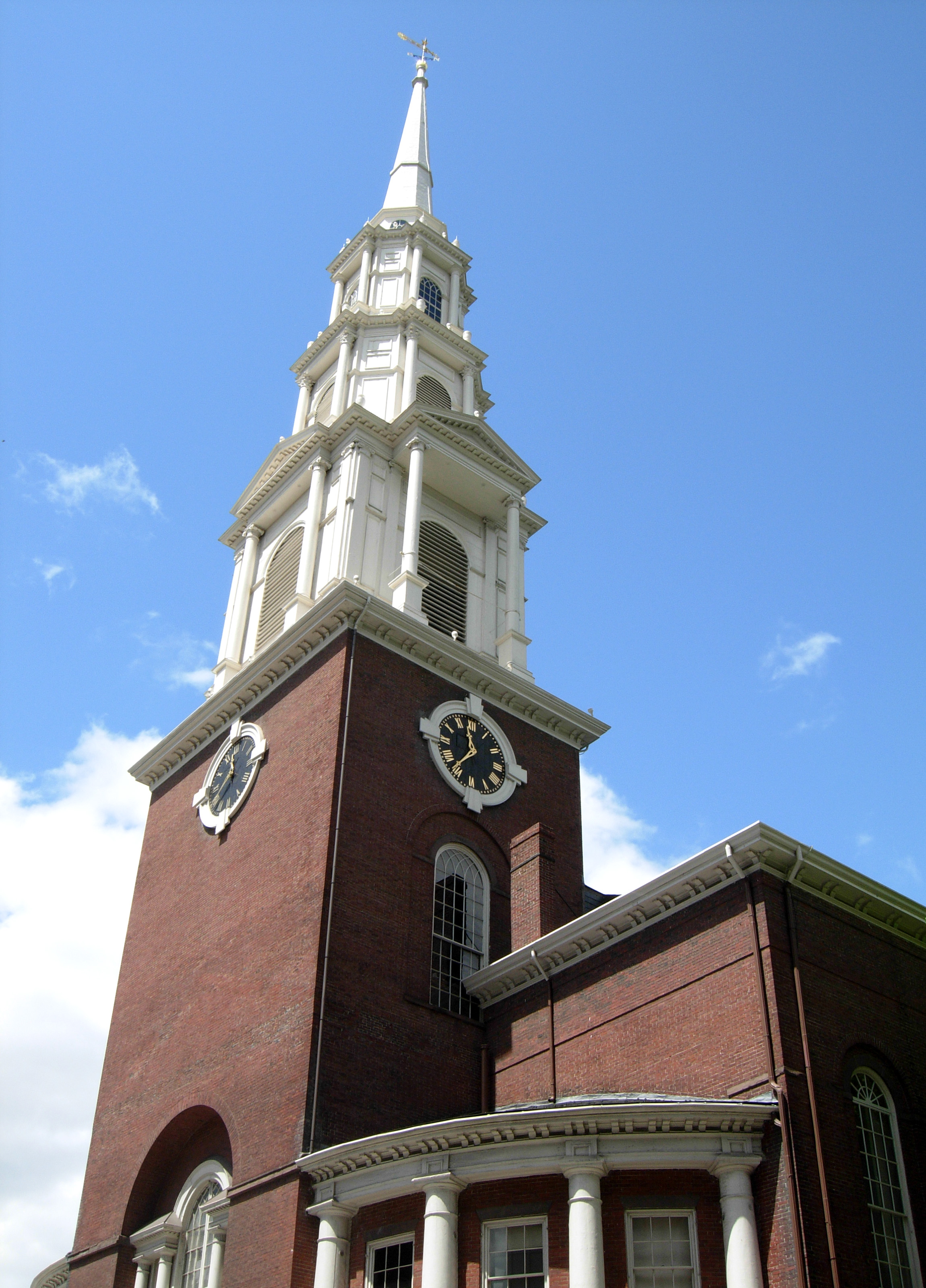
Park Street Church in Boston is a notable member church of the CCCC.

The CCCC admits churches of any origin that operate according to congregational polity, subscribe to the Statement of Faith, and support the activity of the conference.

Although committed to common points of faith, the CCCC does allow room for disagreement in matters not pertaining to those subjects addressed in the Statement.

We are a Conference that “majors in the majors”, i.e. clings to the non-negotiables of the historic, orthodox faith, while allowing freedom of form and expression of the great faith passed on to us. Our members have different evangelical theological traditions and perspectives. We allow for diversity of beliefs in secondary issues. Our churches are large and small, with worship that is traditional, contemporary, or blended.

Member churches derive not only from the founding Congregational and Christian Connection traditions, but also Evangelical and Reformed, independent Community churches, and Baptists. Most joining the CCCC have been existing churches rather than new church plants.

== Structure ==
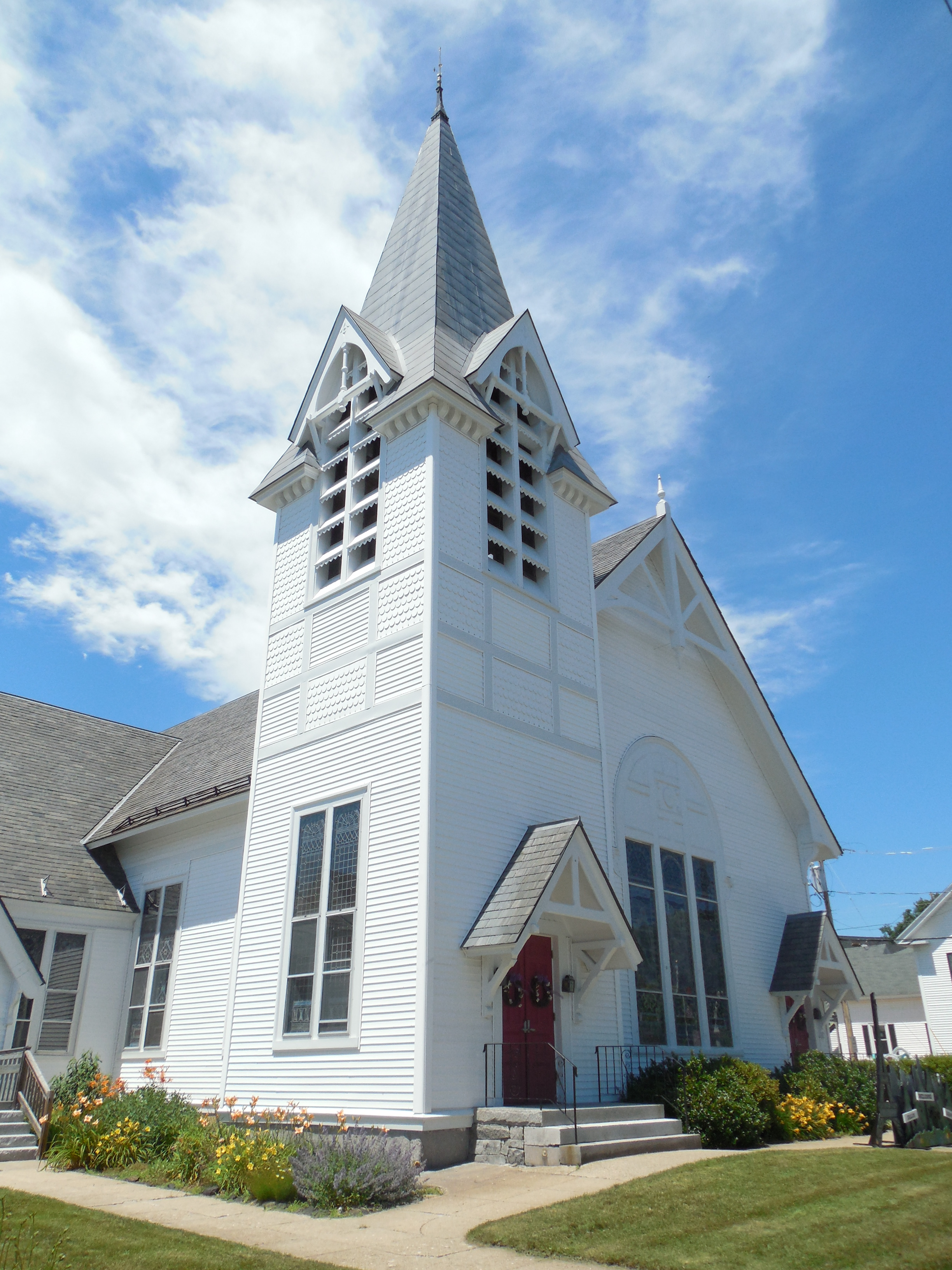
Goffstown Congregational Church, established 1768.

Conference membership is voluntary and afforded to churches, ministers, Consecrated Laborers, and individual laymen. The CCCC is divided into regions (Northeast, Mideast, Mid Atlantic, Southeast, North Central and West), with regional pastors, area pastors, and local fellowships. Moderators of each area fellowship are chosen by the local fellowship (composed of representatives from area CCCC churches and nearby CCCC member ministers). Area Representatives are appointed by the Conference Minister (who functions as the Executive Director or National Pastor for the CCCC). Area Representatives serve as local CCCC contacts, to represent the Conference Minister, and to serve as a liaison between the national organization and the area fellowships.

The Conference is governed by an elected board of directors of twelve to thirty people for established terms. The board is responsible for Conference business, the appointment of a Chaplaincy Endorsing Agent, and the denominational publication arm (the FORESEE).

Like other decentralized denominations (cf. the Friends' Yearly Meeting or Southern Baptist Convention), much of the denominational activity happens at an annual event, called the "Annual Gathering."

== Growth ==
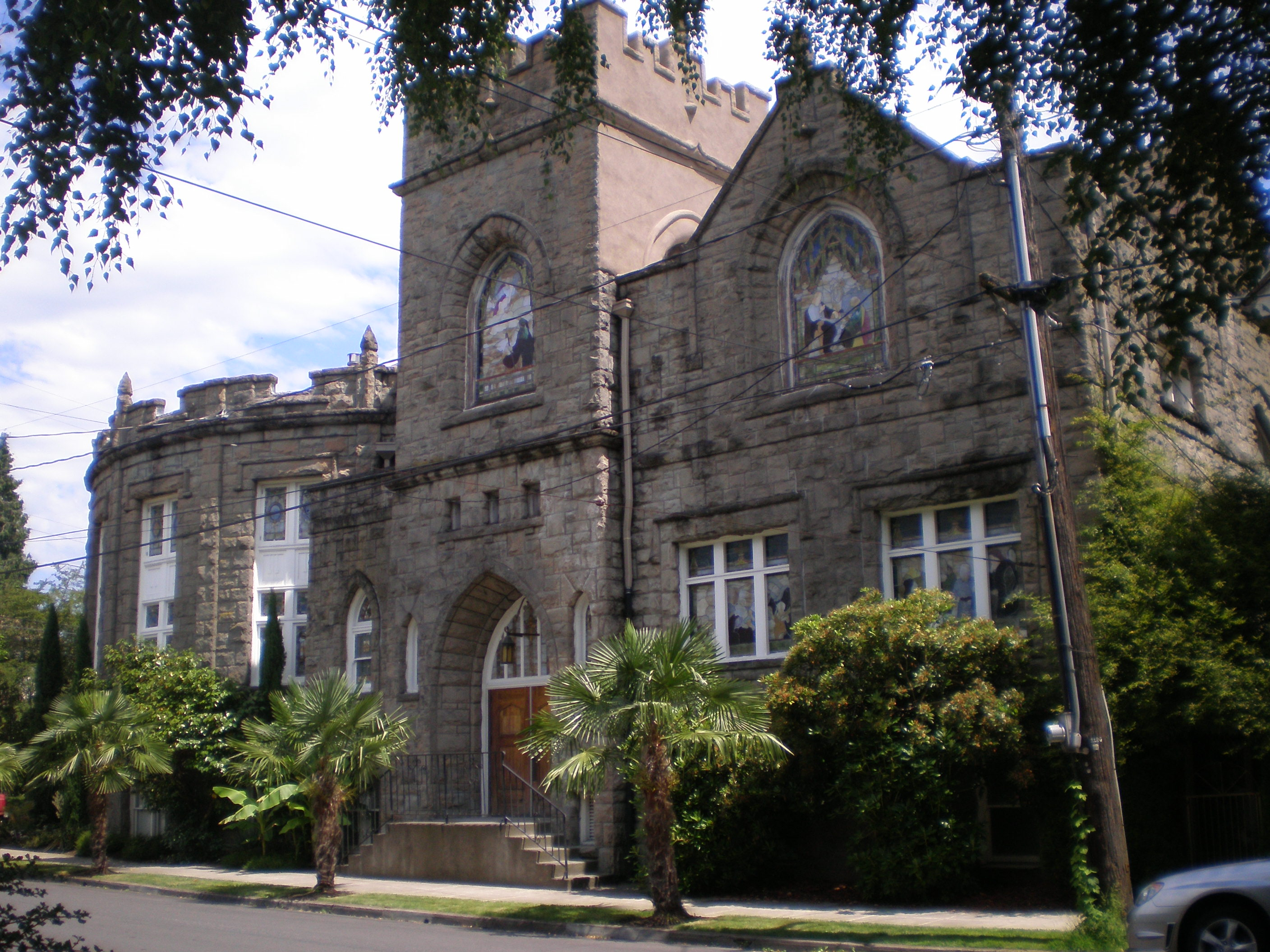
Staub Memorial Congregational Church in Portland, Oregon joined in 1958.

Over a quarter million members of Congregational Christian Churches opposed or abstained from the vote to form the UCC. Despite the scale of concern, the conference started very small, having only sixteen churches in 1959. It has experienced steady growth since its founding, with 34 churches in 1961, 132 in 1980, 256 in 2001, and 301 by 2023.

Membership is concentrated in the Northeast and Midwest. As of 2010, the CCCC had 42,296 members.

Church multiplication is a "ministry priority" of the CCCC, and the denomination operates a church planting arm called Nineveh Network.

== See also ==
- Congregational Library
- Congregationalism
- National Association of Congregational Christian Churches
- Evangelical Association of Reformed and Congregational Christian Churches

== Sources ==
Yearbook, Conservative Congregational Christian Conference
Handbook of Denominations, 12th edition (Abingdon Press)
Modern Day Pilgrims (2000: Foresee Publications, St. Paul, Minn.)
Foresee (official newsletter of the Conference)
