= BWF =

BWF may refer to:

== Sports organisations ==
=== Badminton ===
- Badminton World Federation, an international governing body for badminton

=== Professional wrestling ===
- Brazilian Wrestling Federation, a Brazilian Professional wrestling promotion.
- British Wrestling Federation, a 1960s alliance of independent UK professional wrestling promotions led by Paul Lincoln
- British Wrestling Federation, a 1980s/1990s UK professional wrestling promotion owned by Orig Williams

== Other ==
- Barrow/Walney Island Airfield IATA airport code
- Biblical Witness Fellowship, an evangelical renewal movement
- Broadcast Wave Format, an extension of the popular WAV audio format
- Burroughs Wellcome Fund
