= Federal Council of Churches =

Defunct ecumenical association of Christian denominations in the United States

Federal Council of the Churches of Christ in America
- Abbreviation: FCC
- Successor: National Council of Churches
- Formation: December 2, 1908
- Defunct: November 28, 1950
- Type: Ecumenical organization
- Headquarters: New York City, New York, U.S.
- Members: 33 Christian denominations (at peak)
- First President: Shailer Mathews
- Notable Leader: Samuel McCrea Cavert

The Federal Council of Churches, officially the Federal Council of Churches of Christ in America, was an ecumenical association of Christian denominations in the United States in the early twentieth century. It represented the Anglican, Baptist, Eastern Orthodox, Lutheran, Methodist, Moravian, Oriental Orthodox, Polish National Catholic, Presbyterian, and Reformed traditions of Christianity. It merged with other ecumenical bodies in 1950 to form the present day National Council of Churches.

== History ==
The Federal Council of Churches was founded at a convention that met at the Academy of Music in Philadelphia in May 1908. Originally the Council consisted of thirty-two denominations. By 1923, it maintained central offices at 105 East 22nd Street, New York City. It also had offices at the Woodward Building, Washington, D.C., and at 19 South La Salle Street, Chicago. In 1938, the Federal Council of Churches and the Catholic Church jointly released a statement condemning the attacks on Jews and religious minorities in response to Kristallnacht. This would be the first time that Catholic, Anglican and Protestant churches jointly issued a formal declaration.

== Social and political advocacy ==
The Federal Council of Churches was active in the Temperance and Prohibition of alcohol movements.

Additionally, the council was an organization that believed very deeply in democracy. In its statement on the nature and tasks of Christian Cooperation, the Council declared:

With the demand for industrial democracy the churches are intensely concerned, for democracy is the expression of Christianity.

=== The Social Creeds ===
"The Social Creed of the Churches" was a statement by members of the Federal Council of Churches in December 1908 against what it described as "industrial problems." The document spelled out a list of principles, including:

- Equal rights and complete justice for all men in all stations of life
- Protection of the worker from dangerous machinery, occupational disease, injuries, and mortality
- Abolition of child labor
- Regulation of the conditions of toil for women as shall safeguard the physical and moral health of the community
- A living wage as a minimum in every industry
- Provision for the old age of the workers and for those incapacitated by injury
- Abatement of poverty

Over time the Council included additional principles, including addressing the injustice of the unequal distribution of wealth.

Critics attacked the Federal Council of Churches as a front for communism.

== Member denominations ==
By 1923 the member denominations were as follows:

- African Methodist Episcopal Church
- African Methodist Episcopal Zion Church
- Colored Methodist Episcopal Church in America
- General Convention of the Christian Church
- Christian Reformed Church in North America
- Churches of God in North America (General Eldership)
- Disciples of Christ
- Episcopal Church
- Evangelical Synod of North America
- Evangelical Association
- Free Baptist Church
- Greek Orthodox Church
- Friends
- Methodist Episcopal Church
- Methodist Episcopal Church, South
- Methodist Protestant Church
- Moravian Church
- National Council of Congregational Churches
- National Baptist Convention
- Northern Baptist Convention
- Polish National Catholic Church
- Presbyterian Church in the United States of America
- Presbyterian Church in the United States
- Primitive Methodist Church
- Reformed Church in America
- Reformed Church in the United States
- Reformed Episcopal Church
- Reformed Presbyterian Church, General Synod
- Romanian Orthodox Church
- Russian Orthodox Church
- Seventh Day Baptist Church
- Syrian Orthodox Church
- United Brethren Church
- Ukrainian Orthodox Church
- United Evangelical Church
- United Presbyterian Church
- United Lutheran Church (consultative)

== Commissions ==
The FCC worked through a number of Commissions which addressed various social issues of the day. These included the Commission on the Church and Social Service which carried out research and education on industrial problems, the Commission on International Justice and Goodwill which stressed "Christian internationalism" and campaigned for the reduction of armaments and the Commission on Councils of Churches which worked on organizing local federations of churches in larger communities so they could be a more effect force in their neighborhoods. Other commissions included the Commission on Negro Churches and Race Relations, Commission on Evangelism, Commission on Education, Commission on Temperance, Commission on Relations with Religious Bodies in Europe and the Commission on Community Relations, which was founded in May 1923, "gives attention neighborhood programme of local churches, the housing of the community work of open churches, the social service work of local federations of Churches and represents the Protestant group in conferences of national social agencies working in communities."

== Sources ==
- Dorrien, Gary J. (2010). Economy, Difference, Empire: Social Ethics for Social Justice. New York: Columbia University Press. ISBN 9780231526296.
- Ahlstrom, Sydney E. (2004). A religious history of the American people (2nd ed.). New Haven, [Conn.]: Yale University Press. ISBN 9780300100129.
- Preuss, Arthur (1924). A Dictionary of Secret and Other Societies. St. Louis: B. Herder Book Co. ISBN 978-1633912625.
- Federal Council Bulletin (5 ed.). Religious Publicity Service of the Federal Council of the Churches of Christ in America. 1920.
- America, Federal Council of the Churches of Christ in (1917). Quadrennial Report (3-5 ed.). The Council.
- Johnson, Sylvester; Weitzman, Steven (2017). The FBI and religion: faith and national security before and after 9/11. Oakland, California: University of California Press. ISBN 978-0520287280.
- Mazenga, Maria (2009). American religious responses to Kristallnacht (1st ed.). New York, NY: Palgrave Macmillan. ISBN 9780230618060.
