= Donald G. Bloesch =

American theologian (1928–2010)

The Reverend Donald G. Bloesch
- Born: Donald George Bloesch; May 3, 1928; Bremen, Indiana, US
- Died: August 24, 2010 (aged 82); Dubuque, Iowa, US
- Spouse: Brenda Jackson (m. 1962)

Ecclesiastical career
- Church: Evangelical and Reformed Church; United Church of Christ
- Ordained: 1953

Academic background
- Education: Elmhurst College; Chicago Theological Seminary (B.D.)
- Alma mater: University of Chicago
- Thesis: Reinhold Niebuhr's Re-Evaluation of the Apologetic Task (1956)
- Influences: Karl Barth; Christoph Blumhardt; John Calvin; Jacques Ellul; Reinhold Niebuhr

Academic work
- Discipline: Theology
- Sub-discipline: Systematic theology
- School or tradition: Evangelicalism; Reformed Christianity
- Institutions: University of Dubuque
- Notable works: Christian Foundations (1992–2006)
- Influenced: Roger E. Olson

Donald George Bloesch (May 3, 1928 – August 24, 2010) was an American evangelical theologian. For more than 40 years, he published scholarly yet accessible works that generally defend traditional Protestant beliefs and practices while seeking to remain in the mainstream of modern Protestant theological thought. His seven-volume Christian Foundations series has brought him recognition as an important American theologian.

His own denomination, in which he was an ordained minister, was the United Church of Christ (UCC). He was raised in the Evangelical and Reformed Church, now merged with the UCC, in which his father and both his grandfathers were also ordained ministers. The "E and R" was a representative of evangelical pietism, a movement that emphasized personal piety, a discerning, educated laity, a reliance on scripture, and an acceptance of the mystical side of Christianity.

== Life ==
Born on May 3, 1928, in Bremen, Indiana, Bloesch received his undergraduate degree from Elmhurst College in Elmhurst, Illinois. He earned his Bachelor of Divinity (BD) at Chicago Theological Seminary in 1953, and his PhD at the University of Chicago in 1956. He did postdoctoral work in Europe at Oxford, Basel, and Tübingen. He served as president of the Midwest Division of the American Theological Society.

From 1957 until his retirement in 1992, Bloesch was a professor of theology at the University of Dubuque Theological Seminary in Dubuque, Iowa, where he continued as a professor emeritus. The seminary's library serves as the repository of his papers.

In 1997, a Festschrift was published in his honor called From East to West: Essays in Honor of Donald G. Bloesch. He died on August 24, 2010.

== Views ==
Bloesch's pietistic background and personal spiritual life lay at the heart of understanding his theology and how Christianity is to continue into the future. In his view, much of American Protestantism has entrenched itself into narrow intellectually based definitions of doctrine which omit, exclude and even prohibit the mystical element as the governing element of the faith (i.e., the action of the Holy Spirit). Much of his critique is in fact directed at his own denomination, the United Church of Christ; he worked with a conservative lobbying group, the Biblical Witness Fellowship, to protest against its more liberal theological and ethical streams.

He characterized himself a "progressive evangelical" or "ecumenical orthodox" criticizing the excesses of both the theological left and right. He often decried the abandonment of traditional values among liberals, but also the ugly, reactionary habits of some conservatives.

== Published works ==
- Systematic Theology:
1. Essentials of Evangelical Theology, Volume 1: God, Authority and Salvation, 1978 ISBN 0-06-060798-X
2. Essentials of Evangelical Theology, Volume 2: Life, Ministry, & Hope, 1984 ISBN 0-06-060799-8
- Christian Foundations series:
1. A Theology of Word & Spirit: Authority & Method in Theology, 1992 ISBN 0-8308-1411-6
2. God the Almighty: Power, Wisdom, Holiness, Love, 1995 ISBN 0-8308-1413-2
3. Jesus Christ: Savior & Lord, 1997 ISBN 0-8308-1414-0
4. The Holy Spirit: Works & Gifts, 2000 ISBN 0-8308-1415-9
5. The Church: Sacraments, Worship, Ministry, Mission, 2002 ISBN 0-8308-1416-7
6. The Last Things: Resurrection, Judgment, Glory, 2004 ISBN 0-8308-1417-5
7. Holy Scripture: Revelation, Inspiration & Interpretation 2006 ISBN 0-8308-1412-4 (cloth), ISBN 0-8308-2752-8 (pbk)
- Theological Notebooks:
1. Theological Notebook: 1960–1964: Spiritual Journals of Donald G. Bloesch, 1989 ISBN 0-939443-12-0
2. Theological Notebook: 1964–1968: Spiritual Journals of Donald G. Bloesch 1991 ISBN 0-939443-13-9
3. Theological Notebook: Volume 3: 1969–1983: The Spiritual Journals of Donald G. Bloesch, 2005 ISBN 1-59752-311-9
- Centers of Christian Renewal, 1964 ISBN 0-06-060799-8
- The Christian Life and Salvation, 1967, 1991 ISBN 0-939443-24-4
- The Christian Witness in a Secular Age: An Evaluation of Nine Contemporary Theologians, 1968, 2002 ISBN 1-57910-854-7
- Christian Spirituality East & West, 1968 (with co-author Jordan Aumann)
- The Crisis of Piety: Essays Towards a Theology of the Christian Life, 1968, 2nd ed., 1988 ISBN 0-939443-05-8
- The Reform of the Church, 1970, 1998 ISBN 978-1-57910-174-9
- The Ground of Certainty: Toward an Evangelical Theology of Revelation 1971, 2002 ISBN 1-57910-877-6
- The Evangelical Renaissance, 1973 ISBN 0-8028-1527-8
- Wellsprings of Renewal: Promise in Christian Communal Life, 1974 ISBN 0-8028-1500-6
- Light a Fire: Gospel Songs for Today, 1975
- Jesus is Victor! Karl Barth's Doctrine of Salvation, 1976 ISBN 0-687-20225-6
- The Invaded Church, 1977
- The Orthodox Evangelicals: Who They Are and What They Are Saying, 1978 (co-editor) ISBN 0-8407-5654-2
- Life, Ministry, and Hope, 1979 ISBN 0-06-060799-8
- Faith & Its Counterfeits, 1981, ISBN 0-87784-822-X
- Is the Bible Sexist?: Beyond Feminism and Patriarchalism, 1982 ISBN 0-89107-243-8
- Crumbling Foundations: Death and Rebirth in an Age of Upheaval, 1984 ISBN 0-310-29821-0
- The Battle for the Trinity: The Debate over Inclusive God-language, 1985 ISBN 0-89283-230-4 Reprint, 2001 ISBN 9781579106928
- Freedom for Obedience: Evangelical Ethics in Contemporary Times , 1987 ISBN 0-06-060804-8
- The Future of Evangelical Christianity: A Call for Unity Amid Diversity, 1988 ISBN 0-939443-10-4
- The Struggle of Prayer, 1988 ISBN 0-939443-04-X
- Reinhold Niebuhr's Re-evaluation of the Apologetic Task (unknown date)
- "Spirituality Old & New", 2007 ISBN 978-0-8308-2838-8

=== Articles and chapters ===
- Bloesch, Donald G. (1968). "Ecumenical Studies". Journal of the American Academy of Religion. 36 (3): 287–289. doi:10.1093/jaarel/XXXVI.3.287.
- ——— (1976). "David F. Wells and John D. Woodbridge, eds., "The Evangelicals" (Book Review)". Christian Scholar's Review. 6 (1): 81. ISSN 0017-2251.
- ——— (1979). "Theological Table-Talk: Crisis in Biblical Authority". Theology Today. 35 (4): 455–462. doi:10.1177/004057367903500411.
- ——— (1983). ""Creation, Science, and Theology" by W. A. White-house and edited by Ann Loades (Book Review)". Zygon. 18 (4): 480. ISSN 0591-2385.
- ——— (1989). "All Israel Will Be Saved: Supersessionism and the Biblical Witness". Interpretation. 43 (2): 130–142. doi:10.1177/002096438904300203.
- ——— (1991). "Law and Gospel in Reformed Perspective". Grace Theological Journal. 12 (1): 179–188.
- ——— (1999). "Book Review: God-Mystery-Diversity: Christian Theology in a Pluralistic World". International Bulletin of Mission Research. 23 (2): 80–81. doi:10.1177/239693939902300211.
- ——— (2002). "A Response To Frank Macchia". Journal of Pentecostal Theology. 10 (2): 18–24. doi:10.1177/096673690201000202.
- ——— (2005). "Karl Barth's Theological Exegesis: The Hermeneutical Principles of the Römerbrief Period". Journal of the Evangelical Theological Society. 48 (4): 858. ISSN 0360-8808.

== Festschriften ==
- Daniel J. Adams, editor, From East to West: Essays in Honor of Donald G. Bloesch, 1997 ISBN 0-7618-0801-9

== Sources ==
- 1996 personal and intellectual biography by colleague Elmer M. Colyer
- A Theology of Word and Spirit: Donald Bloesch's Theological Method
- Inter-Varsity Press bio
- The Boston Collaborative Encyclopedia of Modern Western Theology
- Elmhurst College distinguished alumni
- DTS library, repository for his papers
- Donald G. Bloesch's Obituary in Dubuque's Telegraph Herald
- DONALD G. BLOESCH (1928-2010)
