= Traci D. Blackmon =

American minister

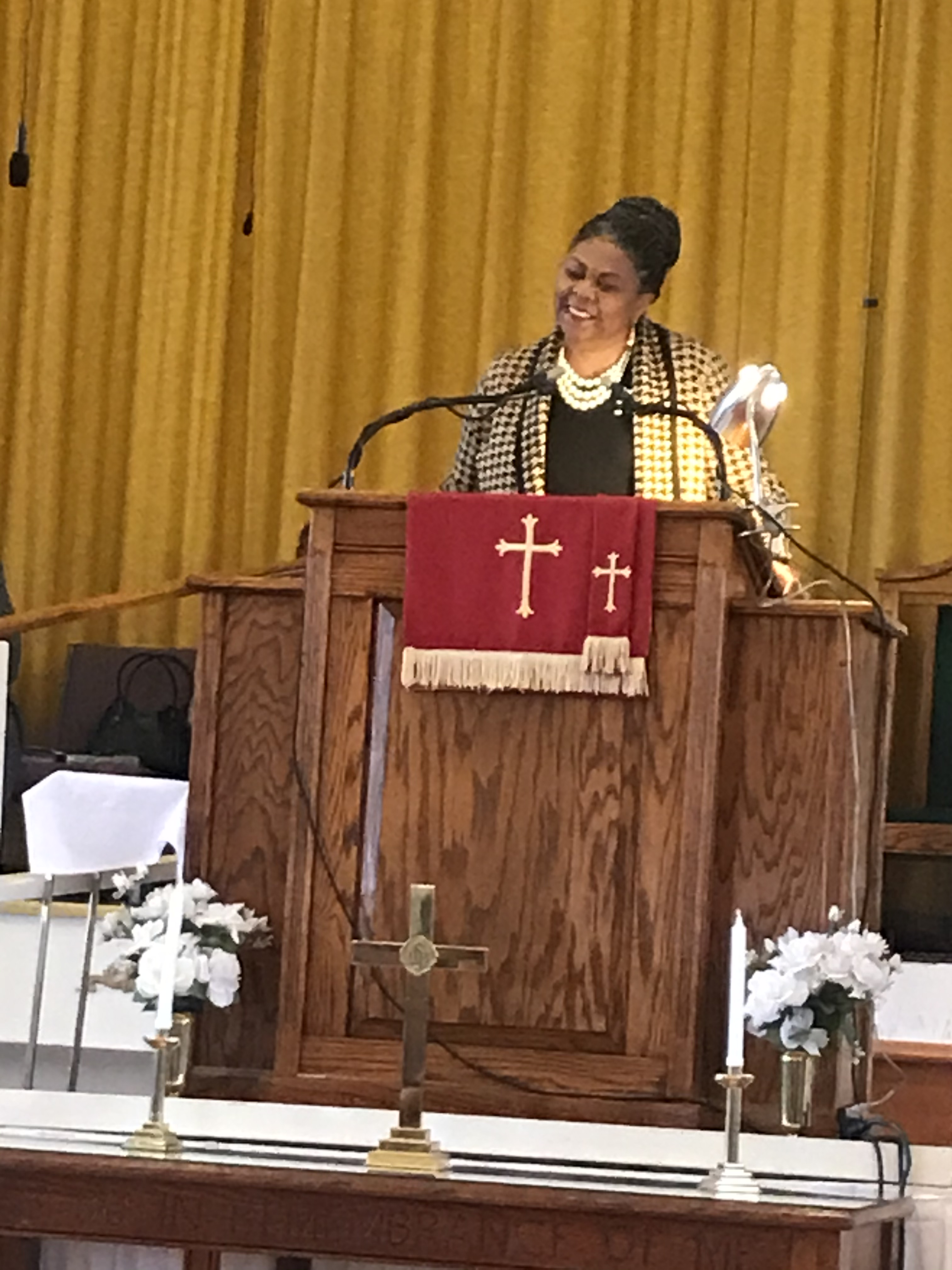
Reverend Traci D. Blackmon

Traci D. Blackmon is an African American minister who was the Associate General Minister of Justice and Local Church Ministries for the United Church of Christ. She resigned her position on December 14, 2023. She resigned after a period of sabbatical citing that her vision and the vision of UCC Leadership no longer aligned. She is the former senior pastor of Christ the King United Church of Christ, Florissant, Missouri and was the, 2023 leading voice of frontline spiritual leaders influential in leading prayer vigils and engaging in peaceful protests during the unrest in Ferguson, Missouri after the Killing of Michael Brown in 2014.

== Life ==
In 1985, Blackmon achieved a Nursing degree from Birmingham-Southern College and a Master of Divinity degree from Eden Theological Seminary in 2009. Identifying as a womanist, Blackmon’s work in Ferguson and St. Louis as clergy and activist led to her participation in the “Unite the Right” rally in Charlottesville, VA along with other clergy and social justice leaders. Blackmon’s community involvement expanded to engagement with several national movements Black Lives Matter and Repairers of the Breach. Blackmon was inducted into the Board of Preachers of Morehouse College. She is a member of Alpha Kappa Alpha and the mother of three adult children.

Blackmon serves on the boards of the Samuel DeWitt Proctor Conference,Chicago Theological Seminary and WomanPreach!

== Ministry and activism ==
Blackmon was ordained in both the African Methodist Episcopal Church and United Church of Christ. Blackmon became the first woman pastor of Christ The King United Church of Christ. The growth of the congregation and the church’s visibility in the community led to an expansion of their outreach ministries. An advocate and participant of interfaith services, Blackmon believes there is an intersection between ministry and activism. In her work as a health care professional, she served to ensure persons with economic and health challenges received the proper care. In like manner, as a pastor she sought to address and assist those marginalized and worked to promote justice for all humanity.

Blackmon first learned of the killing of Michael Brown in 2014 via numerous social media posts. In response, Blackmon used social media to organize the first of many prayer vigils at the police station in Ferguson. The social media hashtag #prayingwithourfeet was used and gained nationwide attention. Blackmon served as a voice of reason, courage and wisdom to the distraught young activist who were in pain and in search of healing. In an article titled, “Marching with God” Blackmon declared ministry and activism go hand in hand. In a call to action, Blackmon took the Black Church to the streets of Ferguson, advocating for social justice as she and other spiritual leaders sought to address police brutality and racial conflict through her appointments to the Ferguson Commission and President Barack Obama’s Advisory Council on Faith-Based Neighborhood Partnerships for the White House.

== Film and media ==
In 2021, Blackmon was featured in the four-part series, “The Black Church: This Is Our Story, This is Our Song," by Henry Louis Gates Jr. on PBS. This series highlighted the history of the Black Church, the culture, women in ministry and leadership roles, struggles of African Americans and how the Black Church nourishes and inspires.

== Awards ==
- 2017 - Person of the Year in St. Louis
- NAACP Rosa Parks Award
- The Urban League of St. Louis Woman in Leadership Award
- The National Planned Parenthood Faith Leader
