= John C. Dorhauer =

- Education: Cardinal Glennon College, Eden Theological Seminary, United Theological Seminary
- Occupation: Minister
- Ordained: United Church of Christ
- Offices held: General Minister and President, Conference Minister

John C. Dorhauer is an American Protestant clergy member, author, and theologian who served as the ninth General Minister and President (GMP) of the United Church of Christ (UCC), a Mainline Protestant denomination, from June 30, 2015, through July 2023.

== Career ==
Dorhauer received a B.A. in Philosophy from Cardinal Glennon College (1983), and an M.Div. from Eden Theological Seminary (1988), the same year that he was ordained in the UCC. He later earned a D.Min degree from United Theological Seminary, (2004) where he studied the effects of white privilege on the Church.

Prior to his election as GMP, Dorhauer served as the Conference Minister of the Southwest Conference, United Church of Christ. He had previously served in the Missouri Mid-South Conference UCC and as the pastor of First Congregational United Church of Christ and Zion United Church of Christ (both of Missouri).

Dorhauer was the first person to conduct a legal same-sex wedding in the state of Arizona when he performed the marriage of David Laurence and Kevin Patterson on October 17, 2014.

== General Minister and President ==
On March 19, 2015, Dorhauer was approved as nominee to serve as UCC General Minister and President. On June 29, 2015, during the 30th General Synod (held in Cleveland, Ohio), Dorhauer's nomination came before the delegates. Numerous delegates at the Synod voiced their concern at how the nomination failed to support minority diversity among leadership in the UCC; many others publicly praised the nomination.

When the vote was called, 85% of the voting delegates approved Dorhauer's election. He replaced the Rev. Dr. Geoffrey Black. Dorhauer was the ninth person to lead the UCC since the denomination was formed in 1957.

He said that there would be two main themes to his tenure: One was to call on the denomination to rethink itself and to consider new ways of “being church” in light of reduced societal interest in institutional religion. The other was the steep decline in the membership of the UCC, like American Christianity, in general, since the 1960s. He said alternatives to institutional churches, what some call the "emergent church," will not immediately supplant but grow alongside the institutional church for a long time. He also called on the UCC to address white privilege.

== Publications ==
- John Dorhauer, Sheldon Culver (2007). Steeplejacking: How the Christian Right is Hijacking Mainstream Religion. Ig Publishing. ISBN 978-0977197286.
- Beyond Resistance: The Institutional Church Meets the Postmodern World. Chicago: Exploration Press. 2015. ISBN 978-0913552742.
