= Staub Memorial Congregational Church =

Church located in Portland, Oregon

Coordinates: 45.514966°N 122.632076°W

- Staub Memorial Congregational Church
- Address: Southeast Portland, Oregon
- Country: United States
- Denomination: Congregationalist

History
- Dedication: J. J. Staub

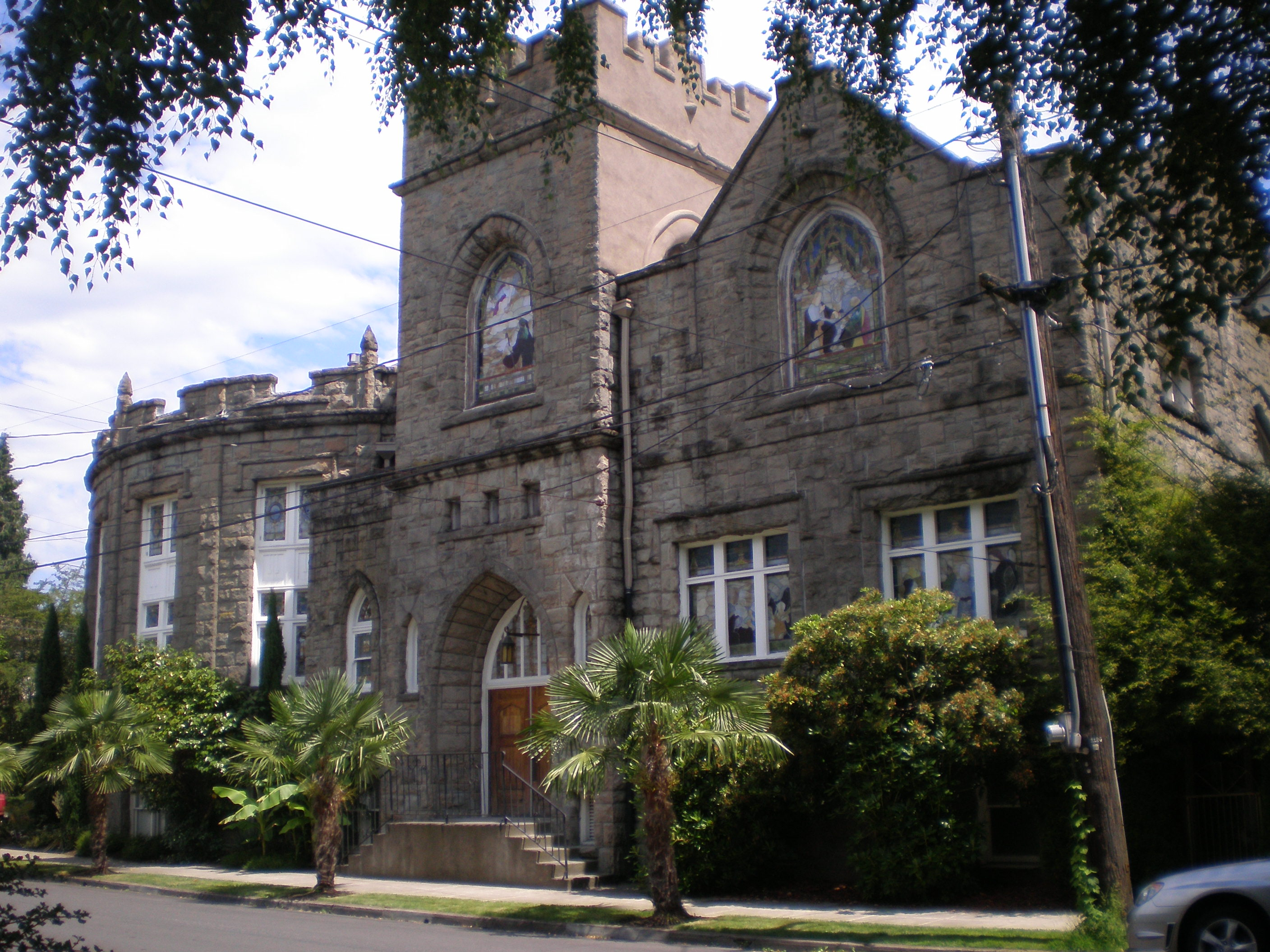
Staub Memorial Congregational Church in 2011

Staub Memorial Congregational Church, also known as Community Bible Fellowship and Sunnyside Congregational Church, is a church located in southeast Portland, Oregon.

In 2011, Mars Hill Church bought the building and announced it would start a Portland congregation there. Controversy ensued due to perceptions that the church may be at odds with Portland's gay community.

== See also ==
- Culture of Portland, Oregon
- Religion in Portland, Oregon
