= Resolutions of the United Church of Christ =

The United Church of Christ is a Christian denomination. Periodically, bodies within the United Church of Christ issue resolutions for various reasons. These statements may or may not be representative of the United Church of Christ. This article documents notable resolutions from the various formal bodies of the United Church of Christ.

== Resolutions about denominational statements ==
The 2001 "Mutual respect within the faith community " General Synod XXIII Resolutions: Mutual respect within the faith community resolution passed by General Synod XXIII "calls upon all levels of the United church of Christ, the national covenanted ministries, conferences, associations, and individual congregations of the denomination to be sensitive to the needs and concerns of a church with such a diverse population and difference of theological beliefs and to identify representatives or groups issuing statements to indicate that they speak only on behalf of themselves or their groups and not on behalf of or for the entire 1.4 million members of the United Church of Christ."

A proposed resolution being submitted by the Faithful and Welcoming Renewal group to General Synod XXVI "seeks to "address the concerns of congregations that may be considering withdrawal from the United Church of Christ by reaffirming our classical and centrist theological heritage and by explicitly including in our extravagant welcome those members and churches considering themselves to be evangelical, conservative, orthodox, or traditional in theological outlook" This resolution "acknowledges the existence of a broad spectrum of thought on contemporary issues of theology and ethics, and advocates fair representation of ECOT and centrist points of view alongside liberal and progressive points of view in all settings of the United Church of Christ, including official gatherings and publications" and "calls upon all settings of the church to consider prayerfully its policies and statements in terms of their impact on the unity and future of local churches, associations, and conferences in the UCC."

== General Synod resolutions ==
The denomination's churchwide deliberative body is the General Synod, which meets every two years. The General Synod is composed of delegates elected from the Conferences (distributed proportionally by conference size) together with the boards of directors of each of the four covenanted ministries (see below, under National Offices).

While General Synod provides the most visible voice of the "stance of the denomination" on any particular issue, the covenantal polity of the denomination means that General Synod speaks to local churches, associations, and conferences, but not for them. Thus, the other settings of the church are always allowed to hold differing views and practices on all non-constitutional matters.

General Synod considers three kinds of resolutions:

- Pronouncements: A Pronouncement is a statement of Christian conviction on a matter of moral or social principle and has been adopted by a two-thirds vote of a General Synod.
- Proposals for Action: A Proposal for Action is a recommendation for specific directional statements and goals implementing a Pronouncement. A Proposal for Action normally accompanies a Pronouncement. (See link above regarding Pronouncements.)
- Resolutions and Other Formal Motions Which may consist of the following three types:
  - Resolutions of Witness: A Resolution of Witness is an expression of the General Synod concerning a moral, ethical, or religious matter confronting the church, the nation, or the world, adopted for the guidance of the officers, Associated, or Affiliated Ministries, or other bodies as defined in Article VI of the Bylaws of the United Church of Christ; the consideration of local churches, Associations, Conferences, and other bodies related to the United Church of Christ; and for a Christian witness to the world. It represents agreement by at least two-thirds of the delegates voting that the view expressed is based on Christian conviction and is a part of their witness to Jesus Christ.
  - Prudential Resolutions: A Prudential Resolution establishes policy, institutes or revises structure or procedures, authorizes programs, approves directions, or requests actions by a majority vote.
  - Other Formal Motions

== 2015 - Thirtieth General Synod held in Cleveland, Ohio ==
Minutes

- Full Communion Relationship Between the United Church of Christ and the United Church of Canada
- Commemorating 100 Years Since the Armenian genocide
- Resolution Urging Socially Responsible Investment Practices:
- Resolution to Change the Racially Demeaning Name, Mascot and Imagery of the Washington National Football League Team: General Synod Archive
- Resolution Marking the Thirtieth Anniversary of the Just Peace Pronouncement by Recommitting Ourselves to be a Just Peace Church:
- Developing Welcoming, Inclusive, Supportive and Engaged Congregations for Mental Health:
- A Just and Compassionate Response in the Wake of the Shootings at Emanuel A.M.E. Church in Charleston, South Carolina: this resolution also called for the removal of the Confederate battle flag from the South Carolina State Capitol.
- Dismantling Discriminatory Systems of Mass Incarceration in the United States:
- Dismantling the New Jim Crow:
- A Call for Peace, Justice and Reunification in the Korean Peninsula:
- A Call for the United Church of Christ to Take Actions Toward a Just Peace in the Israeli-Palestinian Conflict: this resolution endorsed Kairos Palestine and the Boycott, Divestment and Sanctions movement, proving globally controversial and provoking negative responses from the Israeli government and media.
- Responsible Stewardship of the Outer Space Environment:
- Reaffirming Our Commitment to Full Equality for Persons of Any Sexual Orientation, Gender Identity of Gender Expression:
- Transition from Fossil Fuels to Renewable Energy:

== 2013 - Twenty-ninth General Synod held in Long Beach, California ==
- Calling for the United Church of Christ to Repudiate the Doctrine of Discovery Which Authorized the Genocide of Native People and the Theft of Native Lands:
- Resolution Supporting Compassionate Comprehensive Immigration Reform and the Protection of the Human Rights of Immigrants:
- To Recognize the Need for Compassionate Care and Healing to Our Veterans:
- A Resolution on Ecumenical Relationship Between the United Church of Christ and the United Church of Canada:
- Restructure of Conference Boundaries:
- Resolution Urging Divestment - Along With Other Strategies - from Fossil Fuel Companies to Address Climate Change :
- On Making UCC Church Buildings More Carbon-Neutral:
- Resisting Actions Seeking to Undermine the Status of Women in Society: this resolution not only called for gender equality within the UCC but also endorsed equal pay for equal work, women's reproductive rights, Title X, and the work of Planned Parenthood.
- Calling for an All Church Offering for Supporting the Educational Expenses of Members in Discernment Preparing for Authorized Ministry of the United Church of Christ:
- A Resolution in Support of Outdoor Ministries of the United Church of Christ:
- The United Samoan Ministries of the United Church of Christ Request to be Recognized as a Historically Underrepresented Group and Member of the Council for Racial and Ethnic Ministries:
- Resolution Against Bullying and Discrimination:
- Resolution on Advocating for Funding to Construct Quality Affordable Housing:
- Advocating for Tax Reform as Christian Stewardship and Public Duty: This resolution endorsed several left-liberal tax reform policies and the creation of a more "progressive, fair, neutral, adequate, and redistributive" tax system.
- A Call to Respond to Violence and Human Rights Violations in Honduras Resulting from Illegal Drug Trafficking and Drug Policy in the United States:
- Mountaintop Removal Coal Mining in Appalachia: This resolution endorsed action to bring an end to controversial mountaintop removal mining.

== 2011 - Twenty-eighth General Synod held in Tampa, Florida ==
- Common Agreement on Mutual Recognition of Baptism: An interdenominational agreement with the Roman Catholic church regarding the rite of baptism.
- A Call for a Reflection and Advocacy on Behalf of the Democratic Republic of Congo: This resolution called for solidarity and advocacy for "Congolese security and sovereignty" from multinational corporations and neighboring states that have hindered democratic advancements and the work of UCC ecumenical partners in the region.
- In Support of the Release of Puerto Rican Political Prisoners: This resolution identifies Oscar López Rivera and Avelino González-Claudio as political prisoners and advocates for their release.
- A Covenant for Church Youth Ministries:
- Putting Our Money Where Our Values Are: Evaluating Church Financial Relationships: This resolution asks that all levels of the UCC only relate with financial institutions if they "have records of fair lending, business and investing practices."
- Affirming Healthcare Coverage for UCC Authorized Ministers and Their Families
- The Right of LBGT Parents to Adopt and Raise Children: This resolution endorses the non-consideration of sexual orientation, gender identity, or gender expression in evaluating potential adoptive parents.
- U.S. Ratification of the Comprehensive Nuclear Test Ban Treaty:
- Supporting International Human Rights Related to Sexual Orientation and Gender Identity:
- On Actions of Hostility Against Islam and the Muslim Community:
- Resolution for Mindful and Faithful Eating: This resolution calls for UCC members and settings to consider concerns of ecology, animal welfare, and "the needs and concerns of workers" in making dietary decisions.
- A Resolution to Form a Theological Forum: In this resolution, submitted by delegates from the Synod floor, the Synod requested a forum "to engage the widest possible diversity of perspectives within the United Church of Christ" in "theological reflection and dialogue."

== 2009 - Twenty-seventh General Synod held in Grand Rapids, Michigan ==
- On the Situation of Iraqi Refugees and Internally Displaced
- Affirmation of Partnership with the Protestant Church in East Timor
- Call to Reaffirm the Importance of Ecumenical Commitments and Initiatives in the UCC
- Calling on President Barack Obama to Revisit and Re-negotiate a More Humane, Democratic, and Ecologically Sound Version of the North American Free Trade Agreement:
- A Call to Awareness and Action to End the Practice of Trafficking in Persons:
- An Urgent Call For Advocacy in Support of Healthcare For All, as in H.R. 676:
- Toward Unified Governance for the National Setting of the United Church of Christ:
- An Economic Justice Covenant: This resolution calls upon churches to prioritize fighting economic inequality and working with social justice organizations.
- A Call To Be Global Mission Churches in the United Church of Christ:
- A Call for Study of Our Church's Involvement in the Eugenics Movement:
- Calling For Comprehensive HIV Prevention in Church and Community:
- Affirming the Accra Confession: Covenanting for Justice in the Economy and the Earth: This resolution endorsed the view, taken by the World Alliance of Reformed Churches (which included the UCC) at its 2004 assembly in Accra, Ghana, that "neoliberal economic globalization" is a system that "impoverish[es] and oppress[es] people around the world and in the U.S." and must be replaced by systems "more in line with God's vision for God's world."
- Roles of Church and Government in Addressing the Global Food Crisis: This resolution lays out "ways in which our consumerism leads to food insecurity," and calls for study and advocacy on how to make the global food system more just and equitable.
- Solidarity and Friendship with Iran: This resolution addresses the 2009 Iranian presidential election protests, declaring "solidarity with the people of Iran" and calling for the government of Iran to cease its "violence, repression, and bloodshed" against demonstrators and others.
- Responsible Meeting Practice: This resolution calls upon UCC churches to live the principles of "creation care and social justice" in how meetings are organized.
- Ministering to Those Struggling and Suffering in the Troubled Economy:
- Affirming Diversity/Multi-Cultural Education in the Public Schools:

== 2005 - Twenty-fifth General Synod XXV held in Atlanta, Georgia ==
General Synod 25 Minutes Home

Note: The numbered links to resolutions, are to resolutions as proposed. The links to "Minutes" are the links to the official GS 25 Minutes, which document reports the resolutions as passed. Direct links to pages within the GS 25 minutes file do not work with some combinations of versions of Microsoft Internet Explorer and Adobe Reader.

- Promoting peace for all in the Sudan.HomeMinutes Page 19
- Hope in a Time of Terror Minutes Minutes Page 21
- In support of fair and just compensation for lay employees of the UCC.HomeMinutes Page 22
- Reaffirming Jesus Christ as our Lord and Savior and reaffirming our historic UCC cross, crown and orb with motto logo.HomeHomeHomeMinutes Page 23
- In support of ministries to our campuses of higher education.HomeMinutes Page 24
- In Support of Equal Marriage Rights for All.HomeHomeMinutes Page 27(discussion)Minutes Page 30(resolution)
- Marriage is between one man and one woman. (Defeated)HomeMinutes Page 33(discussion)
- Another world is possible: A peace with justice movement in the UCC. HomeMinutes Page 33
- In support of making fast food fair food: The next Step. HomeMinutes Page 34
- Calling on the UCC to declare itself to be a "fair trade" denomination.HomeMinutes Page 35
- Called to Wholeness in Christ: Becoming an accessible to all church.HomeMinutes Page 38
- Saving Social Security from privatization.HomeMinutes Page 39
- Supreme Court Justice nomination.HomeMinutes Page 40
- For the Common Good.HomeMinutes Page 40
- Resolution to advance the cause of the most disadvantaged in the budgetary and appropriations process.HomeMinutes Page 42
- Concerning use of economic leverage in promoting peace in the Middle East.HomeHomeMinutes Page 43 (discussion)Minutes Page 44 (resolution)
- Proposed Changes to the By-Laws.Minutes Page 45
- Adoption of the Budget.Minutes Page 53
- Pronouncement: Ministry Issues: Forming and preparing pastoral leaders for God's Church.Minutes Page 54 (discussion)Minutes Page 55 (resolution)
- Report and Recommendation of the General Synod Form and Function Committee.Minutes Page 56
- Investigations into human rights violations in the Philippines.HomeMinutes Page 57
- Religious freedom for Native Hawaiian prisoners.HomeMinutes Page 58 (discussion)Minutes Page 59 (resolution)
- A Call for truth-telling and standards of ethics in public life. HomeMinutes Page 60
- United Church of Christ Support for the International Criminal Court.HomeMinutes Page 62
- Tear down the wall.HomeMinutes Page 63 (discussion)
- A call for environmental education and action.HomeMinutes Page 13 (discussion)
- Supporting congregations and providing guidance for stewardship of God's creation during the coming period of declining fossil fuels.HomeMinutes Page 13 (discussion)
- Establishing representative and senatorial Synods. (Referred to Executive Council for study)HomeMinutes Page 57

== 2003 - Twenty-fourth General Synod XXIV held in Minneapolis, Minnesota ==
- A RESOLUTION AFFIRMING THE ESSENTIAL ROLE OF COMMISSIONED MINISTRY AS AN AUTHORIZED MINISTRY OF THE UNITED CHURCH OF CHRIST

== 2001 - General Synod 23 held in Kansas City, Missouri ==
Minutes

- Mutual respect within the faith community General Synod XXIII Resolutions: Mutual respect within the faith community
- To end the presence of the United States Navy in the municipality of Vieques, Puerto Rico
- Resolution on conflict diamonds in Sierra Leone
- Call for study on reparations for slavery
- Reaffirming the Trinitarian basis of our ecumenism
- Program for essential conference ministry
- Preservation of the Mandan, Hidatsa, and Arickara languages of the three affiliated tribes
- Pension supplementation for Native American ordained and licensed ministers
- Pastoral compensation ("To address compensatory disparities existing among American Indian clergy and non-native clergy serving congregations in the United Church of Christ") Response to resolution: Pastoral compensation
- Resolution on juvenile justice
- Health effects and impacts of tobacco on children, teenagers, and their families
- The epidemic of Acquired Immune Deficiency Syndrome on the continent of Africa
- Colombia ( "The purpose of this resolution is to help our conferences become more aware of the situation in Colombia and give concrete suggestions for how to respond to crisis.")
- Calling upon the United Church of Christ to initiate a jubilee for justice for rural America
- Calling for a more just, humane direction for economic globalization
- Access to excellent public schools: a child's civil right in the 21st century
- Calling on the United Church of Christ to join the Decade to Overcome Violence
- Anti-Semitism ("This resolution calls on the Twenty-third General Synod of the United Church of Christ to face the problem of anti-Semitism, to help the congregations become aware of the problem of anti-Semitism, and to address the issue through both education and concrete actions")
- Redistributing tax rebates to the poor
- A Statement on Convergence in Matters of Theology and Practice between the Alliance of Baptists and the United Church of Christ
- Recommendation to the churches for a new partnership, Churches Uniting in Christ, Consultation on Church Union
- A pronouncement on a United Church of Christ ministry and witness with Micronesians
- Support for federally funded research on embryonic stem cells
- [In support of the coalition of Immokalee workers boycott of Taco Bell]
- “Christian Response to Development in Genetic Technology”

== 1999 - Twenty-second General Synod XXII held in Providence, Rhode Island ==
- CALLING THE PEOPLE OF GOD TO JUSTICE FOR PERSONS WITH SERIOUS MENTAL ILLNESSES (BRAIN DISORDERS) page 10
- "Bringing Justice and Peace to The Middle East"
- “Christian Faith, Economic Life and Justice"
- “Licensed and Ordained Ministries in the United Church of Christ.”
- "PARTNERSHIP IN MISSION AND MINISTRY BETWEEN THE CONGREGATIONAL CHRISTIAN CHURCH IN AMERICAN SAMOA AND THE UNITED CHURCH OF CHRIST
- "PREVENTION OF LESBIAN, GAY, BISEXUAL, AND TRANSGENDER YOUTH SUICIDE"

== 1997 - Twenty-first General Synod XXI held in Columbus, Ohio ==
- Renewed by God's Spirit: Affirming God's Presence and Power in the Life of the United Church of Christ
- Jerusalem: City of Life
- "Palestine/Israel"
- "Jerusalem city of life"
- RECLAIMING THE CHURCH’S MINISTRY OF HEALTH AND HEALING
- RESOLUTION "FULL COMMUNION WITH THE EVANGELICAL LUTHERAN CHURCH IN AMERICA, THE PRESBYTERIAN CHURCH (USA), AND THE REFORMED CHURCH IN AMERICA"
- "Affirming democratic principles in an emerging global economy"
- "FIDELITY AND INTEGRITY IN ALL COVENANTED RELATIONSHIPS"
- Reclaiming The Role of Pastor as Teacher adopted but not funded.

It was recommended that the Office for Church Life and Leadership along with Conference and Association Church and Ministry Committees; 1. emphasize that the call to Ordained Ministry includes a call to teach as well as to pastor and 2. develop clearer guidelines on how this calling to teach informs expectations in the training and standing of Pastors;

== 1995 - Twentieth General Synod XX ==
- Resolution “on the need for educating members of the United Church of Christ about the principle of separation of church and state”
- "Ethical Guidelines for Labor Relations for United Church of Christ Organizations and Related Organizations "
- "United Church of Christ Response to "Churches in Covenant Communion" and Proposed Recommended Action." (Churches in Covenant Communion is a proposal for the nine member churches of the Consultation on Church Union to share their common life as The Church of Christ Uniting.)

== 1993 - Nineteenth General Synod XIX ==
- "Urging reopening of East Jerusalem"
- "Calling the UCC to Become a Multiracial and Multicultural Church."

== 1991 - Eighteenth General Synod XVIII held in Norfolk, Virginia ==
- Reaffirming Universal Health Care Y2K

- Recognizing the Rights of Native Hawaiians to Self-Determination and Self-Governance
- “Support of Quality, Integrated Education for All Children in Public Schools”
- 91-GS-44 VOTED: The Eighteenth General Synod adopts the Resolution, “The Rights and Responsibilities of Christians Regarding Human Death.” pp. 46-47.
- "CONCERNING THE CHURCH AND THE AMERICANS WITH DISABILITIES ACT (ADA) OF 1991 "

== 1989 - Seventeenth General Synod XVII ==
- Pronouncement and Proposal for Action: “The Church and Genetic Engineering”
- “Challenging the Resurgence of Racism in the United States of America”
- “Resolution on Support for the Peace Process in Central America”

== 1987 - Sixteenth General Synod XVI ==
- “The Church and Genetic Engineering”
- "The Israeli-Palestine Conflict"
- "The Relationship Between the United Church of Christ & the Jewish Community "
- "A pronouncement A united church of Christ Ministry with Indians"

== 1983 - Fourteenth General Synod ==
- Concern about the Moral and Ethical Implications of Genetic Engineering

== 1981 - Thirteenth General Synod ==
- RESOLUTION: TOWARD A COVENANT IN MISSION AND FAITH: THE UNITED CHURCH OF CHRIST AND THE EVANGELICAL CHURCH OF THE UNION, GERMAN DEMOCRATIC REPUBLIC AND FEDERAL REPUBLIC OF GERMANY (Kirchengemeinschaft )
- Resolution on Racial Justice

== 1977 - Eleventh General Synod ==
- “The Right to Earn a Living”,
- “Civil Liberties Without Discrimination Based on Affectional or Sexual Preference
- RECOMMENDATIONS IN REGARD TO THE HUMAN SEXUALITY STUDY (Reception of the Human Sexuality Task Force Report -- this vote (490 Yes; 210 No) spurred the formation of the United Church People for Biblical Witness, later to become the Biblical Witness Fellowship.

== 1975 - Tenth General Synod ==
- "The Pacific and Asian American Ministries
- RESOLUTION ON HUMAN SEXUALITY AND THE NEEDS OF GAY AND BISEXUAL PERSONS -- "The Tenth Synod requests the Executive Council to commission a study concerning the dynamics of human sexuality and the theological basis for a Christian ethic concerning human sexuality, and to recommend postures for the church, to be presented to the Eleventh General Synod."

== 1973 - Ninth General Synod held in St. Louis, Missouri ==
- "Ecumenical Stance of the United Church of Christ" (conciliar movement)
- 73-GS-36 VOTED: The General Synod adopts as amended the statement on “The Rights and Responsibilities of Christians Regarding Human Death.”

pp. 42-43 of minutes

== 1971 - Eighth General Synod ==
- declaration of commitment to improving the criminal justice system so that prisons become primarily institutions or training and rehabilitation of the inmates, 1971.

== 1969 - Seventh General Synod ==
- “demand for law and order be combined with a demand for justice"

== 1967 - Sixth General Synod held in Cincinnati, Ohio ==
- Resolution on The Middle East situation
- "Resolution to Abolish Capital Punishment"

== 1965 - Fifth General Synod ==
- Establishment of an Audio Visual Fund
- Appointment of Committee on Structure
- Adoption of Report on Integrated Quality Education
- Adoption of Report on Ecumenism & On Commission on Racial Unity
- Recommendation for Continuing Racial Justice Now

== 1963 - Fourth General Synod ==
In 1963, the 4th General Synod called upon the United Church of Christ to be "radically committed" to "uproot intolerance, bigotry, and prejudice within our own living and to replace them with goodwill and the determination to strike down immediately the barriers which divide [people] on account of race.

== 1961 - Third General Synod ==
The Constitution of the United Church of Christ was declared in force by the Third General Synod on July 4, 1961 . The Bylaws were also adopted by the Third General Synod
