= Biblical Witness Fellowship =

Biblical Witness Fellowship is an evangelical renewal movement composed of members of the United Church of Christ. Founded in 1978 as the United Church People for Biblical Witness, the movement reorganized as the Biblical Witness Fellowship at a national convocation in Byfield, Massachusetts in 1984, hosted by the current president of BWF, William Boylan.

The primary purpose of BWF is "to renew spiritual vitality through faith in Jesus Christ in every local congregation, restoring commitment to the original call and vision of these churches and their denomination." The BWF holds that congregations of the United Church of Christ have been in numerical and spiritual decline, citing denominational statistics that report net losses of members and congregations in every year since 1963.

BWF has consistently voiced its criticism of UCC statements regarding things they believe to be contrary to the Bible, especially on social issues. Several of these statements have included the "Open and Affirming" resolution of 1985, and the 2005 "Equal Marriage Rights For All" resolution. The BWF is anti-abortion, and believes the affirmation of marriage as between one man and woman only. Its primary focus, however, has been the renewal of the local church and the ecumenical unity of the mainline churches. David Runnion-Bareford served as executive director and a primary spokesperson for the evangelical minority in the UCC from 1994 - 2010.

== Beginnings of BWF ==
The impetus for the birth of Biblical Witness Fellowship was a human sexuality report accepted by the General Synod in 1977. Since that time the BWF has consistently voiced its criticism of UCC statements supporting beliefs and behaviors that reflect the views of the culture rather than the teachings of the Bible.

Members of the BWF affirm a statement of Christian faith known as the "Dubuque Declaration" (named for the Iowa city and theological seminary where it was drafted), as well as affirming the historic creeds and statements of the Protestant Reformation. The movement and its supporters declare that the name reflects its high regard for the authority of Scripture on matters of faith and morals. The Dubuque Declaration was drafted in large measure by UCC (Evangelical and Reformed-heritage) theologian Donald Bloesch.

In 1984, the BWF decided to expand from its original emphasis on protesting national policy stands to offering alternatives to the UCC system for its member congregations, such as support for the training of evangelical (e.g., non-liberal) pastors and endorsement of international mission work, a field in which it criticizes the present Wider Church Ministries of the UCC as having abandoned entirely, or augmented with unacceptable political activity. This latter activity comes under the umbrella of the Missions Renewal Network, which connects local congregations with missionaries and mission projects rooted in their common history and tradition. The MRN has networked over 100 missionaries with local churches since its creation.

== Organizations founded ==
Biblical Witness Fellowship is also a founding member of the Association For Church Renewal, a coalition of the leadership of numerous renewal agitating for change within most "mainline" Protestant denominations; thus, the BWF has similar characteristics to renewal groups in other Protestant denominations such as the Episcopal Church and the Presbyterian Church (USA). Runnion-Bareford served as President of the Association from 2006 - 2011.

== Resolutions Presented ==
The renewal movement has presented seven resolutions to recent General Synods, four of which have been successfully passed in amended form. These include:

- "Affirming the Cross Triumphant and the Lordship of Jesus Christ" (2005)
- "Mutual Respect Within the Faith Community" (2001)
- "Affirming and Strengthening Marriage" (1999)
- "Standing in Solidarity with the Persecuted Church" (1999)

== Controversies ==
Some leaders within the UCC have attempted to discredit BWF and other renewal groups by alleging that they are not sincere grassroots movements of conviction, but rather front groups for a politically motivated conspiracy involving the Institute for Religion and Democracy. However, the BWF has published a documented rebuttal of the charges made by UCC President John Thomas and other UCC leaders, asserting that its founding and continued activities have been buttressed solely by ordinary clergy and laypeople of the UCC and not by external interests.

== Withdrawals ==
Numerous congregations, some affiliated with the BWF, have decided, since the 2005 Synod marriage resolution, to leave the UCC altogether. This accelerates a trend that has seen a rising number of congregations leave the denomination since 1991; some of these have joined groups such as the Conservative Congregational Christian Conference or the Evangelical Association of Reformed and Congregational Christian Churches. New congregations, however, have been attracted to the renewal movements during this period as well. The BWF points as evidence to the soundness of its position to a study done by the Hartford Seminary Foundation that found approximately 26% of the membership of the UCC share the evangelical convictions expressed by BWF.
