= First Protestant Church =

Historic church in Texas, United States

- U.S. National Register of Historic Places
- Recorded Texas Historic Landmark
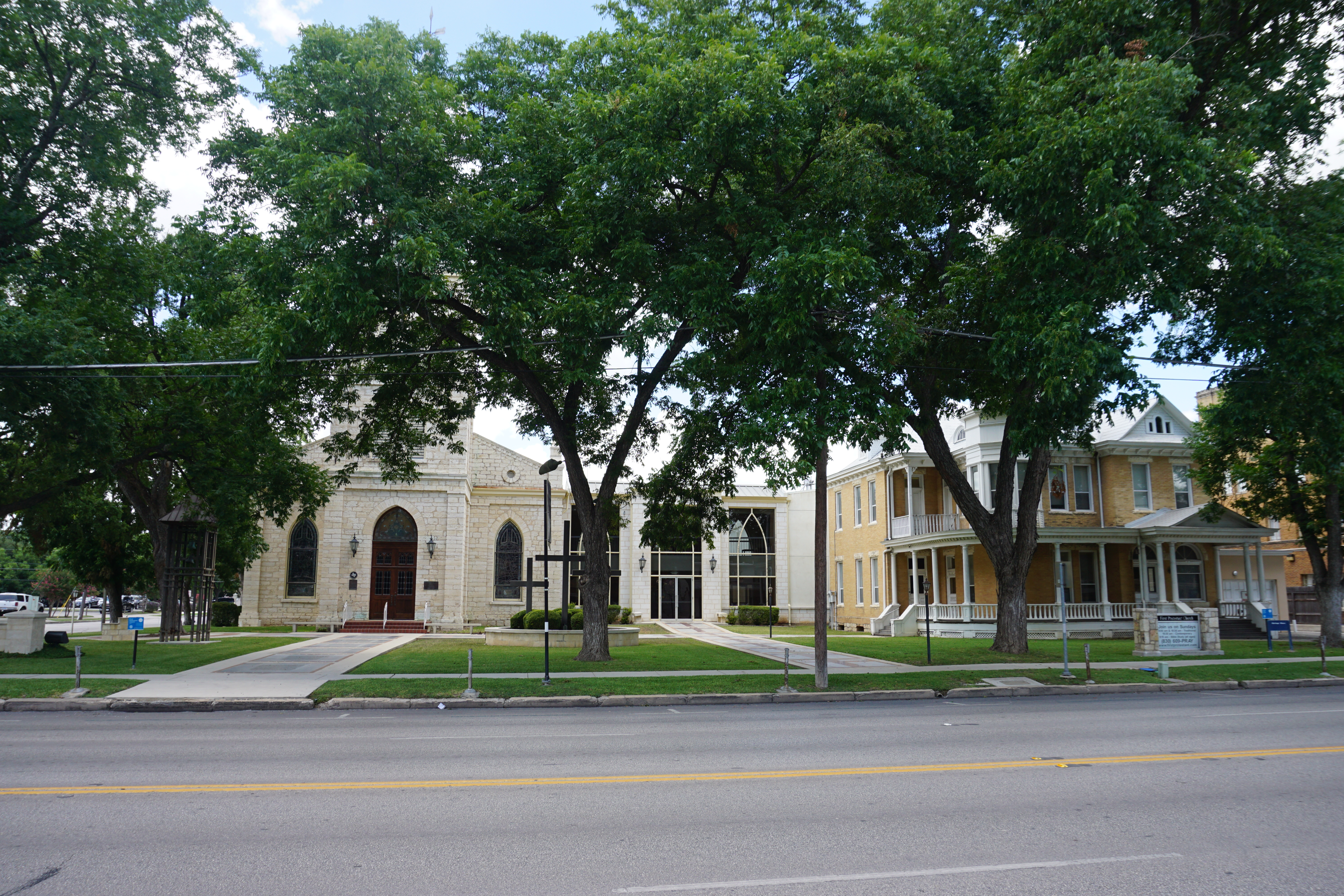
- First Protestant Church in 2017

- Location within Texas Location within the United States
- Location: 296 S. Seguin St., New Braunfels, Texas
- Coordinates: 29°42′3″N 98°7′21″W
- Area: 0.2 acres (0.081 ha)
- Built: 1875
- Architectural style: Gothic
- NRHP reference No.: 71000926
- RTHL No.: 1857

Significant dates
- Added to NRHP: July 14, 1971
- Designated RTHL: 1967

First Protestant Church is a historic church at the corner of Seguin and W Coll Streets in New Braunfels, Texas.

It was built in 1875 and added to the National Register of Historic Places in 1971.

== See also ==
- National Register of Historic Places listings in Comal County, Texas
- Recorded Texas Historic Landmarks in Comal County
