= Evangelical Synod of North America =

Former protestant denomination in the United States

- Evangelische Synode von Nord-Amerika
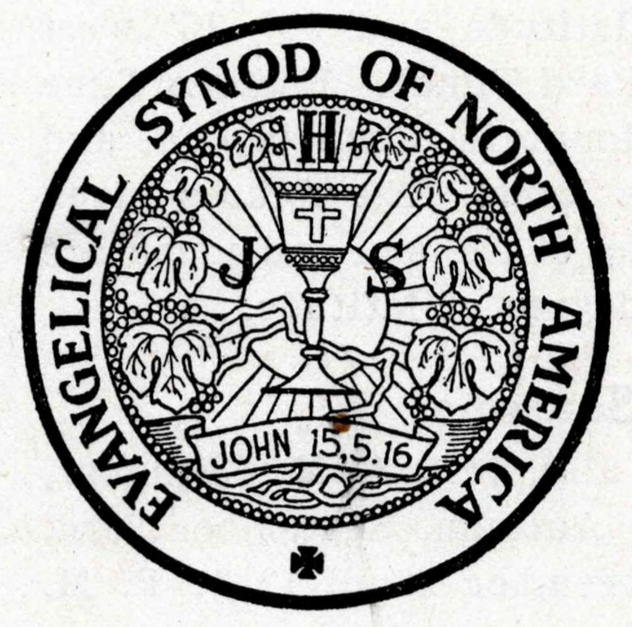
- Abbreviation: ESNA
- Orientation: United Protestant (Lutheran and Reformed)
- Associations: Federal Council of Churches
- Region: Eastern, Midwestern and Southern United States
- Origin: 1872
- Merger of: Evangelical Synod of the West, German Evangelical Synod of the East & German Evangelical Synod of the Northwest
- Merged into: Evangelical and Reformed Church
- Defunct: 1934
- Seminaries: Eden Theological Seminary

The Evangelical Synod of North America (ESNA), before 1927 German Evangelical Synod of North America (German: (Deutsche) Evangelische Synode von Nord-Amerika), was a Protestant Christian denomination in the United States existing from the mid-19th century until its 1934 merger with the Reformed Church in the United States to form the Evangelical and Reformed Church. This church merged with the Congregational Christian Churches in 1957 to create the United Church of Christ.

== Beliefs ==
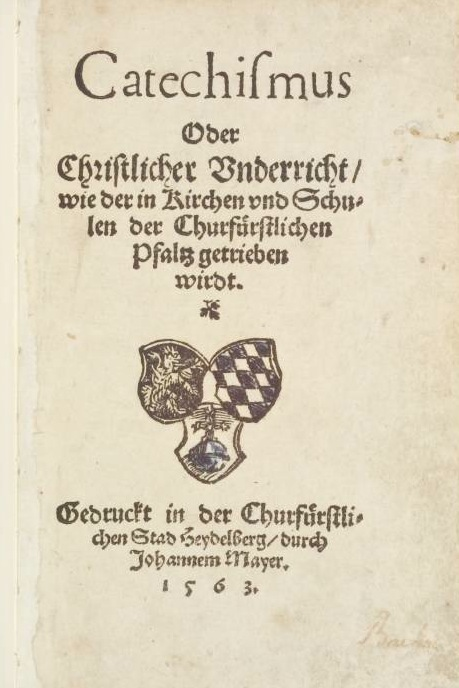
The Heidelberg Catechism (Reformed)

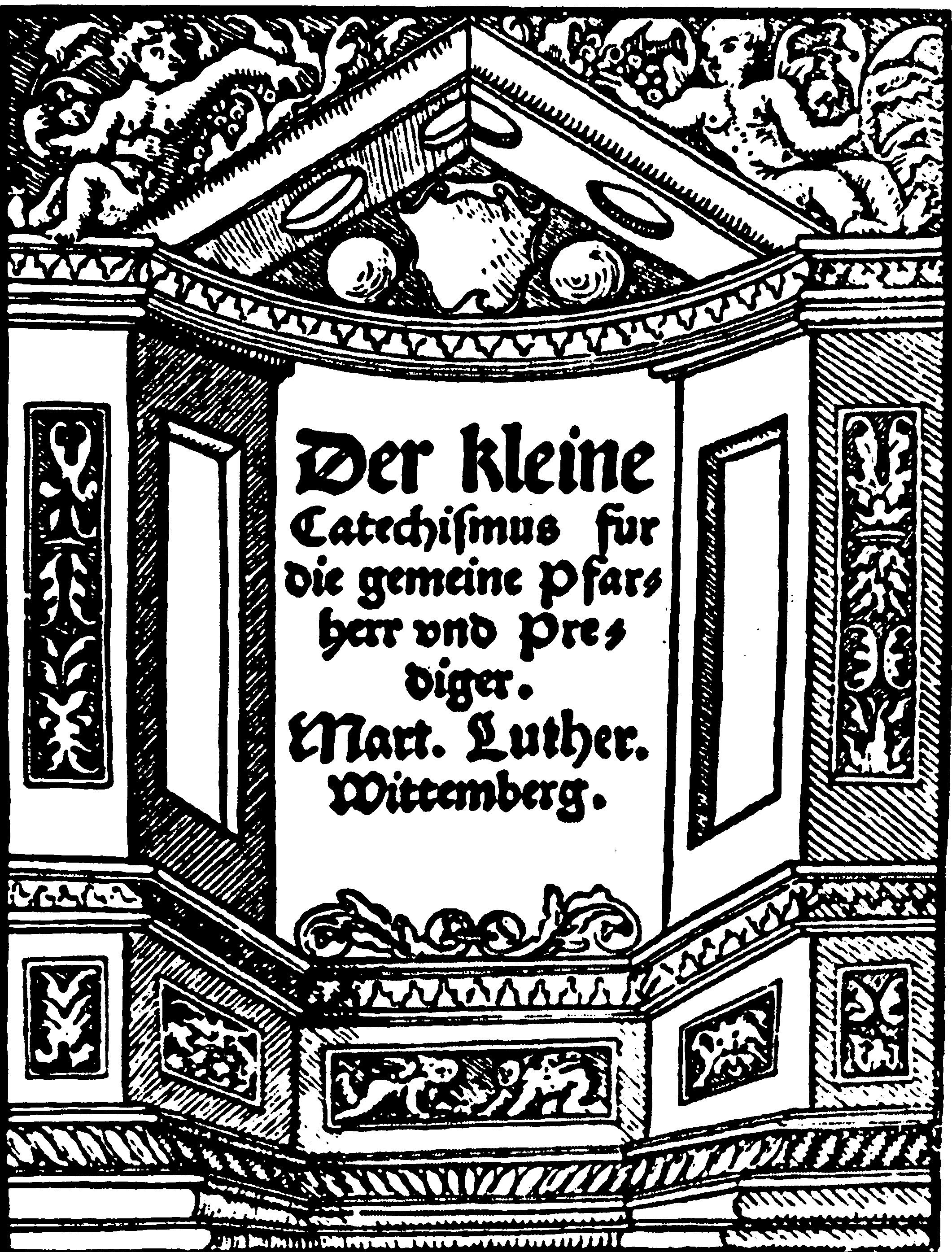
The Small Catechism (Lutheran)

The ESNA allowed for liberty pertaining to disagreements between these two catechisms.

Centered in the Midwestern United States, the denomination was made of German Protestant congregations of mixed Lutheran and Reformed heritage, reflecting the 1817 union of those traditions in Prussia (and other areas of Germany). This union, both in Germany and in the United States, was deeply influenced by the pietist movement that was a reaction against centuries of scholasticism in Lutheran circles. The denomination accepted the Heidelberg Catechism of the Reformed and Luther's Small Catechism and Augsburg Confession of the Lutherans as its confessional documents; where there was disagreement among the three, the individual believer had freedom to believe either tradition.

Generally speaking, in practice, ESNA clergy held to Calvinist views on baptism and Holy Communion (with a consequent de-emphasis upon European-style liturgy), while espousing Lutheran teachings such as justification by faith and the belief that law and gospel should be perceived differently, doctrines muted or even rejected in some other expressions of Calvinism throughout Europe and the U.S. The church eventually developed its own Evangelical Catechism, reflecting its "united" faith. In keeping with core Protestant convictions, the Bible was considered the ultimate standard of its faith.

== History ==
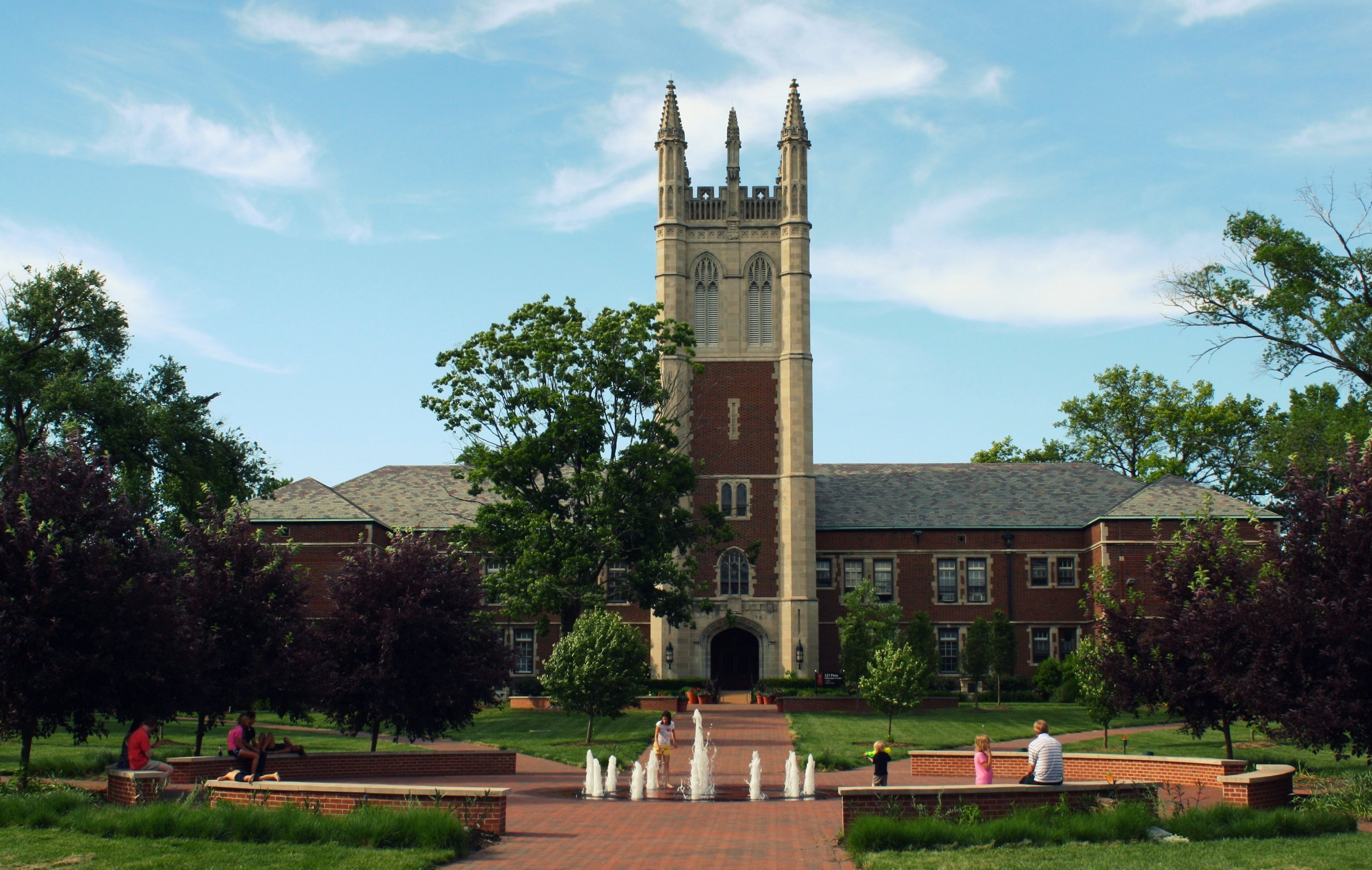
Eden Seminary, founded for the education of ESNA ministers; image from 2009

The German Evangelical Church Society of the West (Der Deutsche Evangelische Kirchenverein des Westens) was founded on October 15, 1840, at Deutsche Evangelische St. Johannes Gemeinde Zu Gravois Settlement Missouri. St. Johns Evangelical United Church of Christ (as it is known today) had been founded in 1838 by newly arrived German immigrants. They were living in a wilderness farming community a day's journey south of St. Louis. The small congregation built a church out of logs by hand on a hill. A memorial was erected in 1925 commemorating the founding of the Evangelical Synod of North America and stands today in front of the church.

At the 1866 General Convention in Indianapolis, Indiana, the name Evangelical Synod of the West was adopted. In 1868, the governance was changed to one in which delegates to the convention were elected by district. Previously, the full membership attended each convention.

In 1872, the synod merged with the German Evangelical Synod of the East (covering western New York and Ohio) and the German Evangelical Synod of the Northwest (covering Illinois, Indiana, Michigan, and several Kentucky cities on the Ohio River), becoming the German Evangelical Synod of North America. By 1877 the synod had 324 pastors.

The denomination established Eden Theological Seminary in St. Louis, Missouri, for the training of its clergy; today, Eden remains a seminary of the United Church of Christ.

In the early 20th century, the ESNA became active in the ecumenical movement, joining the Federal Council of Churches and pursuing church union. In 1934, it had 281,598 members and 1,227 pastors. At that time it joined with another denomination of German background, the Reformed Church in the United States, forming the Evangelical and Reformed Church. A generation later, this church united, in turn, in 1957, with the General Council of Congregational Christian Churches to form the United Church of Christ (UCC).

== Notable people and congregations ==
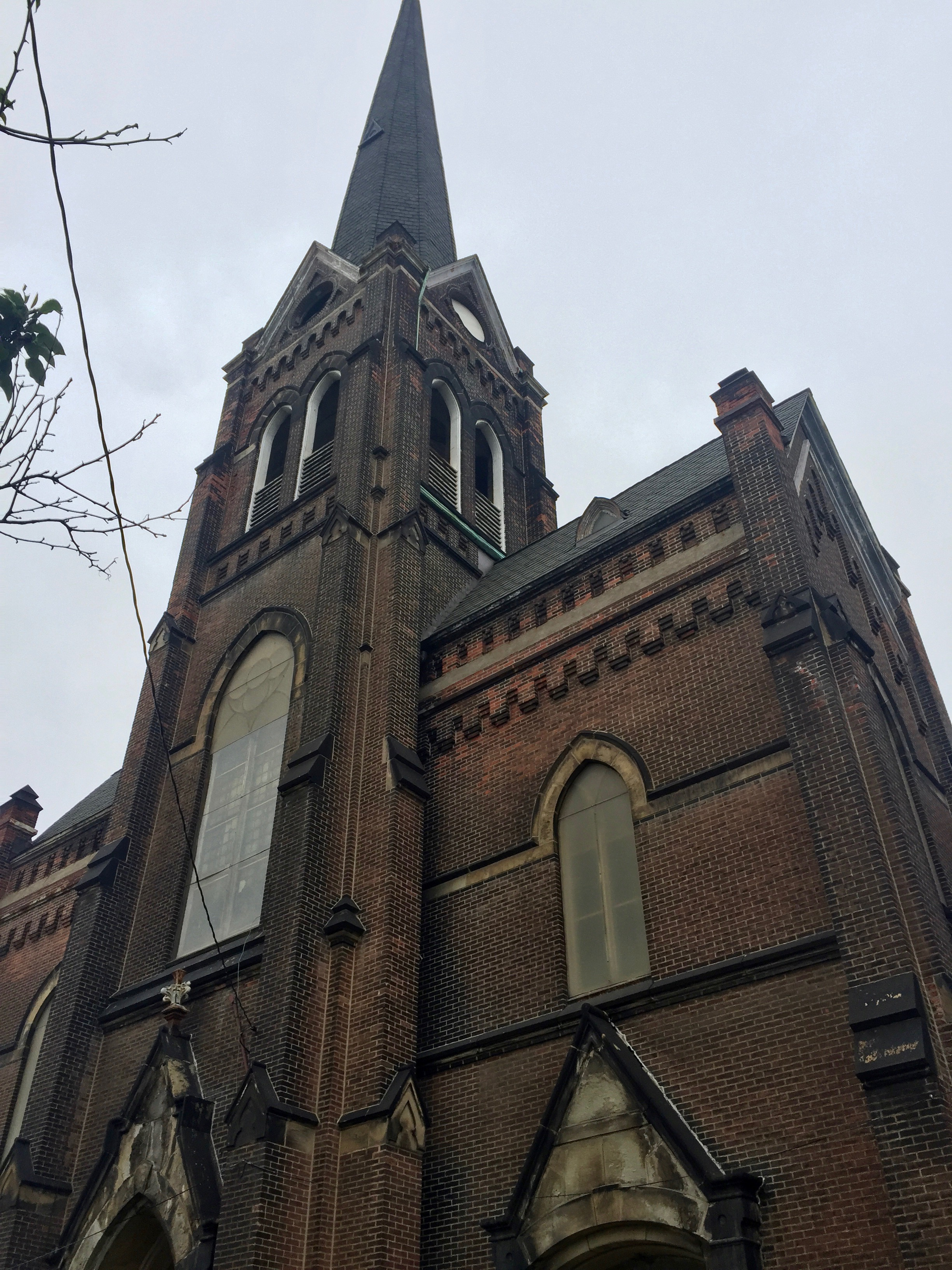
Zion United Church of Christ in Cleveland, Ohio.

The oldest Evangelical Synod-heritage congregations are believed to be Femme Osage United Church of Christ near Augusta, Missouri; Bethlehem UCC in Ann Arbor, Michigan; Saint John's-Saint Luke Evangelical and Reformed UCC in Detroit, Michigan; or The United Church (UCC/United Methodist) in Washington, D.C., each of which were founded in 1833.

The oldest Lutheran church in Chicago, Illinois, was originally an Evangelical Synod congregation. The Deutsche Evangelische Lutherische Sankt Paulus Gemeinde (German Evangelical Lutheran St. Pauls Congregation) was founded in 1843 and is now known as St. Pauls UCC.

Zion Evangelical and Reformed Church, St. Joseph, Missouri, was founded 1858 by Rev. Heckmann to serve the families who had come from various parts of Germany who were part Lutheran, part United and part Reformed. The new congregation was named The United Evangelical Protestant Congregation of St. Joseph, Missouri.

The Zion Evangelical Church in Cleveland, Ohio, was founded in 1867. The merger of the Evangelical Synod and the Reformed Church in the United States took place in this building on June 26–27, 1934.

Reinhold Niebuhr and H. Richard Niebuhr, two siblings who developed strong reputations during the mid-20th century for their theological acumen, were both members of the Evangelical Synod and its successors.
