= American Theological Society =

Coordinates: 40.344832°N 74.663766°W

The American Theological Society (ATS), founded in 1912, is the oldest professional theological society in North America. It has met at least once each year in various locations on the East Coast of the United States, lately at Princeton Theological Seminary in Princeton, New Jersey. Membership is by nomination and election, and is limited to 100 people at any given time. The purpose of the American Theological Society is to foster research excellence in the various theological disciplines and to cultivate collegial relationships.

== Membership ==
Membership in the American Theological Society is by nomination and election by two-thirds of the members voting at the annual meeting. The society's membership is capped at one hundred. There are several categories of membership. Active members of the American Theological Society are those who regularly attend its annual meetings and regularly pay the annual dues. Sustaining members are previously active members who have not attended a meeting within the past three years, but who have continued to pay the annual dues. Inactive members are those who have not attended at least one meeting within a three-year period and who have ceased to pay annual dues for at least three years. Members-designate are those who have been elected to membership but who have not yet attended an annual meeting.

== Executive ==
The American Theological Society's business is organized by an executive committee consisting of a president, a vice-president (who is also president-elect), the immediately past president, a secretary, a treasurer, a program officer, and membership officer, and two at-large members. All are elected by the society's membership at its annual meeting.

== Presidents ==
The presidents of the American Theological Society are as follows:

- 1912–1913: William Adams Brown
- 1913–1914: Daniel Evans
- 1914–1915: W. D. MacKenzie
- 1915–1916: George Cross
- 1916–1917: E. S. Drown
- 1917–1918: F. C. Porter
- 1918–1919: A. C. McGiffert
- 1919–1920: D. C. Macintosh
- 1920–1921: Rufus M. Jones
- 1921–1922: A. M. Dulles
- 1922–1923: Eugene W. Lyman
- 1923–1924: M. G. Evans
- 1924–1925: E. Hershey Sneath
- 1925–1926: A. L. Gillett
- 1926–1927: S. B. Meeser
- 1927–1928: A. C. Knudson
- 1928–1929: W. P. Ladd
- 1929–1930: R. M. Vaughan
- 1930–1931: John Baillie
- 1931–1932: Durant Drake
- 1932–1933: G. W. Richards
- 1933–1934: E. S. Brightman
- 1934–1935: J. B. Pratt
- 1935–1936: J. S. Bixler
- 1936–1937: W. K. Wright
- 1937–1938: W. M. Urban
- 1938–1939: R. E. Hume
- 1939–1940: A. G. Widgery
- 1940–1941: Angus Dun
- 1941–1942: George Thomas
- 1942–1943: Walter M. Horton
- 1943–1944: Paul Tillich
- 1944–1945: Vergilius Ferm
- 1945–1946: Douglas V. Steere
- 1946–1947: H. Richard Niebuhr
- 1947–1948: Reinhold Niebuhr
- 1948–1949: Norman Pittenger
- 1949–1950: E. A. Burtt
- 1950–1951: Richard Kroner
- 1951–1952: Morton S. Enslin
- 1952–1953: Henry P. Van Dusen
- 1953–1954: John C. Bennett
- 1954–1955: Otto Piper
- 1955–1956: Brand Blanshard
- 1956–1957: Clarence W. Hamilton
- 1957–1958: Nels S. F. Ferré
- 1958–1959: Shelton Smith
- 1959–1960: Albert Outler
- 1960–1961: John Knox
- 1961–1962: Harold DeWolf
- 1962–1963: Wilhelm Pauck
- 1963–1964: Peter Bertocci
- 1964–1965: Paul Ramsey
- 1965–1966: Paul Minear
- 1966–1967: Daniel Day Williams
- 1967–1968: John E. Smith
- 1968–1969: S. Paul Schilling
- 1969–1970: Paul Lehmann
- 1970–1971: George Hendry
- 1971–1972: Roger Hazelton
- 1972–1973: James Luther Adams
- 1973–1974: Eugene Fairweather
- 1974–1975: Walter J. Burghardt
- 1975–1976: Roger L. Shinn
- 1976–1977: Frederick Ferré
- 1977–1978: J. Robert Nelson
- 1978–1979: Avery Dulles
- 1979–1980: Gordon D. Kaufman
- 1980–1981: Carl F. H. Henry
- 1981–1982: Eugene Borowitz
- 1982–1983: J. Alfred Martin Jr.
- 1983–1984: Charles West
- 1984–1985: Bernhard Anderson
- 1985–1986: John D. Godsey
- 1986–1987: Richard A. Norris Jr.
- 1987–1988: Paul Meyer
- 1988–1989: Paul van Buren
- 1989–1990: Charles Curran
- 1990–1991: Gabriel Fackre
- 1991–1992: Franz J. van Beeck
- 1992–1993: J. Deotis Roberts
- 1993–1994: Owen C. Thomas
- 1994–1995: Karlfried Froehlich
- 1995–1996: Edward LeRoy Long Jr.
- 1996–1997: Geoffrey Wainwright
- 1997–1998: Stanley S. Harakas
- 1998–1999: Robert W. Jenson
- 1999–2000: Joanne McWilliam
- 2000–2001: Michael Fahey
- 2001–2002: Christopher Morse
- 2002–2003: Georges Tavard
- 2003–2004: Robert K. Johnston
- 2004–2005: J. Philip Wogaman
- 2005–2006: Robert Cummings Neville
- 2006–2007: Elizabeth A. Johnson
- 2007–2008: Daniel L. Migliore
- 2008–2009: Max Stackhouse
- 2009–2010: Kathryn Tanner
- 2010–2011: Peter Slater
- 2011–2012: Peter Paris
- 2012–2013: Charles M. Wood
- 2013–2014: Francis Schüssler Fiorenza
- 2014–2015: M. Douglas Meeks
- 2015–2016: Peter C. Phan
- 2016-2017: Wesley Wildman

== Related societies ==
There are a number of other theological societies in North America.

=== Self-described national theological societies ===
- Catholic Theological Society of America (founded in 1946; )
- The Evangelical Theological Society (founded in 1949; website)
- Wesleyan Theological Society (founded in 1965; website)
- Orthodox Theological Society in America (founded in 1966; website)
- Adventist Theological Society (probably founded in 1988; website)

=== Self-described regional theological societies ===
- American Theological Society Midwest Division (founded in 1927; website)
- Pacific Coast Theological Society (founded in 1939; website)
- College Theology Society (founded in 1953; website)
- Old Life Theological Society (founded around 2004; website)
- Fox Valley Theological Society (founded around 2009 or 2010; website)
- Boston Theological Society (founding year unknown; website)
- Theological Discussion Group, currently "New Haven Theological Discussion Group" (founding year unknown; no website)
