= Gabriel Fackre =

American theologian (1926–2018)

The Reverend Gabriel Fackre
- Born: January 25, 1926; Jersey City, New Jersey, US
- Died: January 31, 2018 (aged 92); Oregon City, Oregon, US
- Spouse: Dorothy Ashman Fackre (m. 1945; died 2017)

Ecclesiastical career
- Religion: Christianity
- Church: Evangelical and Reformed Church; United Church of Christ

Academic background
- Education: University of Chicago
- Thesis: A Comparison and Critique of the Interpretations of Dehumanization in the Thought of Soren Kierkegaard and Karl Marx (1962)
- Influences: Karl Barth; Avery Dulles; Reinhold Niebuhr

Academic work
- Discipline: Theology
- Institutions: Lancaster Theological Seminary; Andover Newton Theological School

Gabriel Joseph Fackre (1926–2018) was an American theologian and Abbot Professor of Christian Theology Emeritus at Andover Newton Theological School in Newton, Massachusetts (now Andover Newton Seminary at Yale). He was on the school's faculty for 25 years before retiring in 1996. Previous to that he was Professor of Theology and Culture at Lancaster Theological Seminary in Pennsylvania, teaching there from 1961 through 1970. Fackre has also served as visiting professor or held lectureships at 40 universities, colleges, and seminaries. His papers are housed in Special Collections at Princeton Theological Seminary Libraries, Princeton, New Jersey.

== Personal life ==
Fackre was born on January 25, 1926, in Jersey City, New Jersey, and raised in Brooklyn, New York City. He and his spouse, Dorothy Ashman Fackre, married in 1945, were students together at both Bucknell University and the University of Chicago Divinity School and later the parents of five children and grandparents of eight. Dorothy, also an ordained minister, served with Gabriel in congregations in the Chicago stockyards district and in the greater Pittsburgh steel mill towns of Homestead and Duquesne, Pennsylvania, for 12 years. Dorothy died in 2017. They were theological collaborators and wrote a number of books together.

Fackre died on January 31, 2018.

== Theology, ethics, and mission ==
Fackre wrote in the fields of theology, ethics, and mission in thirty books and monographs, among them five volumes of a series on Christian doctrine, The Christian Story, and chapters and encyclopedia entries in another ninety volumes and over three hundred articles and book reviews. He was president of the American Theological Society. Fackre was involved, often with his spouse, in various efforts in social action, beginning with their spearheading a campaign to bring Nisei students from World War II internment camps to Bucknell and taking part in a Quaker “peace caravan” in the closing year of the war. At Chicago, Fackre and another Divinity School student led a walk-out and protest at the Quadrangle (faculty) Club, where they worked as waiters, at the refusal by the majority of its members to include in membership an African-American professor, a policy shortly thereafter overturned. While at Chicago, after a summer student trip to study “The Church and the Working-Classes in Great Britain,” Fackre and his wife served a mission congregation in the back-of-the yards district, then spent a decade in a two-point mission charge in the steel mill towns of Homestead and Duquesne, Pennsylvania addressing issues of the working poor.

In the decade of the 1960s when Fackre was a professor at Lancaster Theological Seminary in the same state, they, with their children, helped to found a network of "freedom schools" for young black and white Lancastrians, and participated in demonstrations for civil rights in the city. Fackre also took part in the initial civil rights demonstration in the city protesting hiring policies at downtown department stories in the summer of 1963, joined the March on Washington in 1963, and was part of a United Church of Christ contingent that assisted in the registration of black citizens in Canton, Mississippi in 1964. Later, the couple led in campaigns to integrate the city's de facto segregated junior high schools, helped to found a citizen's newspaper, The Lancaster Independent Press, and a coffee house, Encounter, out of which much of the foregoing activity emanated. After moving to the Boston area where Professor Fackre was called to teach systematic theology at Andover Newton Theological School, efforts at social change continued with Fackre chairing a committee that founded another citizens' newspaper, The Newton Times, and both he and his wife participated in peace and justice activities during their twenty-five years in Greater Boston. In retirement on Cape Cod, they continued to take part in advocating for the homeless, efforts in environmental amelioration, and peace concerns.

== Doctrine and ecumenism ==
Fackre was raised a Baptist by his mother, Mary Comstock Fackre, whose husband, Toufick Fackre, was a Syriac Orthodox priest. Later, he and his Episcopalian spouse, Dorothy, sought an ecumenical denomination in which to carry out their anticipated ministry. They moved to the Evangelical and Reformed Church in 1950, the denomination of Reinhold Niebuhr, whose thought much influenced them in a journey out of an earlier pacifism to a post-war period of neo-orthodoxy. In 1957, that Church merged with the Congregational Christian Churches to form the United Church of Christ, in which they both held their ministerial standing.

Ecumenism was a leading commitment for both Fackres, given expression in their first book, Under the Steeple, relating the "life together" themes of the two early World Council of Churches assemblies they attended—Amsterdam in 1948 and Evanston, Illinois, in 1954—to parish life and mission. Professor Fackre was one of the representatives of the United Church of Christ in the nine-denomination Consultation on Church Union (predecessor to the current Churches of Christ Uniting) and the Lutheran-Reformed Conversation, the latter eventuating in the full communion agreement of 1997 of the Evangelical Lutheran Church in America, the Presbyterian Church, USA, the Reformed Church of America and the United Church of Christ. He also was engaged as an "evangelical catholic" in outreach, on one hand, to Churches in the Great Tradition as a co-founder of the Mercersburg Society and board member of the Center for Catholic and Evangelical Theology, and on the other, to contemporary evangelicalism in a variety of conferences and book projects of the same. Kindred to the latter, he has written extensively on evangelism, seeking to wed social concern to that outreach.

The conjunction of concern about Christian doctrine and commitment to the ecumenical project led Fackre to invest himself deeply in efforts at theological renewal in his own denomination. Prominent among them have been the founding in 1984 of the annual Craigville Theological Colloquies on Cape Cod and in 1993 the Confessing Christ movement in the United Church of Christ. Also after 1962, he encouraged teacher–pastor dialogue on current theological topics by launching "Theological Tabletalk" groups in both seminaries and in retirement on Cape Cod.

A Festschrift for Gabriel Fackre, with recognition as well of his close partnership in life and mission with Dorothy, appeared in 2002, edited by their daughter Skye Fackre Gibson.

== Publications ==
=== Books ===
- The Promise of Reinhold Niebuhr, Third Edition, Eerdmans, 2011.
- The Christian Story, Vol. 5, The Church: Signs of the Spirit and Signs of the Times, Eerdmans, 2007.
- The Christian Story, Vol. 4, Christology in Context, Eerdmans, forthcoming, 2006.
- Believing, Caring and Doing in the United Church of Christ, Pilgrim Press, 2005.
- The Day After: A Retrospective on Religious Dissent in the Presidential Crisis, Eerdmans, 2000.
- Editor, Judgment Day at the White House, Eerdmans, 1999.
- Restoring the Center: Essays Evangelical and Ecumenical, InterVarsity, 1998. *Affirmations and Admonitions: Lutheran Decisions and Dialogue, co-author with Michael Root, Eerdmans, 1998.
- The Doctrine of Revelation: A Narrative Interpretation, University of Edinburgh Press, GB and Eerdmans, USA, 1997.
- The Christian Story, Vol.1, revised, third edition, Eerdmans, 1996.
- What About Those Who Have Never Heard?, co-author with Ronald Nash and John Sanders, InterVarsity, 1995.
- The Promise of Reinhold Niebuhr, revised edition, University Press of America, 1994.
- Ecumenical Faith in Evangelical Perspective, Eerdmans, 1993.
- Christian Basics: A Primer for Pilgrims, co-author with Dorothy Fackre, Eerdmans, 1991-1994, 1998, 2000(6th printing).
- The Christian Story, Volume 2, Authority: Scripture in the Church for the World, Eerdmans, 1987.
- The Christian Story, Volume 1, revised edition, Eerdmans, 1984.
- The Religious Right and Christian Faith, Eerdmans (hardcover, 1982; paper, 1983).
- Youth Ministry: The Gospel and the People, (co-author with Jan Chartier), Judson, 1979, 1980.
- The Christian Story: A Narrative Interpretation of Basic Christian Doctrine, Eerdmans, 978.
- Word In Deed: Theological Themes in Evangelism, Eerdmans, 1975.
- Do and Tell: Engagement Evangelism in the 70s, Eerdmans, 1973, (3 printings).
- Liberation in Middle America, Pilgrim, 1971.
- The Promise of Reinhold Niebuhr, Lippincott, 1970.
- Humiliation and Celebration: Post-radical Themes in Doctrine Morals and Mission, Sheed and Ward, 1969.
- The Rainbow Sign: Christian Futurity, Eerdmans, U.S.A. and Epworth, Great Britain, 1969.
- Secular Impact, Pilgrim Press, 1968.
- Conversation in Faith, UCC Adult Resource Book, United Church Press, 1968.
- The Pastor and the World, United Church Press, 1964.
- The Purpose and Work of the Ministry, Christian Education Press, 1959.
- Under the Steeple, Abingdon Press, 1957, co-author with Dorothy Fackre.

=== Monographs, booklets, pamphlets ===
- “Tradition and Traditionalism,” Confessing Christ Occasional Paper, Winter, 1999-2000; Sound Doctrine in the Church, Theodore Trost Lecture, 1992.
- The Confessional Nature of the United Church of Christ, EKU-UCC Newsletter, 1983. *Christ's Ministry and Ours, Center for the Laity, Andover Newton, 1982.
- The Heritage of Faith and the Horizon of the 80s, Hooker Lecture, 1980.
- Conversion, Division of Homeland Ministries, Disciples of Christ, 1975.
- A Catechism for Today's Storytellers, Youth Magazine, 1972.
- Memory and Hope in a Time of Nostalgia, Council for Lay Life and Work, UCC 1972.
- Christian Faith and Action in the Seventies, Council for Christian Social Action, UCC 1969.
- Second Fronts in Metropolitan Mission, Eerdmans, 1968.
- What Happens in Baptism, Living Faith Series, Westminster Press, 1967.
- The Baptismal Encounter, Lancaster Seminary Occasional Papers, 1962.

=== Contributions to volumes ===
- "Ecumenism and Atonement: A Critical Issue in Ecclesiology," Critical Issues in Ecclesiology, Festschrift for Carl Braaten, Susan K. Wood, and Alberto Garcia, eds., Eerdmans, 2011.
- "Max Stackhouse:A Collegial Appreciation," Public Theology for a Global Society, Essays in Honor of Max Stackhouse, Deirdre King Hainsworth, and Scott Paeth, eds., Eerdmans, 2010.
- "A Tribute to Bill Eerdmans at 85," Gabriel and Dorothy Fackre, Taking it Easy, But Taking It, A Festschrift to Honor Wm. B. Eerdmans, Jr., compiled and edited by the Eerdmans Staff, Eerdmans, 2010.
- "Calvin on Justification in Ecumenical and Evangelical Perspective," John Calvin and Evangelical Theology, Sung Wook Chung, ed., Westminster John Knox, 2009.
- "Jesus Christ in the Texts of the United Church of Christ," Who Do You Say I Am?: Christology and Identity in the United Church of Christ, Scott Paeth, ed., United Church Press, 2006.
- “A Case for the Cross? Passionate Apologetics,” in Anna M. Robbins, ed.; Ecumenical and Eclectic: The Unity of the Church in the Contemporary World: Essays in Honor of Alan P. Sell, Paternoster, GB and Wipf and Stock, USA., 2007.
- “How Theology Lives in the UCC,” in J. Martin Bailey and Evan Goulder, eds. UCC@50: Our Future, United Church of Christ, 2006
- “Revelation,” in Sung Wook Chung, ed., Karl Barth and Evangelical Theology: Convergences and Divergences, Paternoster, GB and Baker Academic, USA. 2006.
- “Justification in Reformed Perspective,” in Wayne Stumme, ed., The Gospel of Justification, Grand Rapids, Eerdmans, 2006.
- “The Resurrection and the Uniqueness of Christ,” in Christ the One and Only: A Global Affirmation of the Uniqueness of Christ, in Sung Wook Chung, ed. Paternoster, GB and Baker, USA, 2005.
- “Mutual Affirmation and Admonition: Ecumenical and Evangelical,” Pilgrims on the Sawdust Trail, Timothy George, ed., Baker Book House, 2005.
- “Report to the Lutheran Bishops on Common Calling,” in On the Way: The Teaching Church, Frederick Trost., ed., Kirk House Publishers, 2005.
- “Which Way Toward a Theology of Religions?” in Faith in a Global Context, Festschrift for Robert Neville. T&T Clark, GB, 2005.
- “Carl Henry,” in Dictionary of Apologetics London: Inter-Varsity Press, GB, 2005.
- “Biblical Inerrancy,” in Encyclopedia of Protestantism, Hans Hillerbrand, ed., New York: Routledge, 2004.
- “Foreword,” Universal Salvation? London: Paternoster Press, 2003 and Grand Rapids: Eerdmans, 2004.
- “Reformed Ecumenics,” in Wallace Alston and Michael Welker, eds., Reformed Theology, Identity and Ecumenicity Grand Rapids: Eerdmans, 2003.
- “An Evangelical Narrative Christology for a Religiously Plural Word, in Alister McGrath & Evangelical Theology, Sung Wook Chung, ed. London: Paternoster Press, 2003, GB, and Baker, US, 2003.
- “Life Everlasting,” n Roger Van Harn, ed., Essays and Sermons on the Apostles Creed, Grand Rapids: Eerdmans, 2004.
- “Preface,” Frederick Trost, We Know Only in Part: Reflections on a Journey in Faith, Minneapolis: Kirk House Publishers, forthcoming, 2004.
- “A Reformed Perspective on the Joint Declaration,” Ecumenical Perspectives on the Joint Declaration, William Rusch, ed., Liturgical Press, 2004.
- “Binding Up Wounds and Resisting the Powers,” O God, Tender and Just: Reflections and Response after September 11, 2001, United Church Press, 2002.
- “Theological Thoughts on the Present Crisis,” He Comes the Broken Heart to Bind: Reflections on September 11, 2001, Frederick Trost, ed., Confessing Christ, 2001.
- “Narrative Theology in Evangelical Perspective,” Faith and Narrative, Keith Yandell, ed., New York: Oxford University Press, 2001.
- “Biblical Inerrancy,” “Inspiration, Biblical,” Encyclopedia of Fundamentalism, Brenda Brasjer, ed., Great Barrington, MA: Berkshire Reference Works/Routledge, 2001.
- “Confessing Christ Today,” In Essentials Unity: Essays on the Nature and Purpose of the Church, Douglas Meeks and Robert Mutton, eds. Minneapolis: Kirk House Pub., 2001.
- “John 14:1-4, Acts 2:42-47, Acts 3: 12-19, Acts 4:5-12, 1 Peter 3:18-22,” in Biblical Exegesis for Sunday’s Sermon, Roger Van Harn, ed. Eerdmans, 2001.
- “Foreword,” When I Survey the Wondrous Cross, by Richard Floyd, Pickwick, 2000.
- “Kosovo: The Ethics of Heaven, Earth and Hell,” Kosovo: Contending Voices on Balkan Interventions, William J. Buckley, ed. Eerdmans, 2000.
- “The Lutheran Capax Lives,” in Trinity, Time, and Church, Colin Gunton, ed., Festschrift for Robert Jenson, Eerdmans, 2000.
- “Christology,” Evangelical Theology in Transition, Elmer Colyer, ed., Festschrift for Donald Bloesch, InterVarsity, 1999.
- "Suffering and Hope," Library of Distinctive Sermons, Sister, Oregon: Multnomah, 1998.
- "Angels," Library of Distinctive Sermons, Multnomah 1998.
- "Gifts Given: Solidarity and Simultaneity," "Gifts Received: Sovereignty and Sanctification," The Congregation and the Unity of the Church," Currents in Theology and Mission, Ralph Klein, ed., Lutheran School of Theology in Cooperation with Pacific Lutheran Seminary and Wartburg Theological Seminary, 1997.
- "UCC Theological Basics: An Interpretation," and "Hymn Texts and Key Christian Teachings," How Shall We Sing the Lord's Song?: An Assessment of The New Century Hymnal, Richard Christensen, ed., Pickwick Press, 1997.
- "Educating For The Church," Theological Education in the Evangelical Tradition, D. Hart & R.A. Mohler, eds. Grand Rapids, Baker, 1996.
- "Narrative: Evangelical, Postliberal, Ecumenical," The Nature of Confession, T.R. Phillips & Dennis Olkhom, eds. Downers Grove, IL: InterVarsity, 1996.
- "Last Things," The Christian Theology Reader, Alister McGrath, ed., Oxford: Blackwell, 1995.
- "Theological Reflections" and "'Hermeneutics' as the Interpretation of Scripture," Papers from the Initial Meetings of Confessing Christ, February, 1994.
- "Reformed Heritage and Lutheran Connection in the Life of the UCC. Special Note," A Common Calling: The Witness of our Reformation Churches in North America Today. The Report of the Lutheran-Reformed Committee for Theological Conversations, 1988-1992, Keith Nickle and Timothy Lull, editors. Minneapolis: Augsburg/Fortress, 1993.
- "Evangelical Hermeneutics: Commonality and Diversity." Christianity for Tomorrow, Charles Holland, editor. Fort Worth: Biblical Studies Assn., 1992.
- "Hope," Life as Liberty, Life as Trust. Robert Nelson, editor. Grand Rapids: Eerdmans, 1992.
- "Atonement," Encyclopedia of the Reformed Faith, Donald McKim, editor. Louisville: Westminster/John Knox Press, 1992.
- "Abortion," Handbook for Preaching, (co-author with Dorothy Fackre) James Cox, editor. Louisville: Westminster/John Knox, 1992.
- "Foreword," James Crawford, Worthy to Raise Issues: Preaching and Public Responsibility. Cleveland: Pilgrim Press, 1991.
- "The Place of Israel in Christian Faith," Gott lieben und Gebote halten, Markus Bockmuehl, editor. Brunnen Verlag, 1991.
- "Eschatology and Systematics," Ex Auditu, Robert Guelich, editor. Pickwick, 1990.
- "Sin," (co-author with Dorothy Fackre), Words of Faith: Worship Program Book, 1991 1992 Office of Church Life and Leadership, UCC, 1991.
- "Ministry as Presence," Dictionary of Pastoral Care and Counseling, R. Hunter, editor. Nashville: Abingdon Press, 1990.
- "Christian Doctrine in the United Church of Christ," Theology and Identity: Traditions, Movements and Polity in the United Church of Christ, Daniel Johnson and David Hambrick-Stowe, editors, Pilgrim Press, 1990.
- "God" and "Evangelism," Harper's Dictionary of Religious Education, Kendig & Iris Cully, editors. Harper & Row, 1990.
- "Summary Observations," The Leuenberg Agreement and Lutheran-Reformed Relationships, W. Rusch and D. Martensen, editors. Augsburg Fortress, 1989.
- "Political Fundamentalism," Theology, Politics and Peace. T. Runyon, editor. Orbis, 1989.
- "Introduction," Liberating News, by Orlando Costas, Eerdmans, 1989.
- "Theology: Ephemeral, Conjunctural and Perennial," America's Changing Churches, 1935-1985, David Lotz, editor. Eerdmans, 1989.
- "God the Discloser," Christian Faith & Practice in the Modern World, Mark Noll and David Wells, editors. Eerdmans, 1988.
- "Reinhold Niebuhr," Reformed Theology in America, David Wells, editor. Eerdmans, 1985.
- "The Use of Scripture in My Work in Systematics,” The Use of the Bible in Theology: Evangelical Options, Robert Johnston, editor. John Knox Press, 1985.
- "Defending the Faith Today," Lion/Eerdmans Handbook of World Christianity, Lion (GB) and Eerdmans (USA), 1985.
- "Carl Henry," Handbook of Christian Theologians, revised edition, Martin Marty and Dean Peerman, editors. Abingdon, 1984.
- "Ecology and Theology," Moral Dilemmas, Richard Purtill, editor. Wadsworth, 1984.
- "Christ's Ministry and Ours," The Laity in Ministry, George Peck and John Hoffman, editors. Judson, 1984.
- "Advent: Interpretation," Social Themes of the Christian Year, Dieter Hessel, editor. Geneva, 1983.
- "Antinomianism," "Blasphemy," "Evangelical, Evangelicalism," "Imputation," "Merit," The New Dictionary of Christian Theology and The Westminster Dictionary of Christian Theology, Alan Richardson and John Bowden, editors. SCM (GB), 1983 and Westminster (U.S.A.), 1983.
- "The Nature of the Church," Leaders' Box, Office of Church Life and Leadership, 1982 Consulting Editor, Lion/Eerdmans Handbook of Christian Belief, Lion (GB), 1982 and Eerdmans (USA), 1982.
- "Preface," Who Dares to Preach? by Wallace Fisher. Augsburg, 1980.
- "Preface," The Wisdom of the Heart, by Wallace Robbins, Worcester, MA, First Unitarian Church, 1979.
- "Theology and Forms of Confession in the United Church off Christ," Consultation on Union, Disciples Divinity House, 1979.
- "The New Morality," Issues in Sexual Ethics, Souderton, PA, UCPBW, 1979.
- "The Struggle for Unity," Festival of the Church, NY, OCLL, 1978.
- "Guide to Do and Tell," New Life Mission Handbook, Tidings, 1974.
- "Dawn People," Jesus Christ Frees and Unites, Section I, preparatory material, Nairobi Assembly, WCC, 1974.
- "Ecology and Theology," Western Man and Environmental Ethics, Ian Barbour, editor. Addison-Wesley, 1973.
- "The New Leisure: Planner and Citizen in Partnership,” Leisure and the Quality of Life, AAHPER Press, 1972.
- "Parsimony, Pluralism, and the COCU Parish," Church Union at Mid-Point, Paul A. Crow, Jr. and William J. Boney, editors. Association Press, 1972.
- "Going East: Neomysticism and Christian Faith," Catholic Youth Work Annual, 1971, United States Catholic Conference, 1972.
- "The Blue Collar White and the Far Right," Class and Group Behavior: A Book of Readings on Protest and Pressure in American Society, John Florer, William Baker, et al., editors. Kendall/Hunt, 1971.
- "Ethical Guidelines for the Control of Life," Moral Issues and Christian Response, Paul Jersild and Dale Johnson, editors. Holt, Rinehart, and Winston, 1971.
- "Redesigning Life: Scenarios and Guidelines," Should Doctors Play God? Claude Frazier, editor. Broadman Press, 1971.
- "Is That Your Doing Lord?" Tune In, Herman Ahrens, Jr.,editor. Pilgrim Press, 1968.
- "Witness is a Two-Way Street," Creative Ministries, David Marshall, editor. United Church Press, 1967.
- "Voices for a World Come of Age," Search for Identity, The Methodist Church, 1967; reprinted in Protestant Women of the Chapel Program Guide, 1969 70.
- "The New Morality," Storm Over Ethics, United Church Press, 1967.
- "The Issue of Transcendence in the New Theology, New Morality, and New Forms," New Theology No. 4, M. Marty and D. Peerman, editors. The Macmillan Co.,1967.
- "The Crisis of the Congregation: A Debate," Voluntary Associations: Essays in Honor of James Luther Adams, D. B. Robertson, editor. John Knox Press, 1966.
- "Where You Find God: Albert Jenkins," "Why I Belong," Clyde Reid, editor. United Church Press, 1964.

=== Films ===
- "Getting the Story Straight," "Getting the Story Out," and "Getting the Story In," produced by the United Church Board for Homeland Ministries.
- "Dawn People" produced by Imago Associates for UCBHM.

=== Audio cassettes ===
- "A Tale of Light," and "Getting the Story Out," produced by Tidings, United Methodist Church.
- Catalyst Cassettes, November, 1975, April, May, 1980.
- Thesis Cassettes, May, 1979.

=== Video cassettes ===
- "Christian Basics," Andover Newton Visiting Professor Series, Parts I and II, 1994-1995; series also on YouTube, under "Gabriel Fackre."

=== Talking books ===
- John Milton Society, January, 1980.

=== Newsletter ===
- Theology and Culture Newsletter, Nos. 1-56, 1967-2016.

=== Festschrift ===
- Story Lines: Chapters in Thought, Word, and Deed: Festschrift for Gabriel Fackre, Skye F. Gibson, editor, Eerdmans, 2002.

Professional and academic associations
Preceded by Charles Curran	President of the American Theological Society; 1990–1991	Succeeded by Franz Jozef van Beeck
