= Serenity Prayer =

Prayer authored by American theologian Reinhold Niebuhr

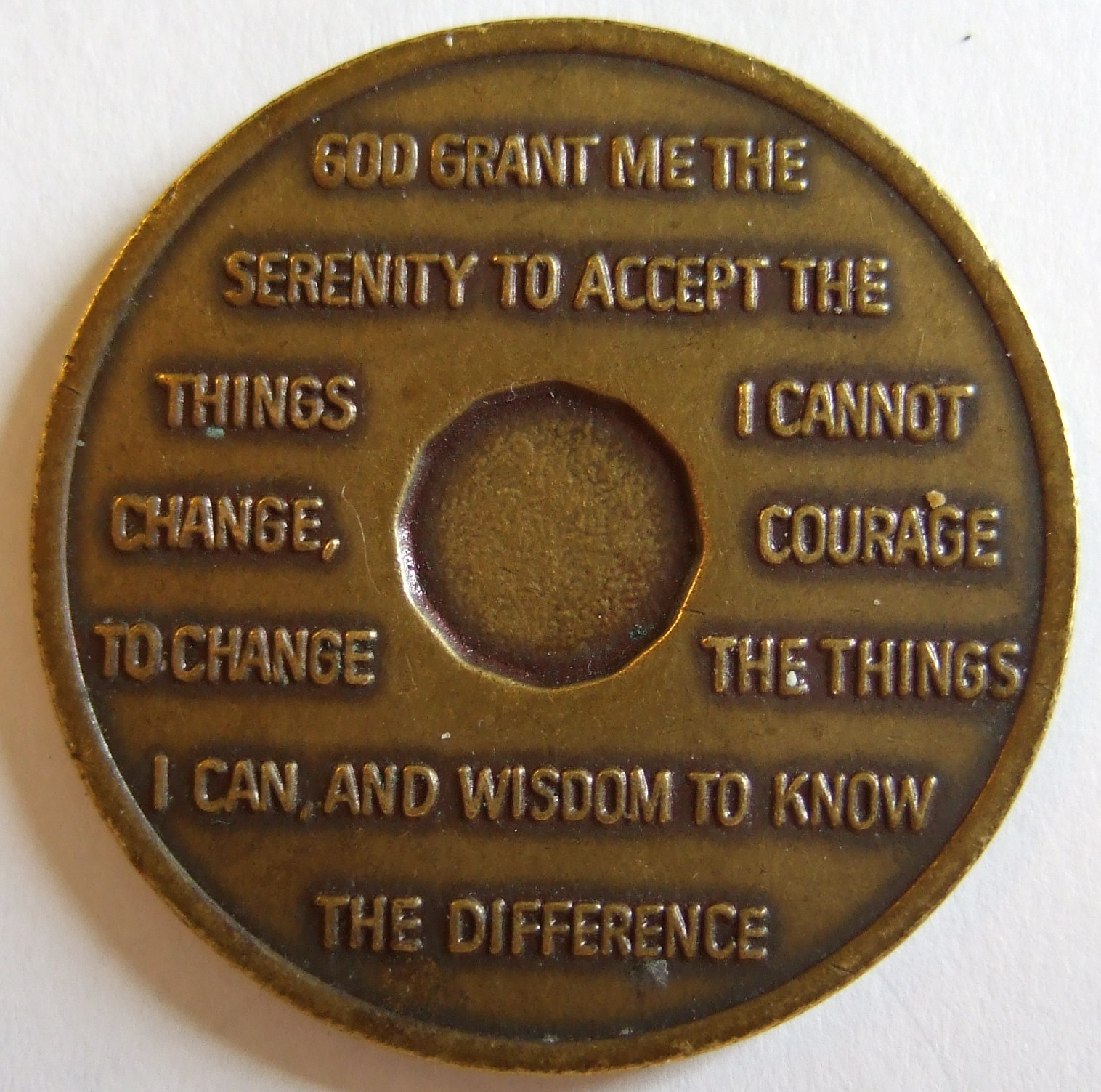
A version of the Serenity prayer appearing on an Alcoholics Anonymous medallion (date unknown).

The Serenity Prayer is a prayer or invocation for the serenity to accept what cannot be changed, the courage to change what can be, and the wisdom to understand the difference.

The prayer has achieved very wide distribution, spreading through the YWCA and other groups in the 1930s, and in Alcoholics Anonymous and related organizational materials since at least 1941. Since at least the early 1960s, commercial enterprises such as Hallmark Cards have used the prayer in their greeting cards and other media.

== History ==
A version of the prayer was originally composed by Protestant theologian Reinhold Niebuhr in the early 1930s. Initially popularized by one of his colleagues, the prayer began to spread widely without reference to the original author.

Around 1932, Niebuhr is reported to have first used the prayer as the last part of a longer prayer. In an October 31, 1932 diary entry by American YWCA official Winnifred Wygal, she quotes her colleague Niebuhr:

The victorious man in the day of crisis is the man who has the serenity to accept what he cannot help and the courage to change what must be altered.

Drawing on this, Wygal published a prayer in the March 1933 edition of YWCA periodical The Woman's Press, which was soon shared with a broader audience on the front page of the Santa Cruz Sentinel of March 15, 1933. It read:

Oh, God, give us courage to change what must be altered, serenity to accept what can not be helped, and insight to know the one from the other.

The prayer was also quoted in the Richmond Times-Dispatch later that month. Substantial quotes from the prayer were also printed in two Atlanta newspapers that month.

The prayer appeared a few additional times in American and Canadian newspapers in the 1930s, associated with the YWCA or with individual women. In 1937, the prayer was published in a Christian student newsletter, attributing it to Niebuhr.

Wygal published the prayer again in her 1940 book We Plan Our Own Worship Services, and attributed it to Niebuhr. It took this form:

O God, give us the serenity to accept what cannot be changed, the courage to change what can be changed, and the wisdom to know the one from the other.

In June 1941, the prayer was published in an obituary in the New York Herald Tribune, and from here became known by the first Alcoholics Anonymous group. The organisation embraced it and spread it widely. It was initially known within the group as "the AA prayer", but by the late 1940s, it was known as "the serenity prayer".

Niebuhr presented it in a 1943 sermon at Heath Evangelical Union Church in Heath, Massachusetts. Niebuhr's wife and daughter would later say this was when they understood the prayer was first written and used. It then also appeared in a sermon of Niebuhr's in the 1944 A Book of Prayers and Services for the Armed Forces, and was printed on cards for American soldiers in WWII. From January 1944, Niebuhr began being cited as the source of the prayer in newspaper articles.

Niebuhr also published it in a magazine column in 1951. By this stage, the prayer had become commonly quoted as:

God, grant me the serenity to accept the things I cannot change, the courage to change the things I can, and the wisdom to know the difference.

In 1962, Hallmark began using the prayer in its graduation cards, crediting Niebuhr, and in the 1970s they also produced a wall plaque. Posters and household ornaments were produced by others without attribution.

Rhetorician William FitzGerald believes Wygal wrote the prayer, arguing that sexism is the reason for the misattribution. Quotation researcher Fred R. Shapiro has alternated in his conclusions over time. In his 2021 revision of the Yale Book of Quotations and in his discussion of it, he says Wygal "was the author of the earliest known occurrence".

== Versions ==
The prayer has appeared in many versions. Reinhold Niebuhr's versions of the prayer were always printed as a single prose sentence; printings that set out the prayer as three lines of verse modify the author's original version. The best-known form is a late version, as it includes a reference to grace not found before 1951:

God, give me grace to accept with serenity
the things that cannot be changed,
courage to change the things
which should be changed,
and the wisdom to distinguish
the one from the other.

The following clauses were added in the AA Origin of the Serenity Prayer: A Historic Paper but were not part of the tripartite original. Niebuhr's daughter in her book The Serenity Prayer: Faith and Politics in Time of Peace and War said: "... their message and their tone are not in any way Niebuhrian."

Living one day at a time,
Enjoying one moment at a time,
Accepting hardship as a pathway to peace,
Taking, as He did,
This sinful world as it is,
Not as I would have it,
Trusting that He will make all things right,
If I surrender to His will,
That I may be reasonably happy in this life,
And supremely happy with Him forever in the next.

Amen.

A version, apparently quoted from memory and asking for the author of the quotation, appeared in the "Queries and Answers" column in The New York Times Book Review in July 1950, and received a reply in the same column in August 1950, attributing the prayer to Niebuhr, and quoting it as follows:

O God and Heavenly Father,
Grant to us the serenity of mind to accept that which cannot be changed; courage to change that which can be changed, and wisdom to know the one from the other, through Jesus Christ our Lord, Amen.(subscription required)

Today, twelve-step recovery programs generally use a slightly different version, the text of which has been adopted in official publications from groups such as Alcoholics Anonymous:

God grant me the serenity to accept the things I cannot change,
Courage to change the things I can,
and Wisdom to know the difference.

=== Precursors ===
1st-century Greek Stoic philosopher Epictetus wrote:

Make the best use of what is in your power, and take the rest as it happens. Some things are up to us [eph' hêmin] and some things are not up to us. Our opinions are up to us, and our impulses, desires, aversions—in short, whatever is our own doing. Our bodies are not up to us, nor are our possessions, our reputations, or our public offices, or, that is, whatever is not our own doing."

The 8th-century Indian Buddhist scholar Shantideva of the ancient Nalanda Mahavihara suggested:

If there's a remedy when trouble strikes,
What reason is there for dejection?
And if there is no help for it,
What use is there in being glum?

The 11th-century Jewish philosopher Solomon ibn Gabirol wrote:

And they said: At the head of all understanding – is distinguishing between what is and what cannot be, and the consoling of what is not in our power to change.

A Mother Goose rhyme (dating back to at least 1827) has been juxtaposed with Niebuhr's prayer by philosopher W. W. Bartley:

For every ailment under the sun
There is a remedy, or there is none;
If there be one, try to find it;
If there be none, never mind it.

In 1801, German philosopher Friedrich Schiller wrote:

Blessed is he, who has learned to bear what he cannot change, and to give up with dignity, what he cannot save."

=== Spurious attributions ===
The prayer has been variously attributed (without evidence) to Thomas Aquinas, Cicero, Augustine, Boethius, Marcus Aurelius, and Francis of Assisi, among others.

Theodor Wilhelm, a professor of education at Kiel University, published a German version of the prayer under the pseudonym "Friedrich Oetinger" in 1951. Wilhelm's version of the prayer became popular in West Germany, where it was widely but falsely attributed to the 18th-century philosopher Friedrich Christoph Oetinger. Elisabeth Sifton described Wilhelm's account of the history of the prayer as "dishonest".

== Use by twelve-step recovery programs ==
The prayer became more widely known after being brought to the attention of Alcoholics Anonymous in 1941 by an early member, who came upon it in a caption in a "routine New York Herald Tribune obituary". The original clipping appeared in the May 28, 1941, public notices section: "Mother--God grant me the serenity to accept things I cannot change, courage to change things I can, and wisdom to know the difference. Goodby."

AA's co-founder Bill W. and the staff liked the prayer and had it printed in modified form and handed around. It has been part of Alcoholics Anonymous ever since, and has also been used in other twelve-step programs. "Never had we seen so much A.A. in so few words," noted Bill W. The January 1950 edition of the Grapevine (The International Journal of Alcoholics Anonymous) identifies Niebuhr as the author, as does the AA web site.

== See also ==
- Agency (philosophy)
- Self-efficacy
