= Christian realism =

Political theology in the Christian tradition

Christian realism is a political theology in the Christian tradition. It is built on three biblical presumptions: the sinfulness of humanity, the freedom of humanity, and the validity and seriousness of the Great Commandment. The key political concepts of Christian realism are balance of power and political responsibility.

This political-theological perspective is most closely associated with the work of the 20th-century American theologian and public intellectual Reinhold Niebuhr. Niebuhr argued that the Kingdom of God cannot be realized on earth because of the innately corrupt tendencies of society. Due to the injustices that arise among people, we must be willing to compromise the ideal of Kingdom of Heaven on earth. Niebuhr argued that human perfectibility was an illusion, highlighting the sinfulness of humanity by naming labor disputes and race riots in industrial hubs like Detroit, Michigan, where he pastored, the horrors of the Second World War, the Communist and Fascist totalitarian regimes, and the Holocaust. Christian realism was in part a reaction to the 20th-century Social Gospel movement.

== Augustine of Hippo as the first great Christian realist ==
Niebuhr and his colleagues thought of themselves as following a Christian tradition that had its roots in the Hebrew prophets and later took shape in Christian theology. Augustine of Hippo is generally regarded as the first great Christian realist. Niebuhr commented that Augustine "deserves this distinction because his picture of social reality in his civitas dei gives an adequate account of the social factions, tensions, and competitions which we know to be well-nigh universal on every level of community."

Through his reflections on how the two cities are related, Augustine understood how Christian hope could lead to human responsibility for the problems in the present world. To him, Christians are on pilgrimage or in exile awaiting God's kingdom, but it is the certainty of God's ultimate judgment that provides the basis for Christians to bear their responsibility in the present world. Christians are therefore not spectators. They are called to fully involve in this world with a moral life, while at the same time maintaining that they are freed from worldly pursuits to focus on contributions to the common good. Problems in the present world should be taken seriously, even though Augustine had relatively low expectations that human beings could do much to completely resolve these problems.

== Political influence ==
Christian realism exerted a strong influence on American foreign and domestic policy in the Cold War era. Many members of the neoconservative movement, which arose in part due to the decline of Christian realism in 1960s and 1970s political thought, have claimed allegiance to Niebuhr's philosophy; however, some critics argued that neoconservatism neglected (or outright rejected) Niebuhr's strong commitment to social justice.

== Perspectives on Christian realism ==
Gary Dorrien wrote:

Christian realism inspired no hymns and built no lasting institutions. It was not even a movement, but rather, a reaction to the Social Gospel centered on one person, Reinhold Niebuhr. The Social Gospel, by contrast, was a half-century movement and an enduring perspective that paved the way for modern ecumenism, social Christianity, the Civil Rights Movement, and the field of social ethics.

A New York Times opinion piece by Arthur Schlesinger Jr., written 20 years after Niebuhr's death, read:

[Niebuhr's] emphasis on sin startled my generation, brought up on optimistic convictions of human innocence and perfectibility. But nothing had prepared us for Hitler and Stalin, the Holocaust, concentration camps and gulags. Human nature was evidently as capable of depravity as of virtue ... Traditionally, the idea of the frailty of man led to the demand for obedience to ordained authority. But Niebuhr rejected that ancient conservative argument. Ordained authority, he showed, is all the more subject to the temptations of self-interest, self-deception and self-righteousness. Power must be balanced by power.

Conservative think tank Institute on Religion and Democracy, founded in 1981, has adopted the concept of christian realism, on their social and political approaches.

== Christian realism in the 21st century ==
In the post-9/11 era, a number of scholars have been questioning the overly secular character of political realism, especially in the light of postmodern critique. Charles Jones of the University of Cambridge has suggested that international law and normative theory presuppose Christian ethics in the international relations theory. Despite the Christian realist underpinnings of scholars, originally associated with the English school, the revival of the interest towards religion in International Relations is a relatively recent phenomenon.

== See also ==
- Political realism
