= Winnifred Wygal =

American religious writer (1884–1972)

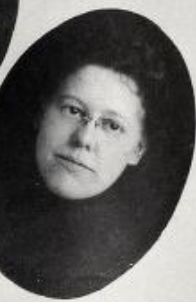
- Winnifred Wygal, from the 1913 yearbook of the University of Nevada
- Born: Winnifred Crane Wygal; August 25, 1884; Springfield, Missouri, U.S.
- Died: July 8, 1972 (age 87); New York, New York, U.S.
- Occupation(s): Religious lecturer, writer

Winnifred Crane Wygal (August 25, 1884 – July 8, 1972) was an American theologian, writer, and YWCA national staff member from 1919 to 1944.

== Early life and education ==
Wygal was born in Springfield, Missouri, the daughter of Frank Wygal and Katie A. Bigelow Wygal. Her father was a wagon maker. She graduated from Drury College in 1906, and pursued further studies at Columbia University and the University of Chicago Divinity School; she completed a master's degree in history and economics in 1912. She studied with Reinhold Niebuhr and Paul Tillich at Union Theological Seminary.

== Career ==
Wygal was a founding member of the Fellowship of Socialist Christians, along with her YWCA colleague Rose Terlin. She worked for the YWCA from 1911 to 1944, and was a member of the YWCA's national professional staff from 1918, when she joined the War Work Council. She was national executive of the YWCA's Student Council from 1922 to 1935. In 1935 she joined the Laboratory Division, and co-chaired the Fletcher Farm Seminar on Religion with Gregory Vlastos. From 1939 to 1944, she was Secretary for Religious Resources in the Division of Community YWCAs. She toured as a lecturer and community organizer in her retirement, and chaired the editorial board of The Intercollegian, the national magazine of the YWCA's Student Council.

Wygal traveled across the United States and internationally in her work. She met Gandhi and Rabindranath Tagore in India, and was a delegate to the World Student Federation Conference in Mysore, during a year of sabbatical travels in 1927 and 1928. In 1928 she was in the Middle East, and in 1937 she went to England to attend a World Council of Churches conference at Oxford. "You intoxicate yourselves when you keep saying how busy you are," she told an audience of Canadian clubwomen in 1949. Traveling was very important to her, as it was a way for her to "broaden the psychological space around" her. Fertig and Perry both appeared frequently in Wygal’s diaries.

== Authorship of the Serenity Prayer ==
While the well-known Serenity Prayer is often attributed to theologian Reinhold Niebuhr, it has also been attributed to Wygal. In 2014, Fred R. Shapiro wrote an essay crediting Wygal as "a highly plausible disseminator" of the prayer's gist in the 1930s. By 2021, Shapiro concluded in The New Yale Book of Quotations that "The demonstrable facts point to Winnifred Wygal as the coiner who combined pieces apparently drawn from Niebuhr with important other pieces of her own devising."

== Publications ==
- "Bapuge" (1928)
- "Christmas Eve" (1934)
- "The Discipline of the Cross and the Beloved Community" (1936)
- "What it Means to Live" (1937)
- Our Religious Vocabulary: A Glossary of Terms in Current Use (1939)
- We plan our own worship services: Business girls practice the act and the art of group worship (1940)
- "The Act and the Art of Worship" (1940)
- "Registration of Women: I Expect to Register" (1943)
- "These Tackled Problems" (1945)
- "We Declare Our Faith in God" (1946, with A. T. Mollegen)
- Reflections of the Spirit (1948)
- We the Peoples of the Ecumenical Church (1949)
- "Fears in an Age of Anxiety" (1951)
- How to Plan Informal Worship (1955)
- "What Shall We Do with Lent?" (1955)

== Personal life ==
Wygal maintained a life deeply entwined with her Christian faith, her work with the YWCA, and relationships with women. Her diaries describe a lifelong effort to try and understand her own spiritual and emotional commitments, with her romantic relationships being grounded in her theological belief in God’s boundless love. Wygal had romantic relationships with women, including her travel companion Ruth Fertig, Helen Price, Jane, Leslie, and a longterm but not exclusive connection with Frances Perry. Her relationship with Frances Perry was one of closeness and tension. She described her connection with Perry as “nothing abnormally erotic but natural, spontaneous, tender.” However, at times Perry’s belief in celibacy conflicted with Wygal’s belief that deep spiritual connections between women could involve physical contact. Despite this, Perry was still seen as an emotional anchor in Wygal’s life.

Wygal referred to her circle of romantic and emotional connections with other women as her “fold,” emphasizing her belief that loving multiple women didn’t contradict Christian principles. Wygal drew on biblical imagery to articulate her nonmonogamous affection and love towards women. She used imagery such as the Parable of the Lost Sheep, to emphasize her love, describing Perry as her “precious lamb” while also acknowledging her care for “other sheep not of this fold.”

Additionally, Wygal’s travels shaped her emotionally. Her trips abroad created physical distance from her partners in the United States, which gave her space to reflect on her relationships. On her 1927 trip to India, she traveled with Ruth Fertig, a younger YWCA colleague. Fertig had previously accompanied Wygal in Hawaii, Japan, China, and the Philippines. Wygal considered her an intimate friend, and their companionship was central to her experience abroad, her presence offering her stability. Wygal often wrote about her in her diary, especially when contemplating connection, spirituality, and beauty. One night lying beneath the Taj Mahal, Wygal questioned the nature of their relationship: “Am I making it with Ruth? O not in the usual sense. We are very devoted.” She also writes of Frances Perry, “a Taj Mahal of life to me is Frances–always I adore her, remote Frances, who shows me my place.”

Wygal died of a heart attack in 1972, at the age of 87, at her home in New York City. Her papers and diaries are in the Schlesinger Library, and at Smith College.
