= American Democratic Socialism =

2021 book by Gary Dorrien

- Cover
- Author: Gary Dorrien
- Language: English
- Subject: History of democratic socialism in the United States
- Genre: Non-fiction
- Publisher: Yale University Press
- Publication date: September 14, 2021
- Publication place: United States
- Media type: Print (hardcover), e-book
- Pages: 752
- ISBN: 978-0-300-25376-4

American Democratic Socialism: History, Politics, Religion, and Theory is a 2021 book by the American social ethicist and theologian Gary Dorrien. It is an intellectual and political history of democratic socialism in the United States from the early nineteenth century to 2020, built around the movement's main organizations. Religious socialism, the Black freedom struggle, and feminism were central to it, Dorrien argues. A companion to his history of European socialism, the book foregrounds Christian socialism and the relationship between secular and religious traditions of the American left.

== Book launch and background ==
Dorrien launched the book at Union Theological Seminary in December 2021, alongside Cornel West and the seminary's president, Serene Jones. He cast it as the culmination of decades of activism and scholarship. In the 1970s and 1980s he had been an organizer and chapter leader in four social justice organizations; after he "belatedly became an academic," he wrote a book on democratic socialism in 1986 and another on Christian socialism and liberation theology in 1990. The first built to a concluding chapter on economic democracy and the Meidner Plan in Sweden, the second to one on West and Rosemary Radford Ruether. The positions in those early books, he said, were "so close" to the new volume's that he wondered whether he had "had any new thoughts in the past 30 years."

Dorrien said he wrote the book because "there is no political and intellectual history of the entire U.S. American democratic socialist tradition, and it was getting late for me to try it." He described it as the sequel to his 2019 history of European socialism, Social Democracy in the Making, which "poured out" of him because he was "eager to get to the U.S. American story." His outlook had taken shape during what he called an "abysmal era" of neoliberal dominance, when the socialist left had "cratered everywhere except one place: the academy." He had been "a holdout from the surge into the academy," entering it late, behind his peers on the career curve. He framed the book's appearance against the financial crash, Occupy Wall Street, Black Lives Matter, the Standing Rock protests, the 2016 and 2020 Sanders campaigns, and the rise of the Democratic Socialists of America.

Dorrien placed himself within the history he told, recounting his conversations with Michael Harrington and his association since 1974 with the Democratic Socialist Organizing Committee, then the Democratic Socialists of America and its Religion and Socialism Working Group. West, who had taught and been taught alongside Dorrien for some four decades, called the book the work of a "participant as well as an intellectual analyst" and highlighted how it recovered the many figures in American public life (from John Dewey and Helen Keller to Ella Baker, Du Bois, and King) who had identified with democratic socialism. Jones described the book as both a history of American democratic socialism and "a genealogy of DSA," a story told backward from the present to its origins.

== Summary ==
Dorrien's history of the democratic socialist tradition in the United States, both intellectual and political, runs from the radical democrats of the early republic to the proposals for a Green New Deal and a new labor party around 2020. He organizes the account around the principal democratic socialist organizations of each era and four framing arguments: that the whole tradition has tried to "Americanize" socialism by speaking the language of individual liberty, building a coalition party of the left, and grappling with American racism, religion, and exceptionalist mythology; that religious socialism has mattered far more than most scholarship allows; that the strongest American socialisms have favored cooperative, decentralized economic democracy over centralized nationalization; and that democratic socialism is a realistic alternative to severe inequality and ecological ruin. The method is contextual intellectual history, not social history. The book braids two strands that Dorrien says may feel like "two books in one" (the secular democratic socialist tradition and the Christian and Jewish religious socialist traditions), arguing that "Christian socialism has been far more important in American democratic socialism than previous books on this subject convey."

Socialism enters the narrative as a European invention, in Fourier and Owen. So do the world's first labor party that New York Owenites founded in 1829, the German "forty-eighters" who linked slavery to capitalism and helped found the Republican Party, and Horace Greeley's Tribune, whose European correspondent was Karl Marx. Dorrien distinguishes self-named "democratic socialism," born as the revisionist flank of Continental Social Democracy, from the welfare-state "social democracy" that socialists actually built once in power. He follows the Socialist Labor Party, the Knights of Labor, Henry George's single tax, Gompers and the craft-union AFL, Daniel De Leon, Morris Hillquit, and Eugene Debs to the founding of the Socialist Party in 1901.

The social gospel chapter, first in a series that reclaims the people and movements usually left at the margins, centers on Washington Gladden, Richard Ely, W. D. P. Bliss, Vida Scudder, and Debs, while the next argues that "socialism is not enough," tracking the Black Baptist orator George Washington Woodbey, W. E. B. Du Bois and the founding of the NAACP, the feminist socialists Kate Richards O'Hare and Lena Morrow Lewis, and the party's antiwar stand and persecution during World War I. From there the narrative runs to the Communist rupture of 1919 and the rise of Norman Thomas, through Thomas's opposition to World War II, Reinhold Niebuhr's break toward Cold War liberalism, and the socialists (A. Philip Randolph, Bayard Rustin, James Farmer, Ella Baker, and Martin Luther King Jr.) who built the civil rights movement, and on to the collision of the New Left and Old Left around Michael Harrington, who named neoconservatism and founded the organizations that became the Democratic Socialists of America.

A later chapter on the academy sets the cultural left of Antonio Gramsci's American reception alongside debates over market socialism and analytical Marxism. It builds to extended treatments of Cornel West and of Nancy Fraser's theory of redistribution, recognition, and participation. The closing chapter moves from the 2008 financial crash and Occupy Wall Street to Bernie Sanders, Alexandria Ocasio-Cortez, Rashida Tlaib, and the Green New Deal. It contends that Sanders is better described as a social democrat than a democratic socialist, while crediting him with reviving the language of class struggle. Dorrien ends by surveying working models of economic democracy: German codetermination, the Mondragon cooperatives, Sweden's Meidner Plan, public banks, and worker ownership. Economic democracy and ecological survival, he argues, have become inseparable.

== Critics ==
Where Jack Ross's earlier book was a party history, Harold Meyerson read this as "not a history of the party but the history of the socialist idea." Meyerson credited Dorrien with a rare command of religious socialism's neglected history and a gift for telling the stories he had dug out of it. The book was a collective biography about what "brought particular people to embrace it." What stood out was race, gender, and religion: the recovery of George Woodbey, the WCTU pipeline that brought women into the party, and Reinhold Niebuhr's post-socialist career. But the penultimate chapter was the exception. It plunges readers "into the miasmic gobbledygook of academic theory" at what he likened to a musical's "11 o'clock number," and asks a great deal of them. Even so, the lesson he drew was approving. Meyerson tied Dorrien's qualified embrace of Harrington and DSA to the book's broader claim—that socialism does best working within and alongside other democratic progressive movements, even only faintly social-democratic ones—and held that DSA's surge after the two Sanders campaigns had vindicated the "Harringtonian strategy" of organizing inside the Democratic Party.

Matt McManus called the book "a masterpiece" and "magisterial." He predicted it would be "the definitive history for some time." He highlighted three contributions. The book insists on the movement's diversity and overturns the myth that American socialism was "just a nonstarter." It casts socialism as a form of faith, which "should give militant left secularists pause." McManus admired that Dorrien "does not let socialists off the hook". The book covers early parties that failed to build durable working-class organizations, and a movement that "adopted a critical attitude towards the New Deal" while backing many of its aims. One complaint: Dorrien might have said more about the nationalist cast of American individualism.

Joshua Kluever welcomed the book as a "much-needed corrective" to histories fixated on the Socialist Party's white, male leadership. Its author, Kluever wrote, "appears to hit his stride" with less familiar figures. The volume of evidence struck him as "impressive and often overwhelming," and Dorrien, he noted, repeatedly lays his politics "on the table." But naming World War I the "apex" of American socialism "really sucks the air out of the next five hundred pages." Still, he described it "a rich text," one he could "easily see being assigned as the main monograph for a class on US or American socialism."

Hari Kunzru, in The New York Review of Books, set the book against America's long habit of treating socialism as foreign and argued that the tradition Dorrien recovers came from the very national values it is accused of subverting. He called Dorrien "resolutely unmodish" in his choice of story (savoring the aside that "nobody got famous on market socialism") but thought that the socialist left emerging from the book "deserves more attention."

Writing in Tikkun, Aaron K. Stauffer called the book "expansive, brilliant," and at points "punchy," arriving at a hinge moment for the left. He pressed on its theology: Dorrien's tour of market socialism, he argued, hands churches "a theological opportunity" to rethink how they "do" church, recasting the cooperative-economy movement as the living heir of the Social Gospel's cooperative commonwealth.
