= Louis Pojman =

American philosopher (1935–2005)

- Born: April 22, 1935
- Died: October 15, 2005 (aged 70)
- Spouse: Trudy Pojman
- Children: 2

Education
- Education: Morton College; Nyack College (BS); New Brunswick Theological Seminary (BD); Union Theological Seminary (PhD); University of Copenhagen; University of Hamburg; University of Oxford (DPhil)
- Theses: A Philosophy of Negro Culture (1967); Faith and Reason in Soren Kierkegaard's Thought (1977)
- Doctoral advisor: Reinhold Niebuhr

Philosophical work
- Institutions: University of Oxford; University of Notre Dame; University of Texas at Dallas; University of Mississippi; Brigham Young University; University of California, Berkeley; CUNY Graduate Center; New York University; United States Military Academy; Princeton University; Clare Hall, Cambridge
- Main interests: Applied ethics; Philosophy of religion
- Website: louispojman.com

Louis Paul Pojman (/ˈpɔɪmən/ April 22, 1935 – October 15, 2005) was an American philosopher and professor, whose name is most recognized as the author of dozens of philosophy texts and anthologies, which continue to be used widely for educational purposes, and more than one-hundred papers, which he read at some sixty universities around the world. Pojman was known for his work in applied ethics and philosophy of religion.

== Education ==
Throughout his lifetime, Pojman attended multiple institutions of higher education. He began his post-secondary education in Cicero, Illinois attending Morton College. He went on to earn a Bachelor of Science at Nyack College and a Bachelor of Divinity at New Brunswick Theological Seminary and became an ordained minister in the Reformed Church of America. In 1965 he began attending Union Theological Seminary in New York where he studied under professor Reinhold Niebuhr. In 1972 he earned a doctorate in ethics. Following his time at Union Theological, he decided to study analytic philosophy at the University of Oxford from which he earned his doctorate in 1977. His accompanying dissertation is entitled Faith and Reason in Soren Kierkegaard's Thought.

== Career ==
Pojman was a Lecturer in Philosophy at Oxford University from 1973–1977, and an assistant professor at the University of Notre Dame and the University of Texas at Dallas from 1977–79 and 1979–84, respectively. Following his time at Dallas, he taught at the University of Mississippi from 1984–1986 as an associate professor, then as a professor and chair of the Philosophy Department from 1986–1995. His last major position was held at the United States Military Academy as Professor of Philosophy (1995–2004), after which he retired as Professor of Philosophy, Emeritus.

Along with full-time employment, Pojman held visiting positions at City University of New York Graduate Center (1989–1991), New York University (1990–1991), University of California, Berkeley (1993–1994), Brigham Young University (1998), Princeton University (2001), and Cambridge University (2004–2005).

== Personal life ==
Pojman was an anti-war and civil rights activist during the 1960s as well as a vegetarian and environmentalist. His family includes two children and grandchildren, and his wife of forty-three years, Trudy Pojman. He died surrounded by his family on October 15, 2005.

== Writings ==
Louis Pojman was the author or editor of 34 books and over 100 articles, including:

- "The Logic of Subjectivity: Kierkegaard's Philosophy of Religion" (1984)
- "Religious Belief and the Will" (1986)
- "The Abortion Controversy" (2nd ed. 1998)
- "Global Environmental Ethics" (1999)
- "Life and Death: Grappling with the Moral Dilemmas of Our Time" (2nd ed. 2000)
- "Environmental Ethics: Readings in Theory and Application" (6th ed. 2011) [Co-author Paul Pojman (d. 2012)]
- "The Moral Life: A Reader in Moral Philosophy" (5th ed. 2014) [Co-author Lewis Vaughn]
- "Justice" (2006)
- "Who Are We? Theories of Human Nature" (2006)
- "How Should We Live? An Introduction to Ethics" (2005)
- "Philosophy of Religion" (1998; re-issued in 2009)
- "Philosophy: The Classics" (3rd ed. 2011) [Co-author Lewis Vaughn]
- "Philosophy of Religion: An Anthology" (6th ed., 2012) [Co-author Michael Rea]
- "Ethics: Discovering Right and Wrong" (8th ed., 2012) [Co-author James Fieser]
- "Terrorism, Human rights, and The Case for World Government" (2006)
- "Egoism and Altruism: A Critique of Ayn Rand" (2016)
- "Philosophy: The Quest for Truth" (12th ed. 2023) [Co-author Lewis Vaughn]

== See also ==
- Moral absolutism
