= The Nature and Destiny of Man =

1943 book by Reinhold Niebuhr

The Nature and Destiny of Man: A Christian Interpretation
- Title page for The Nature and Destiny of Man: A Christian Interpretation (1943)
- Author: Reinhold Niebuhr
- Language: English
- Publication date: 1943
- Publication place: United States
- Media type: Print

The Nature and Destiny of Man: A Christian Interpretation (two volumes, 1943) is one of the important works of the American theologian Reinhold Niebuhr. The book is partly based on his 1939 Gifford Lectures. In 1998, the Modern Library ranked it the 18th-greatest non-fiction book of the 20th century.

== Contents ==
Reinhold Niebuhr deals with profound issues such as human nature, history, and the end of history. Niebuhr begins by arguing that the Christian view of human nature, compared with alternative views, is more complete and offers more explanatory power. According to the Christian view, human beings are made in the image of God. Unlike alternative views that establish a good and bad duality between mind and body, in the Christian view, both mind and body are good because both are created by God. People are made to live in harmony with others and God's will but violate this harmony when they inevitably make themselves the center and source of meaning for their lives.

Humans have tremendous creative and imaginative powers, and their minds can transcend both themselves (since they can make their own thoughts the object of contemplation) and the natural world (since they can manipulate natural forces to create new possibilities and vitalities of nature). Because people cannot find ultimate meaning in what they can transcend, they cannot find ultimate meaning within themselves or in the natural world. This is why people turn to religion.

Christianity is a religion of revelation, meaning that Christians believe that God must speak to people in order for them to arrive at a correct understanding of the divine nature and will. If the Bible is to be believed, God spoke to people throughout history but the divine message was not clearly understood. Because of human misunderstanding, and because God's law is so radically different from human law, Jesus' message was highly offensive to his listeners. What Jesus told people is that God overcomes evil not by destroying evildoers but by taking their evil upon himself. God's love is suffering love.
