= Ursula Niebuhr =

English American academic and theologian (1907–1997)

Ursula Mary Niebuhr (née Keppel-Compton; August 3, 1907 – January 10, 1997) was an English American academic and theologian. She was the founder and longtime head of the Department of Religion at Barnard College in New York City, US.

== Early life and education ==
She was born in Southampton, England. After graduation from the University of Oxford with double Firsts in history and theology, she became the first woman to win a fellowship to the Union Theological Seminary in New York, US.

== Marriage ==
In 1931, Ursula, the younger daughter of Dr. and Mrs. Keppel-Compton of Woodhall Spa in Lincolnshire, England and Rapallo in northern Italy, married Reinhold Niebuhr in Winchester, England. The couple made New York City their home during the majority of their 40 years together. The Niebuhrs had two children, Christopher and Elisabeth (later Sifton). The marriage, which lasted until his death in 1971, was said to have been marked by theological debates. Ursula left evidence in her professional papers at the Library of Congress showing that she co-authored some of her husband's later writings.

== Career ==
As a lay minister in the 1930s, she was preaching in Anglican churches and raising questions about the role of women in the church.

Beginning as a lecturer in 1940, she was a member of the Barnard College faculty for twenty years, retiring in the 1960s.

== Selected works ==
- 1957 -- "A memorandum on certain reading and spelling difficulties for my academic colleagues, teachers, parents and anyone else." Westport, Connecticut: Orton Society. OCLC 1234375
- 1981 -- Remembering Niebuhr: letters of Reinhold and Ursula M. Niebuhr. San Francisco: Harper & Row. OCLC 246795572
