= Kantian Reason and Hegelian Spirit: The Idealistic Logic of Modern Theology =

2012 book by Gary Dorrien

- Cover
- Author: Gary Dorrien
- Language: English
- Subject: Liberal theology, German idealism, History of Christianity
- Publisher: Wiley-Blackwell
- Publication date: February 27, 2012
- Publication place: United States
- Media type: Hardcover, ebook, softcover, audio
- Pages: 605
- Awards: PROSE Award in Theology and Religious Studies (2012)
- ISBN: 978-0-470-67331-7
- OCLC: 761380855
- Dewey Decimal: 230.0903
- LC Class: BT28 .D67 2012

Kantian Reason and Hegelian Spirit: The Idealistic Logic of Modern Theology is a 2012 book by American social ethicist and theologian Gary Dorrien. Dorrien investigates the influence of Immanuel Kant and post-Kantian idealism on Protestant theology in Germany and Great Britain from the late eighteenth century through the mid-twentieth century. He argues that modern religious thought originated with idealistic convictions about the spiritual ground and unifying reality of freedom, and that the major theological movements of the period, from Friedrich Schleiermacher and G. W. F. Hegel through the Ritschlian School to Karl Barth and Paul Tillich, defined themselves in relation to Kantian and post-Kantian ideas. The book also addresses liberal theology's involvement with nationalism, imperialism, and white supremacism. It received the 2012 PROSE Awards in Theology and Religious Studies from the Association of American Publishers.

== Summary ==
Dorrien investigates the role of Kantian and post-Kantian idealism in founding modern theology, tracing the development of what came to be called "liberal" theology in Germany and "modernist" theology in Great Britain.

The book advances two interrelated arguments: a descriptive claim that modern religious thought originated with idealistic convictions about the spiritual ground and unifying reality of freedom, and a normative claim that progressive theology requires such idealistic conviction. The German philosophical and theological tradition dominates the narrative, reflecting the historical reality that German thinkers led modern theology from its eighteenth-century origins through the twentieth-century reaction against liberalism, while British theology enters the account primarily through its engagement with German idealism. The book confines itself to Protestant theology in Germany and England and does not examine the idealist legacy in the Roman Catholic tradition.

Dorrien opens with a discussion of the early Enlightenment attempts in Britain and Germany to blend Enlightenment reason with a Christian worldview. He argues that early rationalism and empiricism did not adequately address questions of subjectivity, historical relativity, and freedom, and therefore did not develop a truly liberal approach to theology. The author then moves to Immanuel Kant's three critiques of reason and his writings on religion and ethics, presenting Kant as the quintessential modern philosopher whose critical idealism launched rival streams of theology and post-Kantian philosophy. He also discusses Johann Gottlieb Fichte's radicalization of Kantian subjectivity and the atheism controversy that ended his career at Jena. Then Dorrien turns to Friedrich Schleiermacher, presenting him as the greatest exemplar of post-Kantian theology, who grounded religion in the feeling of absolute dependence, alongside the earlier contributions of John Locke to British religious thought and Samuel Taylor Coleridge's role in introducing German idealism to England.

A substantial portion of the book studies the development of absolute idealism through F. W. J. Schelling and G. W. F. Hegel. The author focuses on Hegel's Phenomenology of Spirit and his philosophy of religion. The treatment of Hegel features a dynamic panentheist reading of his religious thought and argues for the primacy of negation in Hegel's dialectic, against recent scholarship that attempts to separate Hegel's philosophy from his metaphysical and religious commitments. The narrative then addresses the mid-nineteenth-century complications of the Hegelian tradition, examining David Friedrich Strauss's controversial claim that the gospels are pervaded by myth and the emergence of Left Hegelianism, alongside Søren Kierkegaard's rejection of liberal modes of subsuming the individual within dialectic, historical mediation, or philosophical system. The author also mentions the mediating theologians who attempted to blend Schleiermacher and Hegel while building a new theological establishment in Germany.

Then, the author proceeds to discuss neo-Kantian historicism and the Ritschlian School, which dominated German theology from the 1880s to World War I. The chapter on the Ritschlian School charts what the author insists was the collapse rather than the pinnacle of modern liberalism, though it retraces the development of Ritschlianism back to nineteenth-century achievements in critical biblical scholarship. Albrecht Ritschl championed historical criticism and envisioned the gospel as fundamentally social. His three most influential followers took his ideas in different directions. Adolf von Harnack became the public face of liberal Protestant theology. Wilhelm Herrmann founded the Ritschlian School as a movement and stressed the living Christ known through personal encounter. Ernst Troeltsch pushed Ritschlian historicism to its breaking point through his history of religions approach, forcing hard questions about how Christianity relates to other faiths. Troeltsch, not Harnack, emerges as the more significant figure for modern theology's future.

The discussion of British theology traces the development of idealism from the Lux Mundi circle of Anglo-Catholic theologians who legitimized biblical criticism and evolutionary theory in 1889, through religious philosophers such as Andrew Seth Pringle-Pattison and Hastings Rashdall who sought to correct British absolute idealism in a more personalist direction, to William Temple's engagement with Alfred North Whitehead's process-relational thought. Dorrien argues that British theologians maintained their commitment to idealism longer than their German counterparts, partly because they lacked the traumatic experience of World War I that discredited German liberal theology.

The argument converges on the Barthian revolt against liberal theology in the 1920s and 1930s. Karl Barth's crisis theology emerged from his disillusionment upon witnessing his German teachers endorse the Kaiser's war policy in 1914—a betrayal that convinced him liberal theology had fatally compromised itself by accommodating cultural trends. The book treats this theological rupture as the defining turn in twentieth-century Protestant thought, though it foregrounds the ironies attending this revolution: Barth's crisis theology channeled the disillusioned postwar Zeitgeist even as it condemned liberal theology for baptizing the spirit of its own age. The account extends to Paul Tillich, whose theological system drew on Schelling, Hegel, and the broader idealist tradition to construct what became the principal systematic alternative to Barthian neo-orthodoxy. In these later sections, Dorrien explains how Rudolf Bultmann and fellow crisis theologians generated new iterations of liberal theology under different nomenclature, perpetuating what they proclaimed defunct. Barth emerges as the most formidable Protestant theologian since Schleiermacher, while Tillich is credited with rendering theological questions intelligible to secularizing audiences increasingly estranged from institutional Christianity.

== Critical reception ==
Cyril O'Regan praised the work as "distinguished by both its intellectual competence and its narrative power." The uncommonly detailed portraits of major religious thinkers, he added, bespoke thorough command of their complete oeuvre. The book, O'Regan wrote, amounted to "a kind of obituary for a specifically modern form of theology." It contended that liberal theology reached its terminus in the mid-twentieth century; it further laid bare the tradition's persistent incoherence and estrangement from historical reality. He praised the successful treatment of Kierkegaard, in which biographical elements were seamlessly woven into an outstanding engagement with the main texts, but found the treatment of Coleridge less successful because it did not establish whether the later Coleridge was an important religious thinker in his own right or merely a translator of German idealism. O'Regan queried whether the aspiration to weave a single narrative—rather than two parallel strands—had been fully realized. He adduced a telling disparity: of the English theologians treated, Pringle-Pattison alone had read Hegel at first hand.

Evan F. Kuehn described the work as a sweeping narrative that should have a lasting impact on the field of historical theology. Kuehn praised its ability to balance historical diversity with systematic coherence and its successful shift of the centre of gravity for liberal theology away from both the Enlightenment and Ritschlianism toward German and British idealism. He commended the attention given to white supremacist logic in the idealist tradition, though he observed that the book lacked "a robust account of the development of liberal politics between the racialism of Kant and the later shift toward egalitarianism." Kuehn identified a structural shortcoming in that unifying liberalism, modernism, and idealism created loose ends. He also noted the curious isolation of Schleiermacher in the overall narrative.

Stephen Palmquist called the work "a masterpiece of intellectual history." He noted its encyclopedic breadth. He also praised its clarity and attention to detail. Palmquist pointed to the book's distinctive method: weaving biographical material from each figure's personal life into the account of their ideas. He suggested that more emphasis on evaluating the logic of the figures and ideas would have better justified the subtitle. Palmquist identified some omissions, including the absence of Arthur Schopenhauer and contemporary theologians such as Wolfhart Pannenberg, and found the treatment of Kant's Religion within the Bounds of Bare Reason too brief at only three pages. He suggested that "if German idealism erred in reading Kant via Fichte and Jacobi", then "a new Kantian philosophical theology is possible" which the book did not consider.

Nathan R. Strunk called the work "an absolute must for theology students," and praised its thoroughness and the cogency of its arguments. The volume, he remarked, disclosed a consistent pattern: every major theological position from Schleiermacher to Barth established its coordinates by negotiating its relation to Kantian and post-Kantian thought.Strunk observed that confining the analysis to select contested facets of German idealism would have afforded greater precision. He conceded, however, that the volume's exhaustive scope constituted a merit in its own right.

David S. Robinson commended the vivid biographical detail that brought major figures to life and appreciated the parallel presentation of German and British legacies. Robinson praised the work as "a masterful presentation of the complex idealist legacy" that combined extensive scholarship with a surprisingly readable narrative. He thought that the book responsibly acknowledged the contradictions in enlightened figures, and regularly raised the troubling legacy of white supremacism and de-Judaised Christianity. He suggested, however, that the author might have more thoroughly questioned how "standard European bigotries" could so regularly coincide with the idealist logic being commended.

R. David Nelson deemed the work indispensable for students and scholars occupied with theology's fortunes in modernity. Its research, he affirmed, was exhaustive, its prose lucid. Nelson valued the author's candor concerning his sympathy for and fidelity to the liberal theological tradition. The work's sole appreciable defect, in his estimation, lay in the triumphalism coloring this partisanship. The liberal tradition's foremost antagonists, Nelson remarked, never wholly extricated themselves from idealism's governing premises—a pattern visible in Kierkegaard above all, and subsequently in Barth and the neo-orthodox. Nelson accorded the work high praise for its lucidity and the author's assured grasp of the sources. He ventured, however, that "there are good reasons to detect in the flowering of the Kantian tradition the makings of a great tragedy in the history of ideas."
