= Moral Man and Immoral Society =

1932 book by Reinhold Niebuhr

- First edition cover
- Author: Reinhold Niebuhr
- Language: English
- Subjects: Liberalism; sin; pacifism
- Published: 1932 (Charles Scribner's Sons)
- Publication place: United States
- Media type: Print

Moral Man and Immoral Society: A Study in Ethics and Politics is a 1932 book by Reinhold Niebuhr, an American Protestant theologian. The thesis of the book is that people are more likely to sin as members of groups than as individuals. The book attacks liberalism, both secular and religious, and is particularly critical of John Dewey and the Social Gospel.

Niebuhr wrote the book in a single summer. He drew the book's contents from his experiences as a pastor in Detroit, Michigan prior to his professorship at Union Theological Seminary. Moral Man and Immoral Society generated much controversy and raised Niebuhr's public profile significantly. Initial reception of the book by liberal Christian critics was negative, but its reputation soon improved as the rise of fascism throughout the 1930s was seen as having been predicted in the book. Soon after the book's publication, Paul Lehmann gave a copy to Dietrich Bonhoeffer, who read it and was impressed by the book's thesis but disliked the book's critique of pacifism. The book eventually gained significant readership among American Jews because, after a period of considerable anti-theological sentiment among Jews in the United States, many Jews began to return to the study of theology and, having no Jewish works of theology to read, turned to Protestant theological works.

== See also ==
- Groupthink
