= The Yale Book of Quotations =

American literary work

- Editor: Fred R. Shapiro
- Publication date: 2006
- Pages: 1067
- ISBN: 978-0-300-10798-2

The Yale Book of Quotations is a quotations collection focusing on modern and American quotations. Edited by Fred R. Shapiro, it was published by Yale University Press in 2006 with a foreword by Joseph Epstein, ISBN 978-0-300-10798-2. Prior to publication it was referred to by its working title, The Yale Dictionary of Quotations. The book presents over 12,000 quotations on 1,067 pages. It is arranged alphabetically by author (or, for some quotations, by quotation type), with some information as to the source of each quotation and, where the editor deems this relevant, cross-references to other quotations. A keyword index allows the reader to generally find quotations by significant words in the quotations.

It was succeeded in 2021 by the revised and expanded New Yale Book of Quotations.

== Different focus ==
As described in its introduction, The Yale Book of Quotations is characterized by its greater focus, relative to its nearest competitors, Bartlett's Familiar Quotations and The Oxford Dictionary of Quotations, on modern American quotations, including those that do not have conventional literary sources. These include quotations from politicians, judges, journalists, sportscasters, athletes, screenwriters, songwriters, and anonymous sources. There are special sections for some kinds of quotations, including advertising slogans, film lines, folk and anonymous songs, political slogans, proverbs, and television catchphrases. There is also coverage of traditional literary sources. There are, for example, 400 quotations from the Bible, 106 quotations from Charles Dickens, 127 quotations from T. S. Eliot, 153 quotations from Mark Twain, and 455 quotations from William Shakespeare. This coverage is less extensive than that offered by Bartlett's, which provides 1,642 quotations from the Bible and 1,906 from Shakespeare.

== Research into origins ==
The Yale Book of Quotations' introduction describes the editor's attempts at research to identify many famous quotations, trace them to their original sources as far as possible, and record those sources as precisely and accurately as he could. In compiling the book, Shapiro made extensive use of online databases to find earlier or more precise information about quotations. He also used the Stumpers network of reference librarians and other research professionals; and the American Dialect Society electronic mailing list, as well as traditional library research. Shapiro claims that, to ensure that famous quotations were included, he reviewed more than a thousand previous quotations collections and other types of anthologies, read the alt.quotations newsgroup and other Internet and online resources for a while, and consulted experts on famous authors and types of literature.

== Correcting misattributions ==
Shapiro's research resulted in some interesting findings, on occasion correcting misattributions elsewhere. The following are representative:

- It was the Earl of Sandwich and the English actor and playwright Samuel Foote who had the exchange "I think, that you must either die of the p-x, or the halter." "My lord, that will depend upon one of two contingencies; whether I embrace your lordship's mistress, or your lordship's principles." The Yale Book of Quotations traces this to an 1809 source. Bartlett's Familiar Quotations attributed the exchange to Sandwich and John Wilkes, based upon a 1935 book.
- "Go West, young man" was indeed by Horace Greeley. As The Yale Book of Quotations describes in a detailed note, many reference works, including Bartlett's and The Oxford Dictionary of Quotations, wrongly attribute it to John Soule.
- "There ain't no such thing as a free lunch" is traced to the Reno Evening Gazette on January 22, 1942, in the form "such a thing as a 'free' lunch never existed." Such a finding would have been unlikely without the use of electronic databases. (Subsequent to the publication of the book, Shapiro reported the discovery of a 1938 use of the phrase.)
- The remark that Fred Astaire "was great, but don't forget that Ginger Rogers did everything he did, . . . backwards and in high heels" has been attributed to Ann Richards, Linda Ellerbee, or Faith Whittlesey. Shapiro found that the earliest reference was in the Frank and Ernest comic strip on May 3, 1982, and he contacted the strip's creator, Bob Thaves, to confirm that Thaves was the originator.

== See also ==
- Bartlett's Familiar Quotations
- The Oxford Dictionary of Quotations
- Wikiquote
