= Vergilius Ferm =

American philosopher (1896–1974)

Vergilius Ture Anselm Ferm (January 6, 1896, Sioux City, Iowa – February 4, 1974, Wooster, Ohio) was the Compton professor of philosophy at the College of Wooster.

== Selected published works ==
- Contemporary American theology (1932) [2 vols.]
- "Theology and Religious Experience" (pp. 26–43) in The Nature of Religious Experience: Essays in Honor of Douglas Clyde Macintosh (1937)
- Religion In Transition (1937)
- An encyclopedia of religion (1945)
- What Can We Believe? (1948)
- Religion in the twentieth century (1948)
- Ancient Religions: A Symposium (1950)
- A history of philosophical systems (1950)
- Ancient religions (1950)
- A Protestant dictionary (1951)
- The Protestant credo (1953)
- A dictionary of pastoral psychology (1955)
- Pictorial history of Protestantism (1957)
- A Brief Dictionary of American Superstitions (1959)
- Classics of Protestantism (1959)
- Toward an expansive Christian theology (1964)
- Living schools of religion (1965)
- Encyclopedia of morals (1969)
- Cross-currents in the personality of Martin Luther; a study in the psychology of religious genius (1972)
- Philosophy beyond the classroom (1974)
- Lightning never strikes twice (if you own a feather bed): and 1904 other American superstitions from the ordinary to the eccentric (1989)
