= Gary Dorrien =

American social ethicist and theologian (born 1952)

The Reverend Gary Dorrien
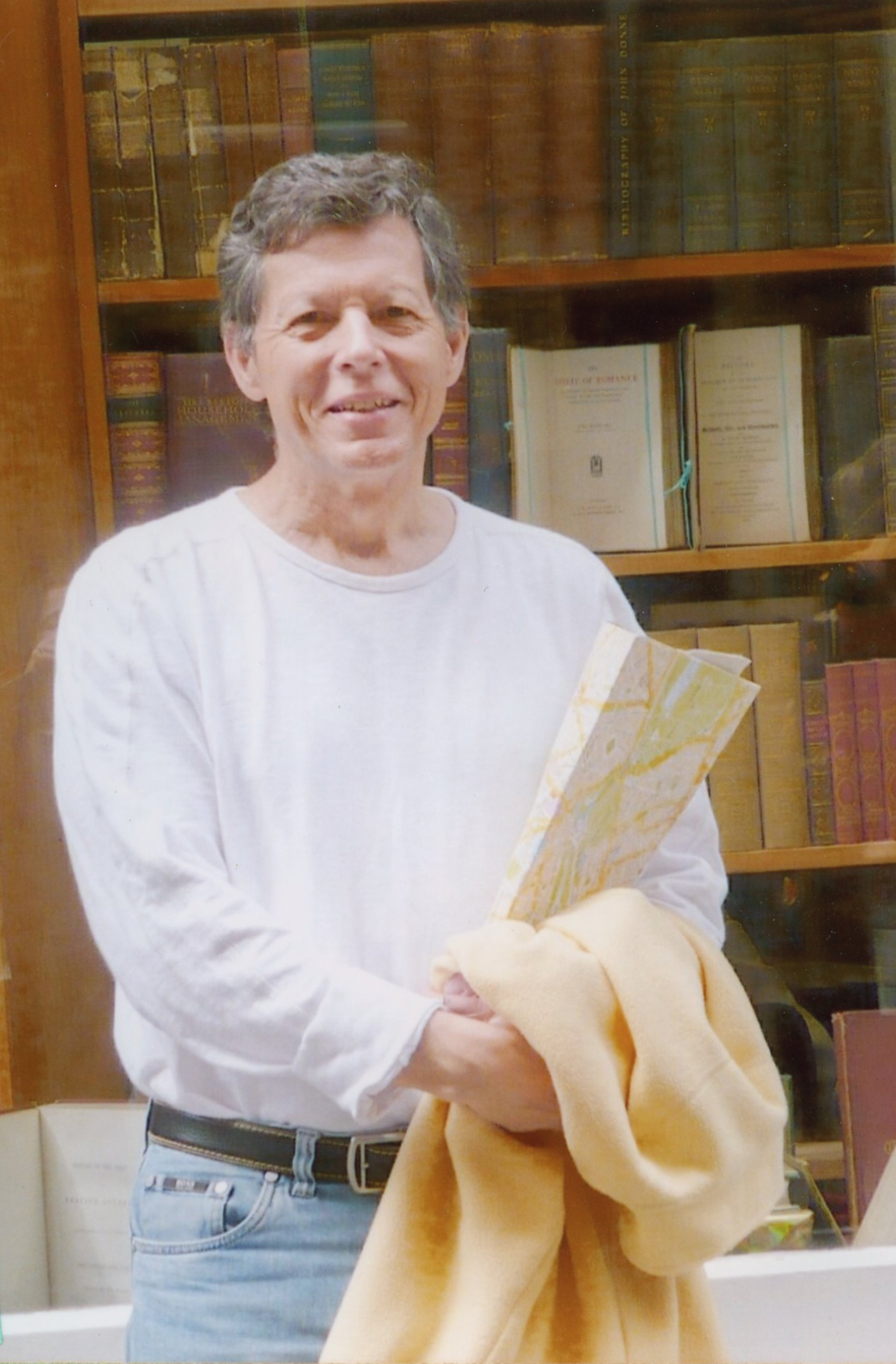
- Dorrien in 2023
- Born: Gary John Dorrien; March 21, 1952 (age 74)
- Spouse: Brenda L. Biggs (m. 1979; died 2000)
- Partner: Eris McClure
- Children: 1
- Awards: Grawemeyer Award for Religion (2017)

Ecclesiastical career
- Religion: Christianity (Anglican)
- Church: Episcopal Church
- Ordained: December 18, 1982 (priest)

Academic background
- Education: Alma College; Union Theological Seminary; Princeton Theological Seminary; Union Institute
- Thesis: Transformations of Modernity (1989)
- Influences: Reinhold Niebuhr

Academic work
- Discipline: Religious studies; theology
- Sub-discipline: Christian ethics
- School or tradition: Theological liberalism
- Institutions: Kalamazoo College; Union Theological Seminary; Columbia University
- Notable works: The Making of American Liberal Theology (2001–2006); The New Abolition (2015)

Gary John Dorrien (born March 21, 1952) is an American social ethicist, theologian, and intellectual historian. He is the Reinhold Niebuhr Professor of Social Ethics at Union Theological Seminary in the City of New York and Professor of Religion at Columbia University, both in New York City, and the author of more than two dozen books and over 300 articles on ethics, social theory, philosophy, theology, politics, and intellectual history. His books have received the Grawemeyer Award in Religion, the PROSE Award of the Association of American Publishers, and the American Library Association's Choice Award three times.

Prior to joining the faculty at Union and Columbia in 2005, Dorrien taught for eighteen years at Kalamazoo College in Michigan, where he served as Parfet Distinguished Professor, Dean of Stetson Chapel, and Director of the Liberal Arts Colloquium.

An Episcopal priest, he has taught as the Paul E. Raither Distinguished Scholar at Trinity College in Hartford, Connecticut, the Horace De Y. Lentz Visiting Professor at Harvard Divinity School in Cambridge, Massachusetts, and the Lowell Visiting Professor at Boston University School of Theology. In 2026 he was installed as a canon theologian of the Cathedral of St. John the Divine in New York City.

== Early life and education ==
Dorrien was born on March 21, 1952, and grew up in a working-class, semi-rural area of Bay County and in nearby Midland, in mid-Michigan. His parents, Jack and Virginia Dorrien, came from poor families in Michigan's Upper Peninsula; his father was of part-Cree heritage. The family was nominally Catholic. Dorrien has traced his religious formation to the image of the crucified Jesus in Catholic iconography and to the example of civil rights leader Martin Luther King Jr. In his memoir he recalled that after King was assassinated, "the crucifix story and the King story folded together in my mind and feeling. That was the crux of whatever theology I held at the end of my high school years; all these years later, it still is."

Dorrien played multiple varsity sports at Midland High School and Alma College, graduating summa cum laude from Alma in 1974. He enrolled at Harvard Divinity School in the fall of 1974, supporting himself with night work as a university security guard and later as a building superintendent, and joined Michael Harrington's Democratic Socialist Organizing Committee at a Harvard lecture that same year. After the death of his younger brother in December 1976, he transferred to Union Theological Seminary, where he studied under biblical scholar Raymond E. Brown and completed a Master of Divinity in 1978. He earned a Master of Arts and a Master of Theology from Princeton Theological Seminary in 1979, and a Doctor of Philosophy from Union Graduate School in 1989. He has received honorary doctorates from MacMurray College (DLitt, 2005), Trinity College (DD, 2010), Meadville Lombard Theological School (LHD, 2015), Virginia Theological Seminary (DD, 2020), Wake Forest University (DD, 2024), and Alma College (LHD, 2025).

== Career ==
Dorrien was ordained to the Episcopal priesthood on December 18, 1982. During the 1980s he served as a pastor in Albany, New York, and worked as an organizer and public speaker for social justice organizations, combining parish ministry with labor organizing and Central America solidarity work. He wrote his first three books during these years.

He began his academic career at Kalamazoo College in 1987. Over eighteen years there he served as Dean of Stetson Chapel and Director of the Liberal Arts Colloquium, and in 2001 was named the college's first Parfet Distinguished Professor. In 2005 he joined Union Theological Seminary as the Reinhold Niebuhr Professor of Social Ethics and Columbia University as Professor of Religion.

Dorrien served successively as vice president and president of the American Theological Society from 2003 to 2006, and was elected vice president of the Society of Christian Ethics in January 2025. On February 8, 2026, he was installed as a canon theologian at the Cathedral of St. John the Divine in New York City, alongside theologian Kelly Brown Douglas.

== Thought and work ==
Dorrien has described his writing as divided between a theological-philosophical project and a body of work in social ethics and politics. His major works on the theological-philosophical side include the three-volume The Making of American Liberal Theology (2001–2006), The Barthian Revolt in Modern Theology (2000), Kantian Reason and Hegelian Spirit (2012), In a Post-Hegelian Spirit (2020), The Spirit of American Liberal Theology (2023), and Anglican Identities (2024).

He has written that most of his theological work operates in "the disciplinary modes of intellectual history, historical theology, and philosophy of religion," and he characterizes his position as liberal in its engagement with critical questions of disbelief, liberationist in its opposition to structures of domination, and post-Hegelian in its religious philosophy.

His work in social ethics and political history includes Social Ethics in the Making (2008), a trilogy on the Black social gospel comprising The New Abolition (2015), Breaking White Supremacy (2017), and A Darkly Radiant Vision (2023), and two histories of democratic socialism, Social Democracy in the Making (2019) and American Democratic Socialism (2021). In Economy, Difference, Empire (2010), a collection of lectures, he described his method in social ethics as tying "together the descriptive 'about' and the normative 'should,' fusing historical analysis with arguments about the social ethical necessity of social justice politics." Several of his books developed out of his lecturing at universities, congregations, and civic events, including Imperial Designs (2004), which developed from his speaking against the U.S. invasion of Iraq, and The Obama Question (2012).

Dorrien’s two trilogies on American liberal theology and the Black social gospel stand at the center of his work. Intellectual historian J. David Hoeveler described The Making of American Liberal Theology as “a magnificent piece of scholarship” that exemplifies intellectual history at its best: “Liberal theology, as Dorrien treats it, interconnects with a wide range of ideas—in philosophy, science, and history most importantly, and other topical matters like feminism and race. This trilogy should attract the attention of intellectual historians not only for its rich content but also for the suggestions it has for this discipline itself; that is, for practicing intellectual history and recognizing some of the contrasting approaches to its subject matter. Charles Maynard called Dorrien "a towering figure in the field" of Christian social ethics.

Dorrien's memoir, Over from Union Road: My Christian-Left-Intellectual Life, was published by Baylor University Press in 2024. An excerpt appeared in Commonweal later. Charles Hoffacker quoted Dorrien's summary of his path: "I am a jock who began as a solidarity activist, became an Episcopal cleric at thirty, became an academic at thirty-five, and never quite settled on a field, so now I explore the intersections of too many fields."

== Personal life ==
Dorrien married Brenda L. Biggs, a Presbyterian minister, in 1979; she died of cancer in 2000. Their daughter, Sara Biggs Dorrien-Christians, is a Presbyterian pastor in Indianapolis, Indiana. His partner is Eris McClure.

== Awards ==
Dorrien won the American Library Association's Choice Award in 2009 for his book Social Ethics in the Making: Interpreting an American Tradition, which The Christian Century described as "magnificent, sprawling and monumental."

He won the Association of American Publishers' PROSE Award for excellence in theology and religious studies in 2012 for his book Kantian Reason and Hegelian Spirit: The Idealistic Logic of Modern Theology, described by Cyril O’Regan: “In its lucidity, comprehensiveness, and narrative power, Kantian Reason and Hegelian Spirit is without equal. One can only marvel.”

He won the Grawemeyer Award in Religion in 2017 for his book The New Abolition: W. E. B. Du Bois and the Black Social Gospel; the prize citation quoted theologian William Stacy Johnson, who called the book "a magisterial treatment of a neglected stream of American religious history presented by one of this generation's premier interpreters of modern religious thought operating at the top of his game."

He won the Choice Award for the second time in 2018 for his book Breaking White Supremacy: Martin Luther King Jr. and the Black Social Gospel, which Choice described as "intellectual history at its finest...A triumph of careful scholarship, rigorous argument, clear prose, unblinking judgments and groundbreaking conclusions…indispensable."

In 2020 he received the Harper Lifetime Achievement Award from Cooperative Metropolitan Ministries in Boston, Massachusetts.

He won the Choice Award for the third time in 2022 for his book American Democratic Socialism: History, Politics, Religion, and Theory, described in Current Affairs as "a masterpiece. American Democratic Socialism will be the definitive history for some time."

He was awarded the Gandhi King Mandela Peace Prize in 2024 at Morehouse College in Atlanta, Georgia. The prize citation commended his "distinguished teaching and magisterial, rigorous, monumental, and definitive scholarship that counter and disrupt White racist theology and ethical inquiry by centering the truths of Black life, Black Christian witness, and political imagination."

== Books ==
- Logic and Consciousness: The Dialectics of Mind, Hastings Press, 1985.
- The Democratic Socialist Vision, Rowman & Littlefield, 1986. ISBN 9780847675074
- Reconstructing the Common Good: Theology and the Social Order. Orbis Books (June 1990). ISBN 978-0-88344-659-1
- The Neoconservative Mind: Politics, Culture, and the War of Ideology, Temple University Press, 1993, 1994. ISBN 9781566390194
- Soul in Society: The Making and Renewal of Social Christianity, Fortress Press, 1995. ISBN 9780800628918
- The Word as True Myth: Interpreting Modern Theology, Westminster John Knox Press, 1997. ISBN 9780664257453
- The Remaking of Evangelical Theology, Westminster John Knox Press, 1998. ISBN 9780664258030
- The Barthian Revolt in Modern Theology: Theology Without Weapons, Westminster John Knox Press, 2000. ISBN 9780664221515
- The Making of American Liberal Theology: Imagining Progressive Religion, 1805–1900 (v. 1). Westminster John Knox Press (October 1, 2001). ISBN 978-0-664-22354-0
- The Making of American Liberal Theology: Idealism, Realism, and Modernity, 1900–1950 (v. 2). Westminster John Knox Press (February 2003). ISBN 978-0-664-22355-7
- Imperial Designs: Neoconservatism and the New Pax Americana. Routledge (August 31, 2004). ISBN 978-0-415-94980-4
- The Making of American Liberal Theology: Crisis, Irony, and Postmodernity: 1950–2005 (v. 3). Westminster John Knox Press (November 1, 2006). ISBN 978-0-664-22356-4
- Social Ethics in the Making: Interpreting an American Tradition. Wiley-Blackwell (December 22, 2008). ISBN 978-1-4051-8687-2
- Economy, Difference, Empire: Social Ethics for Social Justice. Columbia University Press (October 2010). ISBN 978-0-231-14984-6
- Kantian Reason and Hegelian Spirit: The Idealistic Logic of Modern Theology. Wiley-Blackwell (April 17, 2012). ISBN 978-0470673317
- The Obama Question: A Progressive Perspective. Rowman & Littlefield, 2012. ISBN 978-1-4422-1537-5
- The New Abolition: W. E. B. Du Bois and the Black Social Gospel. Yale University Press, 2015. ISBN 978-0-300-20560-2
- Breaking White Supremacy: Martin Luther King Jr. and the Black Social Gospel. Yale University Press, 2017. ISBN 978-0-300-20561-9
- Social Democracy in the Making: Political and Religious Roots of European Socialism. Yale University Press, 2019. ISBN 978-0300236026
- In a Post-Hegelian Spirit: Philosophical Theology as Idealistic Discontent. Baylor University Press, 2020. ISBN 978-1-4813-1159-5
- American Democratic Socialism: History, Politics, Religion, and Theory. Yale University Press, 2021. ISBN 9780300253764
- A Darkly Radiant Vision: The Black Social Gospel in the Shadow of MLK. Yale University Press, 2023. ISBN 9780300264524
- The Spirit of American Liberal Theology: A History. Westminster John Knox, 2023. ISBN 9780664268411
- Anglican Identities: Logos Idealism, Imperial Whiteness, Commonweal Ecumenism. Baylor University Press, 2024. ISBN 9781481320948
- Over from Union Road: My Christian-Left-Intellectual Life. Baylor University Press, 2024. ISBN 978-1-4813-2241-6

Awards
| Preceded by Susan R. Holman | Grawemeyer Award for Religion; 2017 | Succeeded by James H. Cone |
