= Daniel Migliore =

American theologian and author (1935–2026)

Daniel Leo Migliore (1935 – March 2, 2026) was an American Christian theologian and author. He was Professor Emeritus of Theology at Princeton Theological Seminary.

== Life and career ==
Daniel Leo Migliore was born in 1935. He held a Bachelor of Divinity degree from Princeton Theological Seminary and an M.A. and Ph.D. from Princeton University. Migliore received an honorary doctorate (humane letters) from his alma mater Westminster College (Pennsylvania). An ordained Presbyterian minister, he was a member of the Presbytery of New Brunswick and taught in local congregations. His areas of interest included systematic theology, Karl Barth, the Trinity, and Christology. During his career, he taught courses on Christology, the doctrine of God, the theology of Karl Barth, Barth's Church Dogmatics, and an introductory course on the doctrines and practices of Christian faith. He retired as Charles Hodge Professor of Systematic Theology at Princeton Theological Seminary in 2009.

Princeton Seminary established the Daniel L. Migliore Distinguished Presidential Award for Faithful Leadership in 2025.

Migliore died on March 2, 2026, at the age of 90.

== Publications ==
- Faith Seeking Understanding: An Introduction to Christian Theology (1980) (Third Edition, 2014)
- Called to Freedom: Liberation Theology and the Future of Christian Doctrine (1980) ISBN 9780664242893
- The Power of God (1983)
- The Church and Israel: Romans 9-11 (with Paul M. van Buren, Otfried Hofius and J. Christiaan Beker, 1990)
- The Lord's Prayer: Perspectives for Reclaiming Christian Prayer (1993)
- Hope for the Kingdom and Responsibility for the World (Princeton Theological Seminary, 1994)
- Protestant Theology at the Crossroads: How to Face the Crucial Tasks for Theology in the Twenty-First Century (with Gerhard Sauter, 2007)
- Rachel's Cry: Prayer of Lament and Rebirth of Hope (with Kathleen D. Billman, 2007) ISBN 9781556356292
- The Power of God and the Gods of Power (2008) ISBN 9780664231644
- (editor) Commanding Grace: Studies in Karl Barth's Ethics ISBN 9780802865700
- (editor) Reading the Gospels With Karl Barth (2017) ISBN 9780802873637
