= Fred R. Shapiro =

American editor

Fred Shapiro
- Born: April 19, 1954 (age 72); New York City, New York, U.S.

Academic background
- Education: Massachusetts Institute of Technology (BS); Catholic University of America (MLIS); Harvard University (JD)

Academic work
- Discipline: Library and information science Legal research
- Institutions: Yale Law School

Fred Richard Shapiro (born April 19, 1954) is an American legal scholar and academic working as the editor of The Yale Book of Quotations, The Oxford Dictionary of American Legal Quotations, and several other books.

== Education ==
Shapiro earned a Bachelor of Science degree from the Massachusetts Institute of Technology, a Master of Library Science from the Catholic University of America, and a Juris Doctor from Harvard Law School.

== Career ==
Shapiro has published numerous articles on language, law, and information science, including "The Politically Correct United States Supreme Court and the Motherfucking Texas Court of Appeals: Using Legal Databases to Trace the Origins of Words and Quotations" and "Who Wrote the Serenity Prayer". He is an associate librarian and lecturer in legal research at Yale Law School. His work in identifying sources of recent sayings is seen in The Dictionary of Modern Proverbs.
