= Franz Jozef van Beeck =

Dutch author, priest and Christian theologian

Frans Jozef Van Beeck or Franz Jozef van Beeck, also known as Joep van Beeck (June 11, 1930 – October 12, 2011), was a Dutch author and Christian theologian who was also a prominent priest of the Society of Jesus.

Born in Helmond, Netherlands, he entered the Jesuit religious order in 1948 after studies at the Jesuit Aloysius College in The Hague. He received a doctorate in English from the University of Amsterdam in 1961 and was ordained to the Roman Catholic priesthood in 1963. From 1968 to 1985, Van Beeck taught theology at Boston College in Boston, Massachusetts. He then moved to Loyola University Chicago in Chicago, Illinois where he served as John Cardinal Cody Professor of Theology until his retirement in 2002. From 2006 until his death, he resided in Nijmegen, Netherlands.

Van Beeck wrote hundreds of thousands of pages of letters, treatises and books used today in Christian colleges and universities throughout the world. His most famous theological work is an ambitious series of six books called God Encountered: A Contemporary Catholic Systematic Theology (Liturgical Press).

Some of his most controversial works considered the issues arising from World War II. Critics challenged van Beeck's attempt to define a single universal theme in the overall tragedy of the Holocaust. They believed that such an attempt to explain the Holocaust as a metaphor or symbol was dangerous and could lead to a minimalization of the horrors of the mass murder.

Van Beeck's Christ Proclaimed: Christology as Rhetoric (1979) is a significant synthesis of theological reflection in christology with a distinctive consideration of rhetoric and the Christian proclamation. Van Beeck's thought about rhetoric and proclamation culminated in the publication of the article "Divine Revelation: Intervention or Self-Communication" in Theological Studies 52 (1991): 199–226.

In 2006, Sacred Heart University Press published his Driven under the Influence: Selected Essays in Theology 1974–2004.
