= Crown Him with Many Crowns =

Lyrical hymn by Matthew Bridges

- Genre: Hymn
- Written: 1851
- Text: Matthew Bridges, Godfrey Thring
- Based on: Revelation 19:12
- Meter: 6.6.8.6 D
- Melody: "'Diademata" by Sir George Job Elvey

"Crown Him with Many Crowns" is an 1851 hymn with lyrics written by Matthew Bridges and Godfrey Thring and sung to the tune 'Diademata' by Sir George Job Elvey. The hymn appears in many hymnals.

The full twelve verses of the song (which has two, six-verse versions, sharing the same melody and theme but different wording and theological points of interest) are as follows (the first six stanzas are those written by Bridges; the second six, written by Thring):

== Lyrics ==
Crown Him with Many Crowns
A church congregation singing the hymn to the tune Diademata

Crown him with many crowns,
The Lamb upon his throne;
Hark! how the heavenly anthem drowns
All music but its own:
Awake, my soul, and sing
Of him who died for thee,
And hail him as thy matchless king
Through all eternity.

Crown him the Virgin's Son!
The God Incarnate born,--
Whose arm those crimson trophies won
Which now his brow adorn!
Fruit of the mystic Rose
As of that Rose the Stem:
The Root, whence mercy ever flows,--
The Babe of Bethlehem!

Crown him the Lord of love!
Behold his hands and side,--
Rich wounds, yet visible above,
In beauty glorified:
No angel in the sky
Can fully bear that sight,
But downward bends his burning eye
At mysteries so bright!

Crown him the Lord of peace!
Whose power a scepter sways,
From pole to pole,--that wars may cease,
Absorbed in prayer and praise:
his reign shall know no end,
And round his pierced feet
Fair flowers of paradise extend
Their fragrance ever sweet.

Crown him the Lord of years!
The Potentate of time,--
Creator of the rolling spheres,
Ineffably sublime!
Glassed in a sea of light,
Where everlasting waves
Reflect his throne,--the Infinite!
Who lives,--and loves--and saves.

Crown him the Lord of heaven!
One with the Father known,--
And the blest Spirit, through him given
From yonder triune throne!
All hail! Redeemer,--Hail!
For Thou hast died for me;
Thy praise shall never, never fail
Throughout eternity!

Crown him with crowns of gold,
All nations great and small,
Crown him, ye martyred saints of old,
The Lamb once slain for all;
The Lamb once slain for them
Who bring their praises now,
As jewels for the diadem
That girds his sacred brow.

Crown him the Son of God
Before the worlds began,
And ye, who tread where He hath trod,
Crown him the Son of Man;
Who every grief hath known
That wrings the human breast,
And takes and bears them for His own,
That all in him may rest.

Crown him the Lord of light,
Who o'er a darkened world
In robes of glory infinite
His fiery flag unfurled.
And bore it raised on high,
In heaven--in earth--beneath,
To all the sign of victory
O'er Satan, sin, and death.

Crown him the Lord of life
Who triumphed o'er the grave,
And rose victorious in the strife
For those he came to save;
His glories now we sing
Who died, and rose on high.
Who died, eternal life to bring
And lives that death may die.

Crown him of lords the Lord,
Who over all doth reign
Who once on earth, the incarnate Word,
For ransomed sinners slain,
Now lives in realms of light,
Where saints with angels sing
Their songs before him day and night,
Their God, Redeemer, king.

Crown him the Lord of heaven,
Enthroned in worlds above;
Crown him the king, to whom is given
The wondrous name of Love,
Crown him with many crowns,
As thrones before him fall.
Crown him, ye kings, with many crowns,
For He is King of all.

Amen!

== Inclusion in hymnals ==
The hymn appears in many hymnals, including the Baptist Hymnal (Southern Baptist Convention), the Book of Praise (Presbyterian Church in Canada), Baptist Praise and Worship, the Catholic Book of Worship (Canadian Conference of Catholic Bishops), the Chalice Hymnal (Christian Church (Disciples of Christ)), Common Praise (Anglican Church of Canada), Common Praise (Church of England), The Hymnal 1982 (Episcopal Church in the United States of America), Hymns and Psalms (Methodist Church of Great Britain), the Lutheran Book of Worship (several Lutheran denominations in North America), Mission Praise (interdenominational, UK), the New Catholic Hymnal (third-party-publisher hymnal in use in the Catholic church), The New Century Hymnal (United Church of Christ), the Presbyterian Hymnal (Presbyterian Church (U.S.A.)), Rejoice in the Lord (Reformed Church in America), Rejoice and Sing (United Reformed Church), the Church Hymnary (Church of Scotland), Together in Song (interdenominational), the United Methodist Hymnal (United Methodist Church), Voices United (United Church of Canada), The Worshiping Church (interdenominational), Worship (third-party-publisher hymnal in use in the Catholic church), and A New Hymnal for Colleges and Schools (interdenominational).
