= List of English-language hymnals by denomination =

Hymnals, also called hymnbooks (or hymn books) and occasionally hymnaries, are books of hymns sung by religious congregations. The following is a list of English-language hymnals by denomination.

== Liturgical churches ==
See note (Note: Note from the Wikipedia article Liturgy: Frequently in Christianity, a distinction is made between "liturgical" and "non-liturgical" churches based on how elaborate or formal the worship; in this usage, churches whose services are unscripted or improvised are called "non-liturgical". Others object to this distinction, arguing that this terminology obscures the universality of public worship as a religious phenomenon.) below.

=== Anglican ===
The hymnals of the Episcopal Church in the Philippines and The Hymnal, 1940, of the Protestant Episcopal Church.

The Hymnal 1940, of the Protestant Episcopal Church in the United States of America (PECUSA) and the Trial Hymnal of the Episcopal Church in the Philippines (ECP).

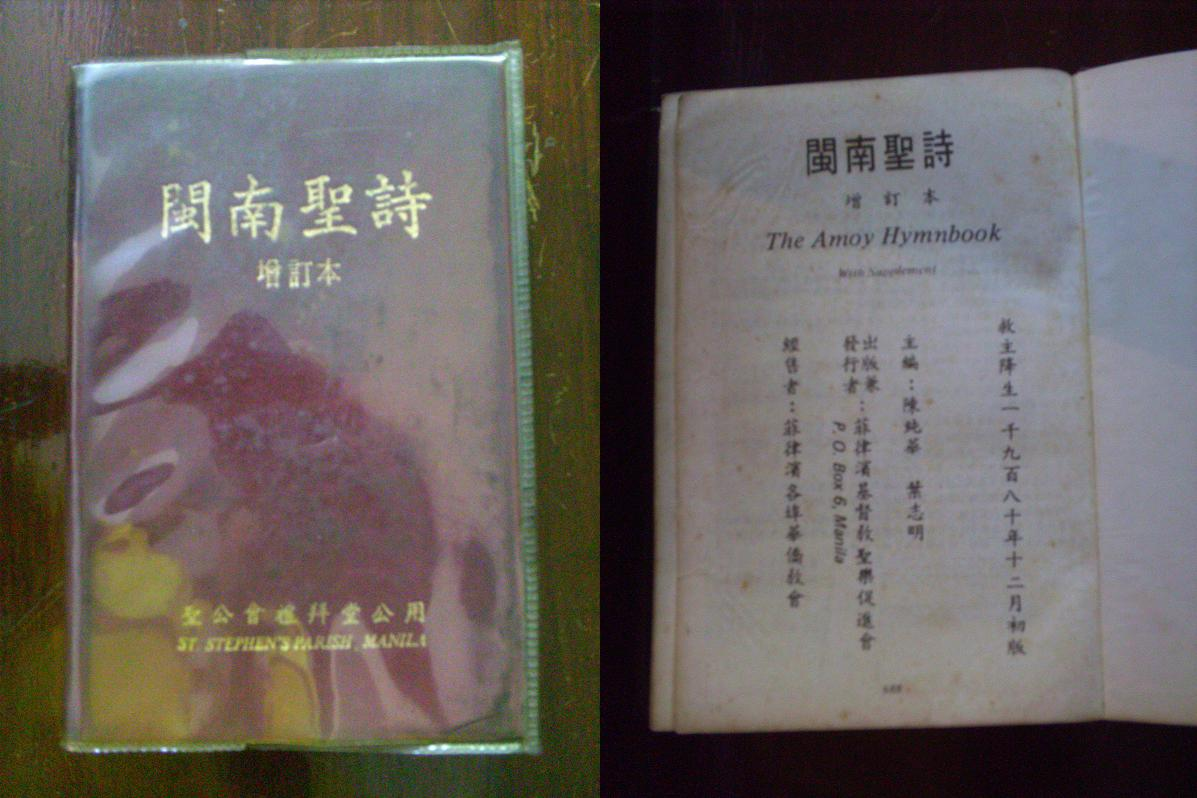
The Amoy Hymnal published by the Church of the Province of South East Asia.

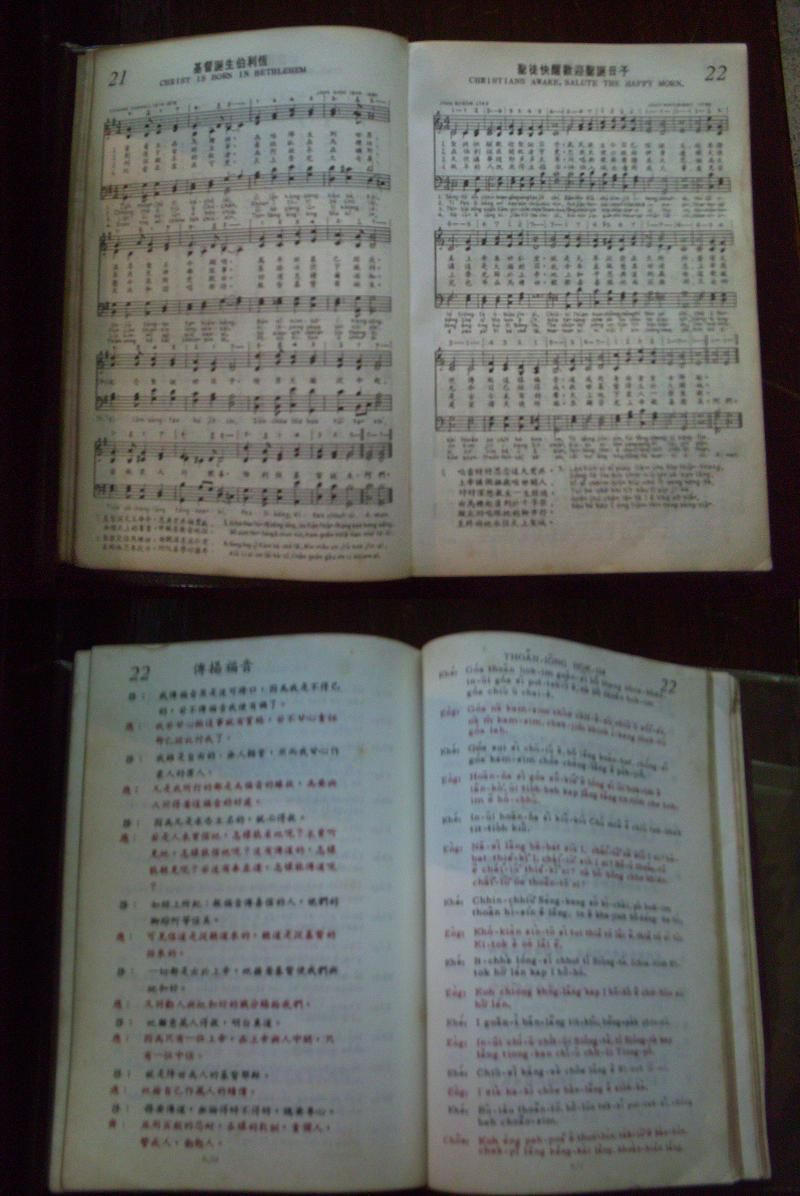
The Amoy Hymnbook showing a song and part of the service in English and Hokkien.

- Anglican Church of Canada
  - A Selection of Psalms and Hymns for Every Sunday and Principal Festival (1834)
  - A Selection of Psalms and Hymns (1835)
  - A Selection of Psalms, Hymns and Anthems (1842)
  - A Selection of Psalms and Hymns for Diocese of Nova Scotia (1859)
  - A Church Hymn Book (1861)
  - A Selection of Hymns for the Use of Church of England Sunday Schools (1862)
  - Hymns for Public Worship in the Diocese of Fredericton (1870)
  - Hymns for use in Sunday Schools (1871)
  - Church hymnal (1874)
  - Gems of Sacred Song for Sunday Schools (1875)
  - Church Hymnal (1877)
  - Jewel Selections (1881)
  - The Book of Common Praise being The Hymn Book of The Church of England in Canada (1908)
  - The Book of Common Praise (Revised) being The Hymn Book of The Church of England in Canada (1938)
  - Ancient Office Hymns, with Supplement, Additional Tunes” and Chant Appendix (Revised 1963)
  - The Hymn Book (1971), produced jointly with United Church of Canada
  - Sing (1972)
  - Common Praise (1998)
  - Sing a New Creation (2022)
- The Church in the Province of the West Indies
  - The CPWI Hymnal (2011)
- Anglican Church of Australia
  - Australian Hymn Book (1977)
  - Together in Song: Australian Hymn Book II (1999)
- Anglican Church in North America
  - Magnify the Lord - a 21st Century Anglican Hymnal (2020)
- Episcopal Church in the United States of America
  - New Version of the Psalms of David (1756)
  - The Whole Book of Psalms (1793)
  - Hymns, Selected from the Most Approved Authors, for the use of Trinity Church, Boston (1808)
  - Church Poetry (1823)
  - Hymns of the Protestant Episcopal Church in the United States of America (1828)
  - Introits: or Ante-Communion Psalms for the Sundays and Holy Days Throughout the Year (1844)
  - Hymns of the Protestant Episcopal Church of the United States (1845)
  - Ancient Hymns of Holy Church by John Williams (1845)
  - Christian Ballads (1847)
  - Hymns additional to the Hymns in the Prayer Book (1850)
  - A Selection of Psalms and Hymns, for the use of Sunday Schools (1850)
  - The Lecture-Room Hymn-Book: containing the psalms and hymns of the book of common prayer (1855)
  - The Infant-School Hymn-Book (1856)
  - A Collection of Hymns (1859)
  - A Collection of Sacred Song (1859)
  - Hymns for Church and Home (1860)
  - A Collection of Sacred Song (1861)
  - The Sunday School Service and Tune Book (1863)
  - Selections from the Psalms of David in Metre (1865)
  - Chants, Carols and Tunes (1865)
  - Palm Leaves: a collection of Sunday school tunes and carols (1865)
  - The Sailors' Manual of Devotion (1865)
  - The Sunday School Chant and Tune Book (1866)
  - Additional Hymns set forth by the House of Bishops at the request of the House of Clerical and Lay Deputies (1866)
  - Daily Hymns: 32nd Anniversary of the Sunday Schools (1868)
  - The Church Hymnal: a collection of hymns from the Prayer book hymnal (1869)
  - The Book of Common Praise: with music for the Book of Common Prayer (1869)
  - A Church hymnal: compiled from "Additional hymns," "Hymns ancient and modern," and "Hymns for church and home," as authorized by the House of Bishops (1870)
  - The Parish hymnal: for "The service of song in the House of the Lord" (1870)
  - The Sunday School Hymnal (1871)
  - Hymnal: according to the use of the Protestant Episcopal Church in the United States of America (1871)
  - The Hymnal: with tunes old and new (1872)
  - Hymnal: according to the use of the Protestant Episcopal Church in the United States of America (1874)
  - The Church Porch: a service book and hymnal for Sunday schools (1874)
  - A New Hymnal for Sunday Schools (1875)
  - The Children's Hymnal with Tunes (1877)
  - The Sunday School Hymnal: a collection of hymns and music for use in Sunday school services and social meetings (1880)
  - Hymnal and Canticles of the Protestant Episcopal Church with Music (1883)
  - The Sunday-School Hymnal and Service Book (1887)
  - Hymns and Carols Set to Music (1889)
  - Hymn tunes: being further contributions to the hymnody of the church (1891)
  - The Church Hymnal with Canticles (1892)
  - The Hymnal: revised and enlarged as adopted by the General Convention of the Protestant Episcopal Church in the United States of America in the year of our Lord 1892 (1892)
  - The Church Hymnal, Revised and Enlarged (U.S.), 1892
  - The hymnal: revised and enlarged (1893)
  - The Hymnal: revised and enlarged with music, as used in Trinity Church (1893)
  - Church porch: a service book and hymnal for Sunday schools (1893)
  - A Hymnal and Service Book for Sunday Schools, Day Schools, Guilds, Brotherhoods (1893)
  - The Hymnal: revised and enlarged (1894)
  - The Church Hymnal: revised and enlarged (1894)
  - The Hymnal, Revised and Enlarged (1894)
  - The Church Hymnal (1898)
  - The Church Porch, a service book and hymnal for Sunday schools Rev. Ed. (1899)
  - The Order for Evensong: with hymns (1902)
  - The Church School Hymnal with Tunes (1903)
  - Hymn tunes: being further contributions to the hymnody of the church (1903)
  - Anthem book of the Church of St. Luke and The Epiphany (1909)
  - The Hymnal (1916)
  - Hymnal of the Society of the Companions of the Holy Cross (1918)
  - The Church Hymnal (1920)
  - The Hymnal (1920)
  - The Hymnal of the Protestant Episcopal Church in the United States of America (1940)
  - The Wayside Hymnal (1940)
  - Chapel Service, Cadet Hymns and Songs (1949)
  - The Church School Hymnal (1955)
  - Sing for Joy (1961)
  - The Saint Dunstan Hymnal (1968)
  - The Hymnal 1982
  - Lift Every Voice and Sing I & II (1993)
  - Wonder, Love, and Praise: a supplement to the Hymnal 1982 (1997)
  - Psalms for a Pilgrim People (1998)
  - Songs for the Cycle (2000)
  - Voices Found (2003)
  - My Heart Sings Out (2004)
  - The Crowning Glory (2005)
  - Great Paschal Vespers (2009)
  - Praises Abound: Hymns and Meditations for Lent and Easter (2012)
- Church of England
  The Church of England has no official hymnals. But various hymnals have been produced with Church of England usage in mind.
  - The Book of Common Prayer Noted (1550) by John Merbecke
  - Metrical psalters
  - Lyra Davidica (1708)
  - Collection of Psalms and Hymns (1737)
  - Compleat Psalmodist (1749) by John Arnold (1720–1792)
  - Harmonia Sacra (1754)
  - A Collection of hymns for social worship (1754)
  - Psalms and Hymns hymnal (1769)
  - Lock Hospital Collection (1769)
  - Psalms and Hymns hymnal (1769)
  - Olney Hymns (1779)
  - A Collection of Hymns for the Use of The People Called Methodists (1779)
  - The Christian Year: Thoughts in Verse (1827)
  - The Hymns of the Primitive Church (1837) by John Chandler
  - Old church Psalmody (1849)
  - Lyra Catholica: Containing All the Hymns of the Roman Breviary and Missal (1850)
  - Hymnal Noted (1851) by John Mason Neale
  - Mediæval Hymns and Sequences (1851)
  - Hymns and Introits (1852)
  - Hymns from the land of Luther (1853) by Jane Laurie Borthwick
  - Church Hymnal (1853) by William Cooke and William Denton
  - Hymns used at the Church of S. Leonard, Sunningwell, and the chapel of S. Swithun, Kennington, Diocese of Oxford (1855)
  - Lyra Germanica: Hymns for the Sundays and Chief Festivals of the Christian Year (1855) by Catherine Winkworth
  - A Hymnal for use in the English Church (1855)
  - Hymns collected for the use of Saint Leonard's Church Flamstead (1856)
  - Portions of the Psalms of David, with hymns on various subjects, selected and arranged for the use of the Congregation of the Parish Church of Bromley St. Leonard (1857)
  - Hymns Ancient and Modern (numerous editions, 1861–2013)
  - Church and home metrical psalter and hymnal (1862)
  - The Chorale Book for England (1863)
  - The Anglican hymn book (1868)
  - The Church Hymnal (1868)
  - The Sarum Hymnal (1869)
  - Hymns of the Eastern Church (1870)
  - Songs of Grace and Glory (1871) – an ultra-Calvinist book edited by Reverend Charles Busbridge Snepp (1823–1880), Vicar of Perry Barr in Birmingham, England
  - Sacred Songs and Solos (1873)
  - Church Hymns with Tunes (1874)
  - The new mitre-hymnal (1875)
  - The Song of praise (1875)
  - A Church of England Hymn Book by Godfrey Thring (1880)
  - Church Songs (1884)
  - The Altar hymnal (1885)
  - The Hymnal companion to the Book of common prayer (1890)
  - The Church of England Hymnal by Charles D. Bell and H. E. Fox (1894)
  - Yattendon Hymnal (1899)
  - The Cowley Carol Book (1901)
  - Church Hymns: with tunes (1903)
  - Additional Hymns with Tunes for use with any other church Hymnal (1903)
  - The English Hymnal (1906, 1933) – edited by Percy Dearmer, used in Anglo-Catholic churches
  - Church Hymnal for the Christian Year (1917) – an evangelical collection, replaced by the Anglican Hymn Book in 1965
  - Songs of Praise (1925)
  - The Oxford Book of Carols (1928)
  - Mirfield Mission Hymn Book (1955)
  - Carols for Choirs (1961)
  - Anglican Hymn Book (1965)
  - The Oxford Book of Tudor Anthems (1978)
  - Hymns for Today's Church (1982) – evangelical, notable for exclusive use of contemporary English
  - Mission Praise (1984)
  - The New English Hymnal (1986)
  - Church Family Worship: Jubilate Hymns (1988)
  - The New Oxford Book of Carols (1992)
  - The Shorter New Oxford Book of Carols (1993)
  - Hymns Old & New, New Anglican Edition (1996)
  - Sing Glory: Hymns, Psalms, and Songs for a New Century (1999)
  - Complete Anglican Hymns Old & New (2000)
  - Common Praise (2000) – an edition of Hymns Ancient and Modern
  - New English Praise (2006)
  - The Revised English Hymnal (2021)
- Church of Ireland
  - A Church Hymn Book: for the use of congregations of the United Church of England and Ireland (1861)
  - Church Hymnal 5th Edition (2000)
  - Companion to Church Hymnal 5th Edition (2003)
  - Thanks & Praise (2015)
  - Sing to the Word (2015)
- The Episcopal Church in the Philippines
  - The EPC Trial Hymnal
- The Church of the Province of South East Asia
  - The Amoy Hymnal
- The Anglican Church in Aotearoa, New Zealand and Polynesia
  - Has no official hymnals. But various books produced by the New Zealand Hymnbook Trust are suitable NZ Anglican usage.
- Reformed Episcopal Church (U.S.A.)
  - Hymns Recommended for use in the Reformed Episcopal Church (1874)
  - Hymnal of the Reformed Episcopal Church, adopted in General Council, Chicago, May 1879
  - Hymnal of the Reformed Episcopal Church (1884)
  - Hymnal Companion to the Prayer Book (1886)
  - Hymnal with music for children (1888)
  - Hymnal Companion to the Prayer Book: with accompanying tunes (1907)
  - Book of Common Praise (1915)
  - The Book of Common Praise (1940)
  - The Book of Common Praise: Hymnal Companion to the Book of Common Prayer (1943 and 2017 editions)
  - The Book of Common Praise (2017)

=== Reformed ===
- Canadian Reformed Church
  - Book of Praise (1961)
  - Book of Praise Supplement (1967)
  - Book of Praise (1972)
  - Book of Praise Hymn Section (1979)
  - Book of Praise (1984)
  - Book of Praise (2014)
- Christian Reformed Church in North America
  - The Psalter: with responsive readings (1912)
  - Psalter Hymnal (1929) – Red
  - Psalter Hymnal (1959) – Blue
  - Let Youth Praise Him (1962)
  - Psalter Hymnal (1987) – Grey
  - Songs for Life (1995)
  - Sing! A New Creation (2002)
  - Sing With Me (2006)
  - Singing the New Testament (2008)
  - Global Songs for Worship (2010)
  - Psalms for All Seasons: a complete Psalter for worship (2012)
  - Reformed Worship Collection (2012)
  - Lift Up Your Hearts (2013)
- Reformed Church in America
  - The Psalms of David: with the Ten Commandments, Creed, Lord's Prayer, &c. in metre (1767)
  - The Psalms of David: with hymns and spiritual songs: also, the catechism, confession of faith, and liturgy of the Reformed Church in the Netherlands (1789)
  - The Psalms and Hymns: with the catechism, confession of faith and liturgy of the Reformed Dutch Church in North America (1814)
  - Additional Hymns, Adopted by the General Synod of the Reformed Dutch Church in North America (1831)
  - The Psalms and Hymns, with the Catechism, Confession of Faith, and Liturgy, of the Reformed Dutch Church in North America (1839)
  - Sabbath School and Social Hymns of the Reformed Protestant Dutch Church of the U.S.A. (1843)
  - Additional Hymns, Adopted by the General Synod of the Reformed Protestant Dutch Church in North America, at their Session, June 1846 (1847)
  - Young Singer's Friend: or, the Lee Avenue collection of hymns and songs (1859)
  - The Psalms and Hymns, with the Doctrinal Standards and Liturgy of the Reformed Protestant Dutch Church in North America (1860)
  - Fulton Street Hymn Book (1862)
  - Hymns for the use of the Sabbath School of the Second Reformed Church (1868)
  - Hymns of the church (1869)
  - Hymns of Worship and Service (1910)
  - The Psalter: with responsive readings (1912)
  - The Hymnal of the Reformed Church (1920)
  - The Hymnbook (1955)
  - Liturgy and Psalms (1968)
  - Rejoice in the Lord (1985)
  - Lift Up Your Hearts (2013)
- Reformed Church in the United States (RCUS)
  - Psalms and Hymns, for the Use of the German Reformed Church, in the United States of America (1834)
  - Hymns for the Reformed Church in the United States (1874)
  - The Hymnal of the Reformed Church in the United States (1890)
  - Faith and Hope Hymnss (1912)
  - Wartburg Hymnal: for church, school and home (1918)
- United Reformed Church (UK)
  - Rejoice and Sing (1999)
- United Reformed Churches in North America
  - Trinity Psalter Hymnal (2018)

=== Christian Church (Disciples of Christ) ===
- Chalice Praise (2002)
- Cáliz de Bendiciones: Himnario Discipulos de Cristo (1996)
- Chalice Hymnal (1995)
- Hymnbook for Christian Worship (1970, jointly with American Baptist Convention)
- Hymns and Songs of the Spirit (1966, jointly with American Baptist Convention)
- Christian Worship (1941, jointly with Northern Baptist Convention)

=== Hussite ===
- Czech hymnal Jistebnice hymn book (1430)

=== Lutheran ===
Note: Not all congregations use a hymnal from their own denomination. For example, there are churches in the Evangelical Lutheran Synod that use LCMS hymnals (from before the Synodical Conference was dissolved) as well as WELS hymnals.

- American Lutheran Church (1930)
  - American Lutheran Hymnal (1930)
- Association of Free Lutheran Congregations
  - The Ambassador Hymnal (1994)
- Augustana Lutheran Episcopal Church
  - A Collection of Hymns and a Liturgy: for the use of Evangelical Lutheran Churches, to which are added prayers for families and individuals (1834)
  - Church Hymn Book; consisting of hymns and psalms, original and selected. adapted to public worship and many other occasions (1838)
- Church of the Lutheran Confession
  - The Lutheran Hymnal (1941)
  - Worship Supplement 2000 (2000)
- Danish Evangelical Lutheran Church of America
  - The Annex: Evangelical Hymns Translated and Original (1920)
  - Hymnal for Church and Home (1927)
  - A World of Song (1958)
- Evangelical Lutheran Church in America
  - Hymnal Supplement 1991, GIA Publications (1991)
  - With One Voice (supplement to the Lutheran Book of Worship) (1995)
  - This Far By Faith: an African American resource for worship (1999)
  - Evangelical Lutheran Worship, Augsburg Publishing House (2006)
- Evangelical Lutheran Joint Synod of Ohio
  - A Collection of Hymns and Prayers, for Public and Private Worship (1845)
  - Evangelical Lutheran hymnal (1880)
  - Evangelical Lutheran Hymnal (1891)
  - Evangelical Lutheran Hymnal. 9th ed. (1895)
  - Evangelical Lutheran Hymnal (1896)
  - Evangelical Lutheran hymnal: with music (1908)
  - Sacred Songs: for use in inner mission work and church societies (1914)
- Evangelical Lutheran Synod
  - The Lutheran Hymnal (1941)
  - Evangelical Lutheran Hymnary (1996)
- General Council of the Evangelical Lutheran Church in North America
  - The Book of Worship (1867)
  - Church Book: for the use of Evangelical Lutheran congregations (1868)
  - Hymns proposed to be appended to the Church book (1870)
  - Church Book: for the use of Evangelical Lutheran congregations (1890)
  - Sunday-School Book: with music: for the use of the Evangelical Lutheran congregations (1896)
  - Common Service Book of the Lutheran Church (1917)
- Hauge Synod
  - The Lutheran Hymnary (1913)
- Lutheran Church in America / Evangelical Lutheran Church in Canada
  - Service Book and Hymnal of the Lutheran Church in America (1958)
  - Songs and Hymns for Primary Children (1963)
  - Church School Hymnal for Children, Grades 3 to 6 (1964)
  - Young Children Sing, Church School Hymnal for Ages 3–7 (1967)
  - Lutheran Book of Worship, Augsburg Publishing House (1978)
- Lutheran Church of Australia
  - All Together series of spiritual song books
  - Lutheran Hymnal with Supplement (1987)
  - Together in Song: Australian Hymn Book II (1999)
- Lutheran Church–Missouri Synod / Lutheran Church–Canada
  - Hymns of the Evangelical Lutheran Church : for the use of English Lutheran missions (1886)
  - Evangelical Lutheran Hymn-Book, Lutheran Publication Board (1893) American Lutheran Publication Board (1909) abridged edition (1905) Concordia Publishing House (revised 1912 and 1918)
  - Sunday-School Hymnal, American Lutheran Publication Board (March 9, 1901)
  - Hymnal for Evangelical Lutheran missions (1905)
  - Hymnal and Prayer Book: compiled by the Lutheran Church Board for Army and Navy (1918)
  - Select Songs for School and Home (1922)
  - Lutheran Sunday School Hymnal (1925)
  - Primary and Junior Hymnal (1928)
  - The Lutheran Hymnal, Concordia Publishing House (1941)
  - Our Songs of Praise (1953)
  - Worship Supplement, Concordia Publishing House (1969) School and Home Edition (1971)
  - Joyful Sounds, The New Children's Hymnal, Concordia Publishing House (1977)
  - Lutheran Worship, Concordia Publishing House (1982)
  - All God's People Sing! Concordia Publishing House (1992)
  - Hymnal Supplement 98, Concordia Publishing House (1998)
  - This Far By Faith: an African American resource for worship (1999)
  - Lutheran Service Book, Concordia Publishing House (2006)
- Lutheran Congregations in Mission for Christ
  - ReClaim Hymnal, Sola Publishing (2006)
- North American Lutheran Church
  - ReClaim Hymnal, Sola Publishing (2006)
- Protes'tant Conference
  - A New Song, John Springer
- Synod of the Norwegian Evangelical Lutheran Church in America
  - Hymn book for the use of Evangelical Lutheran schools and congregations (1884)
  - Christian Hymns: for church, school and home: with music (1898)
  - The Church and Sunday-School Hymnal (1898)
  - The Lutheran Hymnary (1913)
  - The Lutheran Hymnary Junior (1916)
  - Concordia: a collection of hymns and spiritual songs (1918)
  - Young People's Luther League Convention Song Book
  - The Parish School Hymnal (1926)
  - The Primary Hymn Book, Hymns and Songs for Little Children (1936)
- United Lutheran Church in America
  - Common Service Book of the Lutheran Church with Hymnal (1917)
  - Hymnal for the Sunday School (1922)
  - Hymns and Prayers for Church Societies and Assemblies (1923)
- United Norwegian Lutheran Church of America
  - The Church and Sunday-School Hymnal (1898)
  - The Lutheran Hymnary (1913)
- Wisconsin Evangelical Lutheran Synod
  - Church Hymnal for Lutheran Services, Northwestern Publishing House (1911)
  - Book of Hymns for the joint Evangelical Lutheran Synod of Wisconsin, Minnesota, Michigan and other states, Northwestern Publishing House (1913)
  - Book of Hymns for the Evangelical Lutheran Joint Synod of Wisconsin and Other States, Northwestern Publishing House (1920)
  - Hymnal and Prayer Book: compiled by the Lutheran Church Board for Army and Navy, Concordia Publishing House (1918)
  - The Lutheran Hymnal, Concordia Publishing House (1941)
  - Sampler: New Hymns and Liturgy, Northwestern Publishing House (1986)
  - Christian Worship: A Lutheran Hymnal, Northwestern Publishing House (1993)
  - Christian Worship: Supplement, Northwestern Publishing House (2008)
  - Christian Worship: Hymnal, Northwestern Publishing House (2021)

=== Methodist ===
- African Methodist Episcopal Church
  - The African Methodist Episcopal Church Hymn Book (1837)
  - The Hymn Book of the African Methodist Episcopal Church: being a collection of hymns, sacred songs and chants (5th ed.) (1877)
  - New hymn and tune book (1889)
  - African Methodist Episcopal hymn and tune book: adapted to the doctrine and usages of the church. (1898)
  - Hymnal: adapted to the doctrines and usages of the African Methodist Episcopal Church. Revised Edition (1899)
  - The African Methodist Episcopal Hymn and Tune Book: adapted to the doctrines and usages of the church (6th ed.) (1902)
  - Songs of the Pilgrim Way (1915)
  - A.M.E. Hymnal: with responsive scripture readings (1946)
  - A.M.E.C. Hymnal (1954)
  - African Methodist Episcopal Church Hymnal (2011)
- Church of the United Brethren in Christ
  - The Christian Songster: a collection of hymns and spiritual songs, usually sung at camp, prayer, and social meetings, and revivals of religion. Designed for all denominations (1858)
  - A Collection of Hymns, for the use of the United Brethren in Christ: taken from the most approved authors, and adapted to public and private worship (1858)
  - Hymns for the Sanctuary and Social Worship: with tunes (1874)
  - Golden Songs: for the Sabbath School, Sanctuary and Social Worship (1874)
  - The Praise Offering: Designed Expressly for Prayer, Experience, Revival and Camp Meetings. (1876)
  - Songs of the Cross, for the Sabbath-school (1876)
  - Golden Leaves: a collection of choice hymns and tunes adapted to Sabbath-schools, social meetings, Bible classes, &c. (1880)
  - Gates of Praise: for the Sabbath-school, praise-service, prayer-meeting, etc. (1884)
  - Notes of Triumph: for the Sunday School (1886)
  - The People's Hymnal: for use in public and social worship (1890)
  - Songs of Refreshing: adapted for use in revival meetings, camp meetings, and the social services of the church. (1891)
  - The Sanctuary Hymnal, published by Order of the General Conference of the United Brethren in Christ (1914)
  - The Church Hymnal: the official hymnal of the Church of the United Brethren in Christ (1935)
- Evangelical Association
  - Hymns selected from various authors: for the use of the Evangelical Association, and all lovers of pious devotion (1850)
  - Sunday School Songs: a Treasury of Devotional Hymns and Tunes for the Sunday School (1880)
  - Hymn-Book of the Evangelical Association (1882)
  - The Evangelical Hymnal (1921)
- Evangelical United Brethren Church
  - The Hymnal of The Evangelical United Brethren Church (1957)
- Methodist Church of Great Britain
  - The Methodist Hymn-Book with Tunes (1933)
  - Hymns and Psalms (1983)
  - Singing the Faith (2011)
- Methodist Church in the Caribbean and the Americas
  - The Methodist Hymn-Book with Tunes (1933)
  - Voices In Praise (2013)
- Methodist Church (USA)
  - The Methodist Hymnal: official hymnal of the Methodist Church (1939)
  - The Book of Hymns (1966)
- Moravian Church
  - Hymns Arranged for the Communion Service of the Church of the United Brethren (1802)
  - A Collection of Hymns for the Use of the Protestant Church of the United Brethren. Rev. ed. (1813)
  - A Collection of Hymns for the Use of the Protestant Church of the United Brethren. (New and Rev. ed.) (1819)
  - A Collection of Hymns, for the Use of the Protestant Church of the United Brethren. New and Revised ed. (1832)
  - Sacred Poems and Hymns (1854)
  - Hymns and Offices of Worship: for use in schools: with an appendix of tunes (1866)
  - The Liturgy and Hymns of the American Province of the Unitas Fratrum (1876)
  - Offices of Worship and Hymns: principally for use in schools. with an appendix of tunes (1883)
  - Offices of Worship and Hymns: with tunes, 3rd ed., revised and enlarged (1891)
  - The Liturgy and the Offices of Worship and Hymns of the American Province of the Unitas Fratrum, or the Moravian Church (1908)
  - Hymnal and Liturgies of the Moravian Church (1920)
  - Hymnal and Liturgies of the Moravian Church (1969)
  - Moravian Book of Worship (1995)
- United Methodist Church
  - Songs of Zion (1981)
  - The United Methodist Hymnal (1989)
  - The United Methodist Hymnal Music Supplement (1991)
  - Voices: Native American hymns and worship resources (1992)
  - The United Methodist Hymnal Music Supplement II (1993)
  - Songs for the World: Hymns by Charles Wesley (2001)
  - The Faith We Sing (supplement to The United Methodist Hymnal, 2001)
  - Rock of Ages A Worship and Songbook for Retirement Living (2002)
  - Peace be with You: collection of hymns for the Russian United Methodist Church (2002)
  - Zion still Sings (2007)
  - Upper Room Worshipbook Music and Liturgies for Spiritual Formation (2008)
  - Worship and Song (2011)
- Methodist Episcopal Church, South
  - Wesleyan Hymn and Tune Book: Comprising the Entire Collection of Hymns in the Hymn Book of the Methodist Episcopal Church, South (1859)
  - Hymns for Schools and Families, Specially Designed for the Children of the Church (1859)
  - A Collection of Hymns for Public, Social, and Domestic Worship (1875)
  - New Life: or, Songs and Tunes for Sunday-Schools, Prayer Meetings, and Private Occasions (1879)
  - The New Hymn Book: a Collection of Hymns for Public, Social, and Domestic Worship (1881)
  - Grace and Glory: a choice collection of sacred songs, original and selected, for Sabbath-schools, revivals, etc. (1882)
  - Prayer and Praise: or Hymns and Tunes for Prayer Meetings, Praise Meetings, Experience Meetings, Revivals, Missionary Meetings and all special occasions of Christian work and worship (1883)
  - New Life No. 2: songs and tunes for Sunday schools, prayer meetings, and revival occasions (1886)
  - Hymn Book of the Methodist Episcopal Church, South (1889)
  - The Young People's Hymnal, adapted to the use of Sunday schools, Epworth leagues, prayer meetings, and revivals (1897)
  - Hymn and Tune Book of the Methodist Episcopal Church, South (Round Note Ed.) (1902)
  - The Methodist Hymnal (1905)
  - The Young People's Hymnal No. 3: adapted to the use of Sunday Schools, Epworth Leagues, prayer meetings and revivalss (1906)
  - Revival Praises (1907)
  - Songs for the Sunday School (1921)
  - The Cokesbury Hymnal (1923)
  - The Cokesbury Worship Hymnal (unofficial, 1938)
- Methodist Episcopal Church (U.S.A.)
  - A Pocket hymn book, designed as a constant companion for the pious: collected from various authors (1788)
  - The Methodist pocket hymn-book (1803)
  - The Camp Meeting Hymn Book (1831)
  - A New Selection of Hymns and Spiritual Songs (1832)
  - A Collection of Hymns for the Use of the Methodist Episcopal Church (1832)
  - The Methodist Harmonist, containing a collection of tunes from the best authors (1833)
  - Selection of Hymns for the Sunday School Union of the Methodist Episcopal Church (1836)
  - Hymns Composed for the Use of Sunday Schools, and Youthful Christians (1837)
  - The Sweet Singer of Israel (1840)
  - Select Melodies, Comprising the Best of Those Hymns and Spiritual Songs in Common Use not Found in the Standard Methodist Episcopal Hymnal (1843)
  - A Collection of Hymns for the use of the Methodist Episcopal Church (1844)
  - A Collection of Hymns: for the use of the Methodist Episcopal Church (1845)
  - The Wesleyan Minstrel: a Collection of Hymns and Tunes (1850)
  - Hymns for Sunday Schools, Youth, and Children (1852)
  - The Zion Songster: a Collection of Hymns and Spiritual Songs (1854)
  - Hymns for Sunday Schools, Youth and Children (1854)
  - The Wesleyan Sacred Harp: a collection of choice tunes and hymns for prayer class and camp meetings (1855)
  - Hymns for Sunday Schools, Youth, and Children (1857)
  - Familiar Hymns for Social Meetings (1864)
  - The Heart and Voice: or, Songs of Praise for the Sanctuary (1865)
  - New Hymn and Tune book: an Offering of Praise for the Methodist Episcopal Church (1866)
  - The Centenary Singer: a collection of hymns and tunes popular during the last one hundred years (1867)
  - The New Song (1875)
  - Gems of Praise (Choice Collection of Sacred Melodies) (1876)
  - Hymnal of the Methodist Episcopal Church, with Tunes [harmonized] (1878)
  - The Epworth Hymnal: containing standard hymns of the Church (1885)
  - The Emory Hymnal: a collection of sacred hymns and music for use in public worship (1887)
  - Selection of Hymns, for the use of the first M. E. Church, Cape May City
  - The Emory Hymnal: No. 2, sacred hymns and music for use in public worship (1891)
  - Hymnal of the Methodist Episcopal Church (1891)
  - Hymn studies; an illustrated and annotated edition of the Hymnal of the Methodist Episcopal Church (1891)
  - Ocean Grove Songs (1900)
  - Hymnal of the First General Missionary Convention of the Methodist Episcopal Church (1901)
  - Ocean Grove Christian Songs: and responsive readings (Revised Edition) (1903)
  - The Methodist Hymnal (1905)
  - The Methodist Sunday School Hymnal (1911)
  - Songs of Conquest (1912)
  - The Methodist Hymnal (1935)
- Methodist Protestant Church
  - Hymn Book of the Methodist Protestant Church (1838)
  - The Voice of Praise: a collection of hymns for the use of the Methodist Church (1873)
- United Evangelical Church
  - Hymn Book of the United Evangelical Church (1897)
- United Methodist Church in the Philippines
  - Ilocano Hymns United (published by the National Council of Churches in the Philippines, 2002)
- Wesleyan Methodist Church in Canada
  - The Canadian Sunday School Harp (1866)
- Methodist Church, Canada
  - The Dominion Hymnal for Sunday-school and Social Worship (1883)
  - The Canadian Hymnal (1889)
  - New Canadian Hymnal (1916)
  - Methodist Hymn and Tune Book: official hymn book of the Methodist Church (1917)
- Methodist Church of Canada
  - Canadian Sabbath-School Hymn Book (1866)
  - A Collection of Hymns, for the Use of the People Called Methodists, with a Supplement (1874)
  - The Wave of Sunday School Song (1878)
  - Methodist Tune Book: a collection of tunes adapted to the Methodist Hymn book (1881)
  - Hymnal for Sunday School and Social Worship (1881)
  - Methodist Hymn-Book (1884)
  - Revival Hymns, Selected and Arranged (1889)
  - Songs of Calvary (1889)
  - The Canadian Hymnal (1892)
  - Methodist Hymn and Tune Book (1894)
  - The Canadian Hymnal (1895)
  - A Companion to the Canadian Sunday School Harp (1899)
  - The New Canadian Hymnal (1916)

=== Moravian Church ===
- First Hymn Book of the Unitas Fratrum (1501). In "the Bohemian tongue", compiled by Bishop Luke of Prague, printed in Prague. Other editions: 1505 and 1519.
- First Hymn Book of the Renewed Church (1735)
- First English Moravian Hymn Book (1741). Other editions: 1746, 1754, eleven others, 1849 edited by James Montgomery and 1912 (with a supplement in 1940).
- The Liturgy and the Offices of Worship and Hymns of the American Province of the Unitas Fratrum, or the Moravian Church (1908). "The synod of 1903 authorized the Executive Board of the Church to introduce the Liturgy [section one, 119 pp.] into the same book with the Offices of Worship and Hymns [section two, 435 pp., including an Appendix]." (p. v) The Liturgy and Hymns "are the result of a series of resolutions adopted by the Provincial Synods of 1864, 1867, 1868, 1870, and 1873." (p. iv) The Offices of Worship and Hymns are the Third Edition, Revised and Enlarged (1891). Also contains an Index to the First Lines of all the Stanzas (to p. 475), and an Alphabetical List of Tunes (to p. 479).
- The Moravian Hymn Book authorized for use in the British Province of the Moravian Church (1969). Contains: Acknowledgments, Contents, Preface, 710 numbered hymns including 140 of Moravian Church origin, the rest being from "...the whole Christian tradition of hymnody...", Index to first lines, Index of authors and translators. This Hymn Book is also used in the English speaking Caribbean. It includes a collection of Liturgies (revised 1960). A music edition was published in 1975. A version without the liturgy is also available
- Sing Out Today (1994) a collection of hymns by contemporary writers – words only. The music edition includes writers from the British Province only.
- Moravian Book of Worship (1995) the service book of the Moravian Church in North America.

=== New Apostolic Church ===
- New Apostolic Hymnal

=== Presbyterian ===
- Presbyterian Church in the United States of America
  - Psalms and hymns adapted to public worship. Philadelphia : Presbyterian Board of Publication, 1830.
  - The Presbyterian Hymnal. Philadelphia: Presbyterian Board of Publication, 1874.
  - The Hymnal Published by Authority of the General Assembly of the Presbyterian Church in the United States of America. Philadelphia: Presbyterian Board of Publication and Sabbath-School work, 1895.
  - The Hymnal Published in 1895 and Revised in 1911. Philadelphia: Presbyterian Board of Education and Sabbath-School Work.
- Presbyterian Church (U.S.A.)
  - Glory to God: The Presbyterian Hymnal (2013)
  - Sing the Faith (2003)
  - Presbyterian Hymnal: Hymns, Psalms, and Spiritual Songs. Louisville, KY: Westminster/John Knox Press, 1990.
- Presbyterian Church in the United States
  - The Presbyterian Hymnal (1927)
  - The Hymnbook (PCUS, ARPC, and UPCUSA) (1955)
  - The Worshipbook: Services and Hymns. Philadelphia: Westminster Press, 1972. (Jointly published by PCUS, CPC, and UPCUSA) (1972)
- Orthodox Presbyterian Church
  - Trinity Hymnal. Orthodox Presbyterian Church, Philadelphia, Penn., (1961)
  - Trinity Hymnal. (Rev. ed.) Great Commission Publications, 1990. (collaborating with the PCA)
  - Trinity Psalter Hymnal (2018)
- Reformed Presbyterian Church of North America
  - The Book of Psalms for Singing (1973)
  - The Book of Psalms for Worship (2009)
- Presbyterian Church of Australia
  - Revised Church Hymnary (1927)
  - Rejoice! (1987)
  - Revised Church Hymnary
- Church of Scotland
  - See Hymnbooks of the Church of Scotland
- The Presbyterian Church of Nigeria
  - Revised Church Hymnary (1927)
- Presbyterian Church in Canada
  - The Book of Praise (1918)
  - The Book of Praise (1972)
  - The Book of Praise (1997)
- Presbyterian Church in Ireland
  - The Irish Presbyterian Hymn Book (2004)

=== United Church of Canada ===
- The Hymnary (1925)
- Songs for Little Children (1937)
- The Canadian Youth Hymnal: with music [harmonized] (1939)
- Songs of the Gospel (a supplemental collection of evangelistic hymns and songs, 1948)
- Bless the Lord (1967)
- The Hymn Book (1971), produced jointly with Anglican Church of Canada
- Sing (1972)
- Songs for a Gospel People (Supplement to THB, 1987)
- Voices United (1996)
- More Voices (Supplement to VU, 2007)
- Worship in the city: prayers and songs for urban settings (2015)

=== Uniting Church in Australia ===
- Australian Hymn Book (1977)
- Together in Song: Australian Hymn Book II (1999)

=== Eastern ===
- Hymns of the Eastern Church
- Hymns of the Greek Church
- Hymns of the Holy Eastern Church: translated from the service books with introductory chapters on the history, doctrine, and worship of the church
- Hymns and Poetry of the Eastern Church
- Hymns from the Morningland (1911)

== Denominational hymnals ==
=== Anabaptist ===
See also Mennonite.

- Ausbund (1564)
- The Christian Hymnary (1972)
- Zion’s Praises (1987) ISBN 978-0-8781-3110-5
- Zion's Harp (Harpa de Sion)

=== Assemblies of God ===
- Songs of Pentecostal Fellowship (1924)
- Spiritual Songs (1930)
- Songs of Praise (1935)
- Glorious Gospel Hymns (1946)
- Assembly Songs (1948)
- Redemption Hymnal (from the Assemblies of God in Great Britain) (1951)
- Melodies of Praise (1957)
- Hymns of Glorious Praise (1969)
- Sing His Praise (1991)

=== Baptist ===
- American Baptist Association
  - American Baptist Hymnal
  - In Spirit and In Truth
- American Baptist Churches (formerly American Baptist Convention, previously Northern Baptist Convention)
  - The New Baptist Praise Book: or, Hymns of the Centuries (1914)
  - The Heart's Offering with Songs New and Old for The Lord's Memorial (1915)
  - Revival Gems: a Small Book with a Big Mission (1921)
  - Living Hymns: the small hymnal: a book of worship and praise for the developing life (1923)
  - The New Baptist Hymnal (1926)
  - Junior Hymns and Songs: for use in Church School (1927)
  - Christian Worship (1941, jointly with Disciples of Christ)
  - Hymns and Songs of the Spirit (1966, jointly with Disciples of Christ)
  - Hymnbook for Christian Worship (1970, jointly with Disciples of Christ)
  - The Baptist Hymnal: for use in the church and home (2012)
- Association of Reformed Baptist Churches of America
  - Trinity Hymnal (Baptist Edition)
- Baptist General Conference
  - Gospel Hymnal (1950)
  - Worship and Service Hymnal with Favorite Swedish-Translation Hymns appended (1964, available only from Harvest Publications)
- Cooperative Baptist Fellowship
  - Celebrating Grace (2010)
- Independent Fundamental Baptist
  - All-American Church Hymnal (1957)
  - Soul-Stirring Songs & Hymns (1972)
  - Hymns of Faith (1980)
  - Bible Truth Hymns (2008)
  - Majesty Hymns (1998)
- National Baptist Convention
  - National Tidings of Joy (1878)
  - Celestial Showers (1895)
  - The National Baptist Hymn Book (1906)
  - Gospel Pearls (1921)
  - The Baptist Standard Hymnal: with responsive readings: a new book for all services (1924)
  - The New National Baptist Hymnal (1977)
  - The New National Baptist Hymnal (21st Century Edition) (2001)
- North American Baptist Conference
  - North American Hymnal
- Primitive Baptist
  - Old School Sonnets, or a Selection of Choice Hymns (1836)
  - North Carolina sonnets, or A selection of choice hymns for the use of Old School Baptists (1844)
  - The Primitive Hymns, Spiritual Songs and Sacred Poems Regularly Selected, Classified and Set in Order (1858)
  - The Baptist Hymn Book: comprising a large and choice collection of psalms, hymns and spiritual songs (1859)
  - The Primitive Baptist Hymnal: a choice collection of hymns and tunes of early and late composition (1881)
  - Hymn and Tune Book for Use in Old School or Primitive Baptist Churches (1886)
  - Harp of Ages
  - Old Baptist Hymns (2012)
  - Old School Hymnal
  - Primitive Baptist Hymn Book
  - The Good Old Songs
  - Songs of Faith (Double Oak Press) (2000)
  - The Primitive Baptist Hymnal (2004)
- Southern Baptist Convention
  - Baptist Hymn Book (1847)
  - The Baptist Psalmody: a selection of hymns for the worship of God (1850)
  - Dyer's Psalmist: A Collection of Hymns and Sacred Songs for the use of Baptist Churches (1851)
  - Kind Words: a new collection of hymns and tunes for sunday schools and the social circle (1871)
  - The New Baptist Psalmist and Tune Book: for churches and Sunday-schools (1873)
  - The Little Seraph: in seven character notes, for churches and Sunday-schools (1874)
  - The Baptist Hymn and Praise Book (1904)
  - The Broadman Hymnal (1940)
  - Look and Live Songs (1945)
  - Voice of Praise (1947)
  - Crusade Songs (1954)
  - Baptist Hymnal (1956)
  - Junior Hymnal (1964)
  - Baptist Hymnal (1975)
  - Baptist Hymnal (1991)
  - Songs of Faith (Double Oak Press) (2000)
  - Baptist Hymnal (2008)
- Strict Baptist
  - A Selection of Hymns for Public Worship (1814)

=== British Pentecostal Fellowship ===
- Redemption Hymnal (1951)

=== Chartist ===
- National Chartist Hymn Book (1845)

=== Christadelphian ===
- Praise The Lord (Hoddesdon Christadelphian Services, 2000)
- Christadelphian Hymn Book (Christadelphian Magazine and Publishing Association, 2003)
- Worship (Christadelphian Art Trust, 2008)

=== Christian Congregation in the United States ===
- Hymns of Praise and Supplication to God (5th Edition - 2012)

=== Church of Christ (Holiness) U.S.A. ===
- His Fullness Songs (1977)

=== Christian Science ===
- The Christian Science Hymnal (1932)
- Christian Science Hymnal Supplement (2008)
- Christian Science Hymnal: Hymns 430–602 (2017)

=== Church of God (Anderson, Indiana) ===
- Select Hymns For Christian Worship and General Gospel Service (1911)
- (1918)
- (1923)
- (1926)
- (1938)
  - Select Hymns For Christian Worship and General Gospel Service Number 2 (1950)
- Worship the Lord – Hymnal of the Church of God (1989)

=== Church of God (Cleveland, Tennessee) ===
- Church Hymnal (1951)
- Hymns Of The Spirit (1969)

=== Church of God in Christ ===
- Yes, Lord! (1982)

=== Church of God (Seventh Day) ===
- Songs of Truth (1916)
- Hymns of Truth (No. 1) (1940)
- Hymns of Truth (No. 2) (1955)
- Worship in Song (1967)

=== Church of the Brethren ===
- The Brethren's Tune and Hymn Book (1872)
- Sunday School Song Book (1893)
- Missionary Hymn Book (1893)
- The Brethren Hymnal (1901)
- Kingdom Songs (1911)
- Kingdom Songs no. 2 (1917 & 1918)
- Hymnal – Church of the Brethren (1925)
- The Brethren Hymnal (1951)
- Hymnal: A Worship Book (1992)

=== The Church of Jesus Christ of Latter-day Saints ===
- A Selection from the "Songs of Zion" (1918?). N.B.: Excerpted from that fuller hymnal.
- Hymns of the Church of Jesus Christ of Latter-Day Saints, Intellectual Reserve, Inc. (1985)
- Hymnes [de l']Église de Jésus-Christ des saints des derniers jours (1954, reprinted in 1971)
- Relief Society Songs (1940)

=== Church of the Nazarene ===
- Special Sacred Songs, Lillenas Publishing (1919)
- Special Sacred Songs No. 2: Sacred Solos, Duets, Quartets, Lillenas Publishing (1920)
- Special Sacred Songs No. 3: Sacred Solos, Duets, Quartets for Use By Singing Evangelists and All Other Gospel Singers, Lillenas Publishing (1927)
- Songs of Full Salvation, Lillenas Publishing
- New Songs of the Old Faith, Lillenas Publishing
- New Songs of the Old Faith No. 2, Lillenas Publishing (1927) 276 hymns
- Favorite Gospel Songs, Lillenas Publishing (c1927) 79 songs
- Great Gospel Songs, Lillenas Publishing (1929) 163 hymns
- Glorious Gospel Songs, Lillenas Publishing (1931) 1st official hymnal
- Lillenas' Solos and Duets Number 1, Lillenas Publishing (1931) 118 songs
- Lillenas' Songs for Men, Lillenas Publishing (1931) 126 songs
- The Lillenas' Ladies Voices, Lillenas Publishing
- Songs of Victorious Faith, Lillenas Publishing (c1935) 203 songs
- New Sacred Solos and Duets, Lillenas Publishing (1939)
- Hymns of Conquest, Lillenas Publishing (1940)
- Sacred Trios For Women, Lillenas Publishing (1941)
- Inspiring Gospel Solos & Duets Number 1, Lillenas Publishing
- Inspiring Gospel Solos & Duets Number 2, Lillenas Publishing (1948)
- Singing Joy: A Chorus Book for Young People, Lillenas Publishing (1950) 178 songs
- Glorious Freedom: Songs for Evangelism, Lillenas Publishing (1951) 129 songs
- Showers of Blessing No. 1, Lillenas Publishing,
- Showers of Blessing No. 2, Lillenas Publishing, 138 songs
- Praise and Worship, Lillenas Publishing (1952), also Nazarine Publishing House, pref. 1951; the 2nd official hymnal
- Rejoice and Sing! A Hymnal for All Services with Accent on Youth, Lillenas Publishing (1958)
- Joyfully Sing - A Hymnal For Juniors, Lillenas Publishing (1968)
- Songs of the Sanctuary, Lillenas Publishing (1970) 345 hymns
- Reasons to Sing: A Songbook for Youth Today, Lillenas Publishing (1971) 62 songs
- Worship in Song, Lillenas Publishing (1972) 3rd official hymnal
- Scriptures To Sing: New And Old (A Supplementary Hymnal, Designed For Use By Youth, Bible Study, And Prayers Fellowships), Lillenas Publishing (1977)
- Wesley Hymns, Lillenas Publishing (1982) 164 Hymns of John Wesley and Charles Wesley
- Exalt Him! Hymnal Supplemental, Lillenas Publishing (19--)
- Sing to the Lord, Lillenas Publishing (1993) 4th and current official hymnal

=== Churches of Christ ===
- Christian Hymnbook, Alexander Campbell (1865)
- The Christian Hymnal, American Christian Missionary Society (1882)
- New Christian Hymn and Tune, Fillmore Brothers (1882)
- Gloria in Excelsis, William E.M. Hackleman (1905)
- Hymni Ecclesiae, William E.M. Hackleman (1911)
- Great Songs of the Church (later, revised and supplemented by ACU Press), E.L. Jorgenson (1921)
- Choice Gospel Hymns, Charles Mitchell Pullias (1923)
- Christian Hymns, L.O. Sanderson (1935)
- Complete Christian Hymnal, Marion Davis & Foy E. Wallace Jr. (1940)
- Christian Hymns II, L.O. Sanderson (1948)
- Sacred Selections for the Church, Ellis J. Crum (1956)
- Majestic Hymnal II, Reuel Lemmons (1959)
- Abiding Hymns, Robert C. Welch (1963)
- Christian Hymnal, J. Nelson Slater (1963)
- Christian Hymns III, L.O. Sanderson (1966)
- Special Sacred Selections, Ellis J. Crum (1977)
- Songs of the Church (later, supplemented and revised by Taylor Publications), Alton Howard publishing (1971, 1973, 1978)
- Hymns of Praise, Reuel Lemmons (Firm Foundation, 1978)
  - Gospel Songs & Hymns, V.E. Howard, (1978)
- Church Gospel Songs and Hymns, V.E. Howard Publishing (1983)
- Hymns for Worship (Revised in 1994 with a couple hundred more selections), R.J. Stevens publishing (1987)
- Praise for the Lord, John P. Wiegand (1992)
- Songs of Faith and Praise, Alton Howard publishing (1993)
- Favourite Hymns of the Church, Eye-Opener Publications (1995)
- Sacred Songs of the Church, W. D. Jeffcoat, Psallo Publications (2007)
- Songs for Worship and Praise, R.J. Taylor Publications (2010)
- Psalms, Hymns, and Spiritual Songs, Sumphonia Productions, LLC (2012)

=== Churches of Christ in Australia ===
- Churches of Christ Hymn Book
- Together in Song: Australian Hymn Book II (1999)

=== Community of Christ ===
- Community of Christ Sings (2013) ISBN 978-0-8309-1552-1 (pew) and ISBN 978-0-8309-1553-8 (musicians / Large print)
- Hymns of the Saints (1981) ISBN 0-8309-0326-7
- Sing A New Song (1999) ISBN 0-8309-0827-7
- Sing for Peace (1994) ISBN 0-8309-0665-7
- Hymns of the Restoration (Restoration Hymn Society), Enlarged ed. (1984), without ISBN
- By Request: Songs for the Community of Christ (2004) ISBN 0-8309-1108-1
- The Hymnal for Youth. Herald ed. (1955)
- Children's Hymnal (1957)
- The Hymnal (1956)
- The Saints' Hymnal (1933)
- Zion's Praises (1903)
- The Saints' Hymnal (1895)
- The Saints' Harmony (1889)
- The Saints' Harp (1870)
- The Latter Day Saints' Selection of Hymns (1861)

=== National Association of Congregational Christian Churches ===
- The Pilgrim Hymnal (1904)
- Hymns for a Pilgrim People, GIA Publications (2007)

=== Free Pentecostal/Independent Holiness ===
- Songs We Sing - Complete (1954)
- Holiness Hymns of Praise No. 1 (1981)
- Songs With a Message (1985)
- Holiness Hymns of Praise No. 2 (2004)

=== Friends (Quakers) ===
- Worship in Song (1995)

=== Gospel Assembly Churches ===
- Voices of Praise (1982)
- New Voices of Praise (1988)
- Glorious Praise

=== Holiness (Wesleyan) ===
- Songs of Amazing Grace

=== Iglesia ni Cristo ===
- Himnario ng Iglesia ni Cristo (Hymnal book of the Church of Christ) (1937)

=== Jehovah's Witnesses ===
- "Sing Out Joyfully" to Jehovah, Watch Tower Bible and Tract Society of Pennsylvania (2016)

=== Union for Reform Judaism ===
- "Union Hymnal" (ed. Cantor Alois Kaiser), Central Conference of American Rabbis (1897)
- "Union Hymnal for Jewish Worship" (ed. Rabbi Harry H. Mayer), Central Conference of American Rabbis (1914)
- "Union Hymnal: Songs and Prayers for Jewish Worship," Third Edition Revised and Enlarged (ed. Abraham Wolf Binder), Central Conference of American Rabbis (1932)
- "Union Hymnal: Songs and Prayers for Jewish Worship," Part II—Musical Services, Third Edition Revised and Enlarged (ed. Abraham Wolf Binder), Central Conference of American Rabbis (1932)
- "Union Songster: Songs and Prayers for Jewish Youth" (ed. Eric Werner), Central Conference of American Rabbis (1960)
- "Shirim u-Zemirot" (ed. Jack Gottlieb), Central Conference of American Rabbis and American Conference of Cantors (1977)
- "Gates of Song: Music for Shabbat" (ed. Charles Davidson), Transcontinental Music Publications (1987)

=== Mennonite ===
- A Selection of Psalms, Hymns and Spiritual Songs, from the Most Approved Authors (1847)
- A Collection of Hymns, Designed for the Use of the Church of Christ (1847)
- A Collection of Psalms, Hymns, and Spiritual Songs Suited to the Various Occasions of Public Worship (1851)
- A Collection of Psalms, Hymns, and Spiritual Songs: suited to the various occasions of public worship and private devotion of the church of Christ: with an appendix of German hymns (1869)
- A Collection of Psalms, Hymns, and Spiritual Songs: suited to the various occasions of public worship and private devotion, of the church of Christ (1872)
- A Collection of Hymns: designed for the use of the Church of Christ (1873)
- Philharmonia (1875) by Martin D. Wenger, reprinted and now updated by Old Order Mennonite Conference of Ontario.
- Bible School Hymns and Sacred Songs for Sunday Schools and Other Religious Services (1883)
- A Collection of Psalms and Hymns: suited to the various occasions of public worship and private devotion (1884)
- Hymns and tunes for public and private worship, and Sunday schools compiled by a committee (1890)
- Church and Sunday school hymnal, a collection of hymns and sacred songs, appropriate for church services, Sunday schools, and general devotional exercises. Compiled and published under the direction of a committee appointed by Mennonite conferences, Musical Editor – John David Brunk (1902)
- New Harmonia Sacra (1915) by Joseph Funk and sons
- Life Songs: a collection of sacred songs for Sunday schools, young people's meetings and evangelistic services (1916)
- Life Songs: a collection of sacred songs for Sunday schools, young people's meetings and evangelistic services by John David Brunk Samuel Frederick Coffman (1916)
- Children's hymns and songs by Joseph Kennel (1924)
- The Sheet Music of Heaven (Spiritual Song); The Mighty Triumphs of Sacred Song (1925) by Clayton F. Derstine
- Church hymnal, Mennonite, a collection of hymns and sacred songs, suitable for use in public worship, worship in the home, and all general occasions (1927)
- A Collection of Psalms and Hymns Suited to the Various Occasions of Public Worship (1928)
- Select hymns and gospel songs taken from the Church hymnal for use in conferences and special meetings (1929)
- Songs of cheer for children, a collection of hymns and songs suitable for use in the primary and junior departments of our Sunday schools, authorized by Mennonite General Conference, compiled by Music Committee (1929)
- Life Songs No. 2 (1938)
- Selections from Life songs No. 2 (1942)
- Junior hymns for juniors in church, Sunday school, and Summer Bible school (1947)
- Handbook to The Mennonite Hymnary, by Lester Hostetler (1949)
- Collection of Hymns Designed for the use of the Church of Christ by the Reformed Mennonite Church (1949)
- Songs of the Church by Walter Eli Yoder, Herald Press (1953)
- Mennonite Brethren Church Hymnal (1953)
- Singing Revival (1953)
- Selections from Church hymnal for use in conference, special meetings (1953)
- Christian Hymnal, a Collection of Hymns and Sacred Songs Suitable for Use in Public Worship (1959)
- The Mennonite Hymnal (1960)
- Christian Hymnal Selections: compiled for general use in evangelistic services (1962)
- The Mennonite Hymnal (1969)
- Christian Hymnary (1971)
- Sing and Rejoice! (1979)
- Hymns for Praise and Worship (1984)
- Hymnal: A Worship Book (1992)
- The Harmonia Sacra (1993)
- Worship Together (1995)
- Worship in Song: A Friends Hymnal (1996)
- Sing the Journey (2005)
- Sing the Story (2007)
- Hymns of the Church (2011)
- Praises We Sing (2015)
- Voices Together, published by MennoMedia (2020)

=== Old German Baptist Brethren ===
- Missionary Hymns (1890)
- The Christians Duty, exhibited, in a series of Hymns (1st Ed.)

=== Pentecostal Church of God ===
- Favorite Hymns (1966)
- Messenger Melodies (1987)

=== Pentecostal Holiness Church ===
- The Gospel Hymnal (1973)

=== Plymouth Brethren ===
- Open Brethren
  - Hymns of Worship and Remembrance
  - Choice Hymns of the Faith
  - Hymns of Truth and Praise
  - Believers Hymn Book
  - Redemption Songs
  - Gospel Hymn Book
- Exclusive Brethren
  - Little Flock hymnbook

=== Quaker ===
See Friends

=== Protestant Reformed Church ===
- The Psalter (1912; 1927)

=== The Salvation Army ===
- The Song Book of The Salvation Army – Contains the words only.
- The Tune Book of The Salvation Army – Two Editions for accompaniment either by means of Piano or Brass Band : Piano Version, and Brass Band (varying parts: Solo Cornet, Euphonium, etc.)

=== Seventh-day Adventist Church ===
- Hymns and Tunes for Those Who Keep the Commandments of God and the Faith of Jesus (1869)
- The Seventh-day Adventist Hymn and Tune Book (Hymns and Tunes) (1886)
- Christ in Song (1908)
- The Church Hymnal (1941)
- Seventh-day Adventist Hymnal (1985)

=== Seventh-Day Baptist Church ===
- 'Hymns in Commemoration of the Sufferings of Our Blessed Saviour Jesus Christ, compos'd for the celebration of his Holy Supper' (1697; 3rd ed., 1713)
- 'Hymns Compos'd for the Celebration of the Holy Ordinance of Baptism' (1712)

=== Shakers ===
- Millennial Praises – was the first Shaker hymn book published.

=== Spiritualists' National Union and National Spiritualist Association of Churches ===
- Spiritualist Hymnal: a Revised Collection of Words and Music [(harmonized)] for the Congregation. Second ed., 1st printing 1960, 2nd printing 1964.
- Spiritualists' Hymn Book. 24th impression reprinted 2008.

=== Unification Church ===
- Holy Songbook, The Holy Spirit Association for the Unification of World Christianity (2000)

=== Unitarian, Universalist, and Unitarian Universalist ===
- Gospel Liturgy: a prayer-book for churches, congregations, and families, Universalist Church in America (1861)
- Social Hymns and Tunes, American Unitarian Association (1869)
- Vestry Harmonies: a collection of hymns and tunes for all occasions of social worship, Universalist Church in America (1871)
- Services for Congregational Worship, American Unitarian Association (1898)
- Praise and Thanks A Hymn Book for the Young People's Christian Union of the Universalist Church, Unitarian Publishing House (1903)
- The Unitarian Faith Set Forth in Fifty Unitarian Hymns, American Unitarian Association (1914)
- Hymns of the Church, Universalist Church in America (1917)
- The Beacon Song and Service Book, American Unitarian Association (1935)
- Hymns of the Spirit, Universalist Church in America and the American Unitarian Association (1937)
- LRY Songbook, Greater Washington Area Federation of LRY for the 1962 Summer Conference of the Middle Atlantic Regional Council of Liberal Religious Youth in the Year MCLXII (1962)
- Hymns for the Celebration of Life, The Unitarian Universalist Association (1964)
- Liberal Religious Youth Ohio Valley Federation Songs for Triangle Club of All Souls Unitarian Church, Assembled by Mike Selmmanoff (1964–65), Reprinted by E.O. Davisson (1966)
- Hymns for Living, General Assembly of Unitarian and Free Christian Churches (1985)
- Hymns of Faith and Freedom, Unitarian Christian Association (1991)
- Singing the Living Tradition, The Unitarian Universalist Association (1993) ISBN 1-55896-260-3.
- The YRUU Song Book, The Unitarian Universalist Association Youth Office (1997)
- Singing the Journey, Supplement, The Unitarian Universalist Association (2005) ISBN 1-55896-499-1.
- Sing Your Faith, General Assembly of Unitarian and Free Christian Churches (2009) ISBN 978-0-85319-077-6

=== United Church of Christ ===
- Sing! Prayer and Praise, The Pilgrim Press (2009)
- The New Century Hymnal, The Pilgrim Press (1995)
- United Church of Christ Hymnal (1974)
- Pilgrim Hymnal (1958)
- Evangelical and Reformed Hymnal (1941)
- The Hymnal of the Reformed Church (1920)
- The Hymnal of the Reformed Church in the United States (1890)

=== United Pentecostal Church ===
- Pentecostal Praises (1947)
- Pentecostal Hymnal (1948)
- Sing Unto the LORD (1978)

=== Ukrainian Evangelical Pentecostal Church ===
- Songs of Joy, Ukrainian (1932). N.B. The title in English is at the head of the Ukrainian title.

== Roman Catholic hymnals ==
The official sacred music of most of the Roman Catholic Church (specifically, the Roman Rite) is in the form of Gregorian chant, and appears in the Roman Missal and the Roman Gradual. The Missal contains all that is to be sung during Mass by the priest at the altar, while the Gradual contains all the music sung by the choir. The standard Roman Gradual contains complex Gregorian Chant while the Graduale Simplex substitutes easier Gregorian chants. All of these are in Latin, and are published for use throughout most of the Latin Rite (the vast majority of Roman Catholic parishes).

Of Eastern Catholic rites, several of these have hymnals and service books translated in whole or in part into English. The Byzantine Rite Catholics generally use the same music as the Eastern Orthodox, although some specific Catholic translations of some hymn books into English do exist. All of the Byzantine Rite churches, and their Eastern Orthodox counterparts, use essentially the same lyrics in their hymns; the primary difference between different Byzantine Rite Catholic churches, such as between Ukrainian Greek Orthodox Church and the Melkite Catholic Church of Antioch, is in the form of the music used. The churches of the Rusyn ethnic group, which following the Union of Brest became Eastern Catholics developed a form of congregational singing known as Prostopinije; recently, many Rusyns in the United States and central Europe have rejoined the Eastern Orthodox church, but Prostopinije remains in use by both groups of Carpatho-Rusyn heritage, and has been adapted for use in both traditional and modern English.

Of the other Eastern Catholic Rites, the hymnals and service books of the Maronites have been translated into English, however, for other Eastern Catholic rites, often only the Divine Liturgy has been translated into English, frequently without seasonal propers.

The Latin Rite contains three other liturgical traditions still in use: the subtly different Rite of Braga, which is mostly like the Tridentine Mass but differing in a few minor points, historically used in Portugal before the introduction of the Novus Ordo Missae, and the substantially different Ambrosian Rite, used by most Catholic parishes in Milan and some adjoining regions, and the Mozarabic Rite, which is also very different from the Roman Rite; at one time it was the standard liturgy throughout most of Spain during the period of Moorish occupation; later, its use dwindled, and it is now celebrated daily in a single chapel in the Toledo Cathedral built especially for that purpose; it sees very limited use elsewhere. These rites have only partially been translated into English, and are never celebrated in English, the diaspora from their locales having adopted the Roman Rite.

There are also several monastic rites slightly different from the old Tridentine Mass, such as the Dominican Rite and the Carthusian Rite. The latter remains in use, exclusively in Latin; the former was translated entirely into English, but is always celebrated in Latin; its use has become rare, but it is still celebrated on occasion. There exist official English translations of the Missal and Breviary of the Dominican Rite, but not of the other distinctive monastic usages.

It has been the practice to publish hymnals of songs in the vernacular language for more than 400 years, and many of these now contain some Latin Gregorian chants. They include the following:

=== Catholic Church in Australia ===
- Catholic Worship Book II (Official music resource of the Australian Catholic Church)
- Gather Australia
- As One Voice
- Together in Song
- New Living Parish Hymn Book

=== Canadian Conference of Catholic Bishops, Ottawa ===
- Catholic Book of Worship (three editions) (1972,1980,1994)

=== Roman Catholic Archdiocese of Port of Spain ===
- Caribbean Worship and Song (three editions) (2012)

=== Hymnals from third-party publishers in use in the Catholic Church ===
==== Portland, OR: OCP Publications ====
- Journeysongs
  - Journeysongs., 1994, OCLC 31789925
  - Journeysongs. (2nd ed.), ISBN 978-1-57992-112-5
  - Journeysongs (3rd ed.), 2012, ISBN 978-1-57992-151-4
- Glory & Praise Volumes 1,2, & 3 (any one or combination thereof, softbound or hardbound)
- Glory & Praise (Classic Edition, 2nd Edition, Comprehensive, Young People's Edition)
- One Faith, Una Voz, Oregon Catholic Press, 2005, ISBN 978-1-57992-122-4 (bilingual)
- Heritage Missal (Published Yearly, ISSN 1527-6333)
- Today's Missal (Published Yearly, ISSN 0199-8803)
- Breaking Bread (Published Yearly, ISSN 1939-2575)
- Spirit & song: a seeker's guide for liturgy and prayer. Oregon Catholic Press. 1999. ISBN 978-1-57992-007-4.
- Spirit & song 2: more resources for prayer & worship, 2005, ISBN 978-1-57992-129-3
- Catholic Church; United States Conference of Catholic Bishops; Committee on Divine Worship (2013), Spirit & song. (2nd ed.)
- Rise Up and Sing (2 editions)
- Never Too Young: Spirit & Song for Young People, 2007, ISBN 978-1-57992-139-2
- Flor y Canto (Spanish-language hymns)
- Choose Christ Missal
- Thánh Ca Dân Chúa (Vietnamese)

==== Chicago, IL: GIA Publications ====
- Gather Series

- Gather (1988)
- Gather II (1992)
- Gather Comprehensive (1994)
- Gather Comprehensive, 2nd ed. (2006)
- Gather III (2011)
- Gather IV (2021)

- Worship Series

- Worship (1971)
- Worship II (1975)
- Worship III (1986)
- Worship IV (2011)

- Catholic Community Hymnal (1999)
- RitualSong (1996)
- RitualSong II (2018)
- Lead Me, Guide Me (1987)
- Lead Me, Guide Me, 2nd ed. (2011)
- Hymnal for Catholic Students
- Singing Our Faith
- Hymnal for the Hours
- Cross Generation (2009)
- Oramos Cantando/We Pray in Song (2011)
- Resource Collection of Hymns and Service Music for the Liturgy [I.C.E.L.] (1984)

- Voices

==== Chicago, IL: World Library Publications (WLP) A division of GIA ====
- We Celebrate
- Seasonal Missalette (in either standard or revised text editions, large-print or standard-size print)
- People's Mass Book (2003 & 1984 Editions)
- Word & Song (published annually, ISSN 1938-4815)
- Voices as One, Vol. 1 (1998)
- Voices as One, Vol. 2 (2005)
- Celebremos/Let Us Celebrate (bilingual English/Spanish)
- One in Faith (2014)

==== Collegeville, MN: Liturgical Press ====
- McKenna, Edward J, ed. (1990), The Collegeville hymnal, Liturgical Press, ISBN 978-0-8146-1569-0
- Sacred Song (Published Triennially)
- Our Parish Prays and Sings Hymnbook with the daily Mass chants

==== Nashville, TN: International Liturgy Publications ====
- Saint Augustine Hymnal
- Credo Hymnal

==== San Francisco, CA: Ignatius Press ====
- The Adoremus Hymnal (1997)
- Hitchcock, Hellen Hull (2011). The Adoremus Hymnal (2nd ed.). Ignatius Press. ISBN 9781586175207.
- The Ignatius Pew Missal (published annually)

==== Long Prairie, MN: The Neumann Press ====
- St. Gregory Hymnal (2000)

==== Leominster, Herefordshire, UK: Gracewing ====
- The Catholic Hymn Book. 1998. ISBN 0-85244-358-7.

==== Lafayette, IN: St. Boniface Church ====
- The St. Michael Hymnal
  - The St. Michael Hymnal. 1998. OCLC 50853881.
  - Schafer, Linda Powell, ed. (2003). The St. Michael Hymnal (3rd ed.). OCLC 54666463.
  - O'Connor, Michael Dominic (2011). Schafer, Linda Powell (ed.). The St. Michael hymnal (4th ed.). OCLC 773942725.

==== Essex: McCrimmon ====
- Celebration Hymnal for Everyone, published by McCrimmons Publishing Co Ltd., first edition 1994, second edition with supplement 2005, "conforms to the English translation of the revised roman Missal 2010".

==== London: Faber Music ====
- Petti, Anthony G., ed. (1971). New Catholic hymnal. St. Martin's Press. ISBN 978-0-571-10001-9.

==== Summit, NJ: Dominican Nuns of Summit ====
- The Summit Choirbook, 1983, LCCN 87752089

==== Corpus Christi, TX: Corpus Christi Watershed ====
- Vatican II Hymnal. 2011. OCLC 919217565.
- Ostrowski, Jeff, ed. (2012). Saint Edmund Campion missal & hymnal for the traditional Latin mass.
- Saint Jean de Brébeuf Hymnal (2019)

==== Mundelein, IL: Illuminare Publications ====
- Lumen Christi Series
  - Bartlett, Adam, ed. (2014). Lumen Christi Hymnal. Illuminare Publications. ISBN 978-0-9916560-2-8.
  - Bartlett, Adam, ed. (2014). Lumen Christi: simple gradual. Illuminare Publications. ISBN 978-0-9916560-1-1.

=== Hymnals published privately ===
==== St. Paul's Choir School ====
- The St. Paul's Hymnal (2015)

== Major interdenominational Protestant hymnals ==
- African American Heritage Hymnal, GIA Publications (2001)
- Celebration Hymnal: songs and hymns for worship, published by Word Music/Integrity Music (1997). This is different from Celebration Hymnal for Everyone published by McCrimmon Publishing Co Ltd. (1994, 2005 with Supplement).
- Christian Life Hymnal, Hendrickson Publishers (2006)
- Favorite Hymns of Praise, Hope Publishing (1967)
- Great Hymns of the Faith, Brentwood Music (1968)
- Heavenly Highway Hymns, Stamps-Baxter Music and Printing Company
- The Hymnal for Worship and Celebration, Word Music (1986)
- Hymns for the Family of God, Brentwood Music (1976)
- Hymns For The Living Church, Hope Publishing (1974)
- Hymns for Today's Church, Jubilate Hymns (1982) – predominantly evangelical Anglican
- Keswick Hymn Book, Marshall, Morgan & Scott (1938)
- Hymns Selected and Original for the use of Teachers and Scholars or The Sunday School Union Hymn Book, pub. John Heaton of Leeds, ed. John Peele Clapham (1833, many editions, and now online)
- Mission Praise HarperCollins (several editions 1980s onwards)
- A New Hymnal for Colleges and Schools, Yale University Press (1992)
- The Psalms of David Imitated, by Isaac Watts, (1719)
- Recueil de chant maçonnique, éd. 1984 (words only, in French, of Christian-compatible Masonic hymns)
- Redemption Hymnal (1951)
- Sacred Songs and Solos, Marshall, Morgan & Scott (1921)
- The Sing! Hymnal, Crossway (2025), created by Keith and Kristyn Getty
- Sing Joyfully, Tabernacle (1989)
- Sing the Faith, Geneva Press (1993)
- Triumphant Service Songs (1934)
- Worship & Rejoice, Hope Publishing (2003)
- The Worshiping Church, Hope Publishing (1990)
- Majesty Hymns, Majesty Music (1996)
- Rejoice Hymns, Majesty Music (2011)
- Christian Hymns (hymnbook), Evangelical Movement of Wales (1977; 2d edn. 2004)
- Banner Anniversary hymnal – Australia

== Eastern Orthodox hymnals ==
The Eastern Orthodox Church uses hymnals or service books consisting chiefly of the words to hymns; separate volumes, which vary by jurisdiction (for example, the Russian Orthodox Church or Greek Orthodox Church) contain the actual musical notation. Byzantine Chant is the original musical tradition of the Eastern Orthodox Church, but this developed into a large number of regional variations, including the tonal, polyphonic four-part harmony of the Russian, Ukrainian and Bulgarian churches, and the three part melodies of the Church of Georgia.

All of the Eastern Orthodox and Byzantine Catholic churches share a common set of hymnals, which provide the basic text for the hymns. The Octoechos contains the hymns sung in each of the eight tones, used throughout most of the year; the Triodion contains the special hymns and liturgical propers of Lent and Holy Week, the Pentecostarion, also known as the Flowery Triodion, contains the equivalent proper hymns for Pascha (Easter), Bright Week, and the period of time lasting through the liturgical season generally known as Eastertide in the West, including the feast of the Ascension, Pentecost and culminating on the first Sunday after Pentecost, All Saints Day (according to the Byzantine liturgical calendar.

The Menaion contains the hymns for various holidays and feasts throughout the year. Variants of it include the Festal Menaion, containing only the most important feasts of the Lord and of the Theotokos, the General Menaion, which provides abstract services for particular classes of saint, and the Monthly Menaion, a twelve volume set, all of which has been translated into English, containing all the proper hymns (canons, troparia, kontakia) for the feast says of individual saints throughout the year. Lastly, the Irmologion, not specifically translated into English but included in other volumes, such as some editions of the Octoechos and Pentecostarion, contains the Irmoi, a standard set of responsaries sung during the canons at Matins.

All of these works aside from the Irmologion exist in English translations, in various forms, including anthologies. One of the oldest and most comprehensive is The Divine Prayers and Services of the Orthodox Church, compiled by Fr. Seraphim Nassar, which contains substantial excerpts from the Octoechos, the Menaion, the Triodion and the Pentecostarion.

== Oriental Orthodox hymnals ==
Like the Byzantine Rite, the West Syriac Rite uses an eight mode system of chant similar to Byzantine Chant and Gregorian Chant, however, traditionally this was not notated, but rather, the melodies were passed down via oral tradition. The principal hymnal of the Syriac Orthodox Church is the Beth Gazo ("Treasury"); proper hymns for various feasts are also found in the books of the liturgy, the Shi'mo, or Divine Office, and the Fanqitho, which replaces the Shi'mo in Great Lent, Holy Week, Pascha and during major feasts throughout the church year. Of these, only the book of the Liturgy containing the Anaphoras in various forms and the Shi'mo, have been translated into English.

The Coptic Rite also lacks a system of musical notation; its system of chant, Tasbeha, is somewhat less complex than West Syriac Chant; it is not based on eight modes, but rather a few sets of melodies for use on different occasions; it is passed down primarily as oral tradition, and certain portions of it, for example the chanting of the priests, rely on improvization based on the use of standard musical phrases. The Coptic Euchologion contains the hymns of the Divine Liturgy, whereas the books of the Annual Psalmody and the Khiak Psalmody contain the hymns of the divine office, the latter specifically for the season of Advent. There is also a book of offices for Holy Week, and various books containing special services such as funerals, marriages and ordinations, all of which have been translated into English. There also exist trilingual hymnals containing the Divine Liturgy of St. Basil set to Western notation.

In contrast, both the Armenian Rite and Ethiopian Rite make use of musical notation, which in the case of the Ethiopian church is ancient, dating back to the 6th century; however, these churches serve their liturgies exclusively in Classical Armenian and Ge'ez respectively, and consequently, very little of their hymnals or other service books have been translated into English. The hymnals and service books of the Ethiopian church are particularly obscure.

== Hymnals of the Church of the East ==
The Assyrian Church of the East, the Ancient Church of the East, the Chaldean Catholic Church and the Syro Malabar Catholic Church use the East Syriac Rite, which like the West Syriac Rite lacks a system of musical notation and is instead passed down through oral tradition; it makes use of the following hymnals: the "Turgama" (Interpretation), containing hymns sung by deacons during the liturgy (our Graduals and Sequences), the David (Dawidha = Psalter), "Khudhra" (= "cycle", containing antiphons, responsories, hymns, and collects for all Sundays), "Kash Kõl" (= "Collection of all"; the same chants for week-days), "Kdham u-Wathar" (= "Before and after"; certain prayers, psalms, and collects most often used, from the other books), "Gezza" ("Treasury", services for feast-days), Abu-Halim (the name of the compiler, containing collects for the end of the Nocturns on Sundays), "Bautha d'Ninwaie" (= "Prayer of the Ninevites", a collection of hymns ascribed to St. Ephraem, used in Lent). The Baptism Office ("Taksa d'Amadha") is generally bound up with the Liturgies. The "Taksa d'Siamidha" has the ordination services. The "Taksa d'Husaia" contains the office for Penance, the "Kthawa d'Burrakha" is the marriage service, the "Kahneita", the burial of clergy, the "Annidha" that of laymen. Lastly the "Khamis" and "Warda" are further collections of hymns (see Badger, "The Nestorians and their Rituals", London, 1852, II, 16–25). Naturally not every church possesses this varied collection of books, and most have not been translated into English. Nonetheless, there are 19th century translations available of the Divine Liturgy and the Divine Office.

== See also ==
- List of Chinese hymn books
