= James Quinn (Jesuit) =

British hymnwriter (1919–2010)

The Reverend James Quinn S.J.
- Born: 21 April 1919; Glasgow, Scotland
- Died: 8 April 2010 (aged 90); Edinburgh, Scotland
- Occupations: Jesuit Priest, theologian, hymnodist

Ecclesiastical career
- Church: Roman Catholic
- Ordained: 1950

James Quinn, SJ (21 April 1919 – 8 April 2010) was a Scottish Jesuit priest, theologian and hymnodist.

== Early life and education ==
Born in Glasgow, Scotland, he was educated at St. Aloysius' College, Glasgow (1926–1935) and at the University of Glasgow (1935–1939), achieving honours with an MA in Classics. He entered the Society of Jesus and made his novitiate from 1939 to 1941. This was followed by studies of philosophy at Heythrop College, Oxfordshire (1941–1944). Quinn became Classics Master at Preston Catholic College (1944–1948) before returning to Heythrop College to complete his studies in Theology (1948–1952).

== Career ==
He was ordained priest at Stonyhurst College on 9 September 1950. After completing a last year of spiritual formation, called 'Tertianship', at St. Beuno's College, North Wales (1952–1953), he became Classics Master at Wimbledon College (1954–1955) and was then appointed to the Sacred Heart Church, Edinburgh in 1955. He served as prefect of studies in the novitiate in Woodhall House, Edinburgh 1963–1966 and after a further period at Sacred Heart, was seconded as spiritual director to the Beda College, Rome (1976–1980). He then returned to Sacred Heart parish for a third term.

During the 1980s, Father Quinn frequently acted as a locum priest to the parish of St Joachims, Wick, Caithness., Scotland. His gentle manner was much appreciated.

== Ecumenical emphasis ==
Quinn was especially involved in ecumenical matters. In the Secretariat for Promoting Christian Unity, he was observer at the General Assembly of the World Alliance of Reformed Churches at Frankfurt in 1964, was consultor to the Secretariat 1968–1973, and was consultant at the World Council of Churches Faith and Order meeting at Leuven, Belgium, in 1972 and at the fourth session of the SPCU/WARC dialogues at Zeist, the Netherlands, in 1973. In the British Council of Churches he participated in its Faith and Order Conference in 1964 and in its Church Leaders' Conference in 1972; and, on behalf of the Scottish Catholic Hierarchy, was consultant/observer from 1966 and consultant to the board of its division of Ecumenical Affairs from 1975. In the Commission for Christian Unity (formerly the National Ecumenical Commission of Scotland) he was secretary of the Joint Study Group (with the Scottish Episcopal Church) from 1968 to 1976, and was a member of the Joint Commission on Christian Marriage, and of the Dialogue on the Mutual Recognition of Baptism (both with the Church of Scotland). In 1987 Cardinal Keith O'Brien appointed him Episcopal Vicar for Ecumenism in the Archdiocese of Edinburgh.

== Consultancy and writing ==
Quinn was a member of the Scottish Religious Advisory Committee of the BBC from 1963–1967. He wrote articles, reviews and pamphlets on theological and doctrinal matters, contributed articles to the New Catholic Encyclopedia and A Catholic Dictionary of Theology, and published The Theology of the Eucharist in 1973. He was a translator and consultant to the Catholic Church's International Commission on English in the Liturgy (ICEL) from 1969 and was a member of its advisory committee from 1972 to 1976. In the 1960s Quinn was vice postulator for the cause for the canonisation of John Ogilvie SJ, Scotland's only post-reformation and only Jesuit saint.

== Hymns ==
He was one of the leading 20th century hymnwriters and produced two collections: New Hymns for All Seasons (1969) and Praise for All Seasons: the hymns of James Quinn SJ (1994). Hymns from both collections are in use by Christian denominations throughout the world. Some of his better-known hymns are:

- "Let all be one in mind and heart"
- "Sing all creation, sing to God in gladness"
- "How deep the riches of our God"
- "Day is done, but Love unfailing"
- "Lord, bid your servant go in peace"
- "Easter glory fills the sky"
- "Peace with the Father, peace with Christ his Son"
- "Father of mercy, God of consolation"
- "May flights of angels lead you on your way"
- "This is my will, my one command"
- "This day God gives me strength of high heaven"
- "Forth in the peace of Christ we go"
- "I am the holy vine"
- "The bread that we break"
- "Lord make us servants of your peace"
- "Now from the heavens descending"
- "O Child of promise, come!"

== Later life and death ==
Quinn lived in retirement at St. Joseph's House in Edinburgh. During his later years his production of hymns was limited by the effects of Alzheimer's disease. He died on 8 April 2010.

== Sources ==
- A Companion to Together in Song, Wesley Milgate and D’Arcy Wood, The Australian Hymn Book Pty Ltd, Sydney, 2006.
