= Natalie Sleeth =

American composer (1930–1992)

- Born: Natalie Allyn Wakeley; October 29, 1930; Evanston, Illinois, U.S.
- Died: March 21, 1992 (aged 61); Denver, Colorado, U.S.
- Education: Wellesley College
- Occupation: Composer

Natalie Allyn Sleeth (née Wakeley; October 29, 1930 – March 21, 1992) was an American composer of hymns and choral music.

Sleeth was born in Evanston, Illinois. She began to study the piano at the early age of four. In 1952, she earned a BA in music theory at Wellesley College in Massachusetts. She married the Rev. Dr. Ronald E. Sleeth, a professor of Homiletics.

Sleeth received an honorary doctorate from West Virginia Wesleyan College in 1989, and then from Nebraska Wesleyan University in 1990. An organist, she wrote over 180 highly successful selections for church and school, with works published by Choristers Guild and Hope Publishing. One of Sleeth's best-known anthems for the choir is entitled "Joy in the Morning" and was written for the West Virginia Wesleyan College concert chorale on the occasion of her husband's inauguration as president of the college in 1977.

The anthem "Hymn of Promise" was composed in early 1985, and dedicated simply "To Ron," that is, her husband Dr. Ron Sleeth, who was diagnosed with cancer and died weeks after the anthem's premiere. Soon after publication, the anthem became a hymn under two different names. Under the title "In the Bulb There is a Flower," it appears as hymn #703 in the United Church of Canada hymnal, Voices United and as hymn #433 in The New Century Hymnal produced by the United Church of Christ in the US. It appears as hymn #707 under the title "Hymn of Promise" in The United Methodist Hymnal. It is frequently sung in the United Church of Canada and the United Church of Christ. The hymn was translated into German by Lothar Pöll in 1999 and is included in the Gesangbuch der Evangelisch-methodistischen Kirche.

== Death ==
Sleeth died of cancer in Denver, Colorado in 1992, aged 61. She was a member of the Highland Park United Methodist Church in Dallas, Texas.
