= Singing the Faith =

Methodist Church of Great Britain hymnal

Singing the Faith is the current authorised hymnbook of the Methodist Church of Great Britain, first published in 2011.

== Background ==
Singing the Faith is the latest in a line of hymnbooks going back to A Collection of Hymns for the Use of The People Called Methodists (1779) by John Wesley and Charles Wesley.

The decision to produce a 21st-century hymnbook was taken at the Methodist Conference of 2009. Since the publication of the previous authorised hymnbook, Hymns and Psalms, in 1983, many new hymns and contemporary worship songs had appeared, reflecting current concerns and forms of expression. The objective was to produce a book that represented both modern and traditional hymnody while reflecting the doctrines, beliefs and emphases of Methodism in the 21st century. The opportunity was taken to remove non-inclusive language, especially by using gender-neutral language as far as possible. The new hymn collection was authorised by the Methodist Conference in 2010.

== Contents ==
Out of the 748 hymns and songs in the collection, 89 were written by Charles Wesley (1707–88), one of the founders of Methodism. The most represented hymnwriter of the 20th and 21st centuries is John L. Bell (b. 1949), who has 43 hymns included.

== Singing the Faith Plus ==
Singing the Faith Plus is an electronic hymn resource "designed to support and complement" the published book. As well as a comprehensive index of hymns and songs, it allows members to submit their own works. As of 2025 the hymn resource has been subsumed under the Methodist Resource Hub.

== See also ==
- List of English-language hymnals by denomination
- Congregational singing
