= Lutheran Hymnal with Supplement =

Lutheran hymnal published in 1989

The Lutheran Hymnal with Supplement is the second official hymnal of the Lutheran Church of Australia, first published in its present form in 1989.

== Precursors ==
Prior to 1966, Australia was home to two separate Lutheran synods - the Evangelical Lutheran Church of Australia (ELCA) and the United Evangelical Lutheran Church in Australia (UELCA.), both based in South Australia. Both used liturgical material inherited from their ancestors in Europe, mainly in the German language, together with some material from the Lutheran Church–Missouri Synod in the United States.

== Australian Lutheran Hymn Book ==
In order to standardise the music and liturgies found across their congregations, the ELCA. decided, in or about 1920, to produce a completely home-grown hymnal. According to the Preface to the Hymnal with Supplement, this work, the Australian Lutheran Hymn Book, was first published as a word edition in 1922, with the accompanying tune edition following in 1925. It contained, in addition to over 600 hymns, two settings of the Divine Service (one translated from German sources, known as the 'Common Service', and the other from the United States, known as 'Another Order of Service'), Collects and Propers, Orders for Matins and Vespers, and various other liturgical material, together with several chants. Though some hymns were of English origin, the overwhelming majority of the hymns in this book were translated from German, reflecting the heritage of the Lutheran Church. None of the hymns were of Australian origin.

Dissatisfaction first arose with the Australian Lutheran Hymn Book in the late 1940s, when, again according to the Preface of the Hymnal with Supplement, the UELCA decided to publish a supplement and a new tune edition to the Australian Lutheran Hymn Book. Both of the Lutheran Churches in Australia subsequently resolved not to revise the existing hymnal, but to produce a completely new one.

== Lutheran Hymnal ==
The first meeting of the committee that was to produce this new hymnal was held on 23 August 1951, in Adelaide, South Australia. The committee was composed of members of both churches, all pastors, with Dr. M. Lohe of the UELCA elected chairman. In 1966, after over a decade of work, the committee had prepared new orders of service, using similar orders to those found in the Lutheran Church–Missouri Synod of the United States, but with musical settings adapted from those in use in the United Evangelical Lutheran Church of Germany. Orders of Divine Service with and without Holy Communion and of Matins and Vespers were prepared. These became official in 1966, though the hymnal they were to appear in had not yet been produced at that time.

By June 1973 the hymnological material had been prepared, and the Lutheran Hymnal was published by the Lutheran Publishing House in Adelaide. At this time, the Australian Lutheran Hymn Book became obsolete. It is from this Lutheran Hymnal that the Lutheran Hymnal with Supplement is revised. The Lutheran Hymnal contained 729 hymns, in addition to the Orders of Service noted above, with the propers for the Christian year, Morning and Evening Prayer, and lists of suggested hymns. It was a conservative hymnal, and continued to use the now-dated forms of 'Thou' and 'Thy' instead of 'You' and 'Your' when referring to the Trinity. Such usage was reflected in the hymns, again mainly of German origin, but with a higher proportion of Anglican hymns, and several composed by Australians. This book remained in use for the next decade, and is referred to by many Australian Lutherans as the Black Hymnbook because it came in only one colour, black.

== Lutheran Hymnal with Supplement ==
The Lutheran Hymnal was the last, and possibly the best, hymnal for an age that was, even as it came off the printing press, passing away. Through the 1970s, many fine spiritual songs were composed, and the dignified but conservative nature of the Orders of Service prepared in 1966 no longer found ready appeal among the younger members of the Lutheran Church of Australia, which subsequently resolved to revise the existing hymnal. The result was the Supplement to the Lutheran Hymnal. Its Preface states that the times were "rapidly changing", and that there was an "ever-growing demand for hymns and orders of service which are not available in the current hymn books...this Supplement is not meant to displace the hymn book of the Church, but to be...a supplement."

The supplement was first made available in 1987, in the form of a small red booklet containing the revised Orders of Service, with 174 newer hymns which did not appear in the Lutheran Hymnal. The two works first appeared as a combined edition in 1989, and the Lutheran Hymnal with Supplement was born, known as the "Red Hymnbook".

While the hymns which appeared in the 1973 edition remain unchanged, the Orders of Service have been revised and updated, though they are substantially the same as they were in 1973. The Propers, with the lists of suggested hymns, have been deleted as being of little or no use to the layman. The Hymnal with Supplement also contains a second setting of Divine Service, called the "Contemporary Order". Confusingly, around the same time, a completely new setting of Divine Service was printed, to go with the All Together, Now! series of spiritual song-books, themselves of Lutheran origin. These orders have supplanted the Hymnal with Supplement in some congregations.

The Lutheran Hymnal with Supplement remains the official hymnal of the Lutheran Church of Australia, though in recent years even its revisions have been regarded as conservative, and it has fallen out of use in some congregations where a more contemporary approach to worship is taken.

== See also ==
- List of English-language hymnals by denomination
