= Trinity Hymnal =

Presbyterian song book, first compiled 1961

The Trinity Hymnal is a Christian hymnal written and compiled both by and for those from a Presbyterian background. It has been released in two editions (both of which are used in churches today) and is published by Great Commission Publications, a joint project between the Orthodox Presbyterian Church and the Presbyterian Church in America.

A Baptist Edition also exists for the use of Particular Baptist congregations.

== Versions ==
The 1961 hymnal was originally compiled by the Orthodox Presbyterian Church in 1961 as a hymnbook that would include traditional hymns as well as musical arrangements of the Psalms suitable for Reformed worship.

The 1990 hymnal is official (but not required) in the Presbyterian Church in America and Orthodox Presbyterian Church, and is also approved by denominations such as the Associate Reformed Presbyterian Church. This version includes responsive readings from all 150 Psalms and The Westminster Confession of Faith.

== The Baptist Edition ==
In 1995, the Trinity Hymnal (Baptist Edition) was published and is identical to the 1961 hymnal, other than an addition of 42 Psalter selections, and a few changes related to doctrine. Hymns supporting infant baptism were replaced with ones about believer's baptism, and the Westminster Confession of Faith was replaced by the Second London Confession of Faith.

== See also ==
- List of Presbyterian Hymnals
