= D'Arcy Wood =

Australian minister (born 1936)

The Reverend D'Arcy Wood
- Born: Harold D'Arcy Wood; 9 December 1936 (age 89); Tongatapu, Tonga
- Occupation: Minister
- Children: Miriam Pohlenz, Gillen D'Arcy Wood
- Parent(s): Harold Wood, Olive K. Wood (née O'Reilly)
- Relatives: Winston O'Reilly (cousin), Elizabeth Wood-Ellem and Monica Maughan (siblings)
- Education: Princeton Theological Seminary

Ecclesiastical career
- Religion: Christian
- Church: Methodist Church of Australasia then Uniting Church in Australia (UCA)
- Offices held: UCA: President of Assembly (1991–1994) and Moderator of the Synod of South Australia (1981–1983); Australian Council of Churches President 1984–1988

Harold D'Arcy Wood (born 9 December 1936) is an Australian semi-retired minister of the Uniting Church in Australia (UCA) and was President of the UCA Assembly from 1991 to 1994. He has been active in ecumenism in Australia and globally.

== Childhood and family ==
H. D'Arcy Wood (known as D'Arcy) is the son of the Reverend Dr Harold Wood (1896–1989), a Methodist then Uniting Church minister and missionary in Tonga, and medical doctor Olive K. Wood (née O'Reilly). He is a brother to historian Elizabeth Wood-Ellem and actor Monica Maughan. His cousin Winston O'Reilly was the second President of the UCA Assembly.

== Education ==
Ordained into the Methodist Church of Australasia, Wood completed his theological education and doctorate at Princeton Theological Seminary.

== Career ==
From 1974 to 1988, Rev. Dr Wood lectured in systematic theology and liturgy at the then Parkin-Wesley Theological College in Adelaide, South Australia. He was moderator of the Synod of South Australia from 1981 to 1983. Wood was a staff member of the Australian Council of Churches from 1969 to 1973 and president of that body from 1984 to 1988. He was also involved in the National Council of Churches in Australia since its formation.

His involvements include:

- member of the Australian Institute of Health and Welfare's ethics committee
- member of the World Council of Churches' special commission on Orthodox participation in the WCC and he contributed to that commission choosing to operate with a consensus decision making process, having been involved in its introduction in the UCA
- past editorial committee member of the replacement for the Australian Hymn Book and Together in Song and compiler of the Companion to Together in Song (2006)

In 2015, Wood travelled to his country of birth to crown Tupou VI, the King of Tonga, in a coronation ceremony at Centenary Church, Nuku'alofa.

== Awards ==
- 1999: Percy Jones Award for outstanding service to liturgical music
- 2003: Named an associate of the Royal School of Church Music (based in the United Kingdom)

== Publications ==
- Gillman, Ian; Wood, H. D'Arcy (1971), Towards an informed decision on the Basis of union : prepared for the Congregational Union of Australia, the Methodist Church of Australia, the Presbyterian Church of Australia : a commentary on the revised Basis of union (1971), Joint Board of Christian Education of Australia and New Zealand
- Australian Council of Churches; Wood, D'Arcy, 1936-, (ed.) (1972), Churches and councils - Australia and the world : three statements on the ecumenical situation today, Australian Council of Churches, ISBN 978-0-85821-008-0
- Wood, D'Arcy (1974), What future for the Australian churches?, Leigh College, ISBN 978-0-9598690-3-3
- Wood, D'Arcy; Watt, John, 1941-; Joint Board of Christian Education of Australia and New Zealand; Uniting Church in Australia. Commission on Liturgy (1981), Introducing the 1981 services of Baptism : especially for ministers and elders, Uniting Church in Australia Assembly Commission on Liturgy in co-operation with the Joint Board of Christian Education of Australia and New Zealand, ISBN 978-0-85819-313-0
- Blake, A. J. (Alastair Joseph); Wood, D'Arcy, 1936-; Dodd, Lindsay; Uniting Church in Australia. Synod of South Australia. Social Justice Commission; Uniting Church in Australia. Synod of South Australia. Christian Education Committee (1982), Uranium, a nuclear dilemma : a concerned examination of nuclear energy and its consequences, Social Justice Commission & the Christian Education Committee of the Synod of South Australia, Uniting Church in Australia, ISBN 978-0-909834-60-9
- Wood, D'Arcy; Joint Board of Christian Education (1986), Building on a solid basis : a guide to The basis of union of the Uniting Church in Australia, Joint Board of Christian Education, ISBN 978-0-85819-581-3
- Wood, D'Arcy (1986), Building on a solid basis, Uniting Church Press, 1986, ISBN 978-0-85719-581-4
- Wood, H. D'Arcy (2000), "The Holy Spirit and the stranger within the gates: Wesleyanism and the Uniting Church in Australia [Paper in: Greek Australian Cultural Forum (2nd: 2000)]", Phronema, 15 (2000): 77–86, ISSN 0819-4920
- Wood, D'Arcy; Uniting Church Historical Society (S. Aust.) (2004), Liturgy from the ground up : a Uniting Church journey, 1975-90, Historical Society of the Uniting Church in South Australia, ISBN 978-1-86457-029-8
- Milgate, Wesley; Wood, D'Arcy, 1936- (2006), A companion to Together in song : Australian hymn book II, Australian Hymn Book, ISBN 978-0-646-45712-3

Religious titles
Preceded by Ronald Wilson	President of the Assembly, Uniting Church in Australia; July 1991-July 1994	Succeeded by Jill Tabart
