= Winston O'Reilly =

The Reverend Winston D'Arcy O'Reilly OBE
- Born: 24 April 1913; Roseville, Sydney, New South Wales, Australia
- Died: 16 January 2000 (aged 86); Belrose, Sydney, New South Wales, Australia
- Occupation: UCA minister
- Spouses: Doreen (Dorn) Doyle (married 1939–1974); Nancye Haines (married 1976)
- Children: Elizabeth Walker, Robert O'Reilly, Geoffrey O'Reilly
- Parent(s): Henry D'Arcy O’Reilly (merchant) and Lillian Edith O’Reilly (nee Brasnett)
- Relatives: A. Harold Wood (uncle), H. D'Arcy Wood (cousin)

Winston D'Arcy O'Reilly was a Methodist and then Uniting Church in Australia (UCA) minister and the second President of the UCA Assembly.

== Education ==
O'Reilly went to North Sydney Boys High School, leaving at 14 years of age. Returning to Sydney after a trip to Europe, he studied for the Leaving Certificate at night school. He attended Wesley College, University of Sydney, and received a BA (1935) and MA (1937), before training for the Methodist ministry at Leigh College. He later completed a Master of Arts in Christian Education (1962) and an MEd (1963).

== Career ==
At 14, O'Reilly started training as carpenter and at 16 travelled to England as companion and carer to a man with a disability. After his ordination he was the minister at a number of Methodist churches throughout New South Wales, later taking positions with the Methodist Conference and Methodist schools and higher education (including Vice Principal of Leigh College, 1949–1959; Principal of Methodist Ladies' College, Burwood, 1960–1965; Connexional Secretary, 1964–1974; Secretary of Conference, 1968; President of Conference, 1969; Secretary General, 1972–1974; President-General, 1975–1977.

O'Reilly played a key role in planning for the formation of the Uniting Church in Australia as Planning Officer for Union of Congregational, Methodist and Presbyterian Churches (1974-1977), then became the first General Secretary of the Uniting Church in Australia (1977-1979) and second President of the Assembly (1979-1982).

Internationally he was a Member of Presidium, World Methodist Council, 1975–1980.

Through discussions with Labor's attorney-general, Lionel Murphy, about reform of the divorce laws he had considerable influence on the Family Law Act 1975.

He was founding member of the NSW Council of Social Service and one of the founders of the Australian Council of Social Service (ACOSS, he later became ACOSS's chairman).

== Family ==
He was married twice, on 23 March 1939 at Roseville, New South Wales to Doreen 'Dorn' Doyle (died 2 December 1974) with three children and in 1976 to Nancye Ruth Haines (died 23 November 2011).

O'Reilly's parents were Henry D'Arcy O’Reilly (merchant, he was a haberdasher near Chatswood Station} and Lillian Edith O’Reilly (née Brasnett). His father was the brother-in-law of A. Harold Wood, whose son, D'Arcy Wood, was the sixth President of the Uniting Church in Australia Assembly.

A daughter and a grandson are Uniting Church ministers.

Religious titles
Preceded by Davis McCaughey	President of the Assembly, Uniting Church in Australia; 1979–1982	Succeeded by Rollie Busch
