= Yes, Lord! =

Hymnal used by the Church of God in Christ

Yes, Lord! is the hymnal used by the Church of God in Christ. It was published in 1985 by the COGIC Publishing Board under the leadership of a on Bishop J.O. Patterson, Sr.

== List of Hymns ==
- The Yes Lord Praise
- A Mighty Fortress Is Our God
- Amazing Grace
- Are You Washed in The Blood (written by Elisha Hoffman)
- Glory to his Name
- Old Rugged Cross
- My Savior Didst Die, but He Rose Up Again
- I'm Saved By his Power Divine
- Jesus keep me near the cross
- Glory, Glory, Hallelujah
- O Beautiful
- The Star-Spangled Banner
- God's Not Dead, He's Yet Alive
- Hark! The Herald Angels Sing
- Silent Night
- Joy to the World
- We Three Kings of Orient Are
- The First Noel
- O Little Town of Bethlehem
- O Come All Ye Faithful
- He Arose
- The Hallelujah Chorus
- What a mighty God we serve
- Jesus is Able to save a poor sinner
- My God is Able
- Praise Him
- Holy, Holy, Holy, Lord God Almighty
- He's a wonderful God
- Jesus the solid Rock
- The Blood Prevails
- There is a fountain filled with blood
- I know it was Jesus' blood that saved me
- Nobody Like You, Jesus
- Near the Cross
- Praise God, Praise Jesus, and Praise the Holy Ghost
- 'Tis so sweet
- Yield Not to Temptation
- My Soul Loves Jesus
- Jesus loves me
- Holy Ghost overshadow me
- How great is our God
- God of our Fathers
- Hallelujah, 'Tis Done
- Nothin' But The Blood Of Jesus
- Victory in Jesus
- I found Jesus and I'm glad
- God is My Everything

== See also ==
- List of English-language hymnals by denomination
