= Redemption Hymnal =

1951 hymnbook

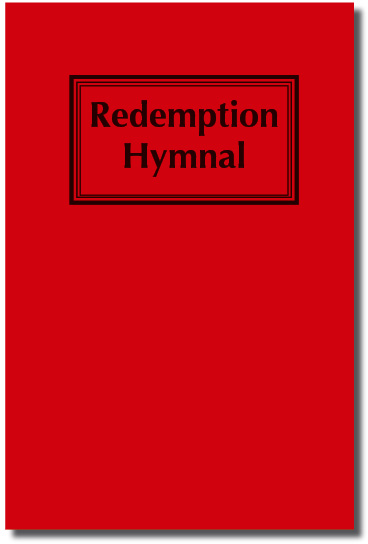
Redemption Hymnal - 2006 Words Edition

The Redemption Hymnal is a red-covered hymnbook containing 800 evangelical hymns, first published by the Elim Publishing House in London, in 1951. The hymnal was compiled by a committee of leaders from the three main Pentecostal denominations in the United Kingdom: Assemblies of God in Great Britain, Elim Pentecostal Church and the Apostolic Church. It is strongly associated with the emergence of the Pentecostal movement in the United Kingdom.

The preface proclaimed: "This collection of hymns has been compiled to meet the need of companies of believers all over the British Isles who are rejoicing in a scriptural experience of the grace and power of the Holy Spirit similar, they humbly affirm, to that received by the early Christians on the Day of Pentecost, and enjoyed throughout the primitive apostolic churches. ... A hymnal is now proffered that combines rich devotional hymns in abundance with stirring revival hymns that present the gospel in all its depth, winsomeness and simplicity." The hymnal was traditionally used by classical Pentecostal churches.

Several hundred hymns in the collection go back to the Sacred Songs and Solos collected by Ira D. Sankey, with the list of older hymns including "O for a Thousand Tongues to Sing" by Charles Wesley, "Just as I Am" by Charlotte Elliott, and "Abide with Me" by Henry Francis Lyte. Further hymns, written as a direct result of specifically Pentecostal experiences, were also included, such as "Of gifts and powers miraculous" and "Blow Pentecostal breeze", both by Harold Horton

Although revised as the New Redemption Hymnal in 1986, the original collection was republished in 2006 by Rickfords Hill Publishing.

== See also ==
- List of English-language hymnals by denomination
