= Jill Tabart =

Australian minister (born 1941)

Jill Tabart OAM
- Born: 1941 (age 84–85); Melbourne
- Education: University of Melbourne 1958-1964
- Occupations: lay leader and general practitioner
- Spouse: Ken (married 1966)
- Children: 4

Jillian Claire Tabart OAM (born 1941) is a former president of the Assembly of the Uniting Church in Australia and medical practitioner. She served a three-year term as president of the assembly from July 1994 to July 1997, and was the first woman to be elected to the role.

Tabart's father was a Methodist lay preacher. She was born in Melbourne and studied at Methodist Ladies' College, Kew and University of Melbourne. She married Ken in 1966 and the family moved to Tasmania in 1969, initially to Hobart, then to Launceston, following his work opportunities. She was elected Moderator of the Uniting Church Synod of Tasmania, serving in that role from 1983 to 1984.

Tabart was awarded the Medal of the Order of Australia (OAM) in the 2022 Australia Day Honours for "service to the Uniting Church in Australia".

Religious titles
Preceded by Rev D'Arcy Wood	President of the Assembly, Uniting Church in Australia; July 1994-July 1997	Succeeded by John Mavor
