= Matthew Bridges =

English hymnodist (1800–1894)

- Born: Matthew Bridges; 14 July 1800; Essex, England
- Died: 6 October 1894 (aged 94); Sidmouth, Devon, England
- Occupation: Hymnodist

Matthew Bridges (14 July 1800 – 6 October 1894) was a British-Canadian hymnodist.

== Life ==
Bridges was born in Essex, England on 14 July 1800, the youngest son of John Bridges of Maldon, Essex and brother of the Rev Charles Bridges, a priest of the Church of England. He matriculated at Magdalen Hall, Oxford in 1831.

Matthew Bridges' career as an author began with his poem Jerusalem Regained at the age of 25 in 1825. Although in his early life Bridges (who was raised in a Church of England environment) was skeptical of Roman Catholicism as evidenced by his 1828 book The Roman Empire Under Constantine the Great, the influence of John Henry Cardinal Newman led him to convert to Roman Catholicism in 1848 at the age of 48, a faith to which he adhered for the remaining four-and-a-half decades of his life.

Later in life, Bridges lived for a time in Quebec, Canada, but returned to England and died in Sidmouth, Devon on 6 October 1894 at the age of 94. He is buried there in the cemetery of the Convent of the Assumption.

== Works ==
Some of the more popular hymns written by Bridges include:

- Behold the Lamb of God! O Thou for sinners slain. This hymn is included in the 1861 edition of the Hymns Ancient and Modern.
- Crown Him with Many Crowns
- Man of sorrows, wrapt in grief
- My God, accept my heart this day
