= The New Oxford Book of Carols =

1992 book by Hugh Keyte and Andrew Parrott

New Oxford Book of Carols
- Author: Hugh Keyte, Andrew Parrott
- Publisher: Oxford University Press
- Publication date: 1992
- Media type: Print
- Pages: 736
- ISBN: 978-0-19-353323-3
- OCLC: 40531359
- Website: The New Oxford Book of Carols on OUP.com

The New Oxford Book of Carols is a collection of vocal scores of Christmas carols. It was first published in 1992 by Oxford University Press (OUP) and was edited by Hugh Keyte and Andrew Parrott. It is a widely used source of carols in among choirs and church congregations in Britain.

The collection was published as a successor to the Oxford Book of Carols, originally published in 1928. This thoroughly documented text contains notes on sources, histories and variants of carols from a wide variety of sources; it is usable not only as a book for carol singing, but as a reference book as well. A Shorter New Oxford Book of Carols was issued in 1992, and other selections have been made.

== History ==
The original Oxford Book of Carols was first published in 1928 by OUP. It was edited by Percy Dearmer, Martin Shaw, and the noted composer and scholar of English folk-song Ralph Vaughan Williams. The book was highly influential as it introduced British choirs and church congregations (who were more accustomed to Victorian hymn tunes) to a form of Christmas music rooted in traditional folk music.

The New Oxford Book of Carols started life as a recording tie-in project with Faber Music, consisting of a limited number of carols. Under the direction of OUP's senior editor Julian Elloway, the project grew beyond its initial concept to a published collection of 201 vocal pieces accompanied by a substantial body of historically informed arranging and editorial commentary. The volume contains two essays, and each carol is accompanied by detailed annotations; this supporting editorial material is considered to be a valuable resource for historians, church musicians, and musicologists.

== See also ==
- List of Christmas carols
