= Hymns and Psalms =

1983 Methodisthymnal

Hymns and Psalms: a Methodist and ecumenical hymn book
- Cover of Hymns and Psalms
- Language: English
- Subject: Religious sheet music/hymnal and Christian liturgy
- Publisher: Methodist Publishing
- Publication date: 1983
- Publication place: United Kingdom
- Media type: Print (hardback)
- ISBN: 9780946550012 (full music edition)
- Website: Hymns and Psalms at Methodist Publishing

Hymns and Psalms was the primary hymnbook of the Methodist Church of Great Britain from 1983 until 2010. The hymnbook was first published by the Methodist Publishing House in 1983, to replace the Methodist Hymn-Book, which was published soon after the unification of the Methodist Church in 1933.

The book's full title is Hymns and Psalms: A Methodist and Ecumenical Hymn Book, reflecting a degree of participation by many Christian denominations in its creation and a desire "to build from accepted denominational traditions towards a richer sharing of ... diverse interests and ... common heritage".

The decision to produce a new hymnbook was taken at the Methodist Conference of 1979, and the new book was authorised for use in all Methodist Churches in the Connexion at the 1982 Conference in Plymouth.

The hymns are presented in three sections, covering, respectively, God's Nature, God's World and God's People, followed by a selection of Psalms and canticles. Of the 823 hymns, over 150 were written by Charles Wesley (1707–88), brother of John Wesley, the founder of Methodism. Isaac Watts also has a significant number of hymns included. The most represented hymn writer of the 20th century is Fred Pratt Green (1903–2000), who has 27 hymns included.

Hymns and Psalms remains an authorised part of the Methodist hymnody and is still in active use within the Methodist Church, although the Methodist Conference Faith and Order Committee has also released a successor hymn book, Singing the Faith, which was approved at the 2010 Methodist Conference and published in 2011.

== See also ==
- List of English-language hymnals by denomination
