= The Oxford Book of Carols =

1928 collection of Anglican carols

- Cover of the 1984 edition
- Editor: Percy Dearmer, Martin Shaw & Ralph Vaughan Williams
- Language: English
- Subject: Sheet Music - Religious
- Publisher: Oxford University Press
- Publication date: 1928
- Publication place: United Kingdom
- Media type: Print (paperback)
- Pages: 480
- ISBN: 9780193533158
- Website: The Oxford Book of Carols on OUP.com

The Oxford Book of Carols is a collection of vocal scores of Christmas carols and carols of other seasons. It was first published in 1928 by Oxford University Press and was edited by Percy Dearmer, Martin Shaw and Ralph Vaughan Williams. It became a widely used source of carols among choirs and church congregations in Britain.

== History ==
Vaughan Williams was a noted composer and arranger of music in the Anglican Church and a founding member of the English Folk Dance and Song Society. He was a scholar of English folk-song and his music was greatly influenced by traditional folk forms. Vaughan Williams had collaborated with Percy Dearmer on the production of the English Hymnal, which was published in 1906, and as with this hymnal, The Oxford Book of Carols favoured traditional folk tunes and polyphonic arrangements of carols, instead of the Victorian hymn tunes that Vaughan Williams considered to be over-sentimental and Germanic in tone. Vaughan Williams in particular drew on music from his own childhood and his scholarship of English folk music, and was driven by his conviction that the music of ordinary people should be valued.

== Editions ==
The Oxford Book of Carols has been reprinted many times. It was re-engraved and reset in a slightly larger format in 1964, at which time some of the medieval carols were re-edited. The most recent impression is dated 26 January 1984 and is still in print.

The New Oxford Book of Carols was published in 1992 by OUP. Anthologists Hugh Keyte and Andrew Parrott make few references to OBC in their Introduction and their aim appears the same as Dearmer's in 1928. The enormous task was shared by both sets of anthologists and Keyte and Parrott issued The Shorter New Oxford Book of Carols in 1993.

== See also ==
- Christmas music
- Carols for Choirs
- List of Christmas Carols
- Nine Lessons and Carols (Carols from King's College, Cambridge)
