= Christadelphian hymnals =

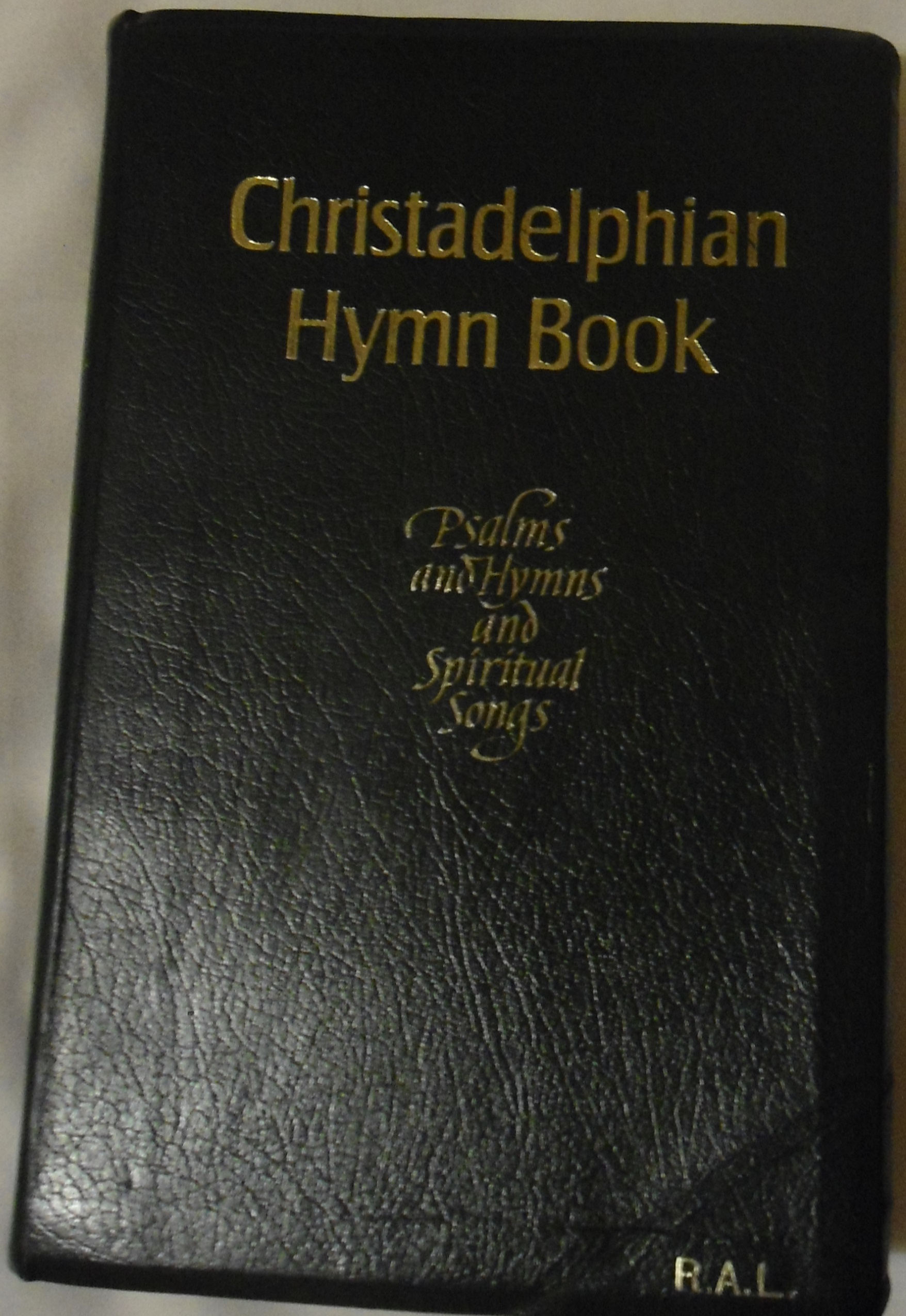
The 2002 English language hymn book

Sing To The Lord book

The earliest Christadelphian hymn book published was the "Sacred Melodist" which was published by Benjamin Wilson in Geneva, Illinois in 1860. The next was the hymn book published for the use of Baptised Believers in the Kingdom of God (an early name for Christadelphians) by George Dowie in Edinburgh in 1864. "The Golden Harp" was put together in 1864 by Scotsman Robert Roberts.

This was then followed a year later by first 'official' (as the Christadelphians had not been named as such until then) book, compiled also by Roberts, and was called simply "The Christadelphian Hymn Book." It contained 223 psalms/hymns and 50 anthems but no music. In 1869 Roberts produced a version of this book with music included.

The first major revision of the official book took place in 1932 under the guidance of Charles Curwen Walker of Birmingham, England, the editor of The Christadelphian magazine. There were 73 new songs added, including some originals. It was further expanded in 1962 by John Carter, also editor of the magazine, and L G Sargent. Its simple monotone front cover with gold writing gave it the nickname "The Black Hymn Book." The last major revision, this time by various members of the denomination, was in 2002. Subtitled Psalms, Hymns and Spiritual Songs the cover colour was changed to green, the number of songs increased to 438 and the hymns and anthems were no longer in separate sections. As most Christadelphians own their own hymn books (i.e. they are not communal) many get their names or initials embossed on them. The 2002 version of the book (commonly called "The Green Book") is also available in E-book format from The Christadelphian publishing office.

Christadelphian hymnody makes considerable use of the hymns of the Anglican and British Protestant traditions (even in US ecclesias the hymnody is typically more British than American). In many Christadelphian hymn books a sizeable proportion of hymns are drawn from the Scottish Psalter and non-Christadelphian hymn-writers including Isaac Watts, Charles Wesley, William Cowper and John Newton. Despite incorporating non-Christadelphian hymns however, Christadelphian hymnody preserves the essential teachings of the community.

== Other works ==
- The Sunday School Union Hymn Book (1897) this book had 137 hymns. Some of the editions used tonic sol-fa notation. This was published in 1897, 1913, and 1936.
- 'Suffolk St' Christadelphian Hymn Book (1903), compiled by CJ Caldicott, J Bland, J Hawkins, HH Horsman, T Turner, W Potter, C Jones (Birmingham). Caldicott was a piano technician and wrote hymns such as We shall be like him. Caldicott made an appeal for original compositions as some of the copyright costs for tunes were upwards of £3 each.
- Christadelphian Youth Hymnal (1952) was compiled by a committee under the editorship of J Carter, some of the original hymns written for this hymnal included LG Sargent's High over lashing waves our God is throned and D Martindale's Angels did sing on Behl'ems hill set to the medieval VULPIUS tune. The major feature of this publication was the addition of counter-melodies/descants by D Crosby, arranged and written specifically for young voices.
- Hymns for Young People (date unknown) was published by the Christadelphian Sunday School Association, South Australia.
- The Joy Book (date unknown), this publication contains youth pieces, including Sing Hosanna. The music is written in lead sheet format.
- Sing to the Lord (1978), this widely-used Sunday School hymnal was published in Birmingham and contains some original works by R Standeven. Both words-with-music, and words-only editions were produced.
- Praise the Lord (1993) this publication, compiled by C Clementson (Hoddesdon), contain a wide range of musical styles including hymns, Taize pieces, Jewish-styled songs, anthems, and modern songs.
- Praise the Lord (2000) the second version of Praise the Lord contained the original 130 songs, plus 70 additional songs. Again, a wide range of music has been compiled, from hymn tunes by Orlando Gibbons (1583-1625), to newly written works by C Miles and other Christadelphian composers.
- Worship (2008), also known as "Worship 1" or "The Purple Book" it first published in 2008, by c.a.t. (under the NCC umbrella) responding to a need within the Christadelphian community for usable original music. The 2nd edition, published in October 2010, has additions and corrections but essentially is the same book from 2008. The 2nd edition also has capo chords for some songs. Worship consists of piano/vocal, SATB, and lead sheet arrangements. Many of the songs have already been recorded in Australia and the UK. A wide range of musical styles are within the book, including contemporary pieces, choral pieces, ballads, hymns, rounds, works from original musicals, and so on. There are additional Worship resources at the c.a.t. site including files for transposing instruments and audio files of most of the Worship songs.
- Worship 2 (2016) commonly called "The Orange Book", contains 133 new pieces consisting of congregational and individual music; hymns, songs, anthems, meditations; all intended for supplementing existing personal and congregational music. Music is presented as piano/vocal scores and choral arrangements to suit different uses and occasions. Some works may suit congregational singing while others will need rehearsing as items for events.
- Praise the Lord 2016 (2016) contains 37 new songs with words and music, as a supplement to the core song book.

While the books mentioned above (or translations thereof) are often used outside the English-speaking world there are a variety of different books in many different languages.
