= ReClaim Hymnal =

Worship book and hymnal used by several Lutheran denominations in North America

- 2006 edition of the ReClaim Hymnal
- Released: 2006
- Publisher: Sola Publishing
← Lutheran Book of Worship	

The ReClaim Hymnal is a worship book and hymnal used by several Lutheran denominations in North America. It was published in 2006 by ReClaim Resources. ReClaim Resources then became part of Sola Publishing, the publishing arm of Word Alone Ministries which serves the Lutheran Congregations in Mission for Christ (LCMC) and the North American Lutheran Church (NALC); currently, Sola Publisher is the sole publisher and distributor of the hymnal. The project comes out of an effort by its authors "to develop an independent worship resource securely grounded in the Lutheran liturgical tradition of worship and singing".

There are two editions: a pew edition, and an accompaniment edition; the accompaniment edition has identical content to that of the pew edition, but with spiral binding. The hymnal include three settings for the Divine Service, an order for Vespers, and other occasional services. There are 275 hymns; the editors decided to include fewer hymns than other hymnals have, so that those who learn church music with the hymnal will build on a solid foundation of classic Lutheran hymns and North American standards. The hymnal's three settings for the Divine Service employ a modern variant of the Common Service, the first ever common liturgy for the Divine Service amongst English-speaking Lutherans in the United States and Canada.
