= Mission Praise =

Anglican and Presbyterian hymnal

Mission Praise is a hymn book used in a wide variety of churches, including the Church of Scotland and the Church of England.

It originated as Mission England Praise, prepared for Billy Graham's 1984 Mission England campaign. In its "words only" form, it was a thin booklet of 282 pieces, with a wide mixture of hymns and worship songs. Some conservative Christians saw it as a way of bringing what they perceived as charismatic choruses into mainstream church worship.

While its language is recognizably modern in many ways, Mission Praise does not use gender-neutral language, in the way that (for example) the Canadian Anglican Common Praise hymnary does.

Mission Praise has been through a number of editions. Each edition has a words only book in both regular and large print and a music book. The second booklet (Mission Praise 2), came out in 1987, and contained songs 283 to 647.

The various editions have owed much to The Jubilate Group for their copyright controlled hymnody.

A new edition Mission Praise Combined was released in 1993; featuring an extra two hundred songs; expanding the collection from 647 to 798 items and renumbering and reindexing all items in approximate alphabetical order.

In 1999, Complete Mission Praise was published, increasing the number of hymns to 1021. The 2005 edition, produced under the Collins imprint, adds a further 123 songs from the last few years. Complete Mission Praise: 25th Anniversary Edition was published in 2009 and added another 106 new songs resulting in 1,250 overall.

The editions subsequent to 1993 maintain the numeric sequence of the songs in the previous editions, resulting in several separate alphabetical sequences of songs in the latest edition.

In January 2008, Mission Praise became the first major hymnbook to be available online. The new website enabled subscribers to access words, sheet music and MIDI files of the songs in Mission Praise and its sister products Carol Praise and Junior Praise. The Mission Praise 30th Anniversary Edition was published on 15 January 2015 with 1,385 hymns and songs. The numbering remains consistent with previous editions. The related full music edition is split into two volumes, with the first volume containing 798 items (the same as the 1993 edition).

== See also ==
- List of English-language hymnals by denomination
