= Baptist Hymnal =

Hymnbook used by the Southern Baptist Convention

The Baptist Hymnal is a book of hymns and songs used for Christian worship in churches affiliated with the United States denomination, the Southern Baptist Convention. There have been four editions, released in 1956, 1975, 1991 and 2008. The 2008 edition is also published under the name The Worship Hymnal.

== History ==
The Baptist Hymn and Praise Book", published in 1904 in Nashville Tennessee, is considered the predecessor to the Southern Baptist Convention's "Baptist Hymnal" series.

The 1956 edition was the first Southern Baptist Convention publication to use the title "Baptist Hymnal".

The 1956, 1975, 1991 and 2008 editions have all been printed by LifeWay Christian Resources, formerly known as the Sunday School Board of the Southern Baptist Convention; however, the 1956 printing names Convention Press as the printer and secured holder of copyright.

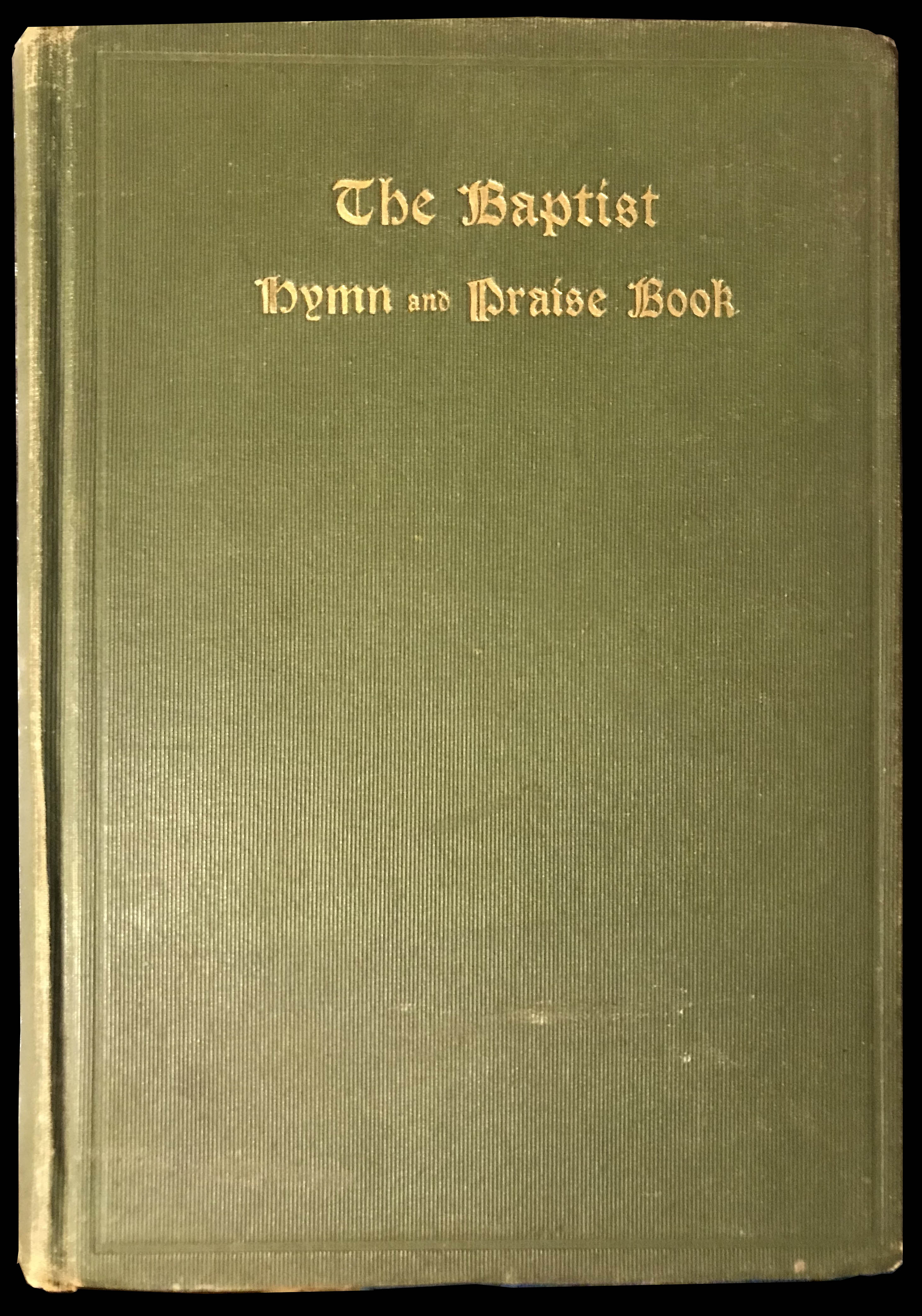
Front cover of the 1904 Baptist Hymn and Praise Book, the first hymnal published by the Sunday School Board of the Southern Baptist Convention.

=== 2008 edition ===
The group working on the 2008 edition was called The Worship Project. In addition to revising the Baptist Hymnal, it produced an online hymn and worship song resource, lifewayworship.com.

At a summit meeting in January 2007, leadership from across Southern Baptist life came together to contribute directly to the overall makeup of the project. Attendees included music professors from Southern Baptist seminaries and 21 Baptist colleges, as well as church musicians, worship leaders, music industry leaders, representatives from the staff that created the 1991 Baptist Hymnal and current LifeWay employees who were devoted to the project. Among other priorities discussed, the summit served as a means to get feedback from music practitioners on criteria for selecting the hymns, worship songs and praise choruses to be included.

In October 2007, a Theology Committee was convened at Southwestern Baptist Theological Seminary for a theological review of songs that will be included in the project. Jon Duncan, state music director of the Georgia Baptist Convention, served as a committee leader.

The project was released in 2008.

== Other Baptist hymnals ==
The American Baptist Publication Society, Philadelphia published a book in 1883 called "The Baptist Hymnal".

Aylesbury Press in Surrey Hills, Sydney, Australia published a book in 1967 called "The Hymnal" but also known as "The Baptist Hymnal".

For information on Baptist hymnals in a more general sense, see this list.

== See also ==
- List of English-language hymnals by denomination
