= Australian Hymn Book =

Ecumenical collection of hymns published in Australia in 1977

- Language: English
- Publication date: 1977

The Australian Hymn Book (ISBN 1-86371-150-3) was first published in 1977, and was the culmination of almost ten years' work by an ecumenical committee, chaired by A. Harold Wood, intent on producing a new, contemporary and inclusive hymn book that could be used in worship by the varied Christian congregations across Australia. The first meetings were held in 1968 amongst representatives of the Anglican (Church of England), Congregational, Methodist and Presbyterian churches. A draft list of hymns was circulated in 1972, and in 1974, after the Roman Catholic Church asked to be included, two versions of the hymn book were eventually published: the Australian Hymn Book (containing 579 items) and the Australian Hymn Book with Catholic Supplement (adding a further 25 items). The new hymn book was taken up widely, especially with the union of the Congregational, the Methodist and most of the Presbyterian parishes that created the Uniting Church in Australia in 1977. In its international edition, the hymn book is known as With One Voice (not to be confused with the 1995 work published by the Evangelical Lutheran Church in America as a supplement to the Lutheran Book of Worship).

The hymn book contains indexes to first lines, tunes, composers, authors, subjects, scripture and the religious calendar. A companion book, Songs of the People of God, by Wesley Milgate, was released in 1982, and contains notes on the sources and history of each tune and hymn text, along with short biographies of all authors and composers.

After a survey conducted in 1990, it was decided that a new edition of the Australian Hymn Book was needed. Together in Song: Australian Hymn Book II was released in 1999. The major changes were the modernisation of the texts (particularly the use of inclusive language), the removal of hymns that had fallen out of use, and the addition of more modern musical settings, worship songs and psalm settings. A companion volume with notes on songs, lyrists and composers compiled by Rev. Dr. H. D'Arcy Wood is also available.

== See also ==
- List of English-language hymnals by denomination
