= Together in Song =

1999 Australian hymn book

Together in Song: Australian Hymn Book II (ISBN 1-86371-762-5) was published in 1999. It is a book of 783 psalms, hymns and spiritual songs for use in Christian worship in Australia and elsewhere. It is a significant revision of The Australian Hymn Book published 22 years earlier.

It was created by an ecumenical editorial committee chaired by Canon Dr. Lawrence Bartlett and containing representatives from the Anglican, Churches of Christ, Lutheran, Presbyterian, Roman Catholic and Uniting churches.

Major changes include modernising the texts (using inclusive language and reducing archaic language), removing hymns that had fallen out of use, emphasising psalms, and adding of more modern musical settings and worship songs. The book also reflects changes agreed by the English Language Liturgical Consultation in 1988.

Canon Dr. Lawrence Bartlett describes the book as "Ecumenical in that it represents the liturgical insights of those churches represented on the Editorial Committee" and "Contemporary in that all the material, whether old or new, is presented so that today's worshippers can use it without embarrassment or confusion."

The collection of hymns is intentionally international with material drawn from 48 countries. The addition of new songs has broadened the range of musical styles represented, spanning from plainsong to worship songs composed at Hillsong. The most represented hymnwriter is Charles Wesley with 41 hymns, while contemporary hymnwriters like Brian Wren has 24 hymns included, John L. Bell has 27 and Shirley Murray has 5. In some circumstances, where the editorial committee could not find a song that adequately fulfilled a need they wrote their own such as Shirley Ludgater's hymn about marriage as an act of creation: "When the light of first creation".

One criticism of the book is that the use of inclusive language (noted by alt. after the author's name) has ruined the flow of many older hymns.

The hymns are divided into sections reflecting theological themes or liturgical uses and are arranged chronologically within each section. The hymn book is available in harmony, melody line (with guitar chords), large print, software and audio CD editions. The harmony version contains multiple indexes of tunes, metres, composers and arrangers, authors and translators, texts based on scripture passages, subjects, the church year, first lines and common titles (but not the guitar chords which appear in the melody edition). The melody edition omits some of these indexes.

In 2017 it was announced that there would be no further printings of the hymnal as the publisher, HarperCollins, decided not to renew licence agreements with copyright holders upon their expiration in 2018.

== See also ==
- List of English-language hymnals by denomination

== Companion to Together in song ==
- Milgate, W. & Wood, H. D. (2006) A companion to Together in song : Australian hymn book II, Sydney : Australian Hymn Book ISBN 0-646-45712-8 containing notes on the sources and history of each tune and hymn text, along with short biographies of all authors and composers.
