= The New Century Hymnal =

The New Century Hymnal is a comprehensive hymnal and worship book published in 1995 for the United Church of Christ. The hymnal contains a wide variety of traditional Christian hymns and worship songs, many contemporary hymns and songs, and a substantial selection of "world music" selections (hymns and worship songs from non-European-American origin), a full lectionary-based Psalter, service music selections, and a selection of liturgies from the UCC Book of Worship (1986). Generally speaking, the hymnal is theologically within the mainline Protestant tradition, with a slant toward liturgical forms.

== History ==
The hymnal project was initiated by action of the UCC General Synod in 1977, only three years after the denomination released its first-ever hymnal as a unified body (the eventually unpopular Hymnal of the United Church of Christ). Prior to that time, congregations used the hymnals from their predecessor traditions: the Pilgrim Hymnal of the Congregational Christian Churches or The Hymnal of the Evangelical and Reformed Church. Because of financial struggles and other issues of greater concern to the denomination, however, work on the project by the denomination's Board for Homeland Ministires (now known as the Local Church Ministries division) did not begin until 1989. The hymnal committee was chaired by James W. Crawford, then pastor of Boston's prestigious Old South Church, and the book was edited by Arthur Clyde.

In addition to the standard UCC edition, the hymnal is available in an "ecumenical" edition (for independent congregations, or those from other denominations) that lacks the United Church of Christ symbol imprint on the cover and some of the liturgical material in the "Orders for Worship" section.

While it is currently the only "official" hymnal of the UCC, some local UCC congregations have officially adopted a variety of other hymnals (including the earlier ones) that are used for reasons outlined below, including the local church's own traditions as well as dissatisfaction with language revisions. The UCC does not exert authority over its member churches on matters of worship and congregational life, so congregations are free to use whatever hymnal they choose. No comprehensive figures are available as to the exact percentage of UCC congregations that use the NCH; however, among congregations that responded to the 2004-05 denomination-wide survey of worship practices, "A majority (58%) use The New Century Hymnal, with 39% using it all or nearly all of the time." (from Worshipping Into God's Future: Summary and Strategies 2005, available at .)

== Theological Guidelines ==
According to "The Making of The New Century Hymnal" by James Crawford and Daniel Johnson, the hymnal committee was guided by the following theological guidelines:

- "The 1995 hymnal of the United Church of Christ enables praise of the One, Sovereign, Triune God, who in infinite mystery is always more than doctrine can describe and whose being calls forth awe, worship, love, faith, and service (Isa. 6:1-8)."
- "We affirm that people of all ages, tongues, races, abilities, and genders are created in the image and likeness of God (Gen. 1:26, 5:1-2; United Church of Christ Statement of Faith)."
- "We testify to God's call to stewardship of the earth; we are not entitled to hoard, waste or destroy what God has made, but we are called to glorify God with the earth's resources."
- "We rejoice in providing a rich variety of metaphors for singing of God and inclusive words for singing of people—words that all people can sing."

== Inclusive Language and The New Century Hymnal ==
The New Century Hymnal is perhaps most famous both in and outside the United Church of Christ for its approach to using "inclusive language". Arthur Clyde, hymnal editor, writes "The New Century Hymnal is not the first hymnal to deal with the issue of inclusive language. It does, however, represent the most even and consistent approach to language of any hymnal yet published. Rather than choosing to present only new hymns in inclusive language, those responsible for the language of this hymnal took the General Synod request for an inclusive hymnal quite literally. Thus hymns of other ages are presented in ways that seek to maintain the theology and beauty of the original but without some of the biases of the time in which they were written."

Clyde identifies a number of approaches and concerns implemented in considering hymn text language, which include:

- Translation: Some hymns that were written in languages other than English were retranslated to avoid the linguistic biases of the older translation.
- Archaic Language: Avoiding "thee", "thine", "thou", "ebenezer", "betide", etc. since such language is no longer commonplace in English and is losing its intelligibility to new generations.
- Gender of God: Seeking to reduce the solely-masculine use of language for God, and/or balancing masculine images with feminine and non-gendered images (A few Trinitarian references to God "The Father" were retained). The United Church of Christ describes the New Century Hymnal as "the only hymnal released by a Christian church that honors in equal measure both male and female images of God."
- Gender of Christ: Retaining masculine language for Jesus when the context is his historical, earthly life, but attempting to avoid masculine language in reference to "the resurrected Jesus, the Christ, who is our Sovereign."
- Sensitivity to the use of the word "Lord": Recognizing that "Lord" implies authority/sovereignty, but also a gender (male), the hymnal retains many references to Jesus as "Lord" (particularly in well-known 'memorized' hymns), removes them from non-English texts where Lord was introduced in translation, and changed language in certain other cases. Furthermore, "Lord" is not employed as a name for God (only Jesus Christ). "The overall result of the entire revision process is that the word 'Lord' appears with less frequency than in many other hymnals".
- Kings, Kingdoms, and Masters: Noting its gendered status, "King" as a reference for God was avoided as much as possible. Similarly, "Master" is not only masculine, but also evokes the oppressive imagery of master-and-slave. In both cases, various alternatives were implemented, including the use of "Sovereign" as implying the same sovereignty metaphor as king. Similarly, in many places the gendered "Kingdom" was avoided by using words such as "realm" or "dominion."
- Militaristic Language: As Clyde writes, "It is certain that some will lament the loss of [the militaristic] metaphors, but others cannot sing language of such strong military tendency in a world where violence abounds." In many cases, the message of struggle, conflict, and fight was retained, but with 'toned-down' militarism. For example, in "For All the Saints", "O may thy soldiers, faithful, true, and bold, fight as the saints who nobly fought of old, and win with them the victor's crown of gold" becomes "Still may your people, faithful, true and bold, live as the saints who nobly fought of old, and share with them a glorious crown of gold."
- Trinitarian Language: "The hymnal committee developed a statement concerning the trinitarian formula: 'Where a hymn is clearly trinitarian, Father, Son, and Holy Spirit language may be used, but we will consult poets, theologians, and others in order to search for new ways of expressing the Triune God within the orthodox parameters.'"
- Gender inclusivity with regard to humanity: Language that does not employ male gender-marked words referring to people has been used throughout.
- Use of the Word "Dark": Recognizing the racial implications of many traditional uses where "dark" was meant as negative, bad, or evil, the hymnal has sought to find different language to indicate the contrast or show the absence of light ("shadows" instead of "darkness", or "drive the storms of doubt away" instead of "drive the dark of doubt away", as examples)
- Language about people's abilities: "If the hymn indicates that one must walk or see in this life to participate in the faith, then a change is warranted. If the hymn indicates that walking or seeing or hearing are things that happen when one is utterly overwhelmed by finding oneself in the presence of God in the hereafter, then a change is not necessary."

The language revisions made necessary by these principles became very controversial upon the hymnal's release. Some congregations, mainly from more liberal backgrounds, found the changes liberating, while other ones, typically of moderate-to-conservative theological or social bent, have refused to adopt the new hymnal because they feel the changes were too "radical". Most often, however, complaints about the changes are not theological, but rather because the updated language is seen as un-poetic or as conflicting against the congregation's stored memory (these complaints are particularly made in relation to Christmas carols and American songs, such as America the Beautiful). Similarly, the printing of this hymnal left stanzas disappearing into the binding (instead of leaving enough margin for a binding), and musical lines of text and notes that are poorly typeset on the page. Finally, the omission of certain bass notes in the melodies seem to place an emphasis on singing only the melody and not the harmony in a particular hymn. The 1995 issues of Prism (the theological journal of the UCC) contain critiques and criticisms of the new hymnal.

== Hymnal Contents ==
- Orders for Worship
  - Service of Word and Sacrament I
  - Service of Word and Sacrament II
  - Service of the Word I
  - Service of the Word II
  - Service of the Word III
  - Order for Baptism
  - Order for Confirmation: Affirmation of Baptism
  - Order for Reception of Members: Affirmation of Baptism
  - Order for Thanksgiving for One Who Has Died
  - Morning Prayer
  - Evening Prayer
- Hymns
  - Hymns of Praise
    - The Holy Trinity
      - God
      - Jesus Christ
      - Holy Spirit
    - Opening of Worship
    - Close of Worship
    - Morning
    - Evening
  - Hymns for the Christian Year
    - Advent
    - Christmas
    - Epiphany
      - Baptism of Jesus
      - Transfiguration
    - Lent
      - Ash Wednesday
      - Palm/Passion Sunday
      - Holy Week
    - Easter
    - Easter Season
      - Ascension
    - Pentecost
      - Trinity Sunday
    - Hymns of the Spirit
    - All Saints Day
    - Reign of Christ
  - Hymns for the Faith and Order of the Church
    - The Church
    - The Bible
    - Ministry, Sacraments, and Rites
      - Holy Baptism
      - Holy Communion
      - Confirmation
      - Commissioning, Ordination, and Installation
      - Marriage
      - Burial and Memorial
    - Anniversaries and Dedications
    - Communion of Saints
    - Christian Unity
    - Faith
    - Seasons
      - Thanksgiving
      - Festival of the Christian Home
      - Changing Seasons
  - Hymns for the Life and Work of the Church
    - Pilgrimage
      - Struggle and Conflict
      - Consecration
      - Nurture
      - Comfort and Assurance
    - Discipleship
    - Prayer
    - Mission
      - Witness
      - Service
      - Healing and Forgiveness
    - Stewardship and Creation
    - Justice and Peace
    - Citizenship
  - Hymns of Christian Hope
    - Eternal Life
    - Realm of God
- Psalms and Canticles
  - Introduction and Psalm Tones
  - Psalms
  - Canticles and Ancient Songs
- Service Music
  - Call to Worship
  - Prayer for Mercy (Trisagion and Kyrie)
  - Song of Praise (Gloria)
  - Scripture Response
  - Alleluia
  - Prayer Response, Meditation
  - Doxology
  - Offertory
  - Invitation to Communion
  - Holy, Holy, Holy (Sanctus, Seraphic Hymn)
  - Memorial Acclamation
  - Lamb of God (Agnus Dei)
  - Blessing, Song of Simeon (Nunc Dimittis)
  - Amens
- Worship Resources
  - Prayers Before Worship
  - Opening Words
  - Invocations
  - Confessions, Words of Assurance
  - Offertory Sentences and Prayers
  - Prayers
  - Prayers for Home Use
  - Prayers of Benediction
  - Litanies
  - Creeds, Affirmations of Faith
- Indexes and Acknowledgements
  - Copyright Acknowledgements
  - Author, Composer, and Source Index
  - Metrical Index
  - Tune Index
  - Scriptural Index
  - Lectionary Index
  - Topical Index
  - First Line Index
  - Descant Index

== See also ==
- List of English-language hymnals by denomination
