= Olney Hymns =

Anglican hymnal; book of hymns published in England in 1779

The Olney Hymns /ˈoʊni/ were first published in February 1779 and are the combined work of curate John Newton (1725–1807) and his poet friend William Cowper (1731–1800). The hymns were written for use in Newton's rural parish, which was made up of relatively poor and uneducated followers. The Olney Hymns are an illustration of the potent ideologies of the Evangelical movement, to which both men belonged, present in many communities in England at the time.

The Olney Hymns were very popular; by 1836, there had been 37 recorded editions, and it is likely that many other editions were printed in both Britain and America. As hymn-singing gained popularity in the nineteenth century, many (around 25) of the hymns were reproduced in other hymn-books and pamphlets. Today, around six of the original 348 Olney Hymns regularly feature in modern church worship, the most famous of which is "Amazing Grace". Other well-known hymns include Glorious Things of Thee Are Spoken and How sweet the name of Jesus sounds. "Amazing Grace" as it is popularly known was first set to the tune "New Britain" by William Walker in The Southern Harmony and Musical Companion in 1835.

== Background of the town ==
The English town from which the hymns get their name, Olney in Buckinghamshire, was, at the time of first publication, a market town of about 2,000 people. Around 1,200 of these were employed in its lace-making industry. This was generally poorly paid, and Cowper is said to have described his neighbours as "the half-starved and ragged of the earth". The Olney Hymns were written primarily with these poor and under-educated people in mind.

Olney is situated near the borders of Buckinghamshire, Bedfordshire, and Northamptonshire – an area traditionally associated with religious Dissent. Dissenters were Protestants who refused to follow the rules of the Church of England after the Restoration of Charles II in 1660, and when Newton settled in Olney the town still supported two Dissenting chapels. Notable local Dissenters included John Bunyan, from Bedford, author of the Pilgrim's Progress, and another important hymn writer, Philip Doddridge (1702–51), from Northampton. Newton's own associations with Dissenters (his mother was one) meant he was in a position to conciliate with, rather than confront, his parishioners, and he quickly achieved a reputation as a popular preacher. Within his first year at Olney a gallery was added to the church to increase its congregational capacity, and the weekly prayer-meetings were moved in 1769 to Lord Dartmouth's mansion, the Great House, to accommodate even greater numbers. Jesus where'er thy people meet was written for their first meeting at the Great House.

== Newton's and Cowper's personal backgrounds ==
John Newton was an only child, and was a self-educated sea captain, at one time captaining slave ships. Newton's conversion occurred during a violent storm at sea on 10 March 1748. He describes the event in his autobiography, An Authentic Narrative (published 1764), and thereafter marked the anniversary of his conversion as a day of thanksgiving. This incident revived Newton's belief in God, and despite considerable reservations from within the established church (it took him six years to be ordained into the Church of England), he achieved the position of priest in Olney in 1764. Newton's apparent influence and charisma proved beneficial to him and his parish when local Evangelical merchant, John Thornton, to whom he had sent a copy of his autobiography, offered the parish £200 per year, requesting that Newton, in part, provided for the poor. This annual contribution ceased when Newton left in 1780 to take the position of Rector at St. Mary Woolnoth in London. Newton's epitaph on a plaque in St. Mary Woolnoth, written by Newton himself, bears these words:

JOHN NEWTON, Clerk
Once an infidel and libertine
A servant of slaves in Africa,
Was, by the rich mercy of our Lord and Saviour
JESUS CHRIST,
restored, pardoned, and appointed to preach
the Gospel which he had long laboured to destroy.
He ministered,
Near sixteen years in Olney, in Bucks,
And twenty-eight years in this Church.

William Cowper was the son of an Anglican clergyman, and well-educated at Westminster School. Cowper was liable to bouts of severe depression throughout his adult life, and during a period in an asylum he was counselled by his cousin, Martin Madan, an Evangelical clergyman. His new enthusiasm for Evangelicalism, his conversion, and his move to Olney in 1767 brought him into contact with John Newton. Cowper eventually became an unpaid curate at Newton's church, helping with the distribution of Thornton's funds.

Cowper is best known not just for his contribution to the Olney Hymns, but as a poet, letter-writer, and translator: his works include The Diverting History of John Gilpin (1782), The Task (1785) and his translation of the works of Homer, published in 1791. Cowper left Olney for nearby Weston Underwood in 1786.

== The hymns in more detail ==
The Olney Hymns are in part an expression of Newton's and Cowper's personal religious faith and experience, and a reflection of the principal tenets of the Evangelical faith: the inherent sinfulness of man; religious conversion; atonement; activism; devotion to the Bible; God's providence; and the belief in an eternal life after death. However, the hymns were primarily written for immediate and day-to-day use in Newton's ministry at Olney. Here they were sung, or chanted, in church or at Newton's other Sunday and weekday meetings as a collective expression of worship. Hymn singing, though, was not without controversy, particularly within the Established church, the Church of England. By the 1760s hymns had become an established feature of religious devotion in the Evangelical church, where early (post-Reformation) hymns were versifications (song-like verses adapted from the original words) of the biblical text of the psalms, known as metrical psalms. In the Church of England, hymns other than metrical psalms were of questionable legality until the 1820s, as they were not explicitly sanctioned by the Book of Common Prayer. As a consequence, many church leaders reserved hymn-singing for meetings other than the main Sunday services, and for private or household devotions.

In the preface to the Hymns Newton says: "They should be Hymns, not Odes, if designed for public worship, and for the use of plain people". Newton also explains his two primary motives for publishing: his desire to promote "the faith and comfort of sincere Christians", and as a permanent record of his friendship with Cowper. Newton is attributed with suggesting that he and Cowper collaborate on a collection of hymns, ultimately drawn largely from Newton's texts accumulated over some 10 years (by the time of publication). Of the 348 hymns in the original published edition of 1779, some commentaries state that Cowper wrote just 66 between 1772 and 1773, and Newton the remainder, while other sources attribute 67 to Cowper. It is known, however, that Newton wrote some of the hymns in direct response to events around him: Oh for a closer walk with God for instance was written by Cowper in response to the serious illness then being suffered by his house companion, Mary Unwin, an illness she survived.

There is no evidence to show that either Newton or Cowper wrote any music to accompany the hymns. It is assumed that they were initially sung to any suitable tune that fitted the metre (rhythm), most probably to 16th or 17th century metrical psalm tunes. Subsequently, individual tunes have become linked to specific hymns from the Olney books. For example, the tune Austria (originally Haydn's "Gott erhalte Franz den Kaiser", an Austrian patriotic anthem) is associated today with the hymn Glorious Things of Thee Are Spoken, just as New Britain, an American folk melody believed to be Scottish or Irish in origin, has since the 1830s been associated with Amazing Grace. This hymn's Scottish or Irish melody is pentatonic and suggests a bagpipe tune; the hymn is frequently performed on bagpipes and has become associated with that instrument.

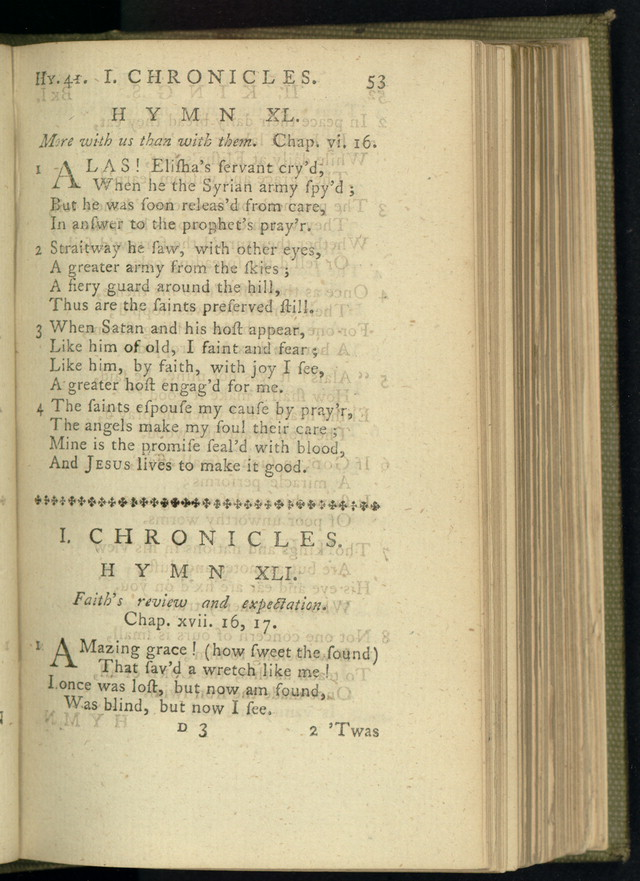
Amazing Grace

As an expression of the many Evangelical beliefs, Amazing Grace serves as an example: The first stanza (verse), for instance, expresses Newton's sense of past sinfulness, as a "wretch", but also conversion, from being "lost" and "blind" to "now I see". God's providence, and Cowper's sense of a close and personal relationship with God are voiced in stanza four: "He will my shield and portion be". The belief in eternal life after death is expressed in stanzas five and six: "when this flesh and heart shall fail", "I shall possess" "A life of joy and peace", and "God, who call'd me here below, Will be for ever mine".

"Amazing Grace" was not the original title of this hymn: It was originally written as a poem entitled "Faith's Review and Expectation" and appears as Hymn 41 in Book I of the Olney Hymns with that title. The six stanza version quoted is the original, as written by Newton, but it has also appeared in longer forms where others have added verses or where verses from other hymns from the Olney books have been moved across.

The Olney Hymns are subdivided into three books: Book I, On Select Texts of Scripture; Book II, On occasional Subjects; and, Book III, On the Progress and Changes of the Spiritual Life. The sub-divisions reflect key Evangelical beliefs. Book I holds that the Bible is the ultimate source of religious authority, and its hymns are written to provide the believer, through simple language, with a thorough understanding of its contents. Book II's "Occasional Subjects" are those that bring understanding to the priorities of the Evangelical spiritual life. There is a section for instance on "Providences", which serves to illustrate the Evangelical belief in God's ever-present controlling hand. Book III is written to express Newton's ideas of the stages of personal spiritual awakening and salvation.

The undoubted popularity of the hymns was not simply a matter of local taste, but can be seen within the wider, developing religious climate in England. The relative rise in popularity of the Evangelical movement in the late 18th and early 19th centuries was due to a number of reasons: the onset of the Industrial Revolution and the subsequent break-up of, particularly, rural communities, was an unsettling influence on a parish like Olney; Methodism had seen a significant growth in popularity in the same period; and Evangelicalism was gradually finding its way into the established Church of England. However, Newton's and Cowper's writing clearly fitted its purpose. Cowper's relatively few hymns demonstrate his poetic and creative abilities, whereas Newton's prose have been assessed by some as "wooden". Nevertheless, the principal purpose of the hymns was not a theological discussion or representation of the Bible; rather, they were written for "plain people". Newton's use of simple and repetitive metres (rhythms) and simple rhyming structures helped his congregation remember the words. The significant emphasis on 'I' within the hymns shows Newton's view that the hymns are a product of his personal experience, a feature of his belief in personal repentance and conversion, and his desire for a personal relationship with God.

== See also ==
- List of English-language hymnals by denomination
