= God Moves in a Mysterious Way =

Christian hymn, written in 1773 by William Cowper from England

- Hymn
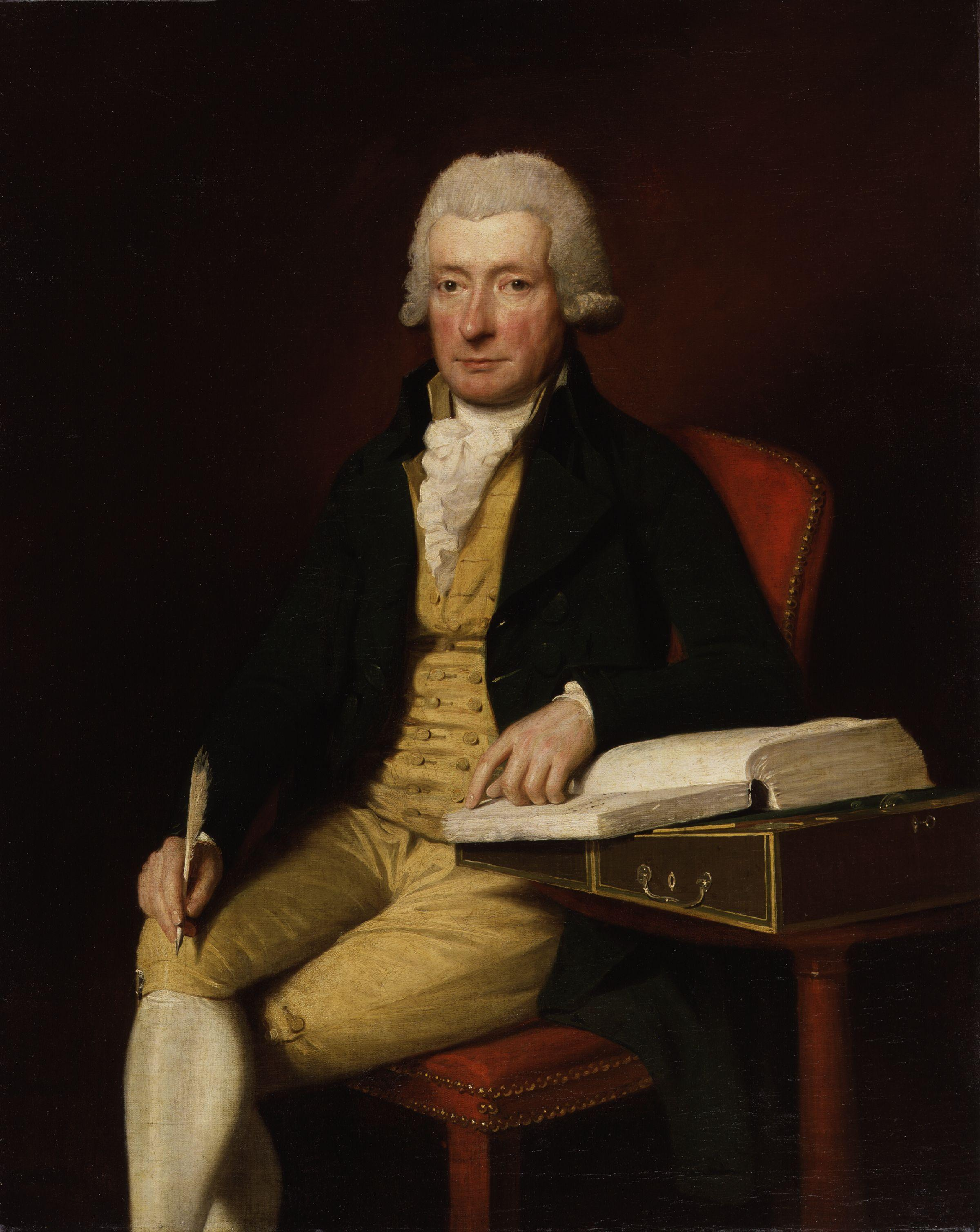
- William Cowper, author of the hymn text
- Full title: Conflict: Light Shining out of Darkness
- Text: by William Cowper
- Meter: 8.6.8.6 (CM)
- Melody: London New (The Psalmes of David in Prose and Meeter); Dundee
- Published: 1774
- 365 in NEH; 445 in Common Praise; 373 in HAM; 677 in The Hymnal 1982; 434 in PsH; 128 in Trinity Hymnal; 73 in BH; 412 in NCH; 483 in LBW; 765 in LSB; 546 in LW; 65 in WR

"God Moves in a Mysterious Way" is a Christian hymn, written in 1773 by the 18th-century English poet William Cowper. It was written by Cowper in 1773 as a poem entitled "Light Shining out of Darkness".

The poem was the last hymn text that Cowper wrote. It was written following his attempted suicide while living at Olney in Buckinghamshire. John Newton published the poem the next year in his Twenty-six Letters on Religious Subjects; to which are added Hymns (1774).

== Words ==
The words were composed by William Cowper (1731–1800). Constituting six verses, they were written in 1773, just before the onset of a depressive illness, during which Cowper attempted suicide by drowning. The text was first published by Cowper's friend, John Newton, in his Twenty-six Letters on Religious Subjects; to which are added Hymns in 1774. The hymn was later published in Olney Hymns which Cowper co-wrote with Newton. Entitled Conflict: Light Shining out of Darkness, it was accompanied by a text from Saint John's Gospel, Chapter 13: Verse 7, which quotes Jesus saying to his disciples; "What I do thou knowest not now; but thou shalt know hereafter."

God moves in a mysterious way,
His wonders to perform;
He plants his footsteps in the sea,
And rides upon the storm.

Deep in unfathomable mines
Of never failing skill;
He treasures up his bright designs,
And works His sovereign will.

Ye fearful saints fresh courage take,
The clouds ye so much dread
Are big with mercy, and shall break
In blessings on your head.

Judge not the Lord by feeble sense,
But trust him for his grace;
Behind a frowning providence,
He hides a smiling face.

His purposes will ripen fast,
Unfolding ev'ry hour;
The bud may have a bitter taste,
But sweet will be the flow'r.

Blind unbelief is sure to err,
And scan his work in vain;
God is his own interpreter,
And he will make it plain.

The first line of the hymn has become a proverb in modern times, usually phrased as "God moves in mysterious ways" or "the Lord moves in mysterious ways."

== Music ==
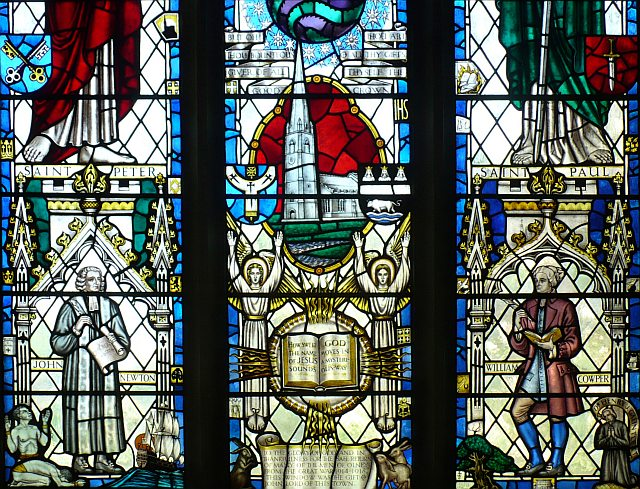
Olney Parish Church, stained-glass window, with words from God Moves in a Mysterious Way

The hymn tune London New comes from The Psalmes of David in Prose and Meeter of 1635. In Common Praise, it is in D major.

A popular alternative and rather similar tune is Dundee, which comes from the Scottish Psalter of 1615; the harmony was arranged by Thomas Ravenscroft (1592–1635) in 1621.

Other traditional tunes include:

- Manoah, first published by Henry Wellington Greatorex in Boston, Massachusetts in 1843 but sometimes attributed to Joseph Haydn, and Irish by Charles Wesley, first published in 1749.
- St. Anne, by Chapel Royal composer William Croft (1708)
- Union, from Select Number of Plain Tunes, by Andrew Law (1781).

Much of the hymn became the lyrics of the theme song for the award-winning 2017 Danish television series Ride upon the Storm.

== Inclusion in other works ==
- Variation (4) on Old Psalm Tunes, Book 1, George Dyson
- Saint Nicolas by Benjamin Britten (1948 cantata) – the final movement IX, The Death of Nicolas
- Joy Beyond the Sorrow: Indelible Grace VI, a 2012 album by Nashville, Tennessee based artist collective, Indelible Grace
- "Pity and Shame", a short story by Ursula K. Le Guin published in Tin House, June 7, 2018. https://tinhouse.com/pity-and-shame/
