= John Gilpin =

Subject of a 1782 comic ballad by William Cowper

John Gilipn
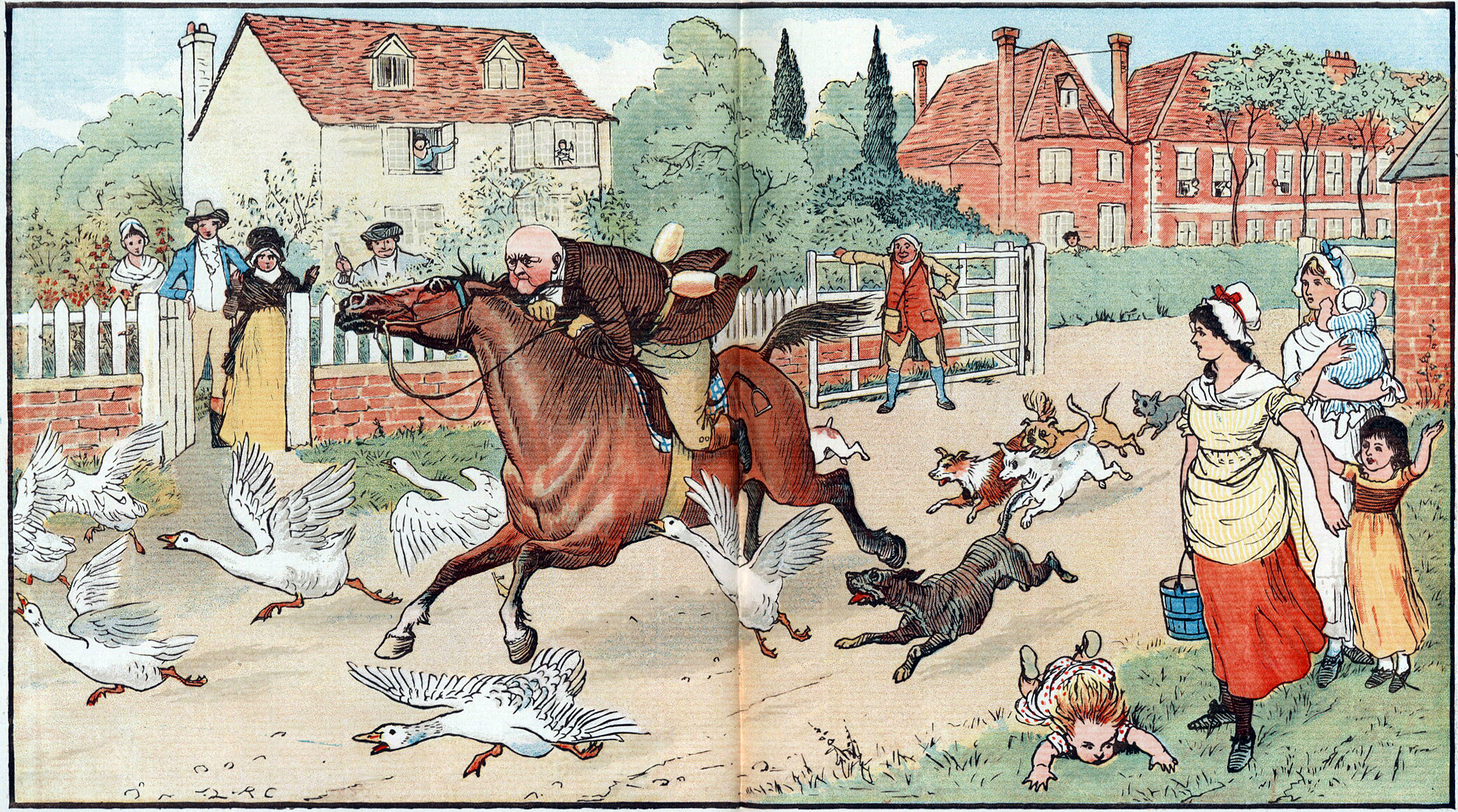
- Illustration by Randolph Caldecott for The Diverting History of John Gilpin
- First appearance: The Diverting History of John Gilpin; 1782
- Created by: William Cowper
- Based on: Mr Beyer, a London linen draper

In-universe information
- Origin: London
- Nationality: British

John Gilpin was featured as the subject in a well-known comic ballad of 1782 by William Cowper, entitled The Diverting History of John Gilpin. Cowper had heard the story from his friend Lady Austen.

Gilpin was said to be a wealthy draper from Cheapside in London, who owned land at Olney, Buckinghamshire, near where Cowper lived. It is likely that he was a Mr Beyer, a linen draper of the Cheapside corner of Paternoster Row. The poem tells how Gilpin and his wife and children became separated during a journey to the Bell Inn, Edmonton, after Gilpin loses control of his horse which bolts and carries him ten miles further to the town of Ware.

A number of sites commemorate the exploits of John Gilpin, most notably Gilpin's Gallop, a street in the village of Stanstead St Margarets. This was said to have been on the original route taken by the horse and his unfortunate rider.

John Gilpin's Ghost was a ballad (1795) by John Thelwall. The John Gilpin clipper of 1852 was also named after him. A former public house in Cambridge was named John Gilpin. A sculpture by Angela Godfrey, which was inspired by Cowper's poem about Gilpin now sits in Fore Street, Edmonton, London.

Cultural depictions of John Gilpin

Illustration for Pictures from English literature Frederick Wentworth (1870)

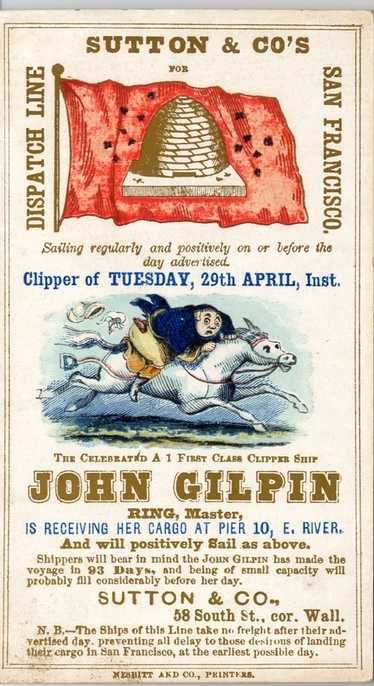
John Gilpin clipper ship card

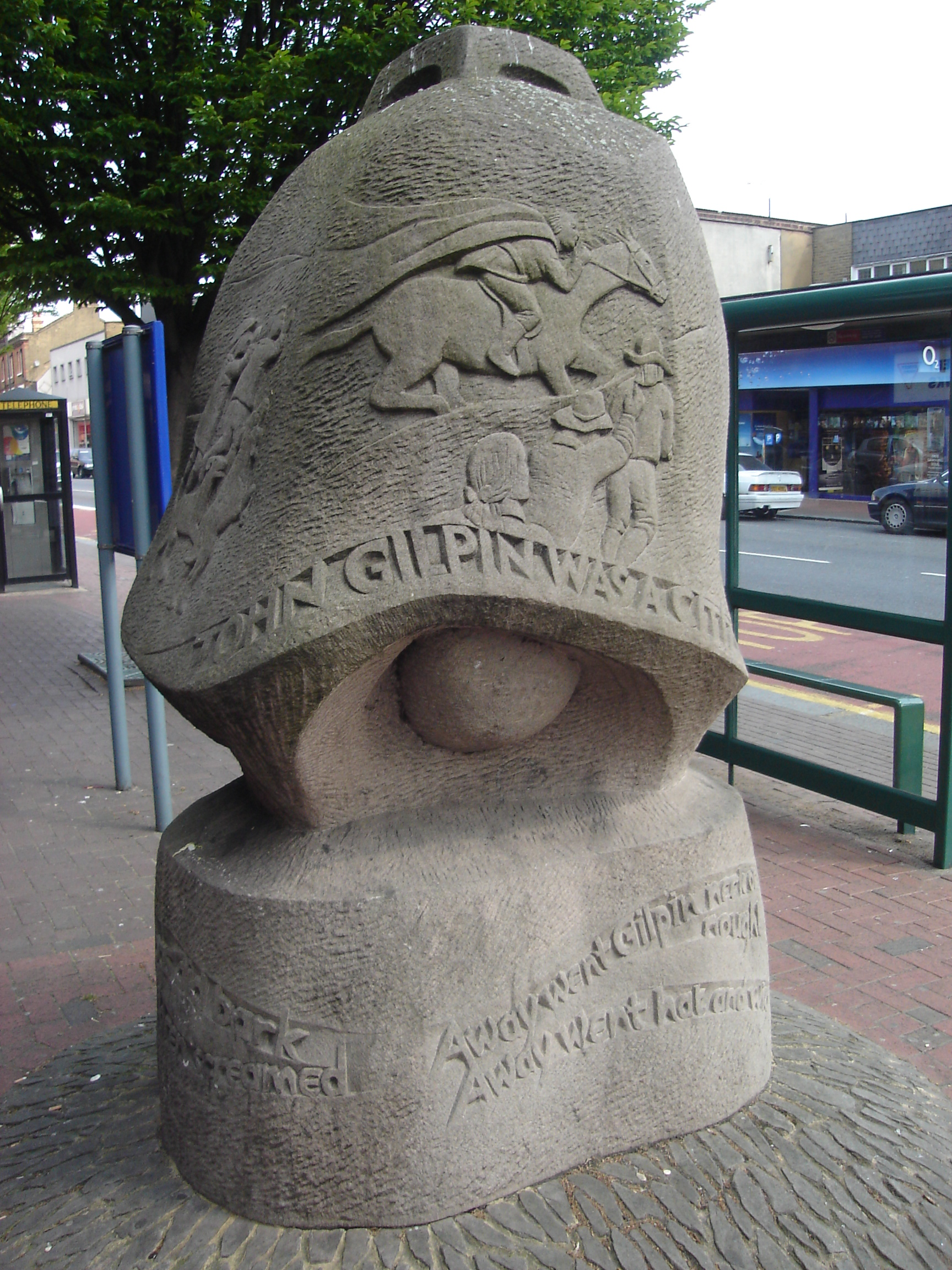
Gilpin's Bell, a sculpture by Angela Godfrey in Fore Street, Edmonton
