= How sweet the name of Jesus sounds =

Christian hymn by John Newton

"How Sweet the Name of Jesus Sounds" is a hymn by the evangelical Anglican cleric John Newton. It was published in Olney Hymns in 1779. Of a metaphorical nature, it focuses on the power of the name of Jesus. It is often sung to the tune of Saint Peter by Alexander Reinagle and less frequently to Ortonville by Thomas Hastings. A modern alternative tune is Rachel by Chris Bowater.

== Text ==
1 How sweet the name of Jesus sounds
in a believer's ear!
It soothes his sorrow, heals his wounds,
and drives away his fear.

2 It makes the wounded spirit whole
and calms the troubled breast;
'tis manna to the hungry soul,
and to the weary, rest.

3 Dear Name! the Rock on which I build;
my shield and hiding-place;
My never-failing treasury, fill'd
with boundless stores of grace,

4 By Thee my prayers acceptance gain,
although with sin defil'd;
Satan accuses me in vain,
and I am own'd a child.

5 Jesus, my Shepherd, Husband, Friend,
my Prophet, Priest, and King,
my Lord, my Life, my Way, my End,
accept the praise I bring.

6 Weak is the effort of my heart,
and cold my warmest thought;
but when I see Thee as Thou art,
I'll praise Thee as I ought,

7 Till then I would Thy love proclaim
with every fleeting breath;
and may the music of Thy name
refresh my soul in death.
