= John Gilpin (clipper) =

1852 clipper

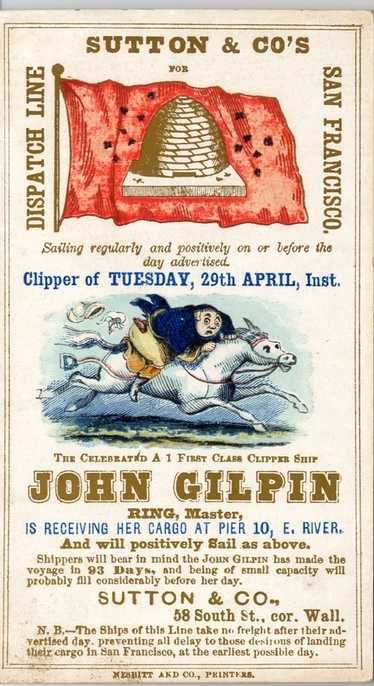

History

United States
- Name: John Gilpin
- Owner: Pierce & Hunnewell, Boston
- Builder: Samuel Hall, East Boston
- Launched: September 1852
- Fate: Collided with iceberg 29 January 1858; Abandoned 30 January 1858
- Notes: Designed by Samuel Hall

General characteristics
- Class & type: Extreme clipper
- Tonnage: 1084 tons; 1089 tons OM
- Length: 195 ft.; 205 ft. LOA
- Beam: 37 ft.
- Draft: 22 ft.
- Notes: 2 decks

John Gilpin was an 1852 clipper in the California trade, named after the literary character John Gilpin. The ship was known for its 1852 race against the clipper Flying Fish, and for its collision with an iceberg.

== Voyages ==
- New York to San Francisco, Captain Ring, 114 days, 1854–55
- New York to San Francisco, 133 days, 1855
- Manila to New York, 111 days, 88 days from Anjer, 1855
- New York to San Francisco, 139 days, 1856
- Honolulu to New Bedford, carrying a cargo of whale oil, 117 days, 1857
- Boston to Honolulu, Captain John F. Ropes, 116 days, 1857

== Race with Flying Fish, Wild Pigeon, and Trade Wind ==
John Gilpin set sail from New York City on October 29, 1852, arriving in San Francisco in 93 days, 20 hours, under the command of Captain Justine Doane. The best day's run during this voyage was 315 miles. Flying Fish, which left New York November 1, narrowly bested John Gilpin, arriving in 92 days, 4 hours.

Clark describes the race between the two leaders, Flying Fish and John Gilpin, as follows:

The fleet was so large in 1853 that it was not uncommon for two or three ships to be in company at sea, each striving to outsail the others. As we have seen, the Flying Fish won the race this year, and from one of the finest fleets of clippers that ever sailed from New York. The match between her and the John Gilpin was exceedingly close, and taken altogether was one of the best ever sailed upon this famous ocean course, the Derby of the sea. It was Samuel Hall against Donald McKay, Justin Doane against Edward Nickels, and all against the fleet. The John Gilpin sailed out past Sandy Hook, October 29, 1852, followed by the Flying Fish on November 1st, and before the green Highlands of Neversink had disappeared below the horizon both ships were under a cloud of canvas. The Flying Fish fanned along through the doldrums and crossed the equator 21 days from Sandy Hook, leading the John Gilpin by one day. From the line to 50° S., the John Gilpin made the run in 23 days, passing the Flying Fish and getting a clear lead of two days. The Flying Fish did some fine sailing here; dashing through the Straits of Le Maire, she came up alongside the John Gilpin just off the Horn, and Nickels, ever famous for his jovial good cheer, invited Doane to come aboard and dine with him, " which invitation," the John Gilpin's log-book ruefully records, " I was reluctantly obliged to decline." This is perhaps the only instance of an invitation to dine out being received off Cape Horn. Few men have had the opportunity to extend such unique hospitality and certainly none could do so more heartily and gracefully than the famous commander of the Flying Fish. His vessel made the run from 50° S. in the Atlantic to 50° S. in the Pacific in 7 days, leading her rival by two days. From this point to the equator, the Flying Fish was 19 and the John Gilpin 20 days. From here the John Gilpin showed remarkable speed, making the run to San Francisco in 15 days, a total of 93 days, closely followed by the Flying Fish, 92 days from Sandy Hook. Their abstract logs are as follows:

Sandy Hook to the equator: Flying Fish 21 days, John Gilpin 24 days
Equator to 50° S: Flying Fish 27 days, John Gilpin 23 days
50° in the Atlantic to 50° S. in Pacific: Flying Fish 7 days, John Gilpin 11 days
To the equator: Flying Fish 19 days, John Gilpin 20 days
Equator to San Francisco: Flying Fish 18 days, John Gilpin 15 days
Total: Flying Fish 92 days, John Gilpin 93 days

When we reflect that this match was sailed over a course of some 15,000 miles, and that the difference of time was only twenty-four hours, one is impressed with the perfection to which the models of the vessels had been brought, as well as the exactness of the data relating to the winds and currents that had been gathered and reduced to a system by Maury, and with the skill of their captains, who were guided by his charts and sailing directions. The average difference of sailing between these two ships was less than six seconds per mile over the entire distance. Few races over thirty-mile courses have been sailed by yachts more evenly matched.

Another contemporary account describes the strategies of the other two vessels in the race, the clippers Wild Pigeon and Trade Wind, and the impact of using Maury's Wind and Current Charts and Sailing Directions, which shortened the voyage between New York and California by 35 days, on average.

All sailed from New York in the autumn of 1852. The Wild Pigeon, October 12th, the John Gilpin, October 29th, the Flying Fish, November 1st, and the Trade Wind, November 14th. It was the season for the best passages. Each one was provided with [Maury’s] Wind and Current Charts. Each one had evidently studied them attentively; and each one was resolved to make the most of them and do his best. All ran against time; but the John Gilpin and the Flying Fish for the whole course, and the Wild Pigeon for part of it, ran neck and neck, the one against the other, and each against all. It was a sweepstakes with these ships, around Cape Horn and through both hemispheres.

Evidently the Fish was most confident that she had the heels of her competitors—she felt her strength and rejoiced in it; she was most anxious for a quick run, and eager withal for a trial. She dashed down southwardly from Sandy Hook, looking occasionally at the charts; but feeling proud in her sweep of wing, and trusting confidently in the judgment of her master, she kept, on the average, 200 miles to leeward of the right track. Rejoicing in her many noble and fine qualities, she crowded on her canvas to its utmost stretch, trusting quite as much to her heels as to the charts, and performed the extraordinary feat of crossing, the sixteenth day out from New York, the parallel of 5 degrees north.

The next day she was well south of 4 degrees north, and in the doldrums, longitude 34 degrees west.

Now her heels became paralyzed, her fortune seems to have deserted her awhile —at least her master, as the winds failed him, feared so; they gave him his motive power—they were fickle, and he was helplessly baffled by them. The bugbear of a northwest current off Cape St. Roque began to loom up in his imagination, and to look alarming; then the dread of falling to leeward came upon him. Chances and luck seemed to conspire against him, and the mere possibility of finding his ship backstrapped filled the mind of Nickels with evil forebodings, and shook his faith in his guide. He doubted the charts, and committed the mistake of the passage.

The Sailing Directions had cautioned the navigator again and again not to attempt to fan along to the eastward in the equatorial doldrums; for by so doing he would himself engage in a fruitless strife with baffling airs, sometimes reinforced in their weakness by westerly currents. But the winds had failed; and so, too, the smart captain of the Flying Fish evidently thought had the Sailing Directions. The Sailing Directions advise the navigator to cross the calm belt in as straight a line as the winds will allow, not fearing the land about Cape St. Roque, or the current that is supposed to sweep round it.

Nickels, forgetting that the charts are founded on the experience of great numbers, being tempted, turned a deaf ear to the caution, and flung away three whole days and more of most precious time dallying in the doldrums. He spent two days about the parallel of 3 degrees north, and his ship left the doldrums, after this waste of time, nearly upon the same meridian at which she entered them.

She was still in 34 degrees, the current keeping her back just as fast as she could fan east. After so great a loss, her very clever master became sensible of his error. Leaving the spell-bound calms behind him where he had undergone such great trials, he wrote in his log as follows: " I now regret that, after making so fine a run to 5 degrees north, I did not dash on and work my way to windward to the northward of St. Roque, as I have experienced little or no westerly set since passing the equator, whilst three or four days have been lost in working to the eastward between the parallels of 5 and 3 degrees north against a strong westerly set"—and, he might have added, with little or no wind. In three days after this he was clear of St. Roque. Just five days before him, the Hazard had passed exactly in the same place, and gained two days on tho Fish by cutting straight across the doldrums, as the Sailing Directions advised him to do.

The Wild Pigeon arrived first off Cape Horn; but here she met with a westerly gale which detained her ten days, while her competitors, the Fish and the Gilpin, were coming up fast with fine winds and flowing sheets. The three swung round tho Horn together, as if entering on the quarter stretch.

On the 30th of December, the three ships crossed the parallel of 35 degrees south, (in the Pacific), tho first recognizing the Pigeon; the Pigeon saw only "a clipper ship"— for she could not conceive how the ship in sight could possibly be the Flying Fish, as that vessel was not to leave New York for some three weeks after she did. The Gilpin was only 30 or 40 miles off at the same time.

Tho race was now wing and wing, and had become exciting. With fair winds and an open sea, the competitors had now a clear stretch to the equator of 2,500 miles before them.

The Flying Fish led the way, the Wild Pigeon pressing her hard, and both dropping the Gilpin quite rapidly, who was edging off to the westward. The two foremost reached the equator on the 13th of January, the Fish leading just 25 miles in latitude, and crossing in 112 deg. 17 min., the Pigeon 40 miles further to the east.

The Gilpin crossed the equator two days afterwards in 116 degrees, and made the glorious run of 15 days thence to the Pilot Grounds off San Francisco.

The Flying Fish beat. She made the passage in 92 days and 4 hours from port to anchor. The Gilpin in 93 days and 20 hours from port to pilot. The Wild Pigeon had 118. The Trade Wind followed with 102 days, having taken fire and burned for eight hours on the way.

The result of this race may be taken as an illustration as to how well navigators are now brought to understand the winds and currents of the sea. Here are three ships, sailing on different days, bound over a trackless waste of ocean for some 15,000 miles or more, and depending alone on the fickle winds of heaven ...; yet, like travelers on the land bound upon the same journey, they pass and repass, fall in with and recognize each other by the way; and what perhaps is still more remarkable is the fact that these ships should each, throughout that great distance, and under the wonderful vicissitudes of climates, winds, and currents which they encountered, have been so skillfully navigated that ... I do not find a single occasion on which they could have been better handled, except in the single instance of the Flying Fish while crossing the doldrums in the Atlantic. And this mistake her own master was prompt to discover and quick to correct.

== Collision with iceberg on final voyage ==
On November 30, 1857, John Gilpin left Honolulu, Hawaii, with 15 passengers aboard, bound for New Bedford, Massachusetts, carrying a cargo of 7500 barrels of whale oil.

During the voyage, on January 29, 1858, about 150 nautical miles (280 kilometres) off the Falkland Islands, John Gilpin struck the underwater portion of an iceberg and began taking on water. One day later, the ship was abandoned. John Gilpin was a total loss, having accidentally caught fire with 15 feet (4.6 meters) of water in her hold.

The British ship Hertfordshire, which was en route from Callao, Peru, to Cork, Ireland, picked up the crew and took them to Bahia, Brazil. On April 14, 1858, some of the crew members arrived in New York City aboard the clipper Sunny South.
