= Harriett Hesketh =

English letter writer (1733–1807)

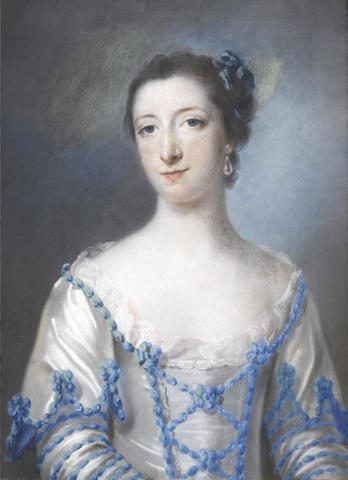
- by Francis Coates
- Born: 1733
- Died: 5 January 1807 (aged 73–74); Clifton

Harriett or Harriet Hesketh or Harriett Cowper (1733 – 5 January 1807) was an English letter writer, known for her long correspondence with William Cowper, which was the basis for his biography.

== Life ==
Harriett Cowper was baptised in Hertingfordbury, Herefordshire on 12 July 1733. She was one of three daughters of Ashley Cowper, clerk of parliament.

Harriett married Thomas Hesketh (1726–1778) of Rufford Hall in Lancashire circa 1754. Sir Thomas died in 1778, leaving his wife well-provided.

She was a cousin of the poet William Cowper who had an unhappy romance with her sister Theodora. William was a frequent visitor at Southampton Row, where Harriett lived as a child, and they had a long correspondence. There was a 19-year gap in their letters, beginning in 1766, during which it was Harriett's insistence they did not communicate. Harriett eventually broke the silence with a letter of congratulation to Cowper when his second book of poetry was published. Harriett supported Cowper financially, and moved into his house and nursed him in his final years of illness. The correspondence between Cowper and Harriett was the basis for Cowper's biography.

After Cowper's death in 1800, Hesketh corresponded for the rest of her life with his cousin Dr John Johnson, with whom he had spent his final years.

Hesketh had several years of declining health towards the end of her life, and spent her time in Weymouth, Bath and Bristol. She died in Clifton in Bristol in 1807. She had no children, and was buried in Bristol Cathedral.
