= The Negro's Complaint =

1788 poem by William Cowper

"The Negro's Complaint" is a poem by William Cowper, which talks about slavery from the perspective of the slave. It was written in 1788, and was intended to be sung to the tune of a popular ballad, "Admiral Hosier's Ghost".

== Text ==
"The Negro's Complaint" (1788)

Forc'd from home, and all its pleasures,
Afric's coast I left forlorn;
To increase a stranger's treasures,
O'er the raging billows borne.
Men from England bought and sold me,
Paid my price in paltry gold;
But, though theirs they have enroll'd me,
Minds are never to be sold.

Still in thought as free as ever,
What are England's rights, I ask,
Me from my delights to sever,
Me to torture, me to task?
Fleecy locks, and black complexion
Cannot forfeit nature's claim;
Skins may differ, but affection
Dwells in white and black the same.

Why did all creating Nature
Make the plant for which we toil?
Sighs must fan it, tears must water,
Sweat of ours must dress the soil.
Think, ye masters, iron-hearted,
Lolling at your jovial boards;
Think how many backs have smarted
For the sweets your cane affords.

Is there, as ye sometimes tell us,
Is there one who reigns on high?
Has he bid you buy and sell us,
Speaking from his throne the sky?
Ask him, if your knotted scourges,
Matches, blood-extorting screws,
Are the means that duty urges
Agents of his will to use?

Hark! He answers!—Wild tornadoes,
Strewing yonder sea with wrecks;
Wasting towns, plantations, meadows,
Are the voice with which he speaks.
He, foreseeing what vexations
Afric's sons should undergo,
Fix'd their tyrants' habitations
Where his whirlwinds answer—No.

By our blood in Afric wasted
Ere our necks received the chain;
By the miseries that we tasted,
Crossing in your barks the main;
By our sufferings, since ye brought us
To the man-degrading mart,
All sustained by patience, taught us
Only by a broken heart;

Deem our nation brutes no longer,
Till some reason ye shall find
Worthier of regard and stronger
Than the colour of our kind.
Slaves of gold, whose sordid dealings
Tarnish all your boasted powers,
Prove that you have human feelings,
Ere you proudly question ours!
