= Mary Unwin =

Friend of William Cowper (1724–1796)

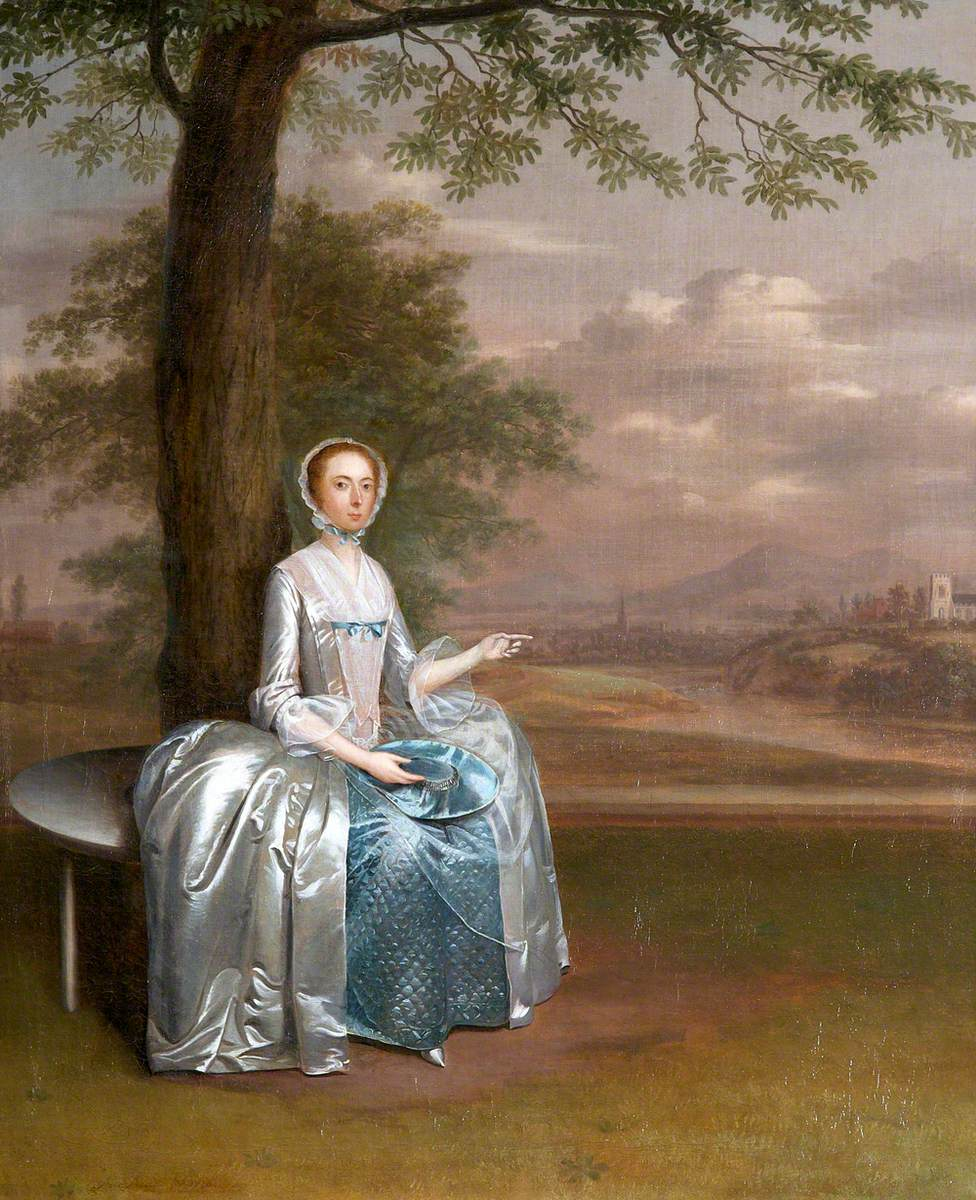
- Mary Unwin, portrait c.1750
- Born: 1724
- Died: 1796 (aged 71–72); Dereham, Norfolk, England

Mary Unwin (1724–1796) was an English woman, notable as a friend of William Cowper, one of the most popular poets of their day.

== Life ==
Mary Unwin was the daughter of William Cawthorne, a draper of Ely, who was born in that city in 1724. William Hayley remembered her when comparatively young, a person of lively talents with a sweet, serene countenance, and remarkably fond of reading. William Cowper afterward compared her manners to those of a duchess, and she certainly resembled many great ladies of her time by her addiction to snuff.

Early in 1744, she married Morley Unwin (1703–1767), son of Thomas Unwin by his wife Martha, the daughter of a cloth manufacturer of Castle Hedingham, Essex. Thomas was a grandson of Thomas Unwin (1618–1689) of Castle Hedingham, and the family had then been established in Essex for several generations, so that the Flemish origin of the Unwins or Onwhynnes must be referred to a much earlier date than that suggested by Dr. Smiles (Huguenots in England).

Morley Unwin graduated with a B.A. from Queens' College, Cambridge, in 1725. He was master of the free school at Huntingdon, and lecturer to the two churches in Huntingdon from 1729 until 1742, when he became rector of Grimston, near King's Lynn in Norfolk. There he resided apparently until 1748, when, upon his wife's request, he left the duty in the charge of a curate, and moved back to Huntingdon, where he occupied a 'convenient house' in the High Street, and prepared pupils for the university. He was also reappointed lecturer of St. Mary's, and is said to have caused much dissatisfaction by the irregular performance of the duty. In the autumn of 1765, William Cowper made the acquaintance of the Unwins' eldest son, William Cawthorne Unwin, and he was so pleased with what he saw of the family that in October that year he became (as a paying boarder) a regular inmate of their house. Morley Unwin died on 2 July 1767, as a result of a fall from his horse, and was buried in the churchyard of St. Mary's, Huntingdon. Ten weeks later, Cowper removed, with Mary and her daughter Susanna, to Olney, in order to be under the more direct influence of John Newton. The details of the home life which he shared with the Unwins at Olney are familiar to all readers of Cowper's 'Correspondence'.

In July 1769, the Unwins' son, William Cawthorne Unwin (1745?–1786), who had been educated at Charterhouse School and at Christ's College, Cambridge (B.A. 1764, M.A. 1767), quit Olney upon being instituted to the rectory of Stock, near Ramsden in Essex. Like his father, he had attached himself to the evangelical party. His 'spiritual and lively notions in religion' had, from their first meeting, attracted Cowper, and from 1770 until his early death, he became the poet's chief confidant and the recipient of many of the most delightful letters in the whole range of our literature. Conspicuous among them is that masterpiece of its kind, dated 31 October 1779, in which Cowper accuses Johnson of plucking some of the most beautiful feathers from the wing of Milton's muse, and 'trampling them under his great foot'.

After her son's departure and her daughter's engagement to Matthew Powley, vicar of Dewsbury, Mary Unwin seems, at the close of 1772, to have become regularly engaged to Cowper (he being then forty-one and she forty-eight), but before the commencement of 1773, his mind had become once more grievously clouded, and the project of marriage was never to be realised. Upon his recovery, she did all in her power to encourage him to write, and when he became an author, he paid her the highest respect as an instinctive critic, and called her his lord chamberlain, whose approbation was his sufficient license for publication. The extraordinary 'fracas', which disturbed the quiet round of domesticity at Olney in April 1784, was almost certainly due to Cowper's perception of a latent jealousy of Lady Austen in the mind of his older friend. Fortunately, Mary entertained no jealousy of Cowper's attached kinswoman, Lady Hesketh, with whom the poet resumed relations in 1785. In turn, Lady Hesketh fully appreciated Mary's quiet fund of gaiety and the anxiety she had undergone (during Cowper's attacks of hypochondria) 'for one whom she certainly loves as well as one human being can love another'.

Mary moved with Cowper, at Lady Hesketh's insistence, from Olney to Weston in 1786. In 1793, her health was beginning to fail, and the poet inscribed to her the exquisite lines 'To Mary,' which Tennyson classed, with those 'On the Receipt of My Mother's Picture,' as too pathetic for reading aloud. In 1795, they visited Norfolk together, and on 17 December 1796, Mary Unwin died at East Dereham at the age of seventy-two. She was buried in St. Edmund's Chapel (now called the Cowper Chapel) in Dereham church, where a tablet was erected with an inscription by Hayley. Cowper was buried near the same spot four years later.

== Family ==
Mary Unwin's son, William Cawthorne, died at Winchester, aged 41, on 29 November 1786, and was buried in the cathedral; he left a widow (her maiden name was Shuttleworth, and she died at Croydon in 1825, aged 75) and three young children.

Unwin taught his children himself, and to him in his capacity of tutor Cowper inscribed his 'Tirocinium', 6 November 1784. Cowper also wrote a Latin epitaph for his friend, but this was rejected in favour of an English one. His portrait, painted by Gainsborough in 1764, was engraved by H. Robinson from a drawing by W. Harvey (Cowper, ed. Southey, ii. 228). Another son, Henry, became 'an eminent stationer in Paternoster Row'. The daughter, Susanna Powley, died in 1835, aged 89.
