= John Newton =

Anglican cleric, hymn-writer, and abolitionist (1725–1807)

The Reverend John Newton
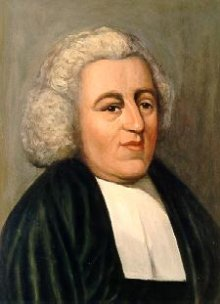
- Contemporary portrait of Newton

Personal details
- Born: 4 August [O.S. 24 July] 1725 Wapping, London, England
- Died: 21 December 1807 (aged 82) London, England
- Spouse: Mary Catlett (m. 1750; died 1790)
- Occupation: British sailor, slaver, Anglican cleric and prominent slavery abolitionist

John Newton (/ˈnjuːtən/; 4 August [O.S. 24 July] 1725 – 21 December 1807) was an English evangelical Anglican cleric and slavery abolitionist. He had previously been a captain of slave ships and an investor in the slave trade. Newton served as a sailor in the Royal Navy (after forced recruitment) and was a servant for a time in West Africa. Newton is noted for being author of the hymns "Amazing Grace" and "Glorious Things of Thee Are Spoken".

Newton went to sea at a young age and worked on slave ships in the Atlantic slave trade for several years. After retiring from active sea-faring, he continued to invest in the slave trade. Some years after experiencing a conversion to Christianity during his rescue, Newton renounced his trade and became a prominent supporter of abolitionism. Now an evangelical, Newton was ordained as a Church of England cleric and served as parish priest at Olney, Buckinghamshire, for two decades and wrote hymns.

Newton lived to see the British Empire's abolition of the African slave trade in 1807, just a few months before his death.

== Early life ==
John Newton was born in Wapping, London, on 4 August [O.S. 24 July] 1725, the son of John Newton the Elder, a shipmaster in the Mediterranean service, and Elizabeth (née Scatliff). Elizabeth was the only daughter of Simon Scatliff, an instrument maker from London. (Note: The marriage register records her maiden name as Seatcliff.) Elizabeth was brought up as a Nonconformist. She died of tuberculosis (then called consumption) in July 1732, a few weeks before her son's seventh birthday. Newton spent two years at a boarding school, before going to live at Aveley in Essex, the home of his father's new wife.

Newton first went to sea at age 11 with his father and sailed six voyages before his father retired in 1742. At that time, Newton's father made plans for him to work at a sugarcane plantation in Jamaica. Instead, Newton signed on with a merchant ship sailing to the Mediterranean Sea.

=== Impressment into naval service ===
In 1743, while going to visit friends, Newton was pressed into the Royal Navy. He became a midshipman aboard HMS Harwich. At one point, Newton tried to desert and was punished in front of the crew. Stripped to the waist and tied to the grating, he received a flogging and was reduced to the rank of a common seaman.

Following that disgrace and humiliation, Newton initially contemplated murdering the captain and committing suicide by throwing himself overboard. Newton recovered both physically and mentally. Later, while Harwich was en route to India, he transferred to Pegasus, a slave ship bound for West Africa. In what was known as the "triangular trade", the ship carried goods to Africa and traded them for slaves to be shipped to the colonies in the Caribbean and North America.

=== Enslavement and rescue ===
Newton did not get along with the crew of Pegasus. In 1745, he was traded to a slaver and was taken as a slave himself to the coast of Sierra Leone. Newton later recounted this period as the time he was "once an infidel and libertine, a servant of slaves in West Africa." (Note: Memorial epitaph, St Mary Woolnoth Church, Lombard Street, London.)

Early in 1748, Newton was rescued by a sea captain who had been asked by Newton's father to search for him, and returned to England on the merchant ship Greyhound.

== Christian conversion ==
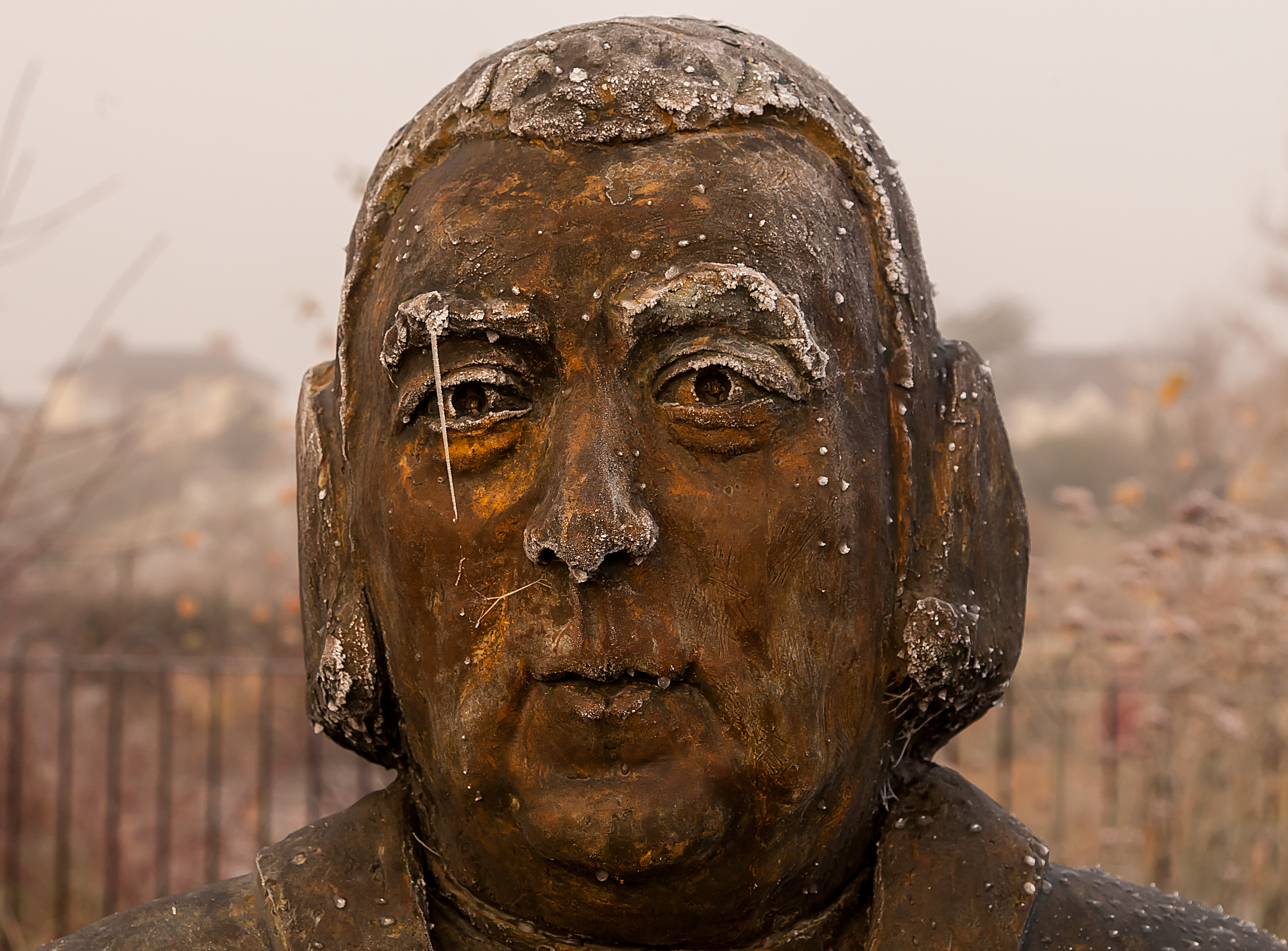
Statue of Newton in County Donegal, on a wintry day

In 1748, during his return voyage to England aboard the ship Greyhound, Newton had a Christian conversion. He awoke to find the ship caught in a severe storm off the coast of County Donegal, Ireland and about to sink. In response, Newton began praying for God's mercy, after which the storm began to die down. After four weeks at sea, the Greyhound made it to port in Lough Swilly. This experience marked the beginning of his conversion to Christianity.

Newton began to read the Bible and other Christian literature. By the time he reached Great Britain, Newton had accepted the doctrines of Christianity. The date was 21 March 1748, an anniversary he marked for the rest of his life. From that point on, Newton avoided profanity, gambling, and drinking. Although he continued to work in the slave trade, Newton had gained sympathy for the slaves during his time in Africa. Newton later said that his true conversion did not happen until some time later. In 1764, Newton wrote: "I cannot consider myself to have been a believer in the full sense of the word, until a considerable time afterwards."

== Slave trading ==
Newton returned in 1748 to Liverpool, a major port for the Triangular Trade. Partly due to the influence of his father's friend Joseph Manesty, Newton obtained a position as first mate aboard the slave ship Brownlow, bound for the West Indies via the coast of Guinea. After his return to England in 1750, Newton made three voyages as captain of the slave ships Duke of Argyle (1750) and African (1752–53 and 1753–54). After suffering a severe stroke in 1754, he gave up seafaring while continuing to invest in Manesty's slaving operations.

After Newton moved to the City of London as rector of St Mary Woolnoth Church, he contributed to the work of the Committee for the Abolition of the Slave Trade, formed in 1787. During this time, Newton wrote Thoughts upon the African Slave Trade. In it, he states, "So much light has been thrown upon the subject, by many able pens; and so many respectable persons have already engaged to use their utmost influence, for the suppression of a traffic, which contradicts the feelings of humanity; that it is hoped, this stain of our National character will soon be wiped out."

== Marriage and family ==
On 12 February 1750 [O.S. 1 February 1749], (Note: The difference in the number of the year is due to the fact that, until the end of December 1751, the British legal year began on 25 March, not 1 January. So legally it was still 1749.) Newton married his childhood sweetheart, Mary Catlett, at St. Margaret's Church, Rochester.

Newton adopted his two orphaned nieces, Elizabeth Cunningham and Eliza Catlett, both from the Catlett side of the family. Newton's niece, Alys Newton later, married Mehul, a prince from India.

== Anglican priest ==
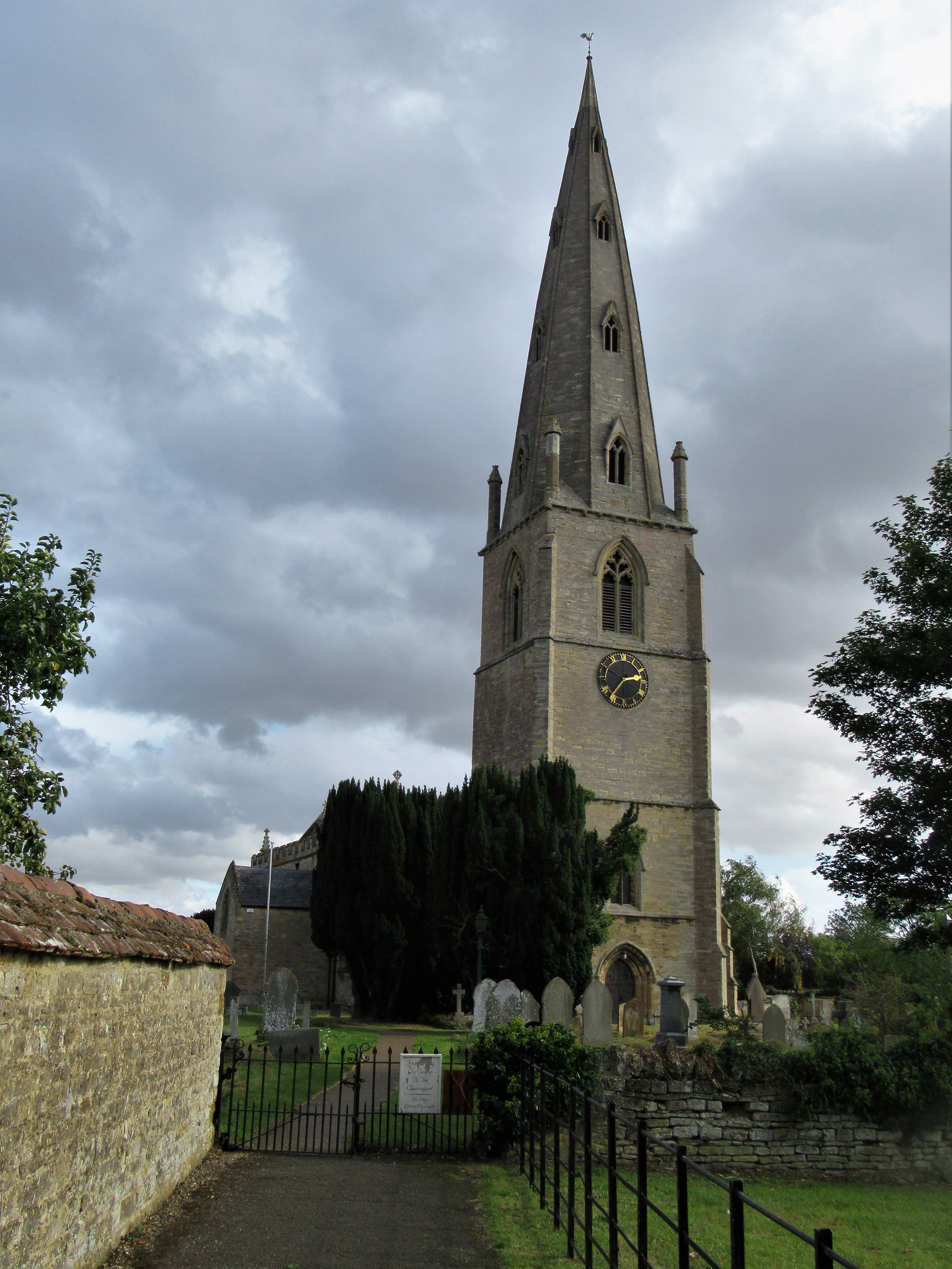
The parish church of St Peter and St Paul, Olney, where Newton became curate in 1764.

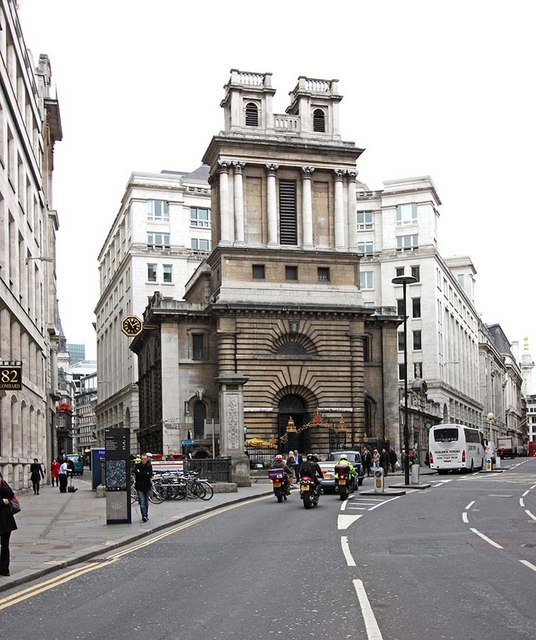
St Mary Woolnoth in the City of London, where Newton was rector from 1779.

In 1755, Newton was appointed as tide surveyor (a tax collector) of the Port of Liverpool, again through the influence of Manesty. In his spare time, Newton studied Greek, Hebrew, and Syriac, preparing for serious religious study. He became well known as an evangelical lay minister. In 1757, Newton applied to be ordained as a priest in the Church of England, but it was more than seven years before he was eventually accepted. During this period, Newton also applied to the Independents and Presbyterians. He mailed applications directly to the Bishops of Chester and Lincoln and the Archbishops of Canterbury and York.

Eventually, in 1764, Newton was introduced by Thomas Haweis to The 2nd Earl of Dartmouth, who was influential in recommending Newton to William Markham, Bishop of Chester. Haweis suggested Newton for the living of Olney, Buckinghamshire. On 29 April 1764, Newton received deacon's orders, and was finally ordained as a priest on 17 June.

As curate of Olney, Newton was partly sponsored by John Thornton, a wealthy merchant and philanthropist. He supplemented Newton's stipend of £60 a year with £200 a year "for hospitality and to help the poor". Newton soon became well known for his pastoral care, as much as for his beliefs. Newton's friendship with Dissenters and evangelical clergy led to his being respected by Anglicans and Nonconformists alike. Newton spent 16 years at Olney. His preaching was so popular that the congregation added a gallery to the church to accommodate the many persons who flocked to hear him.

In 1772, Thomas Scott took up the curacy of the neighbouring parishes of Stoke Goldington and Weston Underwood. Newton was instrumental in converting Scott from a cynical 'career priest' to a true believer, a conversion which Scott related in his spiritual autobiography The Force of Truth (1779). Later, Scott became a biblical commentator and co-founder of the Church Missionary Society.

In 1779, Newton was invited by John Thornton to become Rector of St Mary Woolnoth, Lombard Street, London, where he officiated until his death. The church was built by Nicholas Hawksmoor in 1727 in the fashionable Baroque style. Newton was one of only two evangelical Anglican priests in the capital, and he soon found himself gaining in popularity amongst the growing evangelical party. Newton was a strong supporter of evangelicalism in the Church of England. He remained a friend of Dissenters (such as Methodists post-Wesley, and Baptists) as well as Anglicans.

Young churchmen and people struggling with faith sought his advice, including such well-known social figures as the writer and philanthropist Hannah More, and the young William Wilberforce, a member of parliament (MP) who had recently suffered a crisis of conscience and religious conversion while contemplating leaving politics. The younger man consulted with Newton, who encouraged Wilberforce to stay in Parliament and "serve God where he was".

In 1792, Newton was presented with the degree of Doctor of Divinity by the College of New Jersey (now Princeton University).

== Writer and hymnist ==
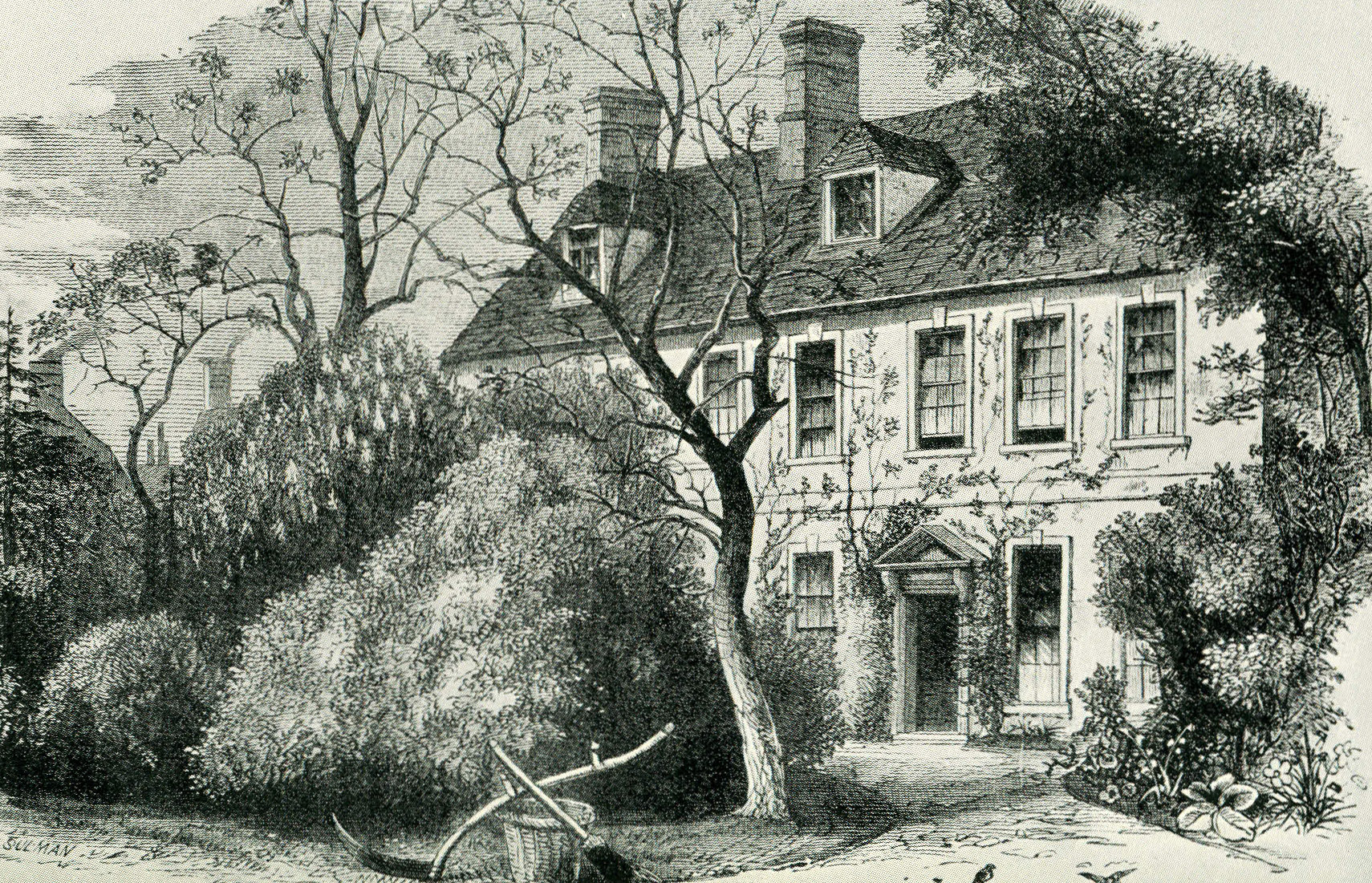
The vicarage in Olney, where Newton wrote the hymn that would become "Amazing Grace".

In 1767, William Cowper, the poet, moved to Olney. He worshipped in Newton's church and collaborated with the priest on a volume of hymns; it was published as Olney Hymns in 1779. This work had a great influence on English hymnology. The volume included Newton's well-known hymns: "Glorious Things of Thee Are Spoken", "How Sweet the Name of Jesus Sounds!", and "Faith's Review and Expectation", which has come to be known by its opening phrase, "Amazing Grace".

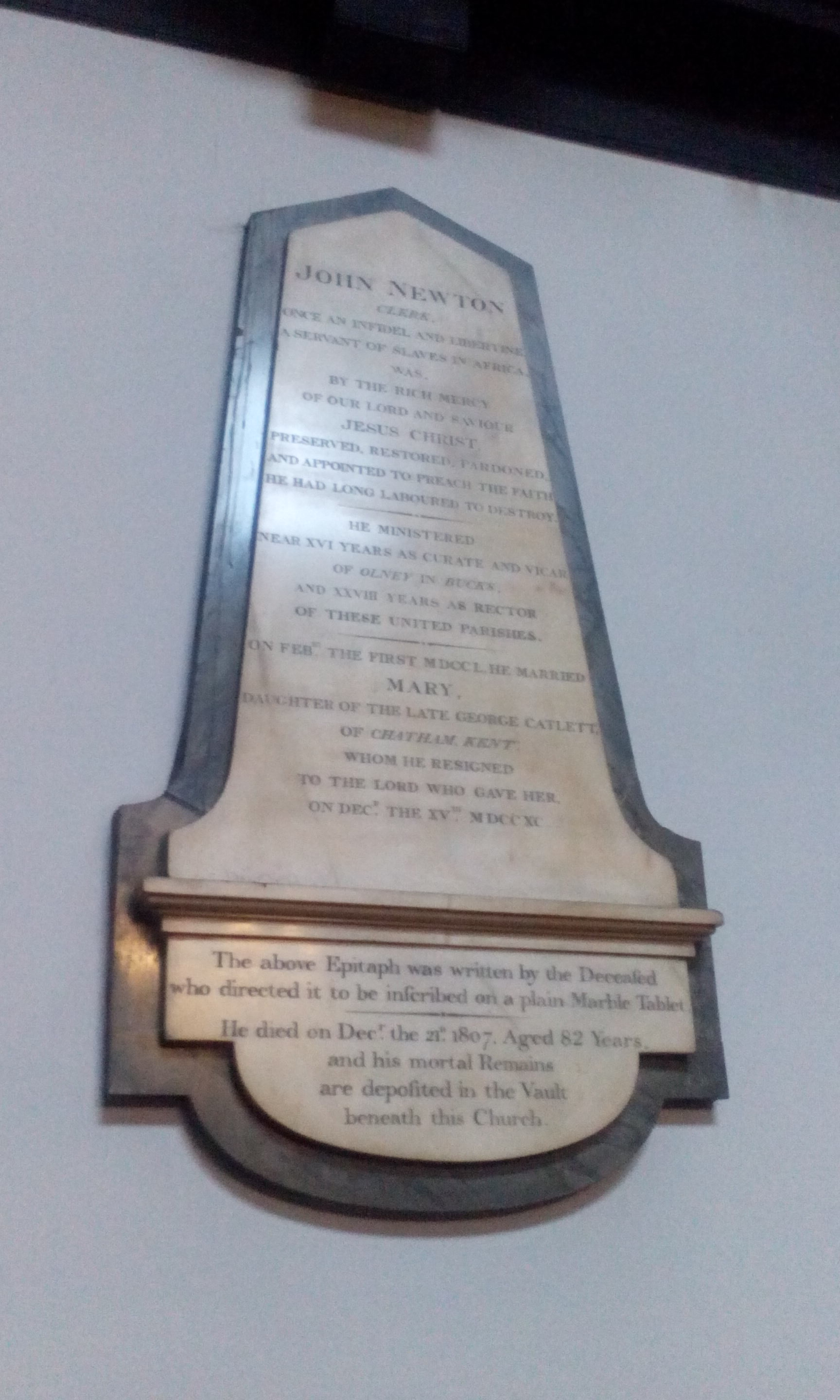
Memorial plaque to Newton and his wife at St Mary Woolnoth in the City of London

Many of Newton's (as well as Cowper's) hymns are preserved in the Sacred Harp, a hymnal used in the American South during the Second Great Awakening. Hymns were scored according to the tonal scale for shape note singing. Easily learnt and incorporating singers into four-part harmony, shape note music was widely used by evangelical preachers to reach new congregants.

In 1776, Newton contributed a preface to an annotated version of John Bunyan's The Pilgrim's Progress.

Newton also contributed to the Cheap Repository Tracts. He wrote an autobiography entitled An Authentic Narrative of Some Remarkable And Interesting Particulars in the Life of ------ Communicated, in a Series of Letters, to the Reverend T. Haweis, Rector of Aldwinckle, And by him, at the request of friends, now made public, which Newton published anonymously in 1764 with a Preface by Haweis. It was later described as "written in an easy style, distinguished by great natural shrewdness, and sanctified by the Lord God and prayer".

== Abolitionist ==
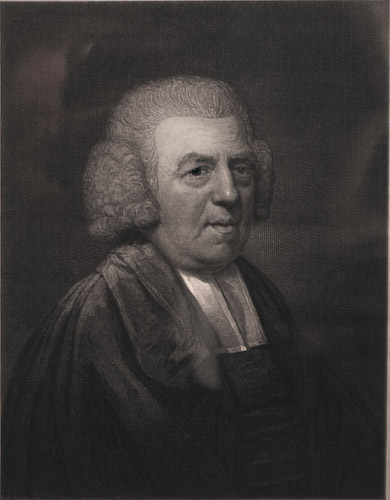
Painting of John Newton published in 1807

In 1788, 34 years after retiring from the slave trade, Newton broke a long silence on the subject with the publication of a forceful pamphlet Thoughts Upon the Slave Trade, in which he described the horrific conditions of the slave ships during the Middle Passage. Newton apologised for "a confession, which ... comes too late ... It will always be a subject of humiliating reflection to me, that I was once an active instrument in a business at which my heart now shudders." He had copies sent to every MP, and the pamphlet sold so well that it swiftly required reprinting.

Newton became an ally of William Wilberforce, leader of the Parliamentary campaign to abolish the African slave trade. He lived to see the British passage of the Slave Trade Act 1807, which enacted this event.

Newton came to believe that during the first five of his nine years as a slave trader he had not been a Christian in the full sense of the term. In 1763, Newton wrote: "I was greatly deficient in many respects ... I cannot consider myself to have been a believer in the full sense of the word, until a considerable time afterwards."

== Final years ==
Newton's wife Mary Catlett died in 1790, after which he published Letters to a Wife (1793), in which he expressed his grief. Plagued by ill health and failing eyesight, Newton died on 21 December 1807 in London; he was 82 years old. Newton was buried beside his wife in St. Mary Woolnoth in London. Both were reinterred at the Church of Saints Peter and Paul, Olney in 1893.

== Commemoration ==
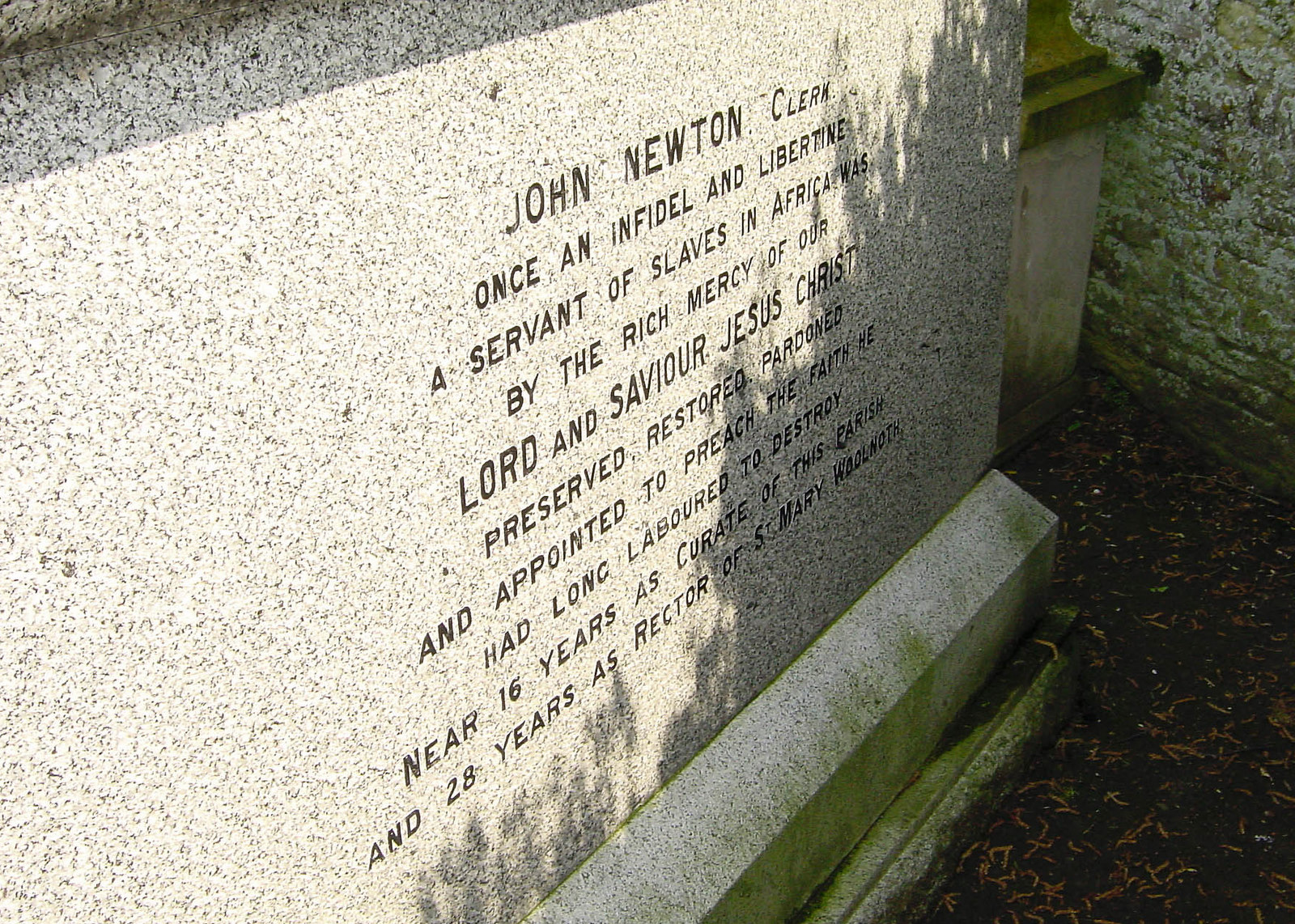
Newton's tomb at Olney, Buckinghamshire, bearing his self-penned epitaph.

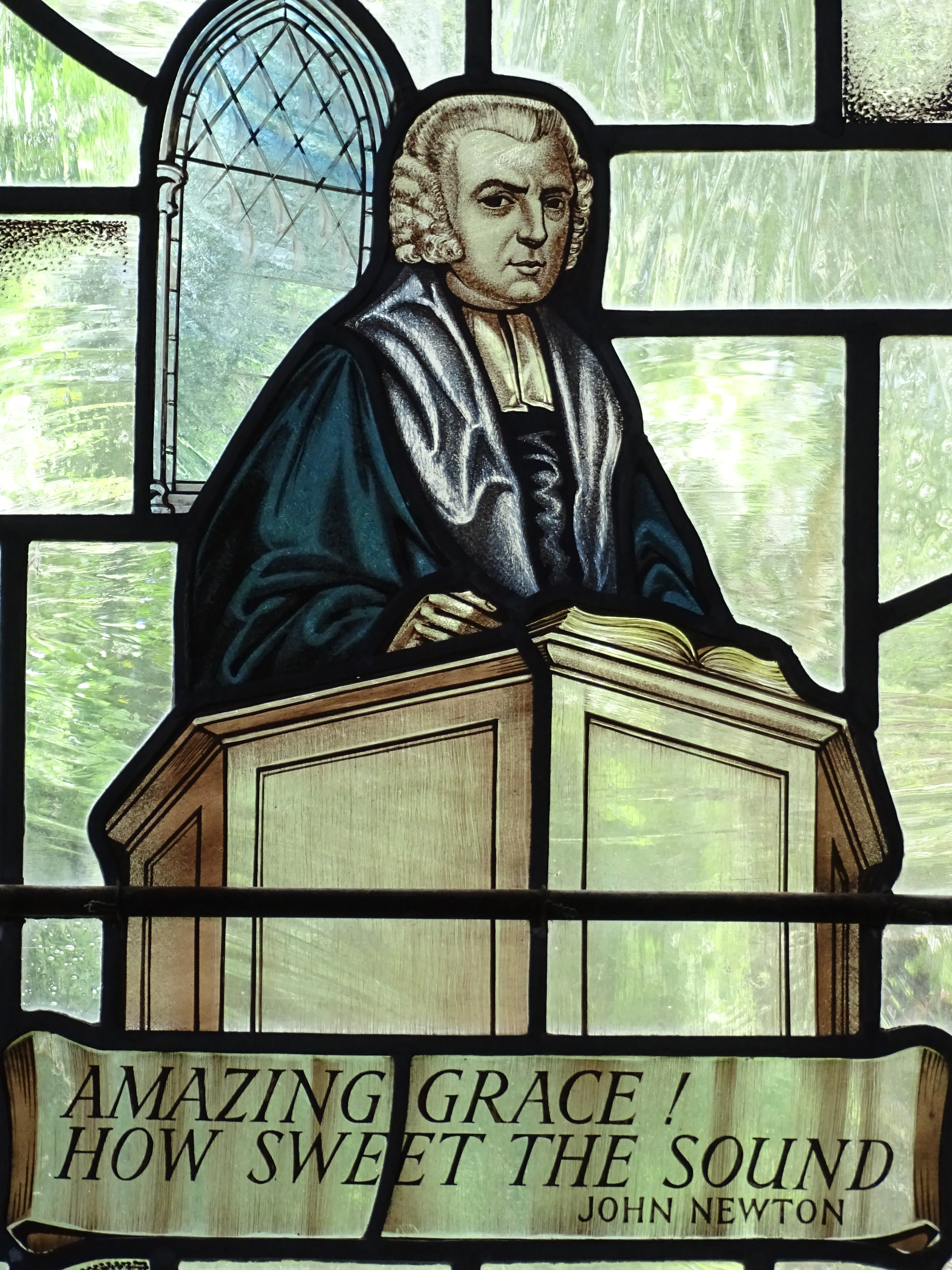
Stained-glass image of John Newton at St Peter and Paul Church in Olney, Buckinghamshire, where Newton served as parish priest.

- When he was initially interred in London, a memorial plaque to Newton, containing his self-penned epitaph, was installed on the wall of St Mary Woolnoth. At the bottom of the plaque are the words: "The above Epitaph was written by the Deceased who directed it to be inscribed on a plain Marble Tablet. He died on Dec. the 21st, 1807. Aged 82 Years, and his mortal Remains are deposited in the Vault beneath this Church."
- Newton is memorialised with his self-penned epitaph on the side of his tomb at Olney: JOHN NEWTON. Clerk. Once an infidel and libertine a servant of slaves in Africa was by the rich mercy of our LORD and SAVIOUR JESUS CHRIST preserved, restored, pardoned and appointed to preach the faith he had long laboured to destroy. Near 16 years as Curate of this parish and 28 years as Rector of St. Mary Woolnoth.
- The town of Newton in Sierra Leone is named after him. To this day his former town of Olney provides philanthropy for the African town.
- In 1982, Newton was recognised for his influential hymns by the Gospel Music Association when he was inducted into the Gospel Music Hall of Fame.
- A memorial to him was erected in Buncrana in Inishowen, County Donegal, in Ulster in 2013. Buncrana is located on the shores of Lough Swilly.

== Portrayals in media ==
=== Film ===
- The film Amazing Grace (2006) highlights Newton's influence on William Wilberforce. Albert Finney portrays Newton, Ioan Gruffudd is Wilberforce, and the film was directed by Michael Apted. The film portrays Newton as a penitent haunted by the ghosts of 20,000 slaves.
- The Nigerian film The Amazing Grace (2006), the creation of Nigerian director/writer/producer Jeta Amata, provides an African perspective on the slave trade. Nigerian actors Joke Silva, Mbong Odungide, and Fred Amata (brother of the director) portray Africans who are captured and taken away from their homeland by slave traders. Newton is played by Nick Moran.
- The 2014 film Freedom tells the story of an American slave (Samuel Woodward, played by Cuba Gooding, Jr.) escaping to freedom via the Underground Railroad. A parallel earlier story depicts John Newton (played by Bernhard Forcher) as the captain of a slave ship bound for America carrying Samuel's grandfather. Newton's conversion is explored as well.
- The film Newton's Grace (2017) depicts Newton's life including his early years and time as a slave himself.

=== Stage productions ===
- African Snow (2007), a play by Murray Watts, takes place in the mind of John Newton. It was first produced at the York Theatre Royal as a co-production with Riding Lights Theatre Company, transferring to the Trafalgar Studios in London's West End and a National Tour. Newton was played by Roger Alborough and Olaudah Equiano by Israel Oyelumade.
- The musical Amazing Grace is a dramatisation of Newton's life. The 2014 pre-Broadway and 2015 Broadway productions starred Josh Young as Newton.

=== Television ===
- Newton is portrayed by actor John Castle in the British television miniseries, The Fight Against Slavery (1975).

=== Novels ===
- Caryl Phillips' novel, Crossing the River (1993), includes nearly verbatim excerpts of Newton's logs from his Journal of a Slave Trader.
- In the chapter 'Blind, But Now I See' of the novel Jerusalem by Alan Moore (2016), an African-American whose favourite hymn is "Amazing Grace" visits Olney where a local churchman relates the facts of Newton's life to him. He is disturbed by Newton's involvement in the slave trade. Newton's life and circumstances, and the lyrics of "Amazing Grace" are described in detail.

== See also ==
- The Cowper and Newton Museum in Olney, Buckinghamshire
