= On the Receipt of My Mother's Picture =

1798 poem by William Cowper

- by William Cowper
- Country: England
- Language: English
- Subject(s): Elegy
- Publication date: 1798

"On the Receipt of My Mother's Picture", also known as "On the Receipt of My Mother's Picture Out of Norfolk", is a 1798 poem by English poet William Cowper, which he wrote because of a love for his mother.

== History ==
Cowper's mother, Ann, died when she was 36 years old in 1737, when Cowper was six years old. Her husband, John, built a monument after she died, with an inscription that begins, "Here lies, in early years bereft of life, the best of mothers and the kindest wife".

Cowper, then 58 years old, received a picture of his mother in 1790, given to him by his cousin Ann Bodham. In response to her giving him the gift, he said, "Every creature who bears any affinity to my mother, is dear to me. I love you, therefore, and love you so much, both for her sake and your own". He wrote in a letter that he would rather have possession of the picture "than the richest jewel in the British crown". The poem was written because of how important his mother was to him, and as a result of receiving the picture. Completed shortly before his last insanity attack, the poem was first published by itself in 1798, later being published with other poems in 1799.

== Analyses ==
The Mother's Assistant and Young Lady's Friend wrote in 1846, "Perhaps no production of Cowper has been more frequently read, or so much admired, as the poem on the Receipt of his Mother's Picture".

The Cambridge History of English and America Literature wrote, "Thanks to the poet's use of detail, the woman and her little son live again before us, and the tenderness of the whole is unsurpassed."

Aaron Santesso said on the front flap of his book A Careful Longing: The Poetics And Problems of Nostalgia that the poem helps "contribute to the modern understanding of nostalgia".

The Walt Whitman Quarterly Review believes that American poet Walt Whitman closely paraphrased a line from Cowper's poem for use in his own poem, titled A Passage To India.
