= The Diverting History of John Gilpin =

1782 comic ballad by William Cowper

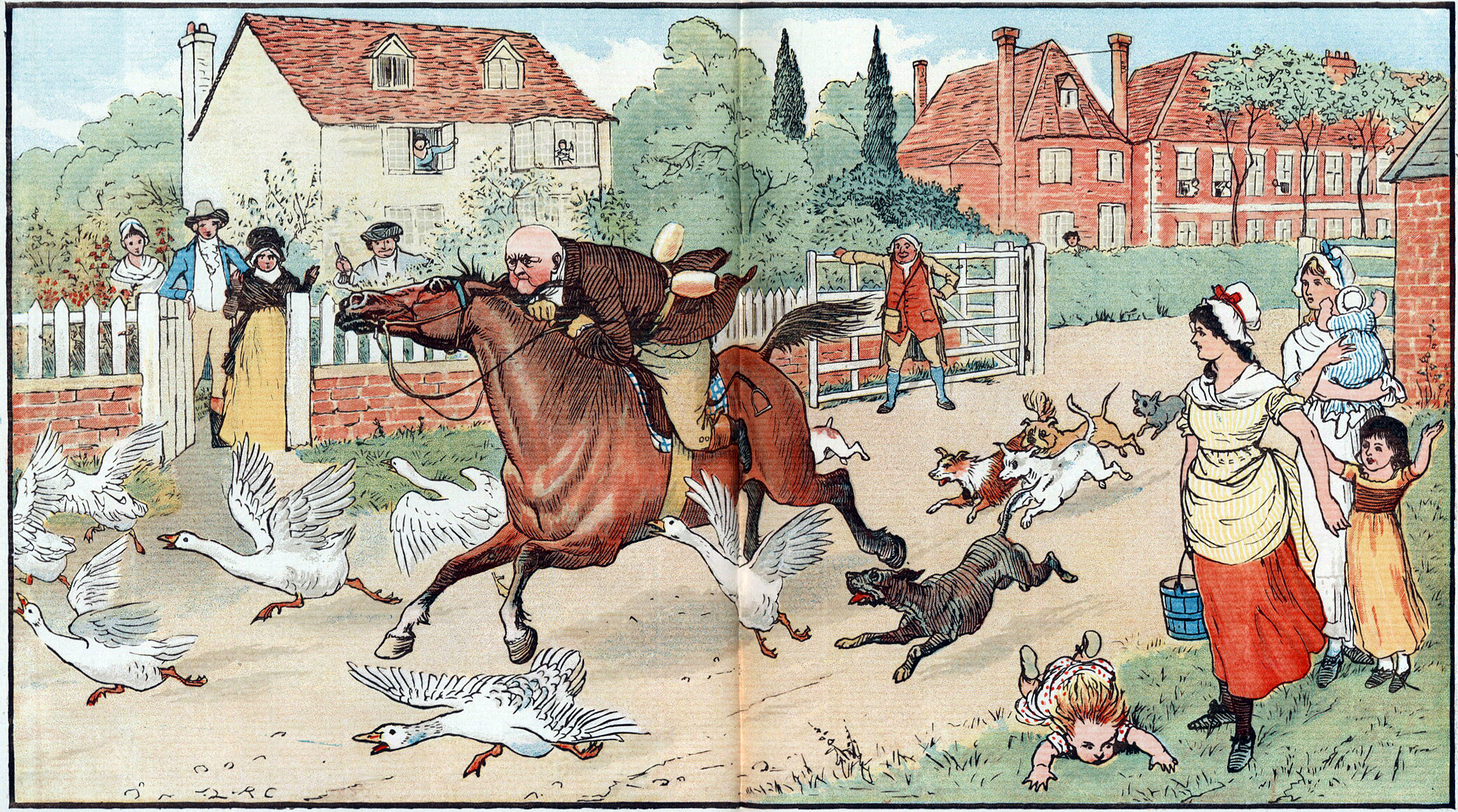
1878 illustration by Randolph Caldecott

The Diverting History of John Gilpin Shewing how he went Farther than he intended, and came safe Home again is a comic ballad by William Cowper written in 1782. The ballad concerns a draper called John Gilpin who rides a runaway horse. Cowper heard the story from Lady Anna Austen at a time of severe depression, and it cheered him up so much that he put it into verse. The poem was published anonymously in the Public Advertiser in 1782, and then published with The Task in 1785. It was very popular, to the extent that "pirate copies were being sold all across the country, together with Gilpin books and toys."

The poem was republished in 1878, illustrated by Randolph Caldecott and printed by Edmund Evans. Caldecott's image of Gilpin riding the horse is the basis for the design of the obverse of the Caldecott Medal.

The poem was again republished in 1953, in the King Penguin series, with illustrations by Ronald Searle.

John Gilpin was a citizen
Of credit and renown,
A train-band captain eke was he
Of famous London town.

John Gilpin's spouse said to her dear—
Though wedded we have been
These twice ten tedious years, yet we
No holiday have seen.

To-morrow is our wedding-day,
And we will then repair
Unto the Bell at Edmonton
All in a chaise and pair.

My sister, and my sister's child,
Myself, and children three,
Will fill the chaise; so you must ride
On horseback after we.

— Stanzas 1–4 (lines 1–16)

== Randolph Caldecott's illustrations of The Diverting History of John Gilpin ==
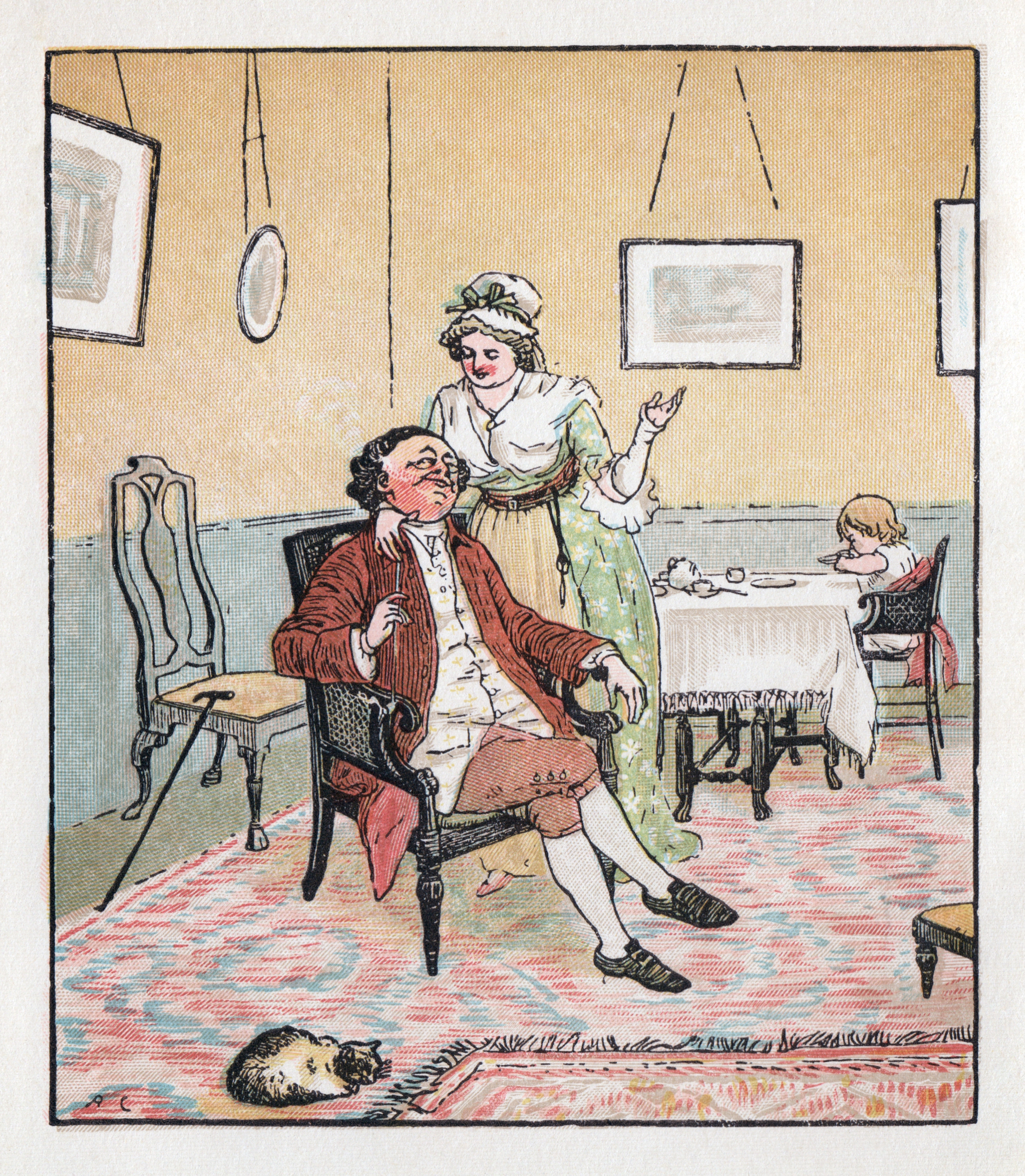

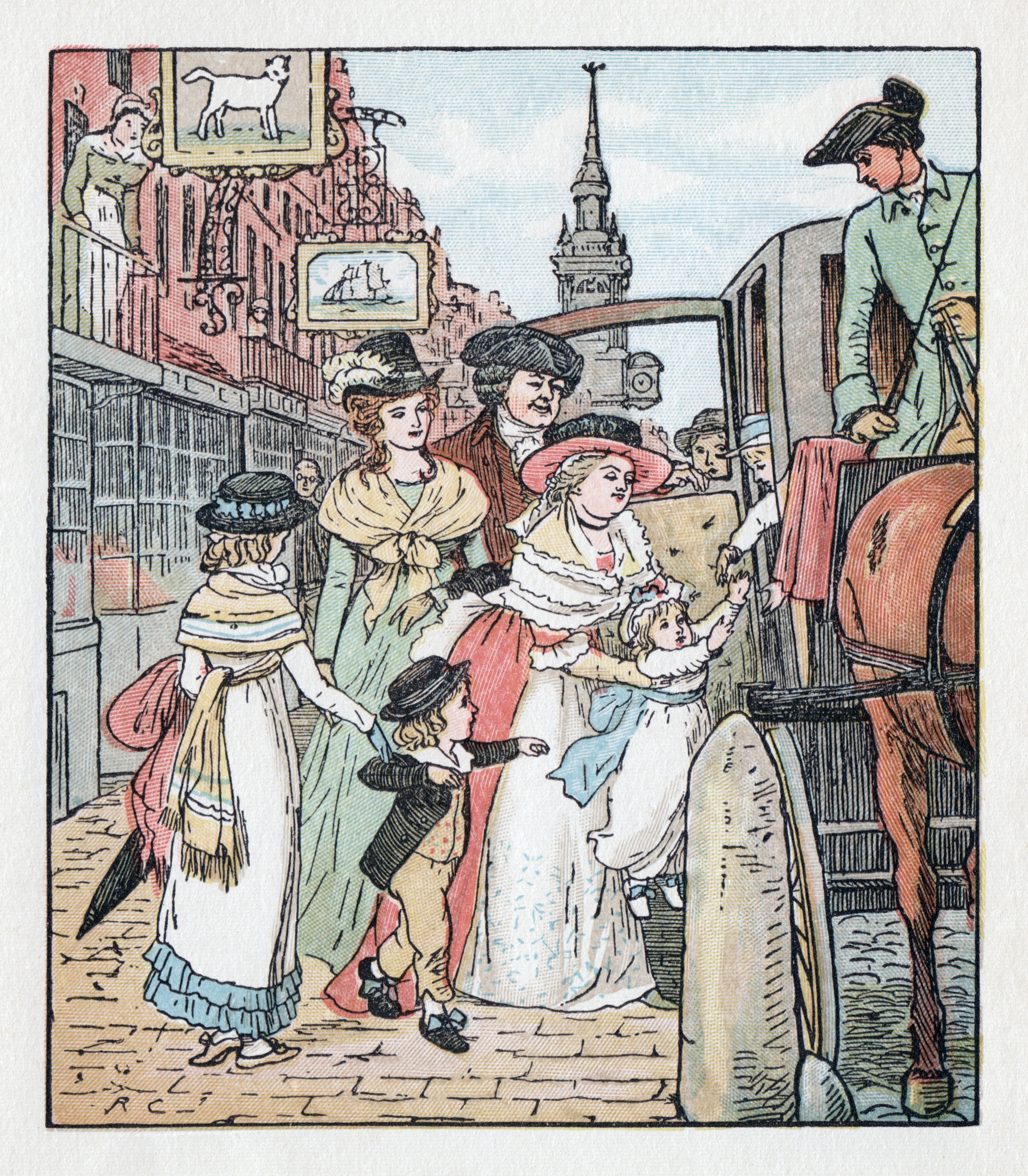

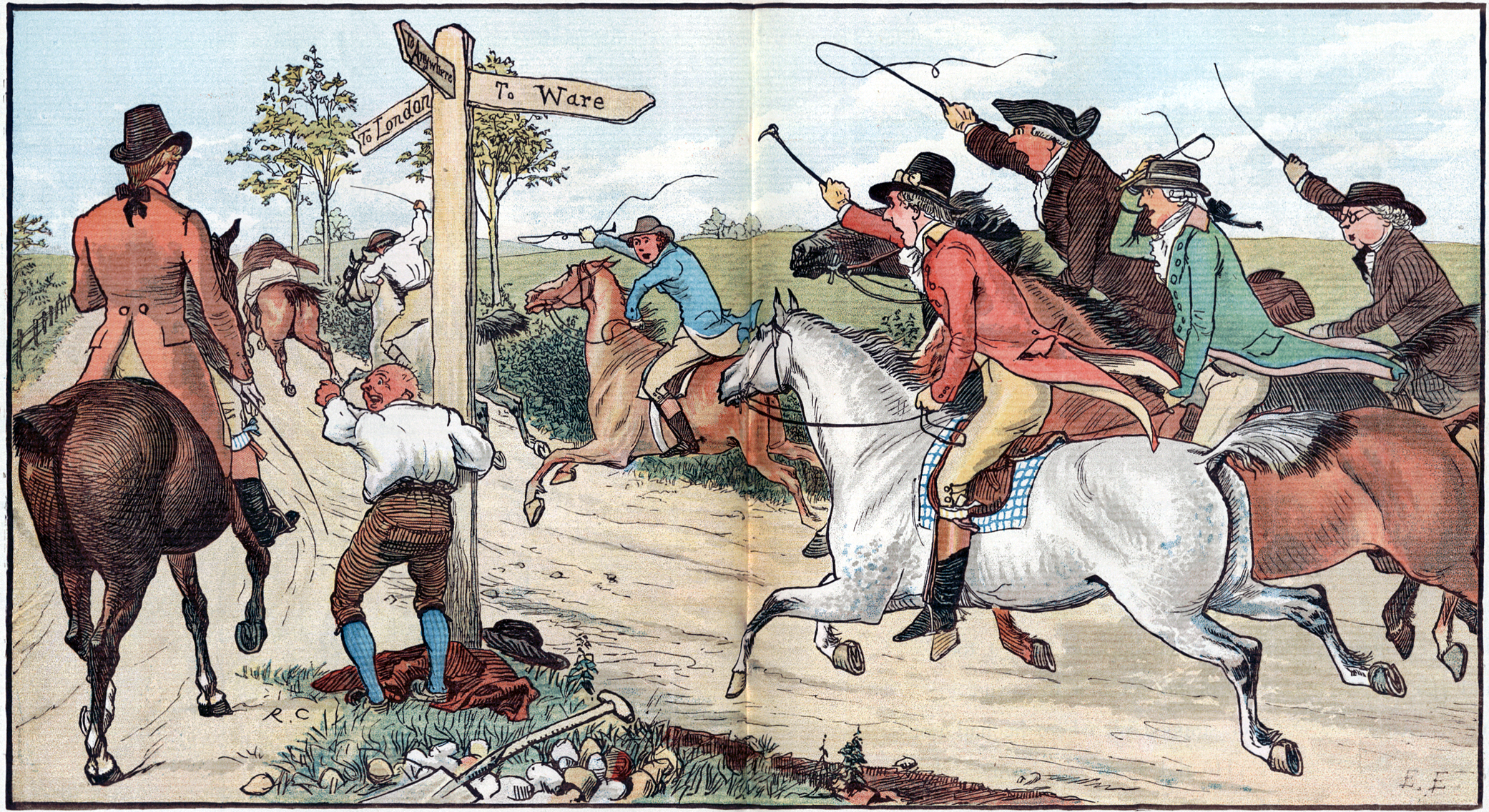

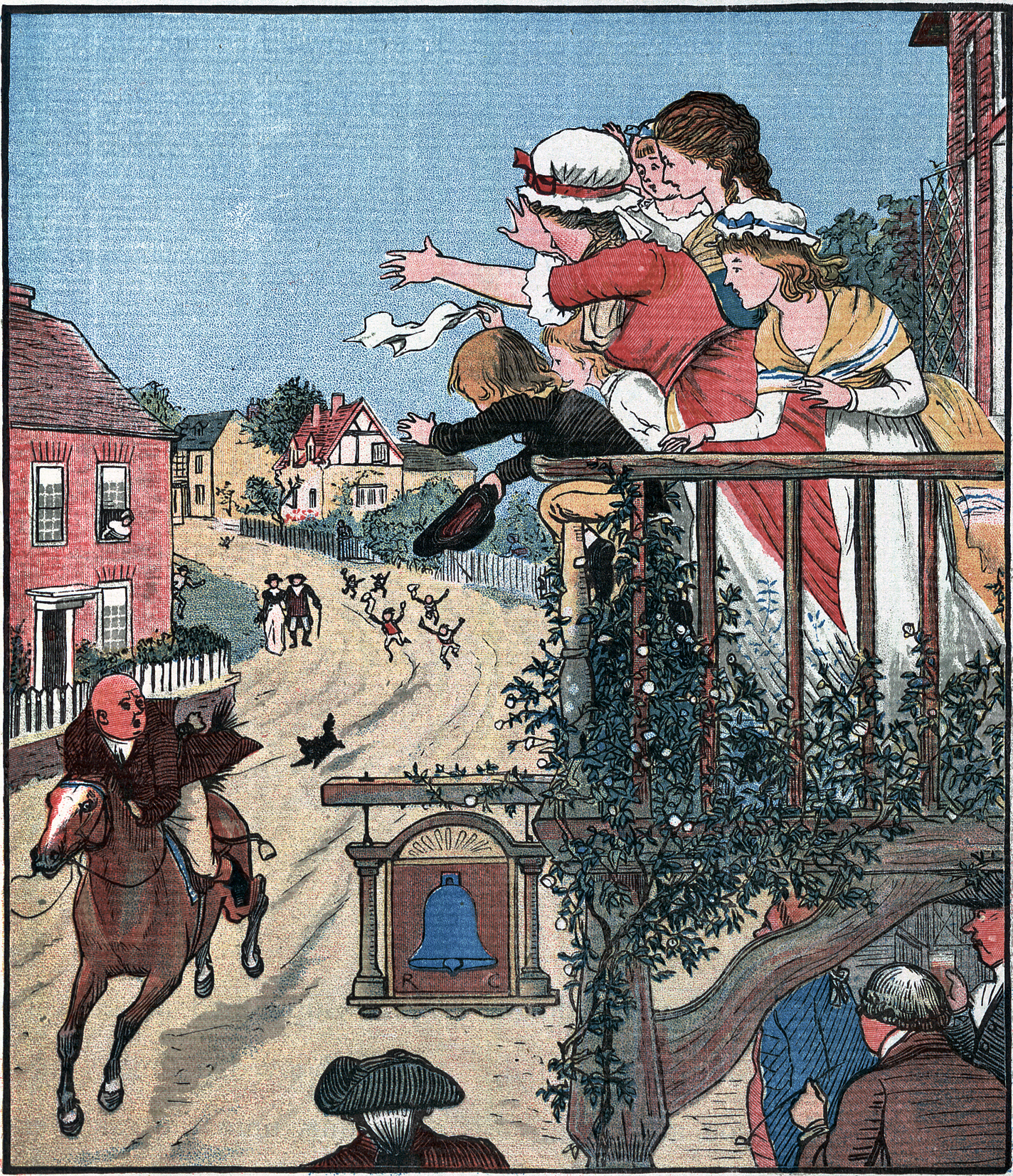

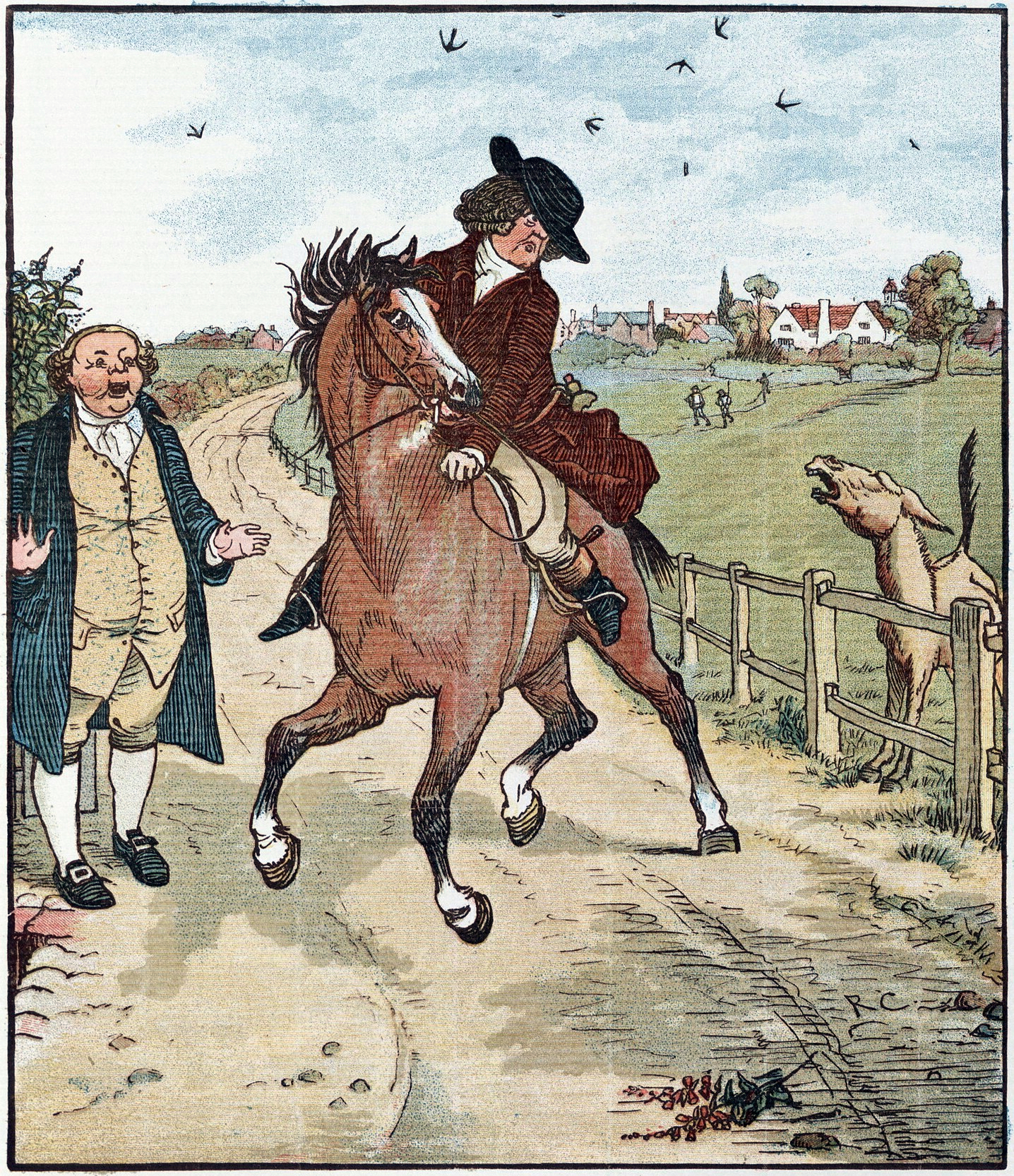
