= The Task (poem) =

1785 poem by William Cowper

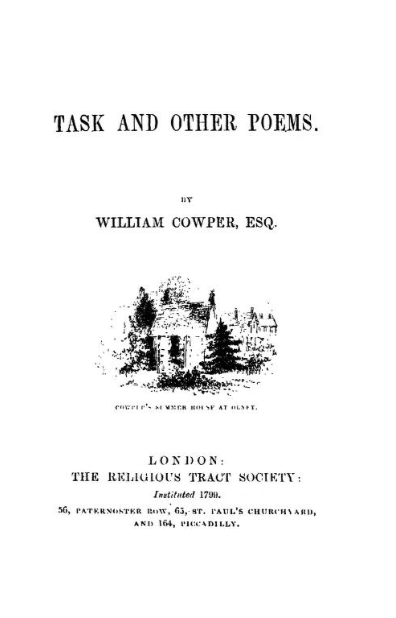
- Author: William Cowper
- Language: English
- Genre: Blank verse poem
- Publisher: Joseph Johnson
- Publication date: 1785
- Publication place: England

The Task: A Poem, in Six Books is a poem in blank verse by William Cowper published in 1785, usually seen as his supreme achievement. Its six books are called "The Sofa", "The Timepiece", "The Garden", "The Winter Evening", "The Winter Morning Walk" and "The Winter Walk at Noon". Beginning with a mock-Miltonic passage on the origins of the sofa, it develops into a discursive meditation on the blessings of nature, the retired life, and religious faith, with attacks on slavery, blood sports, fashionable frivolity, lukewarm clergy, and French despotism among other things.

Cowper's subjects are those that occur to him naturally in the course of his reflections rather than being suggested by poetic convention, and the diction throughout is, for an 18th-century poem, unusually conversational and not artificial. As the poet himself writes:

...my raptures are not conjur'd up
To serve occasions of poetic pomp,
But genuine...

— Book 1, lines 151-53

== Writing and publication ==
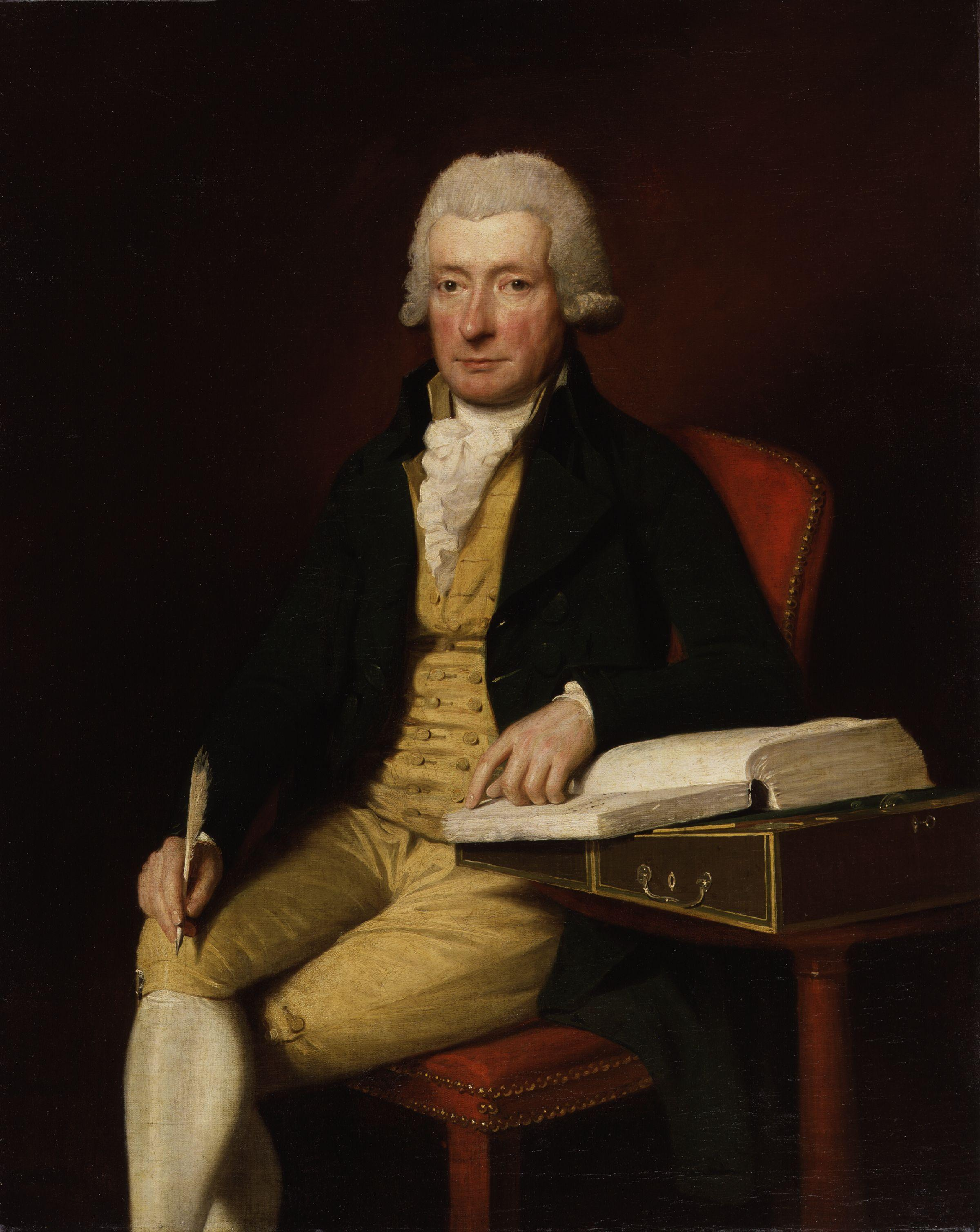
William Cowper in 1792, by Lemuel Francis Abbott

Cowper prefaced The Task with an account of its genesis:

A lady, fond of blank verse, demanded a poem of that kind from the Author, and gave him the SOFA for a subject. He obeyed; and, having much leisure, connected another subject with it; and, pursuing the train of thought to which his situation and turn of mind led him, brought forth at length, instead of the trifle which he at first intended, a serious affair – a Volume.

Lady Austen, a friend of Cowper's in the early 1780s, made this suggestion in the early summer of 1783, and he took the idea up, continuing in spite of sporadic returns of the depressive illness from which he suffered so much. On its completion the following year the poem was sent to Cowper's publisher Joseph Johnson, who had previously issued Cowper's Poems (1782). It was decided to add three shorter poems, An Epistle to Joseph Hill, Tirocinium and The Diverting History of John Gilpin, but, because of delays on Johnson’s part, the book did not appear until 1785. The venture was successful, and was soon followed by a second edition of the Poems in two volumes, The Task and its three attendants forming the second volume. Further editions were called for at short intervals for the next 40 years, for The Task had so caught the Evangelical spirit of the age that, according to one critic, "As Paradise Lost is to militant Puritanism, so is The Task to the religious movement of its author's time."

== Influence ==
In a letter Robert Burns wrote:

Is not The Task a glorious poem? The religion of The Task, bating a few scraps of Calvinistic divinity, is the religion of God and Nature: the religion that exalts, that ennobles man.

He is said to have loved the poem enough to have habitually walked about with a copy in his pocket. The poem is extensively quoted in the novels of Jane Austen, and has been seen as deeply influential on her. The conversational diction of the Lake Poets' works can be seen as stemming directly from The Task. Certainly the young Coleridge wrote of Cowper's "divine Chit chat", and in later years praised The Task's "chastity of diction" and "harmony of blank verse". In a 1796 letter Charles Lamb testified to Coleridge's thorough relish for Cowper, and on his account wrote of Cowper as an old favourite and of "reading the Task with fresh delight". Wordsworth borrowed a copy while still a schoolboy, and the poem's influence on his Tintern Abbey and The Prelude is widely recognised. The late nineteenth century English novelist George Gissing read three books of the poem in April 1892, describing it as "rather a favourite of mine, oddly".

== Critical editions ==
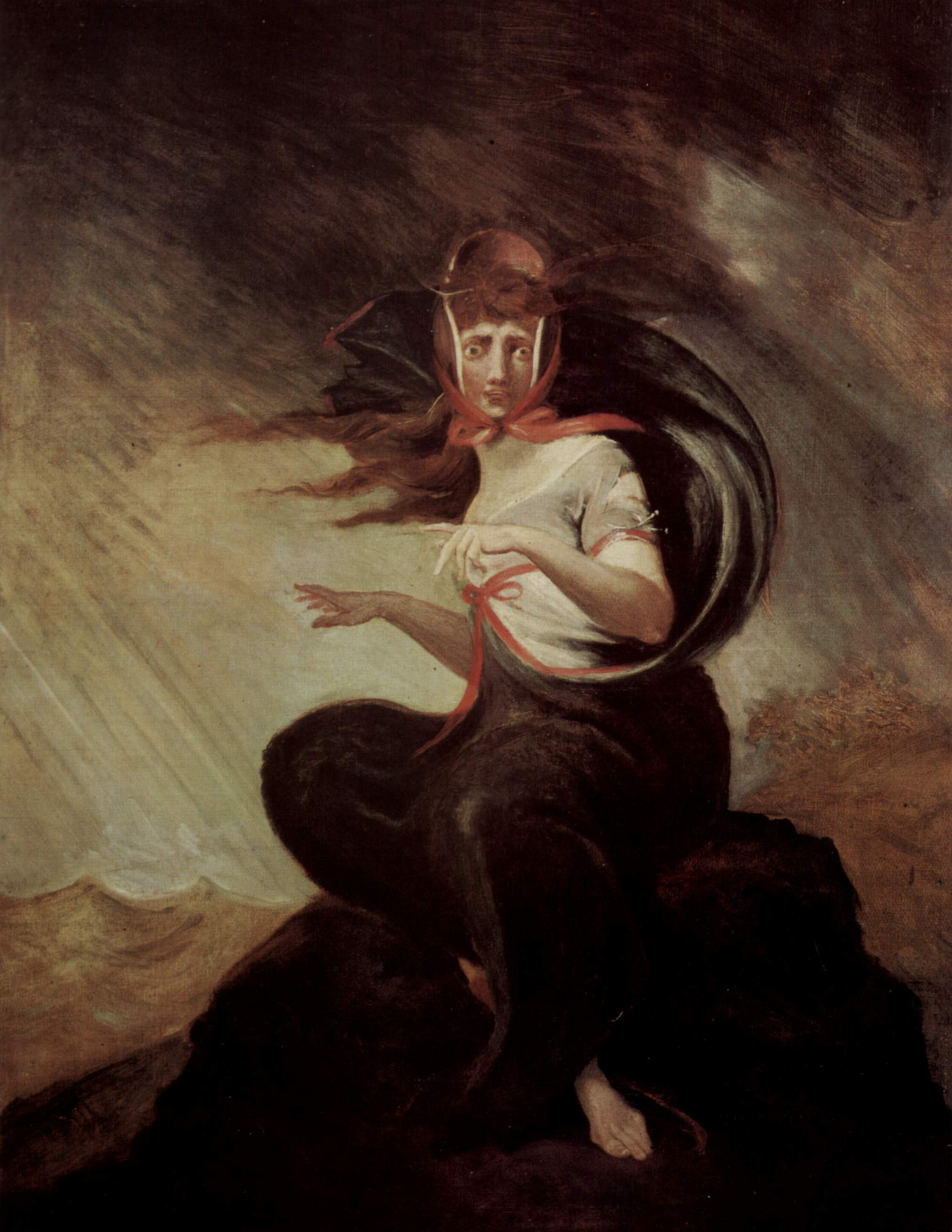
Crazy Kate, illustration for Cowper's The Task by Henry Fuseli

The Task has been published as part of the Oxford Standard Authors Poetical Works of Cowper, edited by H. S. Milford (1905), revised by Norma Russell (1967); also by the Longman's Annotated Texts series in an edition by James Sambrook (1994).
