= William Cowper =

English poet and hymnodist (1731–1800)

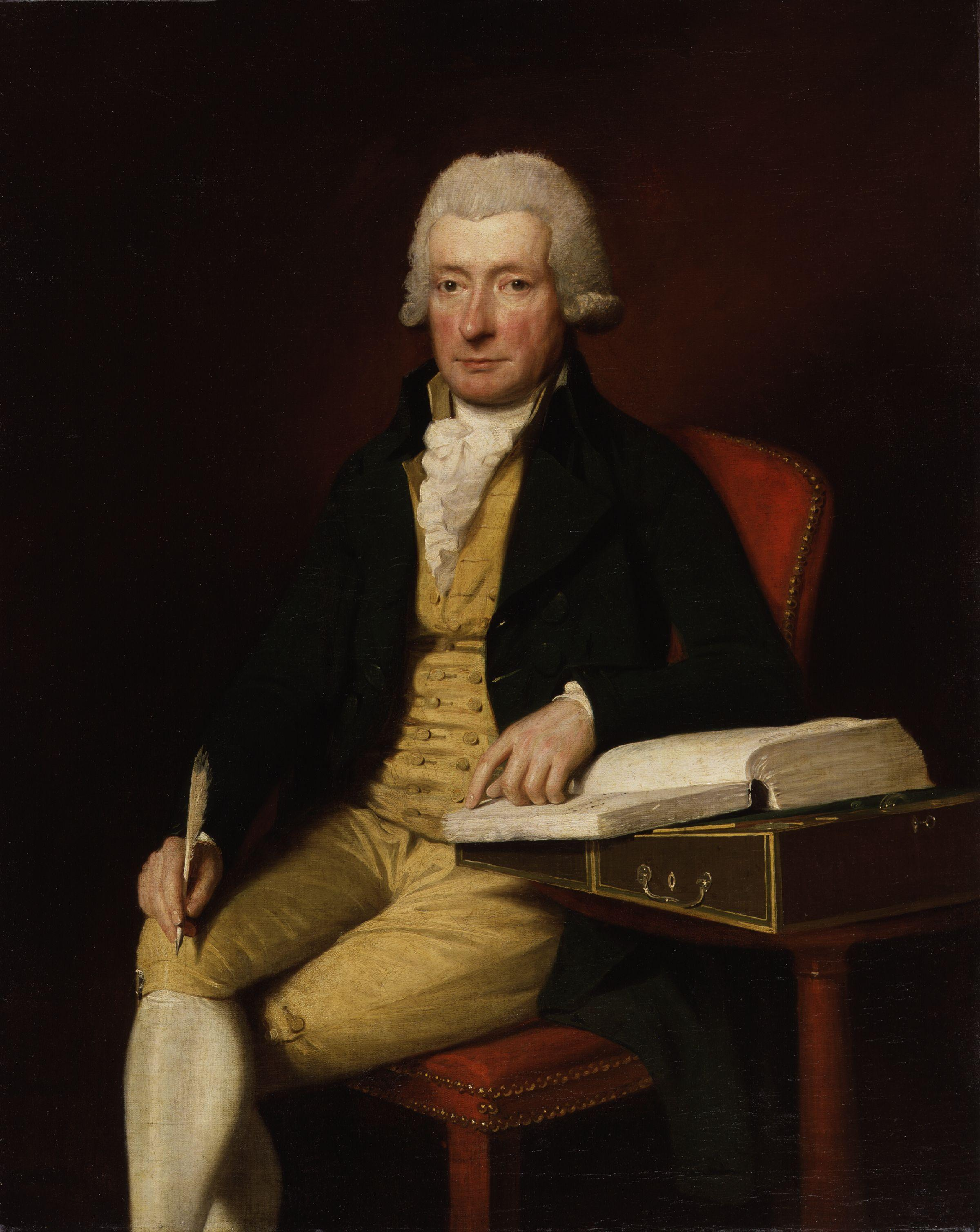
- Portrait by Lemuel Francis Abbott, 1792
- Born: 26 November 1731; Berkhamsted, Hertfordshire, England
- Died: 25 April 1800 (aged 68); East Dereham, Norfolk, England
- Education: Westminster School
- Occupation: Poet

William Cowper (Note: /ˈkuːpər/ KOO-pər, /ˈkaʊ-/ KOW-, /ˈkʊ-/ KUU-) (26 November [O.S. 15 November] 1731 – 25 April 1800) was an English poet and Anglican hymnwriter.

One of the most popular poets of his time, Cowper changed the direction of 18th-century nature poetry by writing of everyday life and scenes of the English countryside. In many ways, he was one of the forerunners of Romantic poetry. Samuel Taylor Coleridge called him "the best modern poet", whilst William Wordsworth particularly admired his poem "Yardley-Oak".

After being institutionalised for insanity, Cowper found refuge in a fervent evangelical Christianity. He continued to suffer doubt about his salvation and, after a dream in 1773, believed that he was doomed to eternal damnation. He recovered, and went on to write more religious hymns.

His religious sentiment and association with John Newton (who wrote the hymn "Amazing Grace") led to much of the poetry for which he is best remembered, and to the series of Olney Hymns. His poem "Light Shining out of Darkness" (1773) gave English the phrase: "God moves in a mysterious way/ His wonders to perform."

He also wrote a number of anti-slavery poems, and his friendship with Newton, who was an avid anti-slavery campaigner, resulted in Cowper's being asked to write in support of the Abolitionist campaign. Cowper wrote a poem called "The Negro's Complaint" (1788) which rapidly became very famous, and was often quoted by Martin Luther King Jr. during the 20th-century civil rights movement. He also wrote several other less well-known poems on slavery in the 1780s, many of which attacked the idea that slavery was economically viable.

Cowper also wrote the poems The Diverting History of John Gilpin (1782) and The Task (1785).

== Early life ==
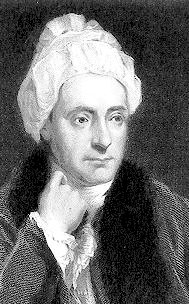
William Cowper

Cowper was born in Berkhamsted, Hertfordshire, where his father John Cowper was rector of the Church of St Peter. His father's sister was the poet Judith Madan. His mother was Ann née Donne. He and his brother John were the only two of seven children to live past infancy. Ann died giving birth to John on 7 November 1737. His mother's death at such an early age troubled William deeply and was the subject of his poem "On the Receipt of My Mother's Picture", written more than fifty years later. He grew close to her family in his early years. He was particularly close with her brother Robert and his wife Harriot. They instilled in young William a love of reading and gave him some of his first books – John Bunyan's Pilgrim's Progress and John Gay's Fables.

Cowper was first enrolled in Westminster School in April 1742 after moving from school to school for a number of years. He had begun to study Latin at a young age, and was an eager scholar of Latin for the rest of his life. Older children bullied Cowper through many of his younger years. At Westminster School he studied under the headmaster John Nicoll. At the time, Westminster School was popular amongst families belonging to England's Whig political party. Many intelligent boys from families of a lower social status also attended, however. Cowper made lifelong friends from Westminster. He read through the Iliad and the Odyssey, which ignited his lifelong scholarship and love for Homer's epics. He grew skilled at the interpretation and translation of Latin, an ability he put to use for the rest of his life. He was skilled in the composition of Latin as well and wrote many verses of his own.

== Career ==
After education at Westminster School, Cowper was articled to Mr Chapman, solicitor, of Ely Place, Holborn, to be trained for a career in law. During this time, he spent his leisure at the home of his uncle Bob Cowper, where he fell in love with his cousin Theodora, whom he wished to marry. But as James Croft, who in 1825 first published the poems Cowper addressed to Theodora, wrote, "her father, from an idea that the union of persons so nearly related was improper, refused to accede to the wishes of his daughter and nephew". This refusal left Cowper distraught. He had his first severe attack of depression/mental illness, referred to at the time as melancholy.

In 1763, he was offered a Clerkship of Journals in the House of Lords, but broke under the strain of the approaching examination; he experienced a worse period of depression and insanity. At this time he tried three times to commit suicide and was sent to Nathaniel Cotton's asylum at St Albans for recovery. His poem beginning "Hatred and vengeance, my eternal portion" (sometimes referred to as "Sapphics") was written in the aftermath of his suicide attempt.

After recovering, he settled at Huntingdon with a retired clergyman named Morley Unwin and his wife Mary. Cowper grew to be on such good terms with the Unwin family that he went to live in their house, and moved with them to Olney. There he met curate John Newton, a former captain of slave ships who had devoted his life to the Christian gospel. Not long afterwards, Morley Unwin was killed in a fall from his horse; Cowper continued to live in the Unwin home and became greatly attached to the widow Mary Unwin.

At Olney, Newton invited Cowper to contribute to a hymnbook that he was compiling. The resulting volume, known as Olney Hymns, was not published until 1779 but includes hymns such as "Praise for the Fountain Opened" (beginning "There is a fountain fill'd with blood") and "Light Shining out of Darkness" (beginning "God Moves in a Mysterious Way"), which remain some of Cowper's most familiar verses. Several of Cowper's hymns, as well as others originally published in the Olney Hymns, are today preserved in the Sacred Harp, which also collects shape note songs.

In 1773, Cowper experienced an attack of insanity, imagining not only that he was eternally condemned to hell, but that God was commanding him to make a sacrifice of his own life. Mary Unwin took care of him with great devotion, and after a year he began to recover. In 1779, after Newton had moved from Olney to London, Cowper started to write poetry again. Mary Unwin, wanting to keep Cowper's mind occupied, suggested that he write on the subject of The Progress of Error. After writing a satire of this name, he wrote seven others. These poems were collected and published in 1782 under the title Poems by William Cowper, of the Inner Temple, Esq.

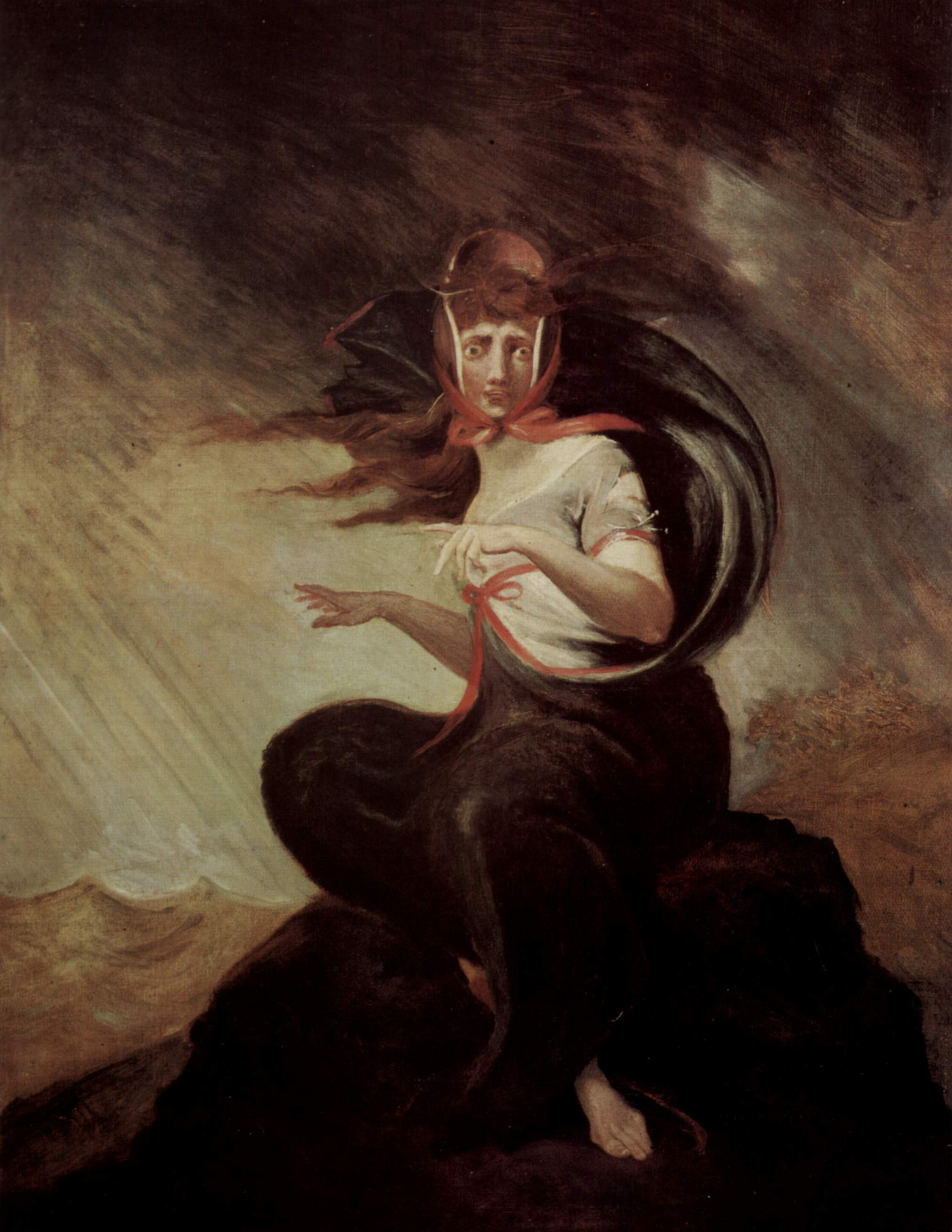
Crazy Kate, illustration for Cowper's The Task by Henry Fuseli (1806–1807).

In 1781, Cowper met a sophisticated and charming widow named Lady Austen, who inspired new poetry. Cowper himself tells of the genesis of what some have considered his most substantial work, The Task, in his "Advertisement" to the original edition of 1785:

...a lady, fond of blank verse, demanded a poem of that kind from the author, and gave him the SOFA for a subject. He obeyed; and, having much leisure, connected another subject with it; and, pursuing the train of thought to which his situation and turn of mind led him, brought forth at length, instead of the trifle which he at first intended, a serious affair – a Volume!

In the same volume Cowper also printed "The Diverting History of John Gilpin", a notable piece of comic verse. G. K. Chesterton, in Orthodoxy, later credited the writing of "John Gilpin" with saving Cowper from becoming completely insane.

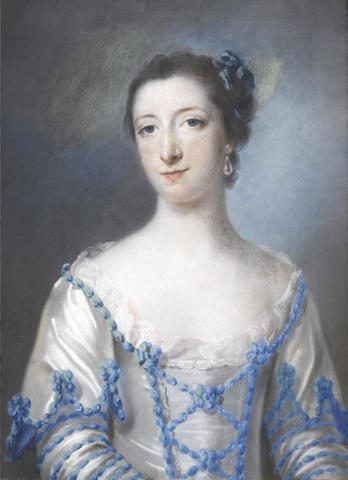
Harriett Hesketh by Francis Coates

Cowper and Mary Unwin moved to Weston Underwood, Buckinghamshire, in 1786, having become close to his cousin Harriett Hesketh (Theodora's sister). During this period he started his translations of Homer's Iliad and Odyssey into blank verse. His versions (published in 1791) were the most significant English renderings of these epic poems since those of Alexander Pope earlier in the century. Later critics have faulted Cowper's Homer for being too much in the mould of John Milton.

In 1789, Cowper befriended a cousin, Dr John Johnson, a Norfolk clergyman, and in 1795 Cowper and Mary moved to Norfolk to be near him and his sister Catharine. They originally stayed at North Tuddenham, then at Dunham Lodge near Swaffham, and then Mundesley before finally settling in East Dereham (all places in Norfolk) with the Johnsons, after Mary Unwin became paralysed.

Mary Unwin died in 1796, plunging Cowper into a gloom from which he never fully recovered. He did continue to revise his Homer for a second edition of his translation. Aside from writing the powerful and bleak poem "The Castaway", he penned some English translations of Greek verse and translated some of the Fables of John Gay into Latin.

== Death and memorials ==
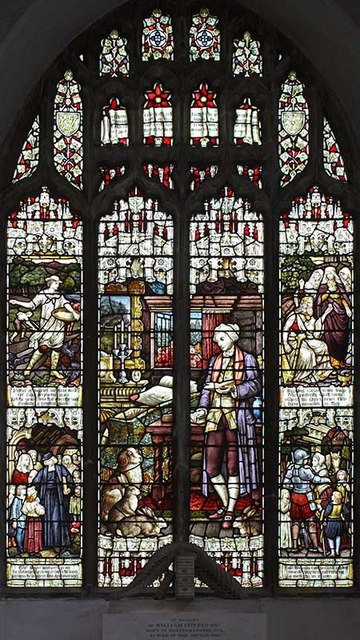
Stained-glass window depicting Cowper in St Nicholas's Church, East Dereham, Norfolk

Cowper was seized with edema, or dropsy, in the spring of 1800 and died on 25 April. He is buried in the chapel of St Thomas of Canterbury, St Nicholas's Church in East Dereham, and a stained-glass window there commemorates his life.

In St Peter's Church in Berkhamsted there are two windows in memory of Cowper: The east window by Clayton & Bell (1872) depicts Cowper at his writing desk accompanied by his pet hares, and bears the inscription "Salvation to the dying man, And to the rising God" (a line from Cowper's poem "The Saviour, what a noble flame"); and in the north aisle, an etched glass window is inscribed with lines from "Oh! for a closer walk with God" and "The Task". In the same church there is also a memorial tablet to the poet's mother, Ann Cowper. Cowper is also commemorated (along with George Herbert) by another Clayton & Bell stained-glass window in St George's Chapel, Westminster Abbey.

In 1823, Cowper's correspondence was published posthumously from the original letters in the possession of his kinsman John Johnson.

Near the village of Weston Underwood, Buckinghamshire, where Cowper once resided, is a folly named Cowper's Alcove. The folly was built by the Lord of the Manor of Weston House, a member of the Throckmorton family, in 1753. Cowper was known to visit there frequently for inspiration for his poetry. The alcove is mentioned in Cowper's "The Task". The folly was dedicated to Cowper by the Buckinghamshire county council green belt estate, and a plaque with the verse from "The Task" referencing the alcove was installed.

== Legacy ==
Some 21st-century Christians, such as John Piper, have interpreted Cowper's life as that of a Christian in a struggle with lifelong depression. He speculates that its roots may have lain in the death of his mother at age six, and the detachment from his father experienced at boarding school.

=== Queerness ===
Modern literary scholar Conrad Brunstrom described Cowper's relationships with women and men at this time as queer and radically anti-heteronormative. "Not only did Cowper refuse a traditional heterosexual role, he also refused many of the attributes attached to those who were supposed to have refused such a role...making him anti-heteronormative and anti-homonormative at one and the same time." Cowper's 18th century understanding of his own predicament was that—being "what the world calls an old bachelor"—he was nevertheless "a rational creature", much abused by those who would make sport of him.

== Selected works ==
=== Poems ===
- The Snail (1770)
- The Winter Nosegay (1777)
- Olney Hymns (1778–1779; in collaboration with John Newton)
- John Gilpin (1782)
- Epitaph on a Hare (1782)
- Poems by William Cowper, of the Inner Temple, Esq. (1782; Cowper's First Independent Volume)
- The Rose (1783)
- The Task (1785)
- The Morning Dream (1788)
- Homer's Iliad and Odyssey (1791; translations from the Greek)
- The Retired Cat (1791)
- To Mary (1793)
- The Castaway (1803)
- The Poplar-Field (1785)
- Lines Written During a Period of Insanity (1816)

=== Translations ===
William Cowper translated Homer's two epic poems: "The Iliad" and "The Odyssey". His translations of these ancient Greek classics are considered significant contributions to English literature. Cowper's translations of Homer were part of a broader movement in the 18th and 19th centuries to make classical literature more accessible to English-speaking audiences. While his translations may not be as widely read today as some others, they were influential in their time and contributed to the ongoing appreciation of Homer's works in English-speaking countries.

=== Hymns ===
Some of Cowper's most famous hymns include:

- Jesus! where'er thy people meet
- The Spirit breathes upon the word
- There is a fountain, filled with blood
- Hark! my soul! it is the Lord
- To Jesus, the Crown of my hope
- Far from the world, O Lord! I flee
- My Lord! how full of sweet content
- What various hindrances we meet
- Oh! for a closer walk with God
- When darkness long has veiled my mind
- 'Tis my happiness below
- O Lord! in sorrow I resign
- O Lord! my best desire fulfill
- God of my life! to thee I call

== Familiar quotations ==
GOD moves in a mysterious way,
His wonders to perform;
He plants his footsteps in the sea,
And rides upon the storm.

"Light Shining out of Darkness", Olney Hymns, 1779

There is a fountain fill'd with blood
Drawn from Emmanuel's veins;
And sinners, plung'd beneath that flood,
Lose all their guilty stains.

"Praise for the Fountain Opened", Olney Hymns, 1779

Oh! for a closer walk with GOD,
A calm and heav'nly frame;
A light to shine upon the road
That leads me to the Lamb!

"Walking with God", Olney Hymns, 1779

God made the country, and man made the town.

"The Sofa", The Task, vol. I, 1785, line 749

There is a pleasure in poetic pains
Which only poets know.

"The Timepiece", The Task, vol. II, 1785, lines 285–286

Variety's the very spice of life,
That gives it all its flavour.

"The Timepiece", The Task, vol. II, 1785, lines 606–607

I am monarch of all I survey,
My right there is none to dispute;
From the centre all round to the sea,
I am lord of the fowl and the brute.

Verses Supposed to be Written by Alexander Selkirk, 1782, lines 1–4

No voice divine the storm allay'd,
No light propitious shone;
When, snatch'd from all effectual aid,
We perish'd, each alone;
But I beneath a rougher sea,
And whelmed in deeper gulphs than he.

The Castaway, 1799, lines 61–66

'Tis pleasant, through the loopholes of retreat,
To peep at such a world; to see the stir
Of the great Babel, and not feel the crowd;
To hear the roar she sends through all her gates
At a safe distance, where the dying sound
Falls a soft murmur on the uninjur'd ear.

"The Winter Evening", The Task, vol. IV, 1785, lines 88–93

== See also ==
- List of abolitionist forerunners
- Frances Maria Cowper

== Sources ==
- Harold Child, "William Cowper", in Ward & Trent, et al. The Cambridge History of English and American Literature. New York: GP Putnam's Sons, 1907–21. As given at Bartleby.com.
- Edwin F. Hatfield, edt., The Church Hymn Book for the Worship of God, New York and Chicago: 1872.
- Hymnology Archive, William Cowper.
- Stephen, Leslie, ed. (1887). "Cowper, William (1731–1800)" . Dictionary of National Biography. Vol. 12. London: Smith, Elder & Co. pp. 394–402.
- H. S. Milford, The Complete Poetical Works of William Cowper. London: Oxford University Press, 1913. ("Chronological Table" on pp. xxiv–xxx heavily utilised for biographical data.)
