= Lutheran liturgical calendar =

Liturgical calendar used by Lutherans

The Lutheran liturgical calendar is a listing which details the primary annual festivals and events that are celebrated liturgically by various Lutheran churches. The calendars of the Evangelical Lutheran Church in America (ELCA) and the Evangelical Lutheran Church in Canada (ELCIC) are from the 1978 Lutheran Book of Worship and the calendar of the Lutheran Church–Missouri Synod (LCMS) and the Lutheran Church–Canada (LCC) use the Lutheran Book of Worship and the 1982 Lutheran Worship. Elements unique to the ELCA have been updated from the Lutheran Book of Worship to reflect changes resulting from the publication of Evangelical Lutheran Worship in 2006. The elements of the calendar unique to the LCMS have also been updated from Lutheran Worship and the Lutheran Book of Worship to reflect the 2006 publication of the Lutheran Service Book.

The basic element to the calendar is the Lord's Day (Sunday), which is a festival of Jesus' resurrection. However, Christian denominations have historically observed other festivals which commemorate events in the life of Jesus or of significant individuals in the history of the Church.

== Structure ==
Lutheran church year and the temperate seasons of the Earth's Northern Hemisphere

The Lutheran calendar operates on two different cycles: the Temporal Cycle and the Sanctoral Cycle. The Temporal Cycle pivots on the festivals of Christmas and Easter. All Sundays, Seasons, and Festivals are related to these festivals. Because Easter varies in date each year based on the vernal equinox and the phases of the moon, it is called a moveable feast (see: Computus). Dates affected by placement of Easter include Ash Wednesday and the start of Lent, the start of Easter itself, Pentecost, and Holy Trinity. Advent, the other pivotal season on the calendar, comes exactly four Sundays before the start of Christmas (if Christmas falls on a Sunday, that day does not count), or the Sunday closest to St. Andrew's Day (November 30). Like the other Western Church calendars, the first Sunday of Advent is also the first day of the liturgical year. The Sanctoral Cycle is the fixed daily commemorations of individuals and events not related to the Temporal Cycle of Sundays, Festivals, and Seasons.

=== Festivals ===
The Festivals are Nativity, Epiphany, the Baptism of our Lord, the Transfiguration, the Annunciation, Palm Sunday, Easter, the Ascension, Pentecost, Holy Trinity, All Saints, and Christ the King. Most of these festivals are tied to the moveable feast of Easter. Festivals take precedence over all other days, including Sundays, have their own collects and Eucharistic proper prefaces. Of the festivals, Christmas is considered to be twelve days in length (from December 25 until January 5) and Easter is fifty days in length (from Easter Sunday up to and inclusive of Pentecost). For Easter, Sundays are considered to be another part of the festival. For the Ascension which, falling on fortieth day of Easter, will always be on a Thursday, the festival is sometimes transferred to the Seventh Sunday of Easter in addition to or in place of the normal part of the Easter festival for that day.

There is another type of day which, while not a festival, is considered to be equal with a festival. These days, called Days of Special Devotion, are Ash Wednesday and all the days of Holy Week, especially Good Friday. These particular days, like other festivals, automatically take precedence over any event on the calendar and sometimes even over other festivals. A good example of this would be in 2005 when Good Friday and the Annunciation fell on the same day (March 25). The Annunciation was transferred to March 28, or the second day of Easter, to make room for Good Friday. The principle of the Church of Sweden is that the Annunciation is celebrated on the Sunday between 21 and 27 March; although, should Good Friday or any other day of Holy Week, or Easter Sunday or Monday respectively, fall on 25 March, Annunciation is moved to the Sunday before Palm Sunday. (For instance, in 2003 Annunciation was celebrated on 13 March; 2008 (when Easter Sunday was 23 March) it was celebrated on 9 March.) One unique feature of the ELCA calendar is that it has given congregations the options of two dates for the Transfiguration.

=== Lesser Festivals ===
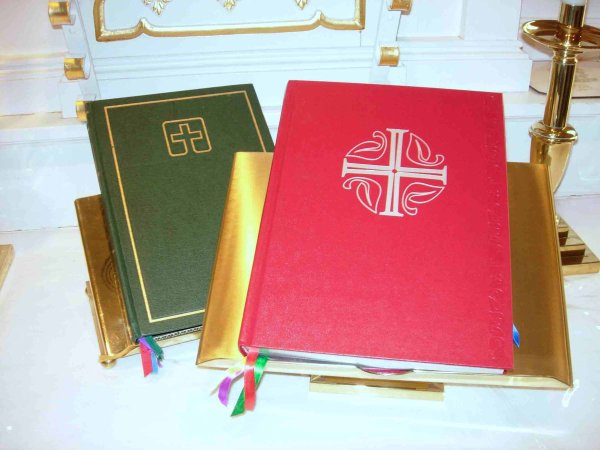
The altar book editions of the Lutheran Book of Worship (green) and Evangelical Lutheran Worship

These are days which are associated with the life of Christ or the Apostles and deserve attention in their own right. Lesser Festivals do not have priority over festivals and technically do not have precedence over ordinary Sundays. However, the Lutheran Book of Worship does permit the celebration of a Lesser Festival on Sundays where the normal color of the day would be green (that is, seasons after Epiphany or after Pentecost) or on the Sundays in Christmas. This is abrogated for patronal festivals (that is, the day commemorating the saint or event for which a congregation is named) provided that they do not take place in Lent, Advent, or Easter, in which case they must also be transferred to the next convenient weekday.

=== Commemorations ===
Commemorations are for individuals or events which have been noteworthy in the life of the Church and in the history of Lutheranism in particular. These days do not take precedence over any other festival day, and if there is a conflict between a commemoration and a festival of any other rank, the commemoration is generally transferred to the next open weekday. If a commemoration falls on a Sunday where the color of the day is green, the collect for which that individual or event belong to could be said before the daily collect/prayer of the day or in place of it. For example, if September 13 fell on a Sunday and there was a desire to commemorate St. John Chrysostom, the pastor would recite the common of theologians and then the prayer of the day or the common of theologians on its own. The person may also be mentioned by name in the prayers of the faithful in addition to recitation of the applicable collect. Finally, their lives might be summarized or their teachings related to the day's lessons in some way.

In cases of conflict between commemorations (for example, November 11 with St. Martin of Tours and Søren Kierkegaard), there is no order of precedence, and individual worship planners need to choose which commemoration, if any, to highlight. In some cases, several individuals are listed together (June 14 with St. Basil the Great, St. Gregory the Theologian, and St. Gregory of Nyssa) because of their close association with each other, and they are thus designed to be commemorated jointly, not as a choice between one or the other.

The schedule of commemorations within the ELCA has been specifically designed so that there is at least one person on the calendar from each century so as to emphasize the continuity of Christian tradition. Clearly, some centuries have more commemorations than others, the largest number of persons commemorated being in the first four centuries of Christian history and immediately following the Reformation. This leaves the space from the 5th to the 15th centuries and the 16th to the 20th centuries rather sparse; nevertheless, it is an improvement over some calendars wherein only a very few persons, all from the patristic or Reformation periods, were commemorated.

== Liturgical colors ==
A Lutheran pastor celebrating the Eucharist during the Easter season

The service books of Lutheran Churches designate specific colors for events which are listed on the liturgical calendars and the seasons which are a part of the Temporal Cycle. This color is sometimes known as “the color of the day.” The Lutheran Church generally follows the color scheme which is used by other churches in Western Christianity since Lutheranism has historically been linked with the Roman Catholic Church. The color of the day dictates the color of the vestments for all ministers and the color of paraments. White is the color designated for Festivals of Christ, with gold sometimes offered as an alternative for the first days of Easter.

White is also used as the color for anyone commemorated on the calendar who was not martyred and is the color appointed for funerals regardless of whatever the color of the day might otherwise be. Purple is commonly used for the season of Lent. It is also optional for use during Advent, though blue is the preferred color for this season because of its hopeful connotations rather than the penitential character implied by purple and its association with Lent.

== Historical development ==
Liturgical calendars began to be developed in Christianity around the fourth century, with the church calendar as it is known today coming into full development in the period of the medieval sacramentaries. While Sunday had long been established in the weekly calendar, festivals such as Easter and Christmas were also a fixed part of the calendar by this time. The ninth century also saw the inclusion of numerous saints in the calendar (a practice already begun by the second century), even to the point that normal Sunday propers were taking place over those normally appointed for Sunday.

=== Reformation era ===
All of the Reformers attempted to reduce the number of individual commemorations and “saint’s days”, though this reduction was sometimes more drastic than others. In the case of the Lutheran churches, most of the saints' days were removed (with the exception of some New Testament personages), though the basic temporal cycle of the calendar remained more or less intact. In some instances, a celebration of the Reformation was added to October 31, the first instance being the church order prepared by Johannes Bugenhagen, though other churches selected alternative dates, including June 25, the anniversary of the presentation of the Augsburg Confession. The commemoration of the Reformation quickly died out before the Thirty Years War.

==== In Germany ====
The content of the liturgical calendar (like the content of the liturgy itself) was the responsibility of territory in which the church was found. Thus, there was a different order for Saxony, one for Prussia, one for Hesse, and one for Wittenberg, among others. Despite their differences, the calendars and liturgies maintained significant similarities between each other as well as the calendar of the Roman Catholic Church. The church year continued to begin with the First Sunday of Advent (which was still fixed based on the traditional formula), and many of the festivals surrounding Christmas (St. Stephen, St. John, the Holy Innocents) remained in place, even if they were often ignored. Epiphany also continued to be celebrated as the visit of the Magi, though Martin Luther preferred to commemorate the baptism of Christ.

Brandenburg and Calenburg and Göttingen retained Lent and the fasting days associated with the season. They also retained the violet or black vestments for the penitential season. However, popular devotions such as the blessing of palms or the imposition of ashes were suppressed in most church orders, despite the fact that a number of them had retained Ash Wednesday as the start of Lent. Good Friday, while kept with solemnity, was often a celebration of Holy Communion, thus less somber than the contemporary Roman Catholic Church. And while Easter had been a common day of communion in the church before the reformation, “the reformers tried to prevent too many communions on this day, and instead urged the faithful to receive it on various Sundays throughout the year.” The Reformation also saw the development of a new “festival” connected to Easter, where the second Sunday became popularly known as “Good Shepherd Sunday” based on the opening of the psalm appointed for the day, Misericordia domini or “Goodness of the Lord”. In addition, Corpus Christi was commonly retained until about 1600, owing to its significant popularity in the Medieval period.

While many saints were removed from liturgical calendars by the reformers, some were nevertheless retained. St. Ansgar was commemorated in Halberstadt and Nordligen with a special thanksgiving service on the Sunday after 3 February, no doubt because of the saint's historic connection to the area. The same was true of Elizabeth of Thuringia in the Schweinfurth Order, and St. George was also commemorated in Nordlingen. Festivals of the apostles and evangelists were also found on Lutheran calendars of the era, but were not always observed if they fell on a day other than Sunday. Some of the Marian festivals, notably the Nativity of Mary (September 8) and her Assumption (August 15) were retained by Luther whereas the feasts of her conception and presentation in the Temple were suppressed “because they were judged to have no scriptural or dogmatic interest.”

==== In Scandinavian countries ====
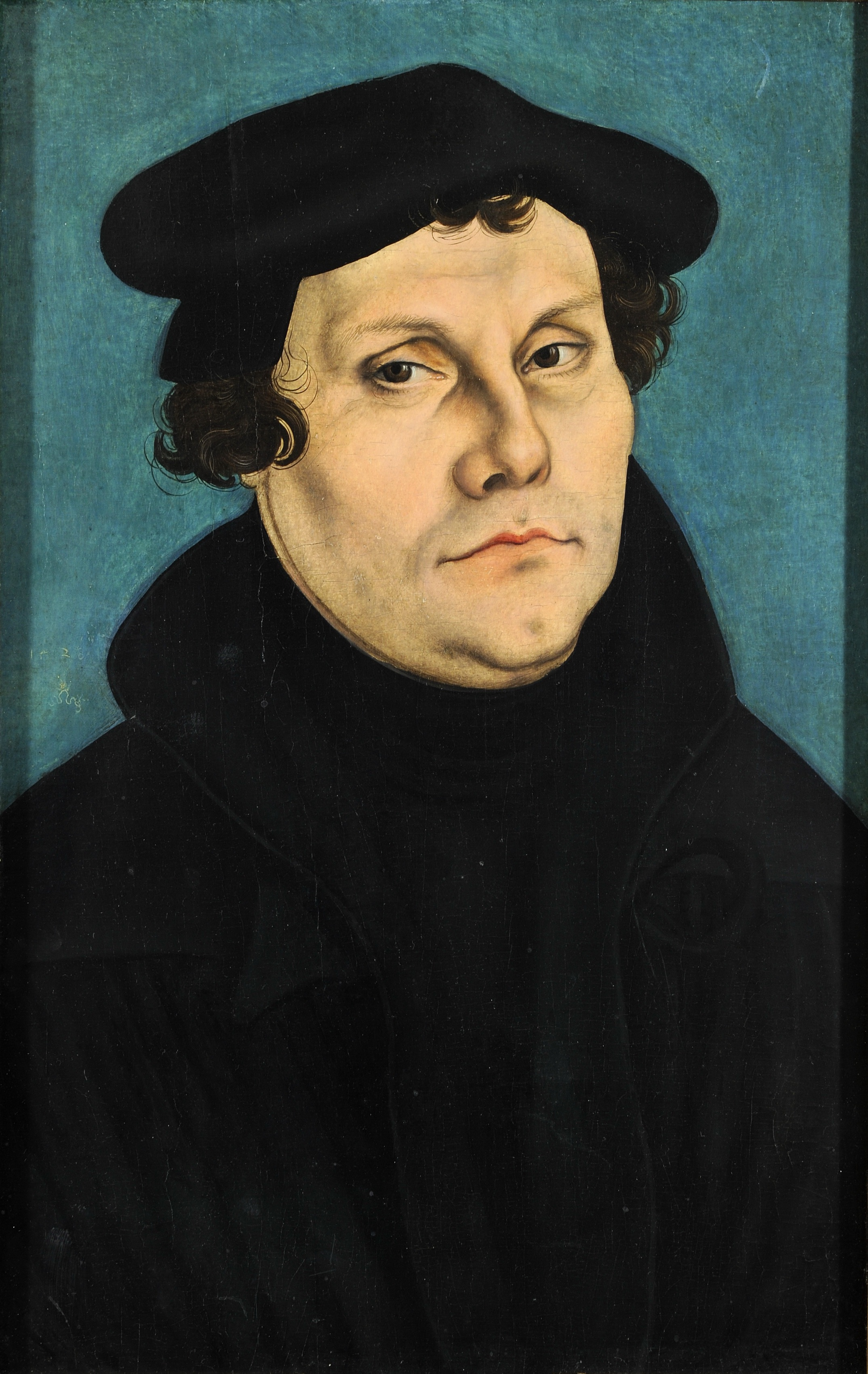
Martin Luther, commemorated on February 18

When the Lutheran Reformation was brought to Sweden from Germany via Denmark after the election of Gustav Vasa in 1523, the movement from the start had its own distinct characteristics. The development of Swedish liturgy was, in part, thanks to Olavus Petri, which is sometimes regarded as his most important work. His Swedish Mass, 1531 remained in use, with only slight modifications, until the twentieth century. The Swedish Mass draws from a number of different sources, though Luther's Formulae Missae is apparent in regards to the Eucharistic structure.

Changes included revising the calendar along similar lines as those in Germany. Laurentius Petri further revised the Swedish Mass 1557. In large part, the Swedish liturgy retained “vestments, altars and frontals, gold and silver chalices and patens” and many other “popish” customs. Following Laurentius’ death in 1573, King John III embarked on a separate, though similar, religious policy more conciliatory towards Catholicism. Much of his work was in the area of liturgy and his Nova Ordinantia reinstated much of the sanctoral cycle from the Old Swedish Mass, reviving the feasts of St. Mary Magdalene, St. Lawrence, Corpus Christi, and the Assumption and Nativity of the Virgin Mary.

=== Modern era ===
The majority of calendars between the start of the Reformation and the 20th century were quite minimal in their commemorations. Most included events such as the Annunciation or persons such as Saint Paul, these days often went unobserved despite scrupulous attention to the temporal cycle. Even further, the commemoration of some biblical persons of note (including the Virgin Mary) were often omitted entirely.

==== Calendar in Europe ====
Many of the changes to the calendar that had accompanied the Reformation remained in place during the subsequent centuries. In Saxony in the eighteenth century, in addition to chief festivals of Christmas, Easter, and Pentecost, a number of festivals were also celebrated with Vespers and Holy Communion, including Saint Stephen, Saint John, the Circumcision, Epiphany, Purification of Mary, the Annunciation, the Ascension, Holy Trinity, Nativity of Saint John the Baptist, the Visitation (on July 2), and Saint Michael (on September 29). When Holy Communion was celebrated, a chasuble was used in the color of the day, though especially at Leipzig, these colors were different from the ones normally used today. In the twentieth century, Lutherans in Europe came under the influence of the Liturgical Movement and many Lutheran churches adopted new calendars and rubrics similar to the Roman Calendar as revised by Vatican II.

==== The calendar in North America ====
When Lutherans came to North America, they brought with them their disparate liturgical traditions. The Pennsylvania Ministerium composed the first liturgy for North America, including its calendar along somewhat minimal lines. However, since the last quarter of the nineteenth century, the calendar within North American Lutheran churches has been expanding. In 1868, four chief festivals in the Church Book were Christmas, New Year's Day, Epiphany, and Reformation Day, with Easter and Pentecost being considered a separate category because they invariably fell on Sunday. The Church Book also included several minor festivals, including festivals for all the Apostles, and the Annunciation. The Common Service Book (1918) also expanded the calendar to help congregations determine which days took priority over others in cases of coincidence. It added to the calendar the Sundays of Advent, Transfiguration (last Sunday after Epiphany), Septuagesima, Sexagesima, Quinquagesima, Ash Wednesday, Sundays in Lent, all days in Holy Week, Ascension and the following Sunday, and Holy Trinity. It also included All Saints, and Saints Mark and Luke, both of which were omitted from the Church Book. The Service Book and Hymnal (1941) also moved the Transfiguration to August 6 and added Holy Innocents to the calendar.

The previous North American calendar of the ELCA was different from its European counterparts in that it does not give equal weight (and sometimes gives no mention) to persons who may be commemorated in Scandinavian regions. One example would be the absence of St. Lucia on December 13, although she enjoys particular popularity in Sweden. But Lutheran calendars also differ amongst one another in North America, with some individuals commemorated on multiple calendars but on different days (e.g., St. Bernard of Clairvaux on August 19 in the LCMS and August 20 in the ELCA) or individuals commemorated on one calendar and not the other (e.g., Martin Luther King Jr. on January 15 (his birthday) for the ELCA and C. F. W. Walther on May 7 for the LCMS); with the 2006 publication of Evangelical Lutheran Worship (ELW) as a replacement to the Lutheran Book of Worship (LBW), some of these differences in the ELCA calendar have been corrected. Within the ELCA, This Far by Faith and Libro de Liturgia y Cantico both prescribe calendars with additional commemorations specific to the ethnic communities they were intended to be used in (African Americans and Latinos respectively). The Wisconsin Evangelical Lutheran Synod has a different, somewhat minimized calendar when compared the LCMS and especially the ELCA.

== Differences from other calendars ==
First, the Lutheran calendar, while commemorating many of the same events or persons, often does so on different days from either calendar (St. Cyprian of Carthage on September 16 for Lutherans, but September 13 in the Episcopal Church). In other cases (such as St. Valentine on February 14), individuals who have long standing within Western Christianity are not mentioned in the Lutheran calendar, or are only mentioned in the calendars of some Lutheran churches. Furthermore, some Lutheran calendars (such as that of the LCMS) still venerate individuals whose commemorations have been suppressed in other Western Churches. Finally, the Lutheran calendar commemorates persons or events (such as the presentation of the Augsburg Confession on June 25) which are not commemorated in any other Christian calendar because of their specific importance to the Lutheran Church.

The other significant difference is that the Lutheran calendar commemorates a wider variety of individuals than does either of its counterparts. Included on the calendar are musicians and artists who are associated with the Church, but are not typically thought of as “saints” in the classical sense. The intent is to provide a wider venue for commemoration of outstanding individuals who have served the Church through their vocations rather than simply commemorating the outstanding among the religious.

The calendar for the ELCA is similar to many other Western Calendars in that it does not commemorate any persons from the Old Testament. The calendars of the Orthodox Churches have Old Testament individuals, and the Lutheran Church–Missouri Synod has done the same. At one point there was a proposal to include a day on the Episcopal Church calendar (which was taken into consideration by the Inter-Lutheran Commission on Worship in developing the Lutheran Book of Worship) for Old Testament saints following the octave of All Saints (November 8), but this idea was ultimately rejected as tokenism.

== Saints in the liturgical calendar ==
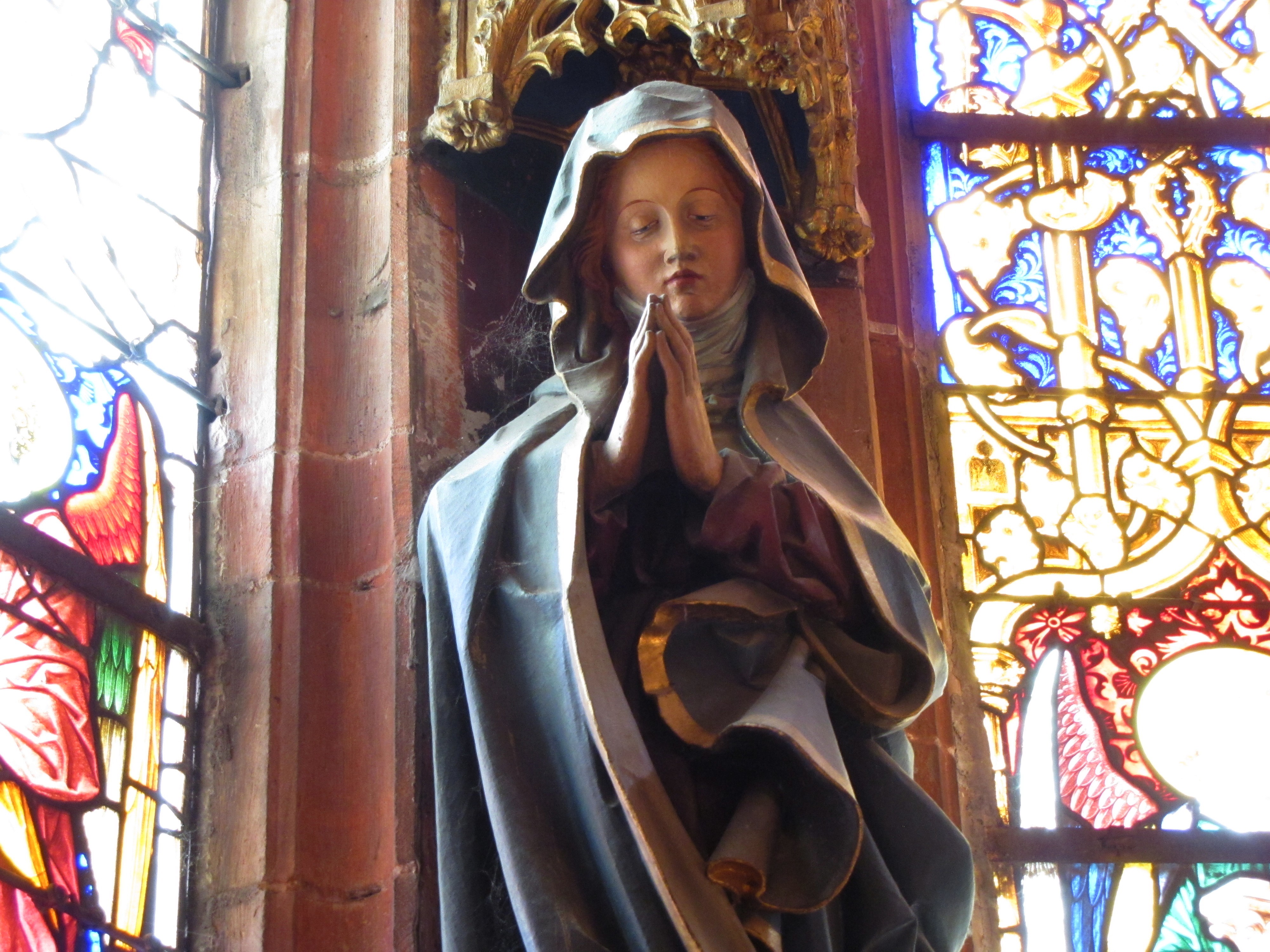
A statue of the Blessed Virgin Mary in the Lutheran Church of Saint-Pierre-le-Jeune, Strasbourg

The Evangelical Lutheran liturgical calendar commemorates various saints, understanding that "there is great benefit in remembering the saints whom God has given to the Church." While certain saints days are ranked as principal festivals (e.g. Feast of St Mary), other saints days are ranked as lesser festivals.

The Apology of the Augsburg Confession (Article 21) lists three reasons for such honor [of the saints]. First, we thank God for giving faithful servants to His Church. Second, through such remembrance our faith is strengthened as we see the mercy that God extended to His saints of old. Third, these saints are examples both of faith and of holy living to imitate according to our calling in life. —Commemorations, Lutheran Church—Missouri Synod

Certain Lutheran liturgical calendars list with the title "saint": Old Testament prophets (e.g. St. Noah), New Testament figures (e.g. St. Mark), saints from the pre-Reformation era (e.g. St. Lucia), and Lutheran divines (e.g. St. Martin Chemnitz). In others, the title of "saint" is reserved for biblical persons, rather than to other persons listed on the calendar. This is to prevent oddities of convention (such as St. Nicolaus Copernicus). Individuals who typically have "saint" affixed to their given name are still referred to as such in common discourse (so that Francis of Assisi would still be called "St. Francis" rather than just "Francis").

In the New Testament, all Christians are referred to as saints. However, the use of "saint" as a title for an individual who had led a good and exemplary life or who had been martyred began to develop in Christianity. By the time of the Reformation, the use of "saint" was almost exclusively the restrictive, titular sense. One of the effects of the Reformation was to eliminate the abuses of the cult of saints, and as a result, it is a common misconception that Lutherans do not have (or rather, do not venerate) saints. However, the confessional documents of the Lutheran Church, particularly the Augsburg Confession, accept both the general and particular use of the word saints. With regard to the titular sense, the Augsburg Confession commends that "it should be taught among us that saints should be kept in remembrance so that our faith may be strengthened when we see what grace they received and how they were sustained in faith. Moreover, their good works are to be an example for us, each of us in his own calling." Article XXI of The Apology to the Augsburg Confession goes further to describe three types of honor which are due to the saints and acknowledgment that the saints pray for the Church. However, the Augsburg Confession opposes invocation of saints, stating, "Scripture does not teach calling on the saints or pleading for help from them. For it sets before us Christ alone as mediator, atoning sacrifice, high priest, and intercessor." It does affirm the intercession of saints, that the saints "pray for the Church universal in general" in life and in heaven.

== See also ==
- Calendar of saints (Lutheran)
- For calendars besides the Lutheran calendar, see:

- Calendar of saints (Anglican)
- Calendar of saints (Roman Catholic)
- Calendar of saints (Eastern Orthodox).
