= Christian Worship: A Lutheran Hymnal =

Hymnal of the Wisconsin Evangelical Lutheran Synod

- Christian Worship
- The pew edition of Christian Worship
- Commissioned by: Wisconsin Evangelical Lutheran Synod
- Released: 1993
- Publisher: Northwestern Publishing House
- No. of Hymns: 623
← The Lutheran Hymnal	Christian Worship: Hymnal →

Christian Worship: A Lutheran Hymnal (CW) is a hymnal of the Wisconsin Evangelical Lutheran Synod (WELS) published in 1993. It was prepared by the WELS Commission on Worship and published by Northwestern Publishing House, the official publisher of the WELS.

Christian Worship was intended to succeed The Lutheran Hymnal (TLH) as the common hymnal of the WELS. In 2008, the Christian Worship Supplement (CWS) was released, containing several new orders of service, psalms, and hymns. A successor was published in 2021 titled Christian Worship: Hymnal.

== History ==
After using The Lutheran Hymnal for a little over a decade, the Missouri Synod invited the WELS to join them in producing a revised version in 1953; however, the Missouri Synod abandoned this project in 1965. The Missouri Synod instead later published Lutheran Worship, after withdrawing from the intersynodical collaboration that produced the Lutheran Book of Worship. During a synod convention in 1983, the WELS approved the creation of a new hymnal, leading to the formation of the WELS Commission on Worship and beginning of work on the new hymnal in 1984. The hymnal, containing 623 hymns, was published in 1993.

== Editions ==
In addition to the pew edition, several other editions of CW are available:

- Liturgy books
  - Christian Worship: Altar Book
  - Christian Worship: Occasional Services
  - Christian Worship New Service Settings
  - Verse of the Day Complete Set
- Accompaniment editions
  - Christian Worship: Accompaniment for Liturgy and Psalms
  - Christian Worship: Occasional Services Accompaniment for Liturgy and Psalms
  - Psalms for Worship: Accompaniment Edition
  - Christian Worship Accompaniment for Hymns
  - CW Alternative Accompaniments
  - Christian Worship New Service Settings Accompaniment
  - Christian Worship Supplement: Accompaniment
  - Christian Worship: Supplement - Guitar
- Electronic Editions
  - Christian Worship Electronic Edition
  - Christian Worship Supplement Electronic Edition
  - Christian Worship Occasional Services Electronic Edition
  - Christian Worship New Service Settings Electronic Edition
- Lectionaries
  - Planning Christian Worship Series A
  - Planning Christian Worship Series B
  - Planning Christian Worship Series C
  - Christian Worship Supplement Supplemental Lectionary
- Christian Worship Handbook
- Christian Worship Manual
- Pastor's Companion
- Christian Worship: Large Print Edition

== HymnSoft ==
In addition to the accompaniment editions of the hymnal, NPH offers an edition of Christian Worship known as HymnSoft. This computer program is structured in order to allow churches without pianists and organists to easily play hymns, psalms, and liturgy using a computer. Playback is in MIDI and can use the computer's own on-board midi synthesizer with internal or external speakers, or can be connected to a MIDI capable keyboard, piano, or organ. External MIDI files can be added using the Player Module, which can execute scripts for an entire service. The Planning Christian Worship materials also has its own module for Hymnsoft.

As of March 2018, Hymnsoft version 3.2 is the current version of the software. It includes recordings of all music, hymns, and psalms in the Christian Worship hymnal, Christian Worship Supplement, and Christian Worship Occasional Services.

== Christian Worship: Supplement ==
After Christian Worship was published, the WELS decided that a hymnal should serve for 25-30 years, unlike the 52 years served by TLH. In 2003, the WELS began work on Christian Worship: Supplement. It was published in 2008, 15 years after Christian Worship, and contains 88 hymns numbered from 701 to 788. The hymnal was intended to be used alongside Christian Worship, providing a newer and broader range of hymns, psalms, and liturgical materials. It was also used to gain feedback for the next hymnal, which would eventually replace Christian Worship.

== Replacement ==
The WELS in convention authorized the formation of a committee to plan a new hymnal that was released in 2021 (28 years after Christian Worship). Further information of this new hymnal (similarly titled Christian Worship: Hymnal) is available at https://www.christianworship.com/.

== See also ==
- List of English-language hymnals by denomination
