= Mitten wir im Leben sind =

Lutheran hymn

- Hymn by Martin Luther
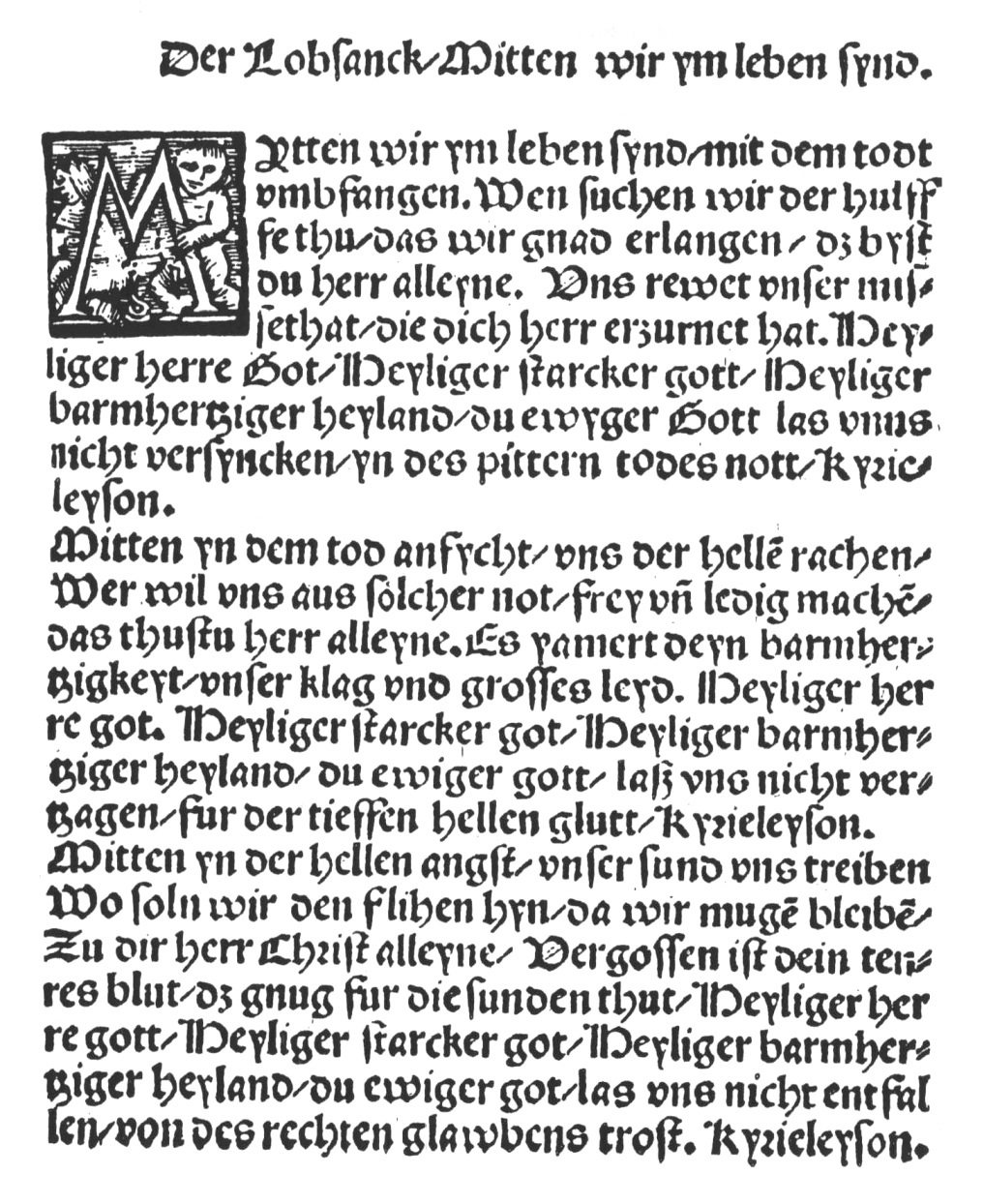
- Luther's hymn in three stanzas in the Erfurt Enchiridion (1524)
- English: In the Midst of Life we are in Death
- Text: by Martin Luther
- Language: German
- Based on: "Media vita in morte sumus"
- Published: 1524
- EG 518

"Mitten wir im Leben sind mit dem Tod umfangen" ("In the Midst of Life we are in Death") is a Lutheran hymn, with words written by Martin Luther based on the Latin antiphon "Media vita in morte sumus". The hymn in three stanzas was first published in 1524. The hymn inspired composers from the Renaissance to contemporary to write chorale preludes and vocal compositions. Catherine Winkworth translated Luther's song to English in 1862. It has appeared in hymnals of various denominations.

== History ==
The Latin antiphon "Media vita in morte sumus" dates back to the 11th century. A German version appeared in Salzburg in 1456. Martin Luther added in 1524 two stanzas following the same scheme. The hymn appeared first that year in Eyn geystlich Gesangk Buchleyn, (booklet of spiritual song), collected by Johann Walter with a melody that Walter adapted from the antiphon. The same year it appeared also in Eyn Enchiridion in Erfurt, titled "Der Lobsanck / Mitten wir ym leben synd." (The song of praise /).

Catherine Winkworth translated Luthers hymn to English in 1862, titled "In the Midst of Life". A translation titled "In the Very Midst of Life" appeared in 1941 in The Lutheran Hymnal. It has appeared in hymnals of various denominations. The song is part of the Protestant hymnal Evangelisches Gesangbuch as EG 518. The first stanza is included in the Catholic hymnal Gotteslob as GL 503. As of 2023, an English translation entitled "In the Midst of Earthly Life" was included in the Wisconsin Synod hymnal.

== Text ==
The Latin text has ten lines of different length, with irregular meter. Lines 7 to 9 are reminiscent of the Trisagion, "Sanctus deus, Sanctus fortis, Sanctus immortalis, miserere nobis" (Holy God, Holy Strong One, Holy Immortal One, have mercy on us).

When Luther added two stanzas, he kept the structure, rendering the final request for mercy in each stanza as the Greek "Kyrieleis". From stanza to stanza, a line explains the respective line in the previous stanza, leading from death in the midst of life to hell in the midst of death, in the third stanza to sin as the reason for fear of hell. Biblical sources for Luther's stanzas are Romans 14:7–8, 1 Corinthians 1:9–10 and 1 Corinthians 15:53–54.

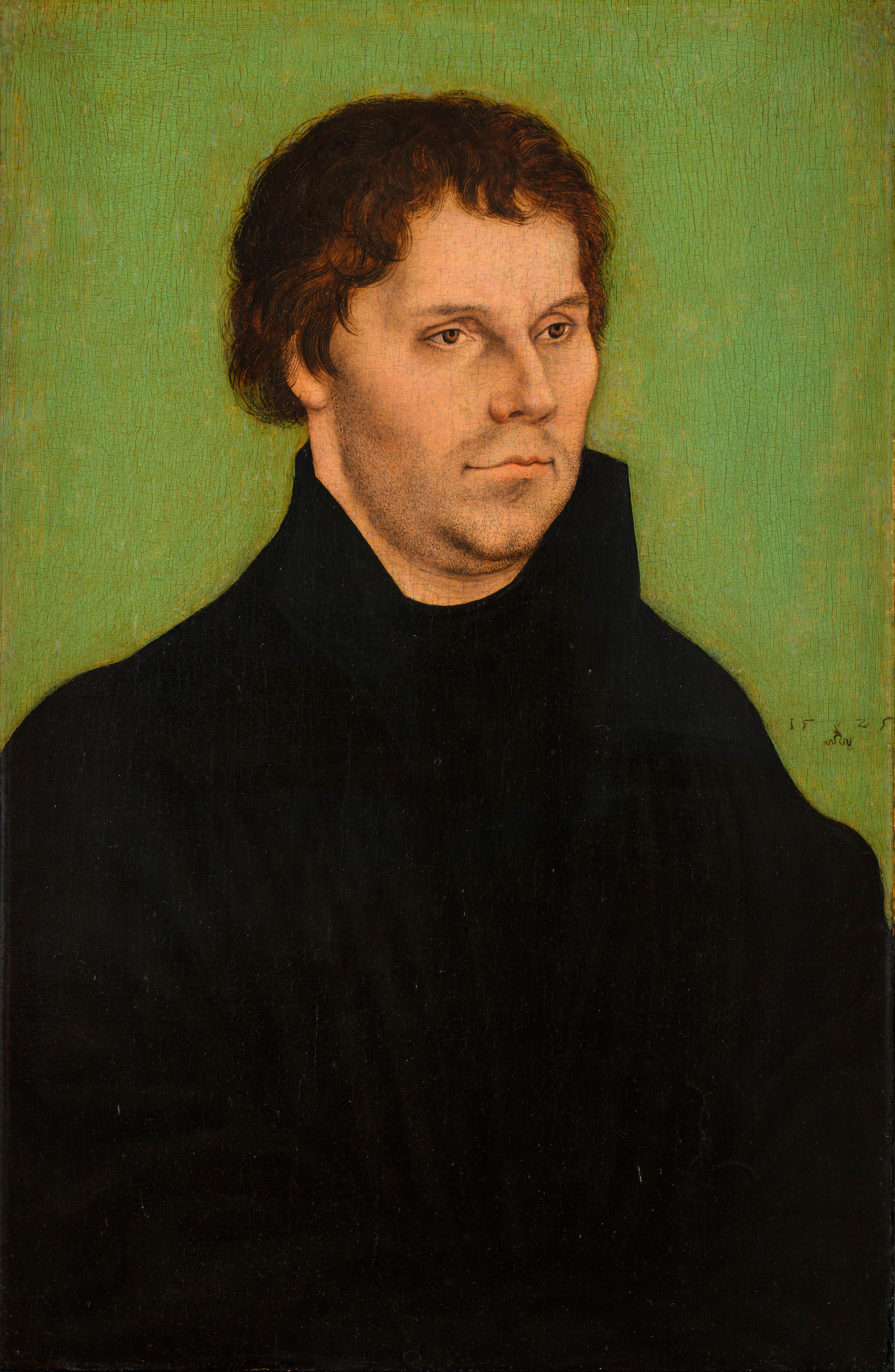
Martin Luther, the author of two stanzas, portrayed by Lucas Cranach, 1525

The lyrics are given in today's form, with the Latin original corresponding to the first stanza:

German
Latin

(1) Mitten wir im Leben sind
mit dem Tod umfangen.
Wer ist, der uns Hilfe bringt,
dass wir Gnad erlangen?
Das bist du, Herr, alleine.
Uns reuet unsre Missetat,
die dich, Herr, erzürnet hat.

Heiliger Herre Gott,
heiliger starker Gott,
heiliger barmherziger Heiland,
du ewiger Gott:
lass uns nicht versinken
in des bittern Todes Not.
Kyrie eleison.

Media vita
In morte sumus.
Quem quærimus adiutorem

Nisi te, Domine,
Qui pro peccatis nostris
Iuste irasceris.

Sancte Deus,
Sancte fortis,
Sancte et misericors Salvator:

Amaræ morti ne tradas nos!

(2) Mitten in dem Tod anficht
uns der Hölle Rachen.
Wer will uns aus solcher Not
frei und ledig machen?
Das tust du, Herr, alleine.
Es jammert dein Barmherzigkeit
unsre Klag und großes Leid.

Heiliger Herre Gott,
heiliger starker Gott,
heiliger barmherziger Heiland,
du ewiger Gott:
lass uns nicht verzagen
vor der tiefen Hölle Glut.
Kyrie eleison.

(3) Mitten in der Hölle Angst
unsre Sünd’ uns treiben.
Wo solln wir denn fliehen hin,
da wir mögen bleiben?
Zu dir, Herr Christ, alleine.
Vergossen ist dein teures Blut,
das g’nug für die Sünde tut.

Heiliger Herre Gott,
heiliger starker Gott,
heiliger barmherziger Heiland,
du ewiger Gott:
lass uns nicht entfallen
von des rechten Glaubens Trost.
Kyrie eleison.

== Melody and setting ==
The melody printed in the Wittenberg is based on the earlier one, adapted by Johann Walter.

J. S. Bach composed a four-part chorale harmonization, BWV 383.

Felix Mendelssohn composed an SSAATTBB motet a cappella as the third and final part of his Kirchenmusik, Op. 23.

Enjott Schneider wrote in 2015 a piece for organ and percussion, called Media vita – Mitten wir im Leben sind.

== See also ==
- List of hymns by Martin Luther
