= Richard Hillert =

American composer

- Born: March 14, 1923; Granton, Wisconsin
- Died: February 18, 2010 (aged 86); Melrose Park, Illinois, U.S.
- Spouse: Gloria (Bonnin) Hillert

Academic background
- Education: Concordia University Chicago, Northwestern University

Academic work
- Discipline: Music
- Sub-discipline: Composition, Church Music, Liturgical music
- Institutions: Concordia University Chicago
- Notable works: “Setting One for Holy Communion," Lutheran Book of Worship (1978)

Richard Hillert (1923-2010) was a noted Lutheran composer. He was Distinguished Professor of Music Emeritus at Concordia University Chicago, River Forest, Ill. He was best known for his work as a composer and teacher of composition. Among his most frequently performed liturgical works for congregation is Worthy Is Christ, with its antiphon, “This is the Feast of Victory” which was written as an alternate Song of Praise for inclusion in Setting One of the Holy Communion in Lutheran Book of Worship (1978) and Lutheran Worship (1982). "This is the Feast" is now widely published in more than 20 recent worship books of many denominations, most recently in Lutheran Service Book (2006) and Evangelical Lutheran Worship (2006). Other major liturgical works include a setting of Evening Prayer (1984) and a Eucharistic Festival Liturgy (1983), which was first performed at Holy Name Cathedral in Chicago. He wrote liturgical pieces and hymns and served as music editor for Worship Supplement (1969) and Lutheran Book of Worship (1978). His compositions and publications include an array of pieces of liturgical music for congregation, choral motets, hymns and hymn anthems, psalm settings and organ works, concertatos, and cantatas, including settings of The Christmas Story According to Saint Luke and The Passion According to Saint John. He edited eleven volumes of the Concordia Hymn Prelude Series.

Hillert's career as Professor of Music at Concordia (now Concordia University Chicago) spanned four decades, from 1959 to 1993. During this time he taught classes in music theory and composition, music literature, 20th-century music, orchestration, keyboard instruction, comparative arts and liturgical worship. He served in various capacities in the music department, as chair in 1964-65 and from 1986 to 1989, as coordinator of the Master of Church Music program, and as associate editor of the journal Church Music (1966–80).

Richard Hillert was born in Granton, Clark County, Wis., on March 14, 1923. There he attended parochial and public schools and began writing piano music and songs in the popular style of the period at the age of fourteen. In 1947 he enrolled at Concordia Teachers College (now Concordia University Chicago), River Forest, where he received the Bachelor of Science degree in education. He served as teacher and music director for parishes in St. Louis, Mo., Wausau, Wis., and Chicago and Westchester, Ill. He received both the Master of Music and the Doctor of Music degrees in composition from Northwestern University, Evanston, Ill. His teachers included Matthew Nathaniel Lundquist, Anthony Donato, Alan Stout, Arrand Parsons, Emil Nolte, and John Ohl. He studied composition with the Italian composer, Goffredo Petrassi, at Aaron Copland's Berkshire Music Center, Tanglewood, Mass.

The list of hymns is quite extensive and many of them have involved direct collaboration with a number of distinguished hymn poets of the day, which include Jaroslav Vajda, Martin Franzmann, Fred Pratt Green, Henry Lettermann, Gracia Grindal, Herman G. Stuempfle, Jr., Jill Palaez Baumgaertner, Susan Cherwien and Don Saliers. Liturgical texts have been derived mainly from the biblical Psalms, the ordinary and proper readings from Old and New Testament, and words from the historic liturgy of the Western church.

Non-liturgical compositions include symphonic works for orchestra (Symphony in Three Movements, Variations for Orchestra, Suite for Strings), chamber works for small orchestra and ensembles (Alternations for Seven Instruments, Divertimento I and II) as well as many works for keyboard, instrumental solos and songs. His “Sonata for Piano” (1961) was awarded first prize in 1962 by the International Society for Contemporary Music, Chicago Chapter. Major organ works include Prelude and Toccata, Ricercata, Passacaglia on Innocent Sounds, Partita on Picardy, and Partita on Atkinson. There are also concert works with sacred texts, such as Five Canticles from the Exodus (1958), Te Deum for two pianos, percussion, and wind instruments (1962), The Alleluiatic Sequence (1980), and Seven Psalms of Grace for baritone solo and chamber orchestra (1998). Extended choral works, many written for Concordia's Kapelle conducted by Thomas Gieschen, include the Cantata: May God Bestow on Us His Grace (1964), Motet for the Day of Pentecost for choir, vibraphone, and prepared electronic tape (written for the round-the-world tour in 1969), Motet for the Time of Easter for double choir, percussion, and harp (1971), and Agnus Dei for three choirs and percussion instruments (1974).

Richard Hillert authored numerous scholarly articles and reviews for the periodicals such as Church Music, CrossAccent, and Currents in Theology and Mission, and other professional books and journals. He received an honorary Doctor of Sacred Music degree from Valparaiso University (2002), and honorary Doctor of Letters degrees from Concordia University at Seward, Nebraska (2000), and Concordia Seminary, St. Louis (2001). He was an honorary life member of the Association of Lutheran Church Musicians. His former students throughout the land have careers as practicing church musicians, elementary and secondary school teachers, teachers in higher education, music editors and publishers, and composers.

Richard Hillert was married to Gloria Bonnin Hillert (1930-2022). They had three children: Kathryn Brewer, Virginia and Jonathan Hillert; and six grandchildren.
