= Concordia Publishing House =

Publishing company owned by Lutheran Church-Missouri Synod

- Founded: 1869
- Country of origin: United States
- Headquarters location: St. Louis, Missouri, US; 38.5902°N 90.2255°W
- Key people: Jonathan D. Schultz (President & CEO)
- Publication types: Books, magazines, sheet music
- Nonfiction topics: Lutheranism
- Owner: Lutheran Church–Missouri Synod
- No. of employees: 250
- Official website: www.cph.org

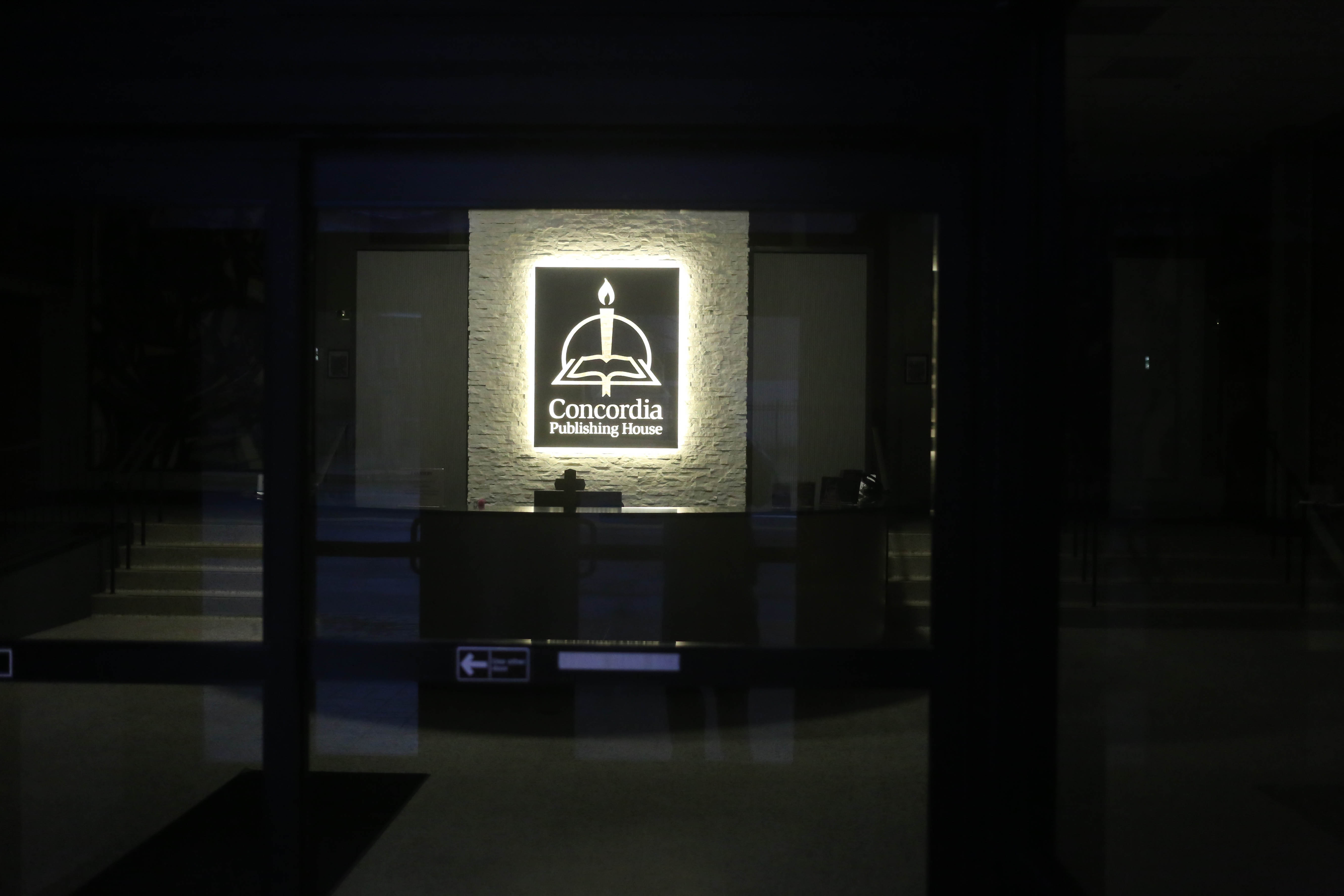
Concordia Publishing House, March 2018

Concordia Publishing House (CPH), founded in 1869, is the official publishing arm of the Lutheran Church–Missouri Synod (LCMS). Headquartered in St. Louis, Missouri, at 3558 S. Jefferson Avenue, CPH publishes the synod's official monthly magazine, The Lutheran Witness, and the synod's hymnals, including The Lutheran Hymnal (1941), Lutheran Worship (1982), and Lutheran Service Book (2006). It publishes a wide range of resources for churches, schools, and homes and is the publisher of the world's most widely circulated daily devotional resource, Portals of Prayer. Its children's books, known as Arch Books, have been published in millions of copies. Concordia Publishing House is the oldest publishing company west of the Mississippi River and the world's largest distinctly Lutheran publishing house.

== History ==
=== Background ===
In 1849, the LCMS created a publication society to provide "the most inexpensive and most general distribution of orthodox evangelical Lutheran books for education and edification". The society was to sell bonds to congregations, pastors, teachers, and lay members of the synod, who would then be repaid with the published material. However, few wanted to pay in advance for goods that might never be received, so by 1850, the society had failed. In April 1853, C. F. W. Walther and his congregation, Trinity Lutheran Church, started a separate Evangelical Lutheran Bible Society which initially imported German Bibles and later printed its own editions.

In 1857, the LCMS began using the firm of August Wiebusch und Sohn as its printer and appointed a publishing committee to negotiate prices and oversee the selection of goods to be sold. In return, Wiebusch agreed not to print anything other than the synod's publications. This again proved to be unworkable because Wiebusch did not want his presses to sit idle when no synodical work was available. Therefore, in late 1867 or 1868, the publishing committee installed a small printing press for $3,000 on the grounds of Concordia Seminary, which at that time was on South Jefferson Avenue in St. Louis.

=== Early years ===
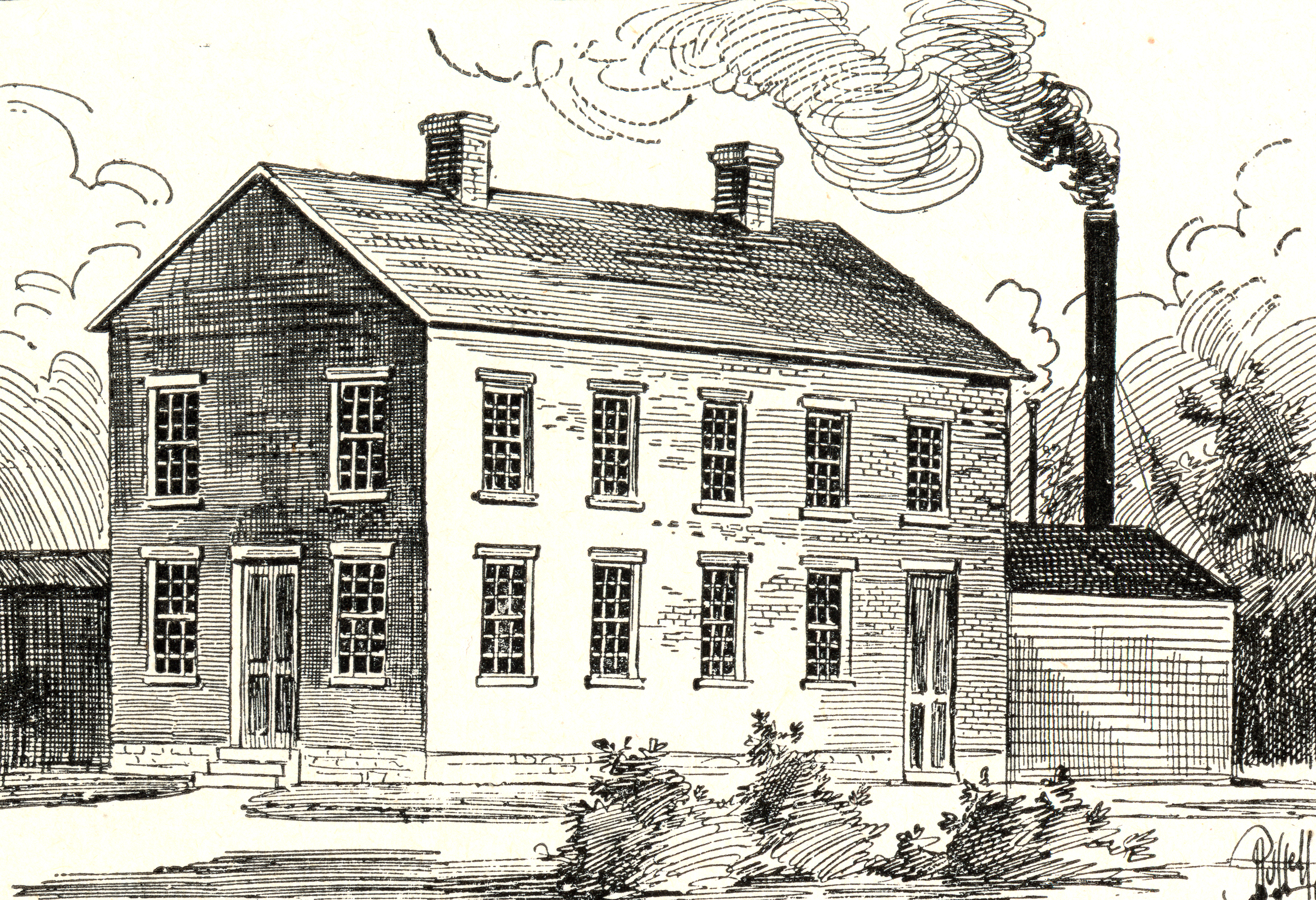
The first printing facility of Concordia Publishing House on Miami Street in St. Louis, Missouri

On September 11, 1869, the LCMS convention resolved to create a synodical typesetting facility and to fund a publishing facility by selling $25 bonds, redeemable in five years at 0 percent interest. The response was immediate and very successful, enabling construction of the first buildings of the physical plant on Miami Street between Jefferson and Indiana avenues, which remains the current site of CPH. The first CPH building was dedicated on February 28, 1870.

Martin C. Barthel, who had run a bookstore near Trinity Church that served as a retail outlet for LCMS publications starting in the 1850s, became general manager of the wholesale operations of CPH in 1869. The retail and wholesale sides were combined in 1874, when the second building of CPH opened at the corner of Indiana Avenue and Miami Street. By 1888, two additions to the second building had been built. In 1893, a third building was opened on Jefferson Avenue at Miami Street (the current 3558 South Jefferson Avenue address of CPH), with additions in 1911, 1925, and 1941.

Neither CPH nor the LCMS were incorporated during their early years. The 1870s saw attacks on church rights and parish schools as states began adding versions of the Blaine Amendment to their constitutions; this led CPH to take shelter under Concordia Seminary, which had been incorporated since 1853 and therefore had the legal right to hold real estate and bequests in trust for the LCMS, but the publishing house continued to operate independently.

In 1878, the synodical convention officially established the name of CPH as Lutherischer Concordia-Verlag (Lutheran Concordia Publishing House). The English name "Concordia Publishing House" was used as early as 1882. In 1887, the Bible society founded by Walther was merged into CPH, bringing with it the society's $17,407.73 in assets. The 1887 convention noted that CPH had been supplementing the synod's general fund since 1881, providing $97,700 in 1887.

CPH work made up a large part of the Proceedings of the 1887 convention, and grew even larger in 1890 as delegates had to deal with debt collection resolutions. Therefore, the 1890 convention authorized CPH to incorporate, which it did on May 27, 1891, as a stock company with 196 shares at $1,000 each, held in good faith by seven members of the board of directors, 28 shares each. This structure remained in place until World War II, when the Franklin Delano Roosevelt administration filed suits for income taxes against church-related organizations that were not incorporated in a compatible manner. CPH lost the case in court and reincorporated as a not-for-profit soon thereafter.

On August 14, 1891, a scandal erupted when the assistant general manager, Martin S. Tirmenstein, detected an unauthorized $50 check made out to M. C. Barthel, the general manager. An audit found irregularities involving both Barthel and his son, M. R. Barthel Jr. The younger Barthel fled, and his father was initially declared mentally unfit for trial. However, a grand jury indicted the elder Barthel on May 23, 1892. Found competent for trial, he confessed to the synod on July 23, 1892, and to the court on August 1, 1892, that he had embezzled $50,000 over the years. The events were covered in the national trade publication, The Publishers Weekly. As a result of the report on the incident to the 1893 synodical convention, the LCMS incorporated on June 2, 1894.

Tirmenstein became the general manager on November 17, 1891, and held that position until March 10, 1907, when he resigned to take a similar position at a printing firm in Germany. Under his leadership, CPH presented a display at the 1904 Louisiana Purchase Exposition in St. Louis that won the grand prize for excellence of workmanship and materials for the books shown, after having similar displays at the 1893 World's Columbian Exposition in Chicago and the 1901 Pan-American Exposition in Buffalo. CPH installed its first Linotype hot-metal press in 1905, and had seven by 1922. The publishing plant was electrified in 1908.

=== Notable German-language publications ===
The LCMS was originally an exclusively German-language synod. Even after the English language ultimately became predominant therein, some German works were still being published until the 1970s.

In September 1844, Walther began publishing Der Lutheraner, using the printing firm of Weber and Olhausen, who also published the German-language newspaper Anzeiger des Westens. The arrangement ended in 1850 due to differences in philosophical outlook between the LCMS and the firm. Moritz Niedner was the printer from 1850 to 1857 and Wiebusch from 1857 to 1869, at which point CPH was established. In 1853, the synod established Lehre und Wehre as a theological journal for the clergy, allowing Der Lutheraner to be aimed at the laity. Lehre und Wehre eventually was merged with other theological periodicals of the synod to form the Concordia Theological Monthly, predecessor to today's Concordia Journal.

Der Lutheraner was published semi-monthly until World War II; it was published bi-monthly thereafter as the number of German speakers in the synod declined. The final issue was November–December 1974, with a run of 2,400 copies, many of which were sent to members of the Independent Evangelical-Lutheran Church (SELK) in Germany and to subscribers in Brazil and Finland. Its largest circulation had been 40,000 in 1922.

The first hymnal of the LCMS, Kirchen-Gesangbuch für Evangelish-Lutherische Gemeinden (Church Hymn Book for Evangelical Lutheran Congregations), was initially published by Walther's congregation in 1847. The LCMS assumed publication in 1861, using Wiebusch as the printer. After CPH took over publication, the hymnal was revised and enlarged several times.

The largest project in the German language undertaken by CPH was the 22-volume Dr. Martin Luthers Sämmtliche Schriften (Dr. Martin Luther's Complete Writings). Published between 1880 and 1910 and known as the "St. Louis Edition", it is arguably the largest German-language work ever printed in the United States. The project was initiated by a proposal at the 1879 convention of the synod's Western District, and was financed by subscription orders by the synod's pastors, who pledged themselves to pay for each volume as it was issued despite not knowing in advance what that price would be. Three levels of binding were offered: cloth, cloth/leather combination, and leather with gilding on the page edges and cover. The St. Louis Edition was a revision of Johann Georg Walch's 18th-century edition, with Luther's Latin writings translated in German.

=== Adoption of English ===
Already by the 1870s, CPH's catalog offered a number of English-language resources. However, many of them were written by non-Lutherans, including Charles Spurgeon. It has been suggested it was a case of "in the land of the blind, the one-eyed man is king" — that is, since so few of the pastors and theologians of the LCMS were conversant in English, CPH had to take what was available.

By 1900, increasing numbers of members of the LCMS were using English as a second or even first language. In 1911, the English Evangelical Lutheran Synod of Missouri and Other States merged into the LCMS. Among the assets brought in with the merger was the American Lutheran Publication Board (ALPB) in Pittsburgh, Pennsylvania. The ALPB had published a second edition of the Evangelical Lutheran Hymn-Book in 1909 (the first edition having been published in Baltimore, Maryland), which CPH reissued, with music, in 1912. The ALPB had also published English translations of some of CPH's German works. Perhaps the most important publication acquired with the ALPB was The Lutheran Witness magazine, which is still published today. By 1916, its circulation equaled that of Der Lutheraner, and in 1922, its 400,000 subscriptions far exceeded the latter's.

The number of German works in the CPH catalog decreased while the number of English ones increased during the first half of the 20th century. The 1919–20 catalog had 512 pages of English resources but only 204 of German. By 1933, the catalog had grown to 1,100 pages, only 200 of which were in German. In 1948, only 100 of about 700 pages were in German, signaling that the German era of both CPH and the LCMS had just about ended.

The 1948 catalog also demonstrated an increasing reliance on conservative Protestant, especially Presbyterian, writings because many of the standard German Lutheran works had not yet been translated into English. Thus, the catalog had a number of apologetic books written against Roman Catholicism and the papacy, but few such books against Calvinism or American Protestantism in general. Notably, only one edition of the Lutheran Confessions, Book of Concord, was offered, namely, the English translation from the Concordia Triglotta that had been published in 1926, and it was "tucked away" on the last page of the "symbolics, confessions, history of dogma" section.

From 1946 into the 1950s was a boom time for CPH. By 1948, the company had over 800 employees and was adding office space at its headquarters. In 1948, the pressroom and bindery were enlarged, and in 1951, another large building was erected. A fourth floor was added in 1955 to the building constructed in 1925, and the original 1874 building was replaced with a 5-story one in 1962–63.

A working group was established in the 1950s to encourage the funding and production of scholarly works, including English translations of Luther's Works, Johann Gerhard's Loci Theologici, and Martin Chemnitz's Examination of the Council of Trent.

=== Theological controversy and resolution ===
After World War II, LCMS theologians entered into conversation with their counterparts in Germany, leading to the use of historical criticism of the Bible in the synod's institutions such as CPH and Concordia Seminary. As a result, the types of works offered in the CPH catalog changed. The 1971 catalog featured a number of works by liberal mainline Protestants that embraced the historical critical method, the social gospel, and ecumenical movements. The catalog also announced a new curriculum for Lutheran schools and Sunday schools entitled Mission:Life furthering those initiatives that had developed by the LCMS Board of Parish Education. The synod in convention reacted negatively to these trends, resulting in the Seminex crisis, and subsequently replaced the Mission:Life material. In 1992, CPH became responsible for developing the parish education material instead of merely printing it.

Even before the Seminex crisis, CPH had produced J. A. O. Preus's translation of Chemnitz's The Two Natures in Christ and Robert Preus's The Theology of Post-Reformation Lutheranism. Since then it has released (and plans to release in the future) translations of a number of additional works by Chemnitz, Gerhard, and Walther in an effort to bridge the gap between the German-speaking of the early synod and the English-speaking one of today.

In 1974, CPH installed its first IBM computer, one of only three companies in St. Louis to have done so at that time.

By the late 1990s, CPH realized that it was having operational and financial difficulties, so it embraced a quality improvement project. As a result, In 2009, CPH won the Missouri Quality Award for its business performance and in 2011, it received a Malcolm Baldrige National Quality Award, the first publisher of any type to receive the award.

== Notable English-language publications ==
=== Luther's Works: The American Edition ===
In the early 1950s, CPH and Fortress Press (the publishing house of the Lutheran Church in America) began plans to translate a significant portion of Martin Luther's writings into English as Luther's Works: The American Edition. CPH published volumes 1–30, consisting of Luther's exegetical writings, with Jaroslav Pelikan as general editor, between 1955 and 1976. Fortress published volumes 31–54, consisting of Luther's non-exegetical theological writings, with Helmut T. Lehmann as general editor, between 1957 and 1986. The 54 volumes translated about a third of the material in the Weimar edition (excluding the Deutsche Bibel subsection).

Around 2004, CPH leadership decided to publish more of Luther's works, conceiving a plan for 20 additional volumes that was approved by the CPH board of directors in 2006. Christopher Boyd Brown, and later, Benjamin T. G. Mayes, are the general editors. The first new volume was published in 2009, and the number of planned volumes was increased to 28 soon thereafter to be able to include the Church Postil and House Postil sermons for the church year. While the original 54 volumes reflected the interest of scholars at that time in focusing on the younger Luther and in isolating Luther's thoughts from those of his contemporaries, the new volumes are more interested in showing the older Luther as the leader of a reform team. The new volumes include more of Luther's sermons and disputations, and also include sermons in the Church Postil which Luther himself did not write but which he had approved. As of 2019, about half of the additional volumes had been published.

=== Concordia Commentary series ===
The 1941 convention of the LCMS requested that CPH produce a Lutheran Bible commentary series, resulting in three volumes being published in 1952 and 1956. These commentaries were scholarly and aimed at pastors and theologians. However, with the translation of Luther's Works beginning at that time, CPH did not have the resources to develop both projects, so the "Bible Commentary" series was put on hold.

In 1968, CPH began publishing its first Concordia Commentary series, but the series was terminated after only five volumes had been published, due to the theological issues that had arisen in the LCMS. Two of the volumes voiced the traditional view of Scriptures that the LCMS had always used and two were sympathetic to the historical-critical method. Unlike the "Bible Commentary" series, this series attempted to be usable by both pastors and laity, but many felt that it was too superficial for pastors and too difficult for lay people.

During 1990, interest in restarting the Concordia Commentary series led to an initial proposal for a 20-year project costing $1.5 to $2 million to produce either 26, 31, or 35 volumes covering all the books of the Bible, with a target audience of pastors and theologians. A series of meetings were held with interested parties in the LCMS in 1991 and 1992 to determine support for the project, and the Marvin M. Schwan Charitable Foundation agreed to provide funding for 1992 through 1999,

Arthur A. Just of Concordia Theological Seminary agreed to write the first volume in the series, on the Gospel of Luke, by 1996. A single volume of about 500 pages had been contracted, but by 1995 it became apparent that he had written that much just to cover the first half of the gospel. Rather than attempt to condense his work and lose the depth of what he had written, CPH decided to add a second volume for Luke, setting a precedent for the remaining commentaries. The two volumes on Luke were issued in 1996 and 1997 after a year each in editorial work. As experience was gained, the process became more efficient and by 2003, the goal of issuing two volumes per year had been reached.

Jonathan F. Grothe served as general editor from 1992 to 1999. Dean O. Wenthe, who had been assistant general editor, became general editor from 1999 to 2016.

The series has been described as the "largest confessional Lutheran Bible commentary project" by any Lutheran publisher. As of 2020, more than 40 authors have participated in the project, coming from the LCMS, the Evangelical Lutheran Synod, the Wisconsin Evangelical Lutheran Synod, the Lutheran Church–Canada, the Evangelical Lutheran Church of Brazil, and the Lutheran Church of Australia. About half of the now-projected 74 volumes had been published by 2019.

=== The Lutheran Witness ===
The Lutheran Witness
- Frequency: Monthly (11 per year)
- Founder: Charles Frank
- First issue: May 21, 1882; 144 years ago
- Company: Concordia Publishing House
- Country: United States
- Language: English
- Website: witness.lcms.org
- ISSN: 0024-757X

The Lutheran Witness is the official magazine of the LCMS. It is published by CPH monthly except for a combined June/July issue and is available in both print and digital formats.

In the 1880s, as English was becoming more used in the LCMS, the Cleveland (Ohio) District Pastoral Conference to provide $250 to support the efforts of Charles Frank, a Lutheran pastor in Zanesville, Ohio, to publish The Lutheran Witness in order to make the LCMS perspective available to English-speaking Lutherans. The first issue was published on May 21, 1882.

In 1884, the Cleveland District Pastoral Conference decided the magazine had accomplished its goals, and ended the financial support. Frank offered to give the publication to the LCMS, but the offer was declined. Nevertheless, Frank decided to continue publishing the magazine without any official support. In 1888, the newly-formed English Evangelical Lutheran Synod of Missouri and Other States assumed ownership of The Lutheran Witness, a relationship that continued until 1911, when the English Synod merged into the LCMS and production of the magazine was transferred to CPH.

The first issues of the magazine were offered at no cost, but with a request for subscription support. It has always been distributed on a subscription basis. In the first few years there were 1,000 subscribers, increasing to almost 3,500 in 1911; 4,800 in 1914; 72,000 in 1936; 240,000 in 1946; and peaking at 625,000 in 1965, at which time about two-thirds of LCMS households received it.

In 1936, the Iowa District became the first LCMS district to have a district supplement included in the magazine. By 1946, 26 of the districts had supplements. The Witness editors at that time said that "the district edition plan" was the single most important factor in their effort to have a "church paper in every home". The digital edition of the Witness does not include the district supplement.

After 1965, the number of subscribers gradually decreased to 152,350 in 2011 and, as of 2021, to 100,000, of which 95% are congregations purchasing the magazine in bulk for their members.

=== Other publications ===
A daily devotion booklet began to be published in 1937, eventually being named Portals of Prayer in 1948, the name under which it continues to be published. Almost 900,000 copies of Portals are printed and distributed quarterly. Publication of its German language counterpart, Tagliche Andachten, was discontinued in 1999. It was CPH's last regularly published work in German.

Besides Sunday School and Christian Day School materials, CPH has published a number of books for children, including A Child’s Garden of Bible Stories and Little Visits with God. In 1959, it introduced a children's series of Bible stories costing 35 cents each. Originally named Lantern Books, they were renamed Arch Books in 1965 in honor of the Gateway Arch in St. Louis, which opened that year. Sixty million copies have been sold since they were introduced.

Since publishing the Kirchen-Gesanbuch für Evangelish-Lutherische Gemeinden and the Evangelical Lutheran Hymn-Book, CPH has published the subsequent hymnals of the LCMS — The Lutheran Hymnal in 1941, Lutheran Worship in 1982, and the Lutheran Service Book in 2006 — as well as supplemental and children's hymnbooks. It also produces a large selection of choral, organ, and other liturgical music. CPH published a comprehensive edition of Johann Sebastian Bach's Orgelbüchlein, complete with short analyses of each chorale in 1984.

On September 1, 2009, CPH released The Lutheran Study Bible (TLSB), the first study Bible in English to be developed from the ground up with notes exclusively from Lutheran theologians, scholars, and pastors, representing twelve Lutheran church bodies. The TLSB uses the English Standard Version of the Bible. In October 2012, CPH released The Apocrypha: The Lutheran Edition with Notes, the first time it had published an English language version of the Apocrypha, although the German-language Bibles it had published earlier in its history had included those writings.
