= Mitten wir im Leben sind (Mendelssohn) =

1830 motet

- Motet by Felix Mendelssohn
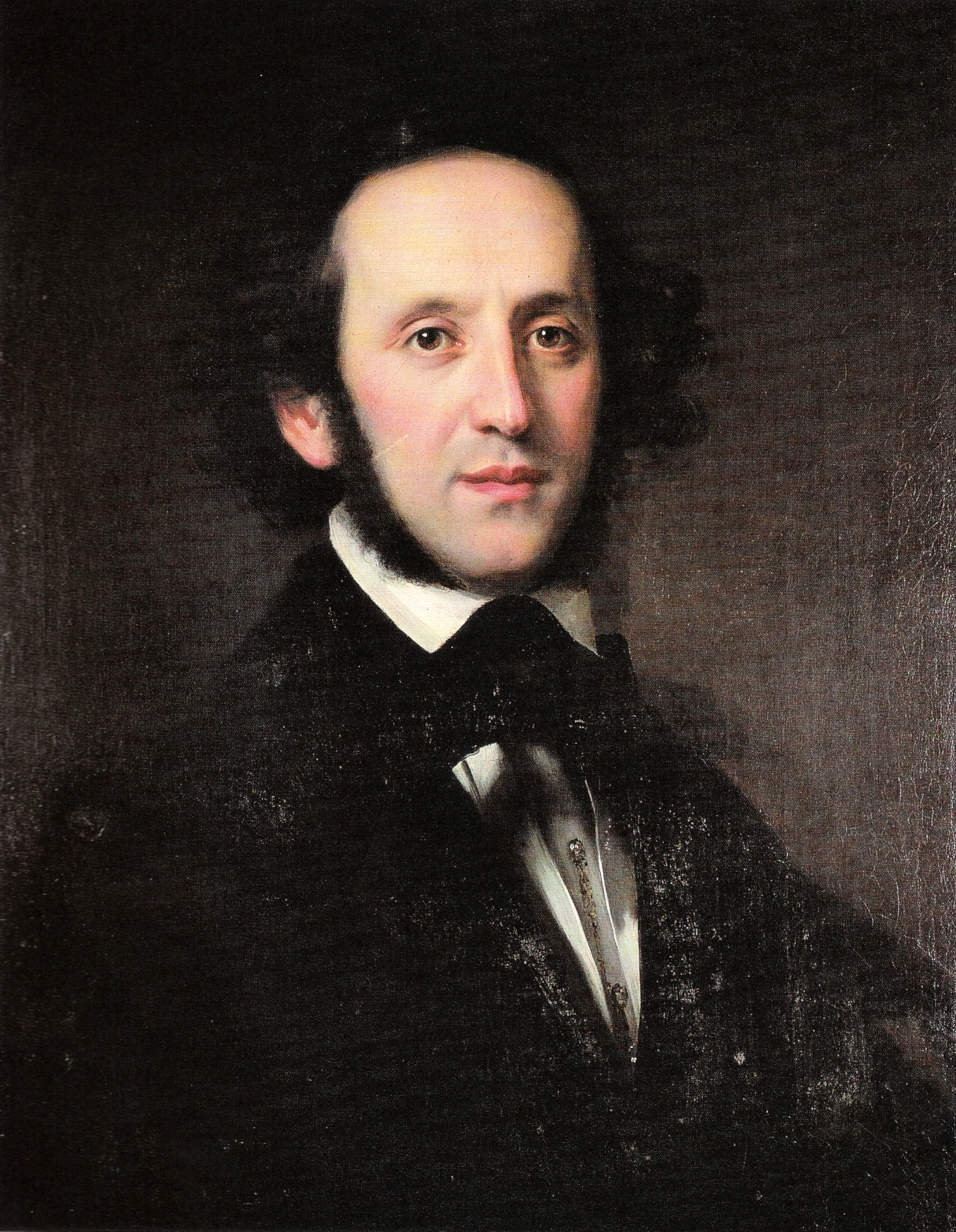
- The composer in 1846, portrait by Eduard Magnus
- English: Even in the midst of life
- Key: C minor
- Text: "Mitten wir im Leben sind" by Martin Luther
- Language: German
- Published: 1830
- Scoring: SSAATTBB choir

Mitten wir im Leben sind is a motet by Felix Mendelssohn as the third and final part of his Kirchenmusik, Op. 23, described as a "small choral work", for SSAATTBB choir, a cappella in the key of C minor in cut time. The text was written by Martin Luther, based on the Latin antiphon "Media vita in morte sumus" (in the midst of life we are in death). The motet was published in 1830.

== Music ==
Mendelssohn wrote to his sister Fanny on November 22, 1830 that the motet was one of the best church pieces that he had ever written, and that it "growls angrily, or whistles, dark blue."

For the first and second verses, the tenors and basses begin by contemplating a question, the sopranos and altos answering, and the tenors and basses finishing the answer. The tempo then speeds up, with a plea for mercy as the choir builds into a repeated "Kyrie eleison" sung at fortissimo. The third verse is structured differently, having all the parts sing throughout the verse. There is also no tempo change, but a few dynamic changes.
