= Evangelical Lutheran Hymnary =

Prayer book by the Evangelical Lutheran Synod

- Commissioned by: Evangelical Lutheran Synod
- Released: 1996
- Publisher: Morningstar Music Publishers
- No. of Hymns: 602
← The Lutheran Hymnal	

The Evangelical Lutheran Hymnary (ELH) is a hymnal created by the Evangelical Lutheran Synod in 1996.

The Norwegian heritage of the ELS is evident in this hymnal, although a broader ethnicity is clearly represented. From the indexes located in the back of the hymnary, on pages 926ff entitled "Translated Hymns", it is clear that the majority of the hymns come from German, Scandinavian, and Latin sources, however Greek, Czech, French, and other sources are also present.

The cover of this hymnary is black with a gold imprinted logo on the front cover. The logo used is a Latin cross with budded arms superimposed over a lyre, on a diamond-shaped background. Inside these covers one finds more than hymn texts: The Church Year is summarized, followed by the full texts of the Augsburg Confession; the texts of the Apostles' Creed, the Nicene Creed, and the Athanasian Creed; and Martin Luther's Small Catechism . Prayers are included as well as four different rites of the Divine Service. The Divine Service: Rite One is based on the Danish Ritual of 1685; The Divine Service Rite Two is from the Common Service from 1888; The Divine Service: Rite Three is a new setting by Dr. Alfred Fremder; and The Divine Service: Rite Four is the Lutheran "Chorale Mass". Other services included here are The Office of the Prime, Matins, Vespers, Compline, and others. A Service of Private Confession and Absolution is also included. Psalms, canticles, and other resources are also found here.

While most American Lutherans are familiar with a joint confession of sins followed by a spoken absolution from the pastor, this hymnary features an optional Individual Absolution (on page 43). Before each worshipper hears the word of absolution, the pastor says, "Upon this your confession, come forward to the altar of the Lord and receive the declaration of the forgiveness of all your sins. The communicants come forward and kneel at the altar rail."

A total of 602 hymns appear in this work. Some appear merely as lyrics with only a suggested tune listed, others include musical notation. The text is enriched by language like that in the New King James Version.
