= Evangelical Lutheran Hymn-Book =

1912 Lutheran Hymnal

- Commissioned by: Evangelical Lutheran Synod of Missouri, Ohio, and other States
- Approved for: Evangelical Lutheran Synod of Missouri, Ohio, and other States
- Released: 1912
- Publisher: Concordia Publishing House
- Pages: 650
- No. of Hymns: 543
- Psalms: Yes
- Service music: Yes
← Kirchengesangbuch für Evangelisch-Lutherische Gemeinden ungeänderter Augsburgischer Confession	The Lutheran Hymnal →

The Evangelical Lutheran Hymn-Book was the first official English-language hymnal of the Lutheran Church – Missouri Synod, then known as the Evangelical Lutheran Synod of Missouri, Ohio, and other States. It was published in 1912 by the synod's publishing house, Concordia Publishing House, in St. Louis, Missouri.

The adoption of the Evangelical Lutheran Hymn-book was part of the transition of the synod from the use of German to English. Since its founding in 1847, the synod had used the Kirchengesangbuch für Evangelisch-Lutherische Gemeinden ungeänderter Augsburgischer Confession (Church Hymnal for Evangelical Lutheran Churches of the Unaltered Augsburg Confession), compiled and edited by C. F. W. Walther (the synod's first president) and a group of other pastors.

By the late 1800s, the need for an English hymnal had become apparent. Walther himself recommended the Hymn Book for the Use of Evangelical Lutheran Schools and Congregations, which had been edited by August Crull, a professor at Concordia College in Fort Wayne, Indiana, and was published in 1879 by the Norwegian Lutherans in Decorah, Iowa. Other English hymnbooks that were used especially for outreach included Lutheran Hymns: For the Use of English Lutheran Missions (1882), Hymns of the Evangelical Lutheran Church: For the Use of English Lutheran Missions (1886), and Hymns for Evangelical Lutheran Missions (1905).

Crull assembled and edited a new hymnal, the Evangelical Lutheran Hymn Book, and presented it to the English Evangelical Lutheran Synod of Missouri and Other States, which published it in Baltimore, Maryland, in 1889. The English Synod eventually merged into the Missouri Synod as its English District in 1911. A later edition of this collection of hymns with accompanying music and with the slightly altered name of Evangelical Lutheran Hymn-Book was then published by Concordia Publishing House in 1912 as the first official English hymnal of the Missouri Synod.

The hymnal was later often referred to as the "old green hymnal" due to the color of its binding. Originally containing 543 hymns, it underwent significant expansion prior to the publishing of The Lutheran Hymnal in 1941.

== See also ==
- List of English-language hymnals by denomination
