= Lutheran Service Book =

2006 hymnal

- The pew edition of Lutheran Service Book
- Commissioned by: Lutheran Church–Missouri Synod
- Approved for: Lutheran Church–Missouri Synod, Lutheran Church–Canada
- Released: 2006
- Publisher: Concordia Publishing House
- Pages: 1024
- No. of Hymns: 635
- Psalms: 107
- Service music: 5 settings of the Divine Service, 5 Daily Offices, other services
← Lutheran Worship	

Lutheran Service Book (LSB) is the newest official hymnal of the Lutheran Church–Missouri Synod (LCMS) and the Lutheran Church–Canada (LCC). It was prepared by the LCMS Commission on Worship and published in 2006 by Concordia Publishing House, the official publisher of the LCMS. It is the fourth official English-language hymnal of the LCMS published since the synod began transitioning from German to English in the early 1900s. LSB is intended to succeed both The Lutheran Hymnal (TLH) and Lutheran Worship (LW) as the common hymnal of the LCMS. Supplemental and companion editions to the hymnal were released throughout the end of 2006 and into 2007. The hymnal was officially approved by the LCMS at the 2004 LCMS National Convention in St. Louis. It was officially released on September 1, 2006, but many who preordered received their copies early.

In April 2015, Lutheran Service Book became the first Lutheran hymnal to be made available in ebook format.

== Contents ==
- A selection of Psalms
- Five musical settings of the Divine Service
  - Setting One (by Richard Hillert, first introduced in Lutheran Book of Worship)
  - Setting Two (by Ronald A. Nelson, first introduced in Lutheran Book of Worship)
  - Setting Three (the Common Service of 1888)
  - Setting Four (first introduced in Hymnal Supplement 98)
  - Setting Five (based loosely on the Deutsche Messe by Martin Luther)
- Musical settings of the Daily Offices
  - Matins
  - Vespers
  - Morning Prayer
  - Evening Prayer
  - Compline
- Other orders of service
  - Service of Prayer and Preaching
  - Holy Baptism
  - Confirmation
  - Holy Matrimony
  - Funeral Service
  - Two orders for responsive prayer
    - Responsive Prayer 1 (Suffrages)
    - Responsive Prayer 2
  - The Litany
  - Corporate Confession and Absolution
  - Individual Confession and Absolution
  - Daily Prayer for Individuals and Families
- Daily Lectionary
- More than 100 prayers for various occasions and circumstances
- Martin Luther's Small Catechism
- 658 canticles, chorales, hymns, and songs, 23 of which are found in Lutheran Service Builder (see below)
- Comprehensive cross-referenced indexes

== Editions ==
In addition to the pew edition, several other editions of LSB are available:

- Altar Book
- Accompaniment editions
  - LSB Accompaniment—Liturgy
  - LSB Accompaniment—Hymns
  - Guitar Chord Edition (2 Volume Set)
- Ebook Edition
- Lectionaries
  - Three-Year Lectionary—Year A
  - Three-Year Lectionary—Year B
  - Three-Year Lectionary—Year C
  - One-Year Lectionary
- Agenda
- Pastoral Care Companion
- Companions
  - Companion to the Services
  - Companion to the Hymns (2 Volume Set)

== Lutheran Service Builder ==
In addition to the various print editions of the hymnal, the Commission on Worship prepared an electronic edition of Lutheran Service Book known as Lutheran Service Builder. This computer program is structured in order to allow churches to easily prepare printed orders of service and electronically presented orders of service, containing readings, hymns, and service music.

== See also ==
- List of English-language hymnals by denomination
