= Portals of Prayer =

- Frequency: Quarterly
- Format: daily devotional
- First issue: Lent 1937; 89 years ago
- Company: Concordia Publishing House
- Country: United States
- Based in: St. Louis, Missouri
- Language: English, Spanish
- Website: www.cph.org/portals/
- ISSN: 0032-4884

Portals of Prayer is a quarterly publication of the Concordia Publishing House of St. Louis, Missouri, the denominational publisher for the Lutheran Church–Missouri Synod, with a printed circulation of almost 900,000 copies each quarter. The 4 1/8 by 6 1/2 inches (100 mm × 170 mm) publication consists of one-page daily devotions based upon a verse of Scripture along with suggestions for further reading of a Scripture and of a Psalm. Each devotion closes with a brief prayer. A separate section features prayers for the days of the week and occasional prayers covering liturgical and civic calendar events as well as for various situations. Each issue has a short prayer order that can be used by individuals, families, and small groups. Luther's Morning and Evening prayers, and prayers for meal-times are also included.

== History ==
The first issue of this devotional booklet was published for Lent 1937 with the title Standing In His Grace. For the first several years the booklets carried a variety of names such as He Loved Me, Walking With God, Streams of Living Water, and Quiet Moments With God. Beginning in the spring of 1948, the periodical took the name Portals of Prayer for each issue. Other changes have occurred over the years as well. First delivered seven times a year, Portals of Prayer became a bi-monthly devotional in 1959, and a quarterly publication in 1981. A German language counterpart, Tägliche Andachten was published from 1937 until 1999, a Spanish language version, Portales de Oración began in 2008, and a braille edition has also been available. While the devotional has always been available in the familiar "pocket-sized" edition, new sizes and formats have joined it over the years. A large-sized "sight-saver" print edition was in introduced in the 1970s and a digest-sized print edition began being offered in 2010. Over the years the reach of Portals of Prayer have been made available on long-playing (LP) record albums, cassette tape recordings, as well as being broadcast on numerous radio stations. Portals of Prayer is also available via the internet and smart phones.

In 2007 the interior layout of the devotions was changed, the first significant change in the layout since its inception. In 2008 the trim size changed to 4 1/8 by 6 1/2 inches (100 mm × 170 mm) from its former 4 by 6 inches (100 mm × 150 mm) size to accommodate changes in printing technology.

By editorial policy, the covers of the saddle-stitched booklets never depict people. Instead they usually feature photos of natural outdoor scenes.

== Anthologies ==
Three anthologies of Portals of Prayer meditations have been made by the publisher over the years.

1. Meditations from Portals of Prayer. Concordia Publishing House, St. Louis. 1957.
2. The Best of Portals of Prayer. Concordia Publishing House, St. Louis. 1990.
3. Daily Devotions: Drawn from 75 Years of Portals of Prayer. Concordia Publishing House, St. Louis. 2011.

== Editors ==
The Rev. Eric Forss served as editor of Portals of Prayer from 2002 to 2009. The Rev. Scot Kinnaman, senior editor at CPH, currently serves as managing editor (2003–present) and editor (2009-present).

== Writing for Portals ==
Writers are recruited each year in the Fall from recommendations, invitations made to previous writers, and applications. While often members of the LCMS, past authors have been selected from both clergy and lay among Lutherans in the US, Canada, Australia, and Britain. Writers are selected based upon their demonstrated ability to write in a clear and engaging style while demonstrating a keen ability to proclaim the Gospel of God's love and mercy in the person and work of Jesus Christ as presented in Holy Scripture and confessed in the Confessions of the Lutheran Church (Book of Concord, 1580).
