= Service Book and Hymnal =

Lutheran service book and hymnal

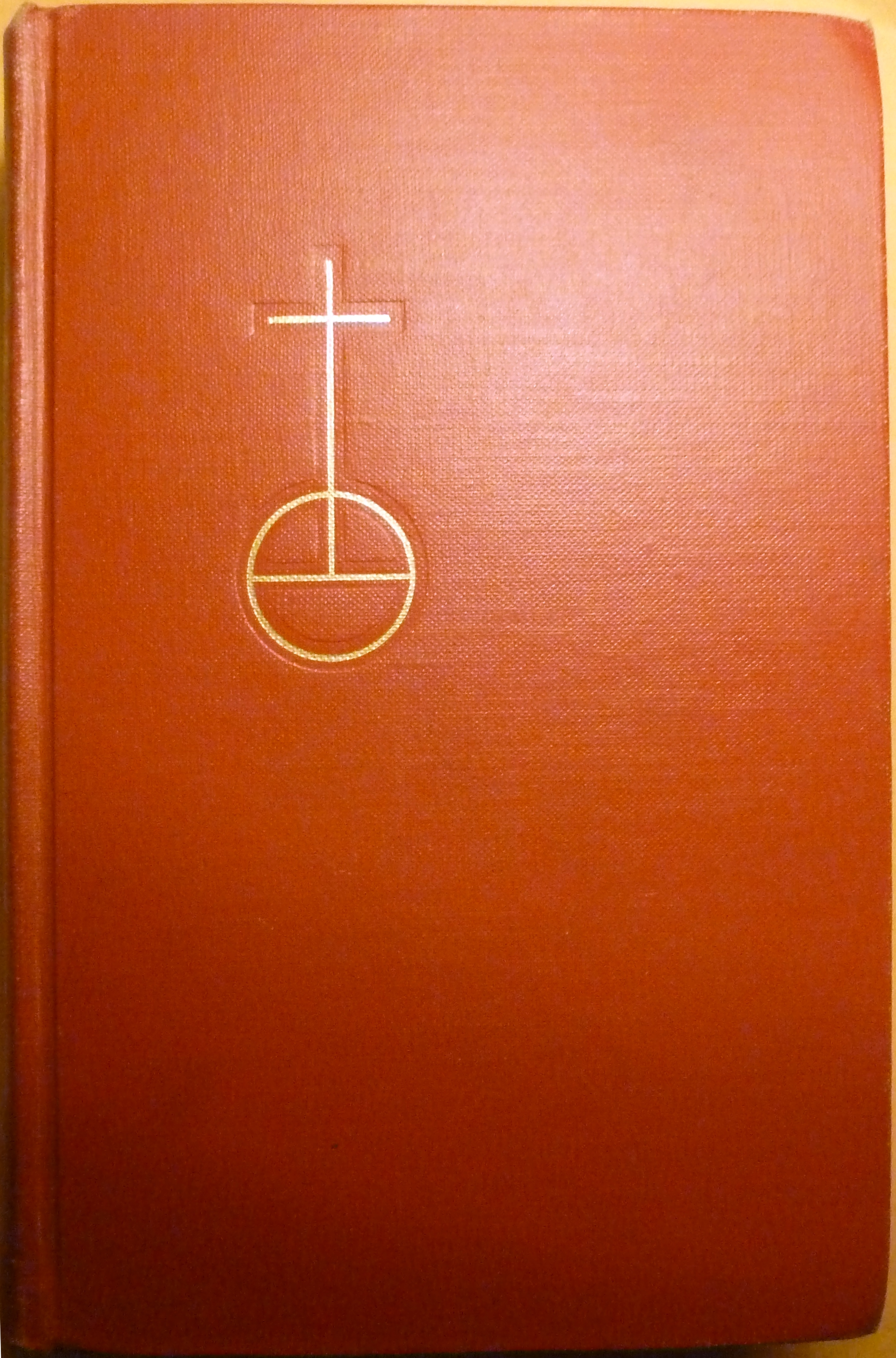
- Service Book and Hymnal, published in 1958
- Approved for: American Evangelical Lutheran Church, American Lutheran Church (1930), Augustana Evangelical Lutheran Church, Evangelical Lutheran Church, Finnish Evangelical Lutheran Church of America, Lutheran Free Church, United Evangelical Lutheran Church, United Lutheran Church in America
- Released: 1958
- Publisher: Augsburg Publishing House, et al.
- No. of Hymns: 602
- Psalms: 150
← Various, including: Common Service Book	Lutheran Book of Worship →

The Service Book and Hymnal (SBH) is a hymnal first published in 1958 by Augsburg Publishing House. It was used by most of the Lutheran church bodies in the United States that today compose the Evangelical Lutheran Church in America (ELCA) prior to the publishing of the Lutheran Book of Worship (LBW) of 1978. In ELCA circles, historically, the Service Book and Hymnal has been called the "red book" while the Lutheran Book of Worship has been called the "green book." The newest ELCA hymnal, Evangelical Lutheran Worship (ELW) is often referred to as "the cranberry book".

Prior to the merger of 1987 which created the ELCA, there were several smaller Lutheran church bodies. The ones involved in the Service Book and Hymnal included the American Evangelical Lutheran Church, the American Lutheran Church (1930), the Augustana Evangelical Lutheran Church, the Evangelical Lutheran Church, the Finnish Evangelical Lutheran Church of America, the Lutheran Free Church, the United Evangelical Lutheran Church, and the United Lutheran Church in America. These churches (most of whom are now in the ELCA) had many different hymnals until 1958 when the Service Book and Hymnal came out.

Service Book and Hymnal contains 602 hymns, the first 148 of them organized to correspond with the Church Year. The liturgies and Psalms precede the hymns, with indexes in the back. Three settings of The Service were available whereas only the first two (p. 15 & p. 41) were included in the pew editions of the hymnal. Chant, chorale and plainsong styles were used. The cover of SBH features a gold cross on a circle logo symbolizing Christ in the world.

== See also ==
- List of English-language hymnals by denomination
