= Lutheran Worship =

Collection of Lutheran hymns

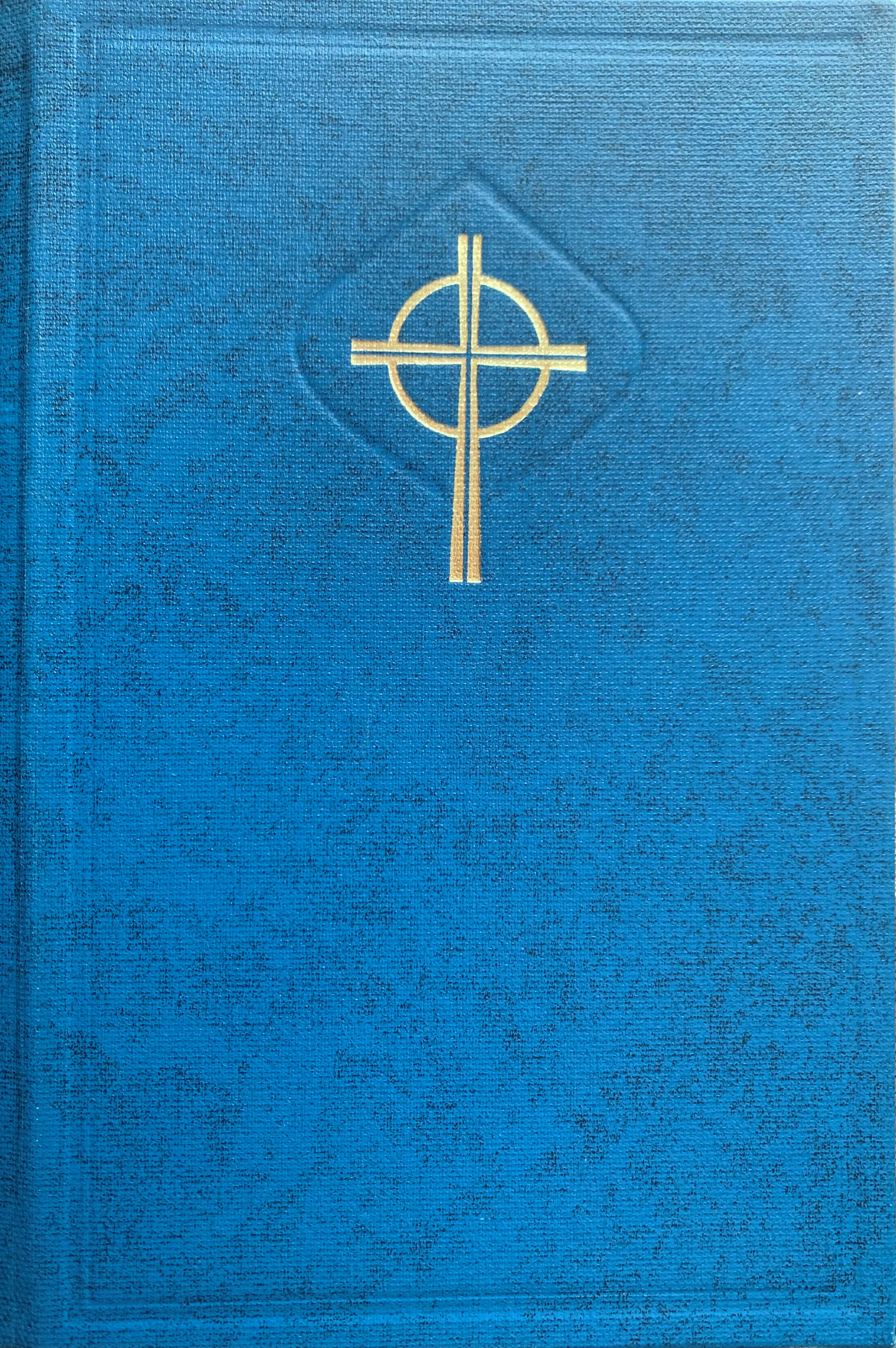
- 1982 edition of Lutheran Worship
- Commissioned by: The Commission on Worship of The Lutheran Church–Missouri Synod
- Approved for: Lutheran Church–Missouri Synod, Lutheran Church - Canada
- Released: 1982
- Publisher: Concordia Publishing House
- Pages: 1,005
- No. of Hymns: 11 canticles and chants, 509 hymns
- Psalms: Yes
- Service music: Yes
← Lutheran Book of Worship; The Lutheran Hymnal	Hymnal Supplement 98 (Supplement, see below) →

- Hymnal Supplement 98
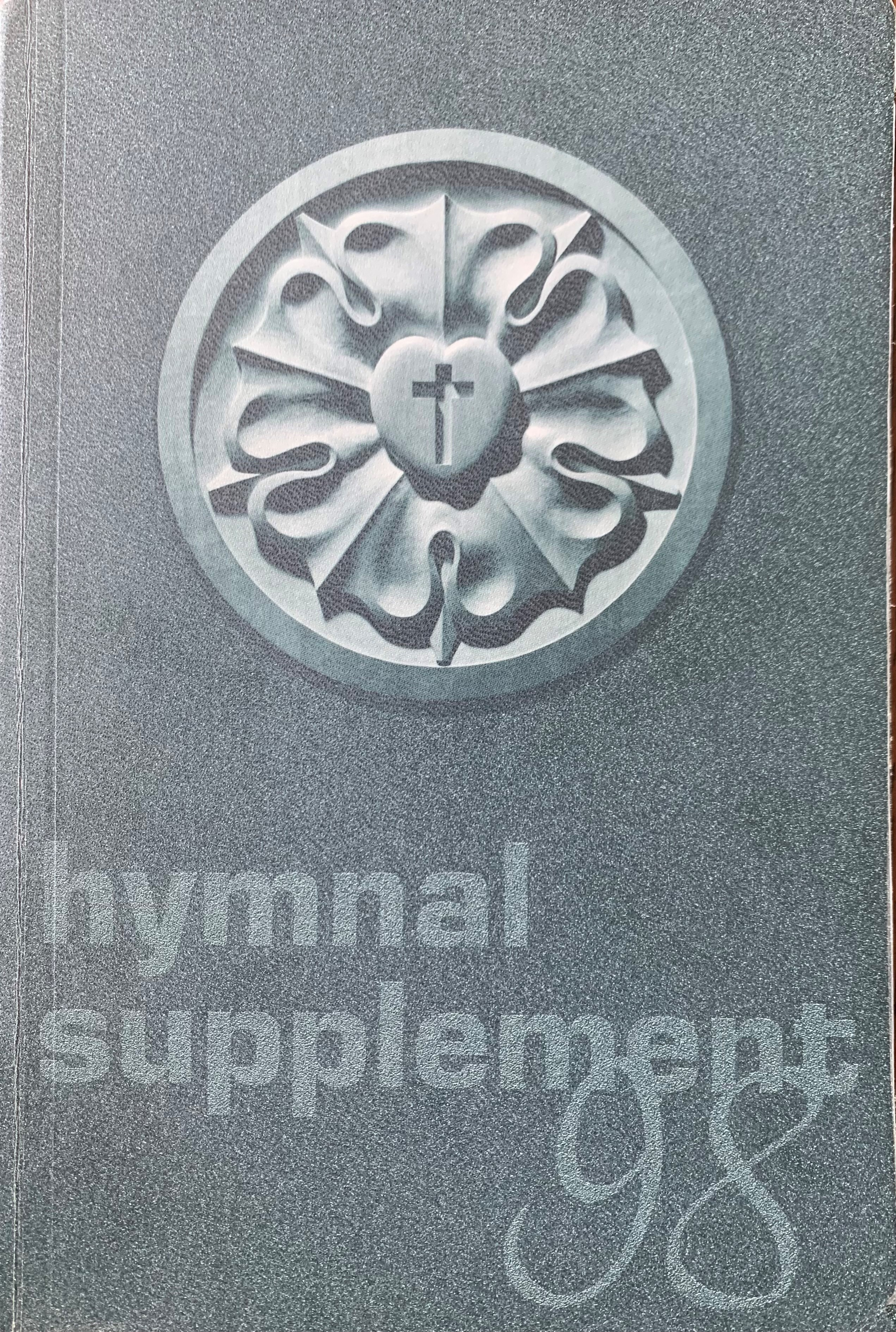
- Hymnal Supplement 98
- Commissioned by: The Commission on Worship of The Lutheran Church–Missouri Synod
- Approved for: Lutheran Church–Missouri Synod
- Released: 1998
- Publisher: Concordia Publishing House
- Pages: 192
- No. of Hymns: 113
- Psalms: Yes
- Service music: Yes
← Lutheran Worship	Lutheran Service Book →

Lutheran Worship (LW) is one of the official hymnals of The Lutheran Church–Missouri Synod (LCMS). Published in 1982 by Concordia Publishing House in St. Louis, Missouri, it is the denomination's third English-language hymnal and was intended to replace The Lutheran Hymnal (TLH). Additional hymns and service music are contained in the companion, Hymnal Supplement 98.

Dissatisfaction with various revisions has led numerous congregations to continue using the previous hymnal, and according to a 1999 LCMS Commission on Worship survey, The Lutheran Hymnal was still used by 36% of churches in the Synod as their primary hymnal. The publication of another new hymnal, Lutheran Service Book in 2006, has restored many of the former hymnal's features in the hope that more widespread use can be achieved.

== History ==
Lutheran Worship is, essentially, a revision of the green-covered Lutheran Book of Worship of 1978 that was the common liturgical book and hymnal of the old Lutheran Church in America, American Lutheran Church, and Association of Evangelical Lutheran Churches, which later merged in 1988 to form the Evangelical Lutheran Church in America. The LCMS began work on the LBW in 1965 as a revision of TLH of 1941 and the other Lutheran churches' book, the Service Book and Hymnal (SBH) of 1958 and invited other Lutheran denominations in North America to participate in the creation of the hymnal. Due to disagreements and compromise with some of the other denominations involved in the project, however, the LBW was published in 1978 without the endorsement of the very church body which initiated its production, when more conservative leaders assumed leadership after 1974 amidst a theological controversy and schism. Following the rejection of the LBW, the LCMS quickly set about revising the new hymnal to remove the objectionable content, and LW was published in 1982. Lutheran Worship includes orders for Holy Communion entitled Divine Service I (a revised and updated version of the old The Common Service liturgy of 1888, which influenced the further development of American Lutheran liturgies and was incorporated in The Common Service Book of 1917, adopted by the old United Lutheran Church in America, a predecessor of the LCA to 1962), Divine Service II (two settings, very similar to liturgies included in the LBW), and Divine Service III (a brief outline of a service based on Martin Luther's German Mass). It also includes orders for Matins, Vespers, and Compline, as well as services for Holy Baptism and Confirmation. There is also Morning Prayer, Evening Prayer, the Bidding Prayer, the Litany, the Lectionary, Luther's Small Catechism, Confession (Individual and Corporate), and a collection of Psalms. The bulk of the hymnal consists of 11 canticles and chants, 491 hymns, and 18 spiritual songs.

Despite the revisions undertaken by the LCMS, many members and congregations still rejected LW due to what many viewed as unnecessary and awkward modifications in language to well-known materials. Objections centered on the modifications made to Divine Service I and a number of well-known hymns. Following the precedent set by the LBW and the common trend around North American Christianity at the time, archaic language was widely updated, resulting in worshipers frequently stumbling over hymn verses and passages that had been familiar to them for many years. Examples of hymns that were significantly altered in the new hymnal include "My Faith Looks Up to Thee", "I Am Trusting Thee, Lord Jesus", and "We Give Thee But Thine Own", all of which are well-known and familiar hymns among Lutherans but were heavily modified in LW ("My Faith Looks Up to Thee" is perhaps the most notorious example of all, as its first line was changed to "My Faith Looks Trustingly"). Additionally, many familiar hymns were set to new melodies that proved unpopular. Examples include "Ride On, Ride On in Majesty", "The Day of Resurrection", and "God Loved the World So That He Gave". In many ways, LW proved to be a major contributor to the controversies that tore at the LCMS in the later part of the twentieth century, as the synod suddenly found itself lacking unity even in the hymnal used in its congregations. By 1999, only 58% of the synod was using LW as its primary hymnal, with the majority of the remaining congregations retaining TLH and a handful of others using LBW or other hymnals such as SBH.

Lutheran Worship is commonly referred to as the "Blue hymnal," because of its bound cover in contrast with TLH (or the SBH of 1958) - the "Red hymnal". The one notable exception to "Lutheran Worship" being blue is in the case of Concordia Lutheran Church in San Antonio, TX, whose founding pastor, the Reverend Doctor Guido Merkens, insisted at a synodical meeting that he wanted green covers. Not wanting to ruffle the feathers of the man who at that time had the fastest-growing LCMS church in the nation, a popular syndicated TV show known as "Breakthrough," and a "Television Sunday School" with a wide audience, the Synod and publishers relented, and hundreds of "Lutheran Worship" hymnals were produced in a dark green color to match the color scheme of Dr. Merkens' church. A new hymnal published in 2006, Lutheran Service Book, is intended to replace both LW and TLH as the common hymnal of the LCMS. Concordia Publishing House has announced that all LW-related supplemental materials, including specialized accompaniment and large-print editions and the agenda, will go out of print when current supplies are depleted, although the pew edition will continue to be produced for the foreseeable future. LW remains an official hymnal of the LCMS, and it is unlikely that it will ever be formally decommissioned.

== See also ==
- List of English-language hymnals by denomination
