= Christian Worship: Hymnal =

Hymnal of the Wisconsin Evangelical Lutheran Synod

- Christian Worship: HYMNAL
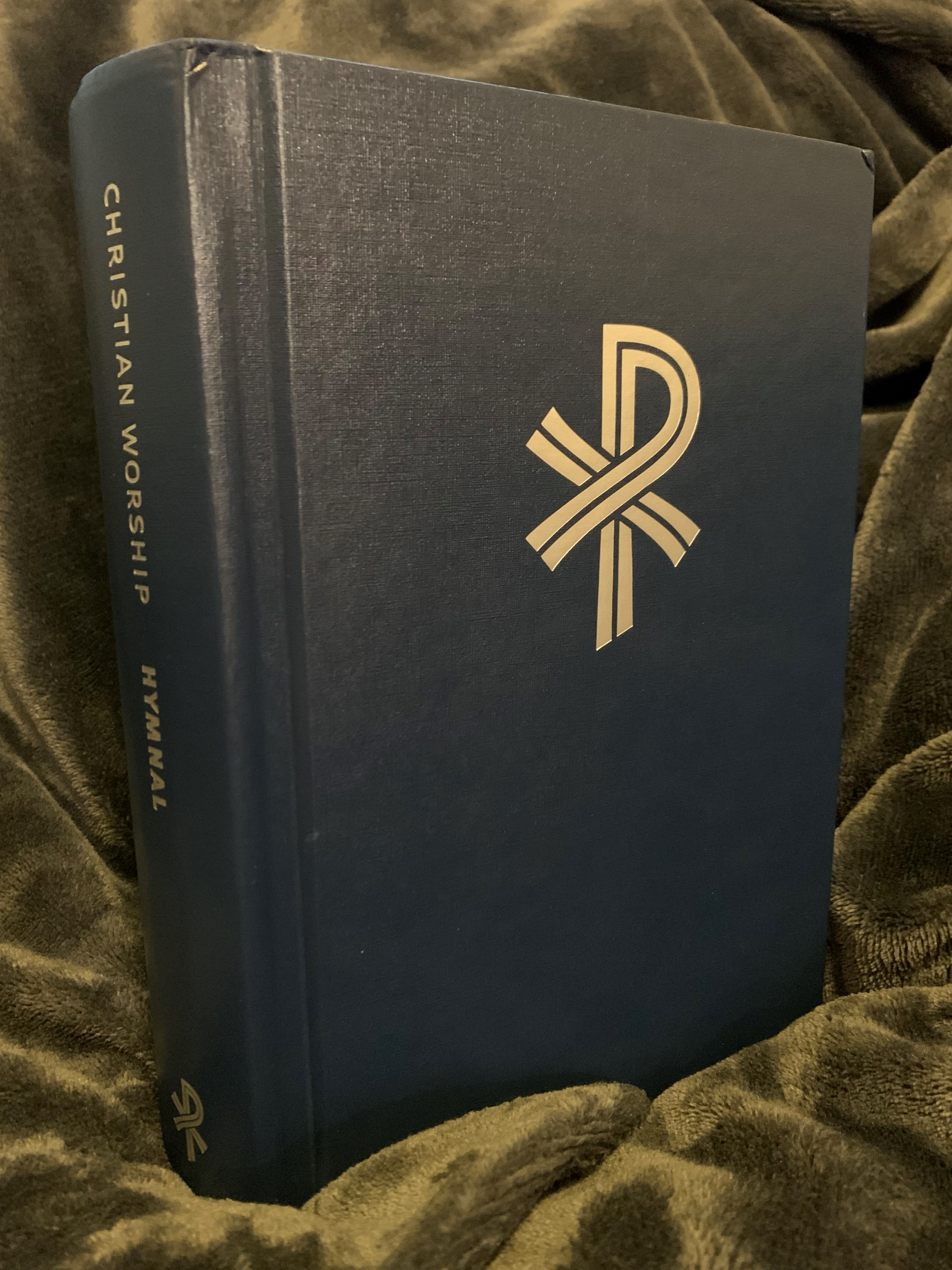
- The pew edition of Christian Worship: Hymnal
- Commissioned by: Wisconsin Evangelical Lutheran Synod
- Released: 2021
- Publisher: Northwestern Publishing House
- No. of Hymns: 657
- Psalms: 150
- Service music: Yes
← Christian Worship	

Christian Worship: Hymnal is the most recent hymnal authorized by the Wisconsin Evangelical Lutheran Synod (WELS). It was published in 2021 by Northwestern Publishing House (NPH), the official publisher of the WELS, and intended to replace Christian Worship: A Lutheran Hymnal. The WELS Hymnal Project Executive Committee began preparations for the hymnal in 2013; the project chairman was Jon Zabell and the project director was Michael Schultz.

NPH maintains a listing of omissions and musical errors in the first edition of the Hymnal and auxiliary books. A notable omission in the first printing of the pew edition is Prayers for Worship, which were intended to be printed on the inside front cover of the hymnal. NPH provides a PDF of this page that can be printed and affixed inside the cover of a first edition pew hymnal.

== Editions ==
In addition to the pew edition, several auxiliary books are available:

Core Volumes:

- Christian Worship: Hymnal
- Christian Worship: Accompaniment for Hymns
- Christian Worship: Accompaniment for Services

Expanded Resources

- Christian Worship: Psalter
- Christian Worship: Accompaniment for the Psalter
- Christian Worship: Altar Book
- Christian Worship: Agenda

Support Resources

- Christian Worship: Foundations
- Christian Worship: Musicians’ Manual
- Christian Worship: Guidebook
- Our Worth to Him: Devotions for Christian Worship

Preaching Resources

- Commentary on the Propers, Year A
- Commentary on the Propers, Year B
- Commentary on the Propers, Year C

Digital

- Musician's Resource
- Service Builder

== Christian Worship: Service Builder ==
The hymnal offers an application called Christian Worship: Service Builder, developed by Concordia Technology, to plan worship and produce service folders or slide presentations for use during worship. The worship planners have the options to choose a day from the lectionary calendar, choose an order of service, customized liturgical options, and hymns. The software offers an indefinite free trial, however an annual subscription is required to export data.

A module called Playlist was added to Service Builder after its initial release, intended as the successor to HymnSoft, for an additional annual subscription fee.

== See also ==
- List of English-language hymnals by denomination
