= Media vita in morte sumus =

Gregorian chant

Media vita in morte sumus (Latin for "In the midst of life we are in death") is a Gregorian chant, known by its incipit, written in the form of a response, and known as "Antiphona pro Peccatis" or "de Morte". The most accepted source is a New Year's Eve religious service in the 1300s. Reference has been made to a source originating in a battle song of the year 912 by Notker the Stammerer, a monk of the Abbey of Saint Gall. After the song had been used as an incantation, the Diocesan Synod of Cologne declared in 1316 no one should sing it without prior permission of the residing bishop.

== Text ==
Media vita in morte sumus
quem quærimus adiutorem
nisi te, Domine,
qui pro peccatis nostris
juste irasceris?

Sancte Deus,
sancte fortis,
sancte et misericors Salvator:
amaræ morti ne tradas nos.

In te speraverunt patres nostri
Speraverunt et liberasti eos

In the midst of life we are in death
of whom may we seek for succour,
but of thee, O Lord,
who for our sins
art justly displeased?

Holy God,
Holy mighty,
Holy and merciful Saviour,
deliver us not unto bitter death.

In you, our fathers placed their hopes
They placed their hopes and you freed them

The English translation is a poetic adaption from the Book of Common Prayer.

== Latin liturgical use ==
In the York Breviary "Media vita" was sung as an antiphon at Compline on the Fourth Sunday of Lent, Laetare. In the Sarum Breviary it was the antiphon from the Third (Oculi) to the Fifth (Judica) Sundays of Lent, a position it also occupies (in reduced format) in the Dominican Rite.

In addition to its uses in the liturgy, "Media vita" was sung as a hymn to ask God for aid in times of public need. In 1455 a group of nuns in Wennigsen, resisting the attempt of the Augustinian canon Johannes Busch and Duke William of Brunswick to reform their house, "lay down on their bellies in the choir with the arms and legs stretched out in the form of a cross, and bawled all through, at the top of their voices, the anthem "In the midst of life we are in death" ... Wherefore the Duke was afraid, and feared lest his whole land should go to ruin." Busch assured the Duke that no harm could come from the chant, so he responded to the nuns: "How were ye not afraid to sing the anthem "Media vita" over me? I stretch my fingers to God's holy gospels, and swear that ye must reform yourselves, or I will not suffer you in my land."

In the Ambrosian Rite, "Media vita" was said with the Litany of the Saints on the Tuesday before Christmas, the Wednesday before Palm Sunday, and the Greater Rogation on 25 April.

== Adaptations ==
Popular in the Baroque period, the Latin phrase was translated into the vernacular early and has continued to circulate especially widely in German and English, in literature and in song.

=== German ===
"Media vita" appears in Hartmann von Aue's Middle High German narrative poem Der arme Heinrich (V. 93f.).

In 1524, Martin Luther translated it as "Mitten wir im Leben sind" and consequently it is now in the Evangelisches Gesangbuch hymnbook as number 518, or 654 in the Gotteslob hymnbook.

It is echoed in Rainer Maria Rilke's poem "Schlußstück": "Der Tod ist groß [...] Wenn wir uns mitten im Leben meinen/ wagt er zu weinen/ mitten in uns." as well as in the title of Hermann Hesse's poem, "Media in vita".

=== English ===
The Latin phrase was translated by Archbishop of Canterbury Thomas Cranmer, whose English-language version became part of the burial service in the Book of Common Prayer. Cranmer's contemporary and fellow Anglican bishop Miles Coverdale wrote a poetic rendering of Luther's "Mytten wir ym leben synd", beginning "In the myddest of our lyvynge." Catherine Winkworth made another English version of "Mytten wir ym leben synd" in her Lyra Germanica: Hymns for the Sundays and Chief Festivals of the Christian Year, beginning "In the midst of life, behold."

=== Music ===
The Book of Common Prayer text of "In the midst of life we are in death" has been set to music in the Booke of Common praier noted (1550) by John Merbecke and in Music for the Funeral of Queen Mary by Henry Purcell. A well-known adaptation is the 1550s choral work Media vita in morte sumus by John Sheppard. The text also comprises the first half of a 1573 motet by Orlande de Lassus.

The passage is also included in the verse of the “Agnus Dei” movement of John Rutter’s Requiem.

In popular music, the phrase "In the midst of life we are in 'debt' et cetera" is repeated in The Smiths' 1986 single "Sweet and Tender Hooligan".

=== Videogames ===
The main menu music from the game Manor Lords is titled after the chant and uses its first three lines.

The videogame Postal features the chant in its final level, the Elementary School, as its theme. It omits the last line, amarae morti ne tradas nos.
