= Evangelical Lutheran Synod =

United States Lutheran denomination

- Classification: Protestant
- Orientation: Confessional Lutheran
- Scripture: Bible
- Theology: Conservative
- Polity: Congregationalist polity
- Associations: Confessional Evangelical Lutheran Conference
- Headquarters: Mankato, Minnesota, US
- Origin: 1918; Lake Mills, Iowa, US
- Congregations: 130
- Members: 16,000
- Official website: els.org

The Evangelical Lutheran Synod (ELS) is a US-based Protestant Christian denomination based in Mankato, Minnesota. It describes itself as a conservative, Confessional Lutheran body. The ELS has 130 congregations and has missions in Peru, Chile, India, South Korea, Ukraine, Czech Republic, and Latvia.

The ELS is in fellowship with the Wisconsin Evangelical Lutheran Synod (WELS) and is a member of the international Confessional Evangelical Lutheran Conference (CELC).

== Core beliefs ==
The Evangelical Lutheran Synod teaches that the Bible is the only authoritative and error-free source for doctrine. It subscribes to the Lutheran Confessions (the Book of Concord) not with a quatenus (in-so-far-as) but instead a quia (because) subscription; that is, it subscribes to the Lutheran Confessions because it is an accurate presentation of what scripture teaches. It teaches that Jesus is the center of scripture and the only way to eternal salvation, and that the Holy Spirit uses the gospel alone in Word and Sacraments (Baptism and Holy Communion) to bring people to faith in Jesus as savior and keep them in that faith, strengthening them in their daily life of sanctification.

== Membership ==
In 2023, the ELS had an estimated number of 16,000 baptized members. The ELS also has 130 congregations and missions in Peru, Chile, India, South Korea, Ukraine, Czech Republic, and Latvia. Note that the ELS uses the term synod differently from the Evangelical Lutheran Church in America and is a separate denomination.

== History ==
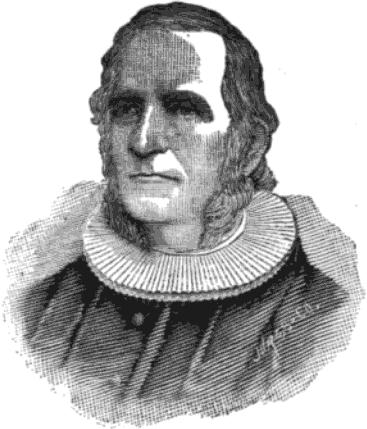
Herman Amberg Preus, (1825–1894), a key figure in organizing the Norwegian Synod.

The Evangelical Lutheran Synod traces its history back to 1853 when the Norwegian Synod was organized in the Midwestern United States. They practiced "fellowship", a form of full communion, with the Lutheran Church–Missouri Synod (LCMS) during the 1850s and 1860s. In 1872, they along with the LCMS and the WELS formed the Evangelical Lutheran Synodical Conference of North America.

In 1917, the Norwegian Synod merged with two other Norwegian Lutheran groups and formed the Norwegian Lutheran Church of America, later named the Evangelical Lutheran Church. This led to disagreement among members of the Norwegian Synod. The people who became the ELS had concerns regarding fellowship with those who did not share the same doctrine. The Norwegian Synod had taught that conversion and salvation were entirely the work of God without any cooperation from humans. The new merged church allowed that conversion depended in some degree on humans accepting God's grace. A group of people therefore gathered at Lime Creek Lutheran Church near Lake Mills, Iowa, on June 14, 1918, and reorganized as the Norwegian Synod of the American Evangelical Lutheran Church (also known as "Little Norwegian" Synod) The name was changed to the Evangelical Lutheran Synod on June 25, 1957.

In 1955, the ELS suspended its fellowship with the LCMS over doctrinal disagreements, and in 1963, it withdrew from the Evangelical Lutheran Synodical Conference of North America. It retained its fellowship with the WELS. (The WELS severed its fellowship relations with the LCMS in 1961, and also withdrew from the Synodical Conference in 1963.)

In 1993, the ELS and WELS, working with a number of other worldwide Lutheran churches, some of which had been founded through mission work by both synods, founded the Confessional Evangelical Lutheran Conference (CELC).

The ELS published a hymnal, the Evangelical Lutheran Hymnary, in 1996. This hymnal is in the tradition of the 1941 The Lutheran Hymnal as well as earlier Scandinavian hymnals.

=== Association of Confessional Lutheran Churches ===
The Association of Confessional Lutheran Churches (ACLC) was established in the early part of the 21st century to meet the needs of Lutheran congregations that departed from the Evangelical Lutheran Synod when they considered a pastor to have been wrongly removed by that body. The root purpose of the ACLC, then, is to maintain a pool of pastors from which member congregations can call. There are two member churches.

== ELS presidents ==
- Bjug Harstad (1917–1922)
- George Gullixson (1922–1926)
- Christian Anderson (1926–1930)
- Helge M. Tjernagel (1930–1934)
- Norman A. Madson (1934–1935)
- Christian A. Moldstad (1935–1937)
- Henry Ingebritson (1937–1942)
- Norman A. Madson (1942–1946)
- Adolph M. Harstad (1946–1950)
- C. Monrad Gullerud (1950–1954)
- Milton H. Otto (1954–1957)
- Milton E. Tweit (1957–1962)
- Theodore Aaberg (1962–1964)
- Joseph Petersen (1964–1966)
- Juul B. Madson (1966–1970)
- George M. Orvick (1970–1976)
- Wilhelm Petersen (1976–1980)
- George M. Orvick (1980–2002)
- John A. Moldstad (2002–2021)
- Glenn Obenberger (2021–2026)
- Michael Smith (2026-)

== Education ministries and missions ==
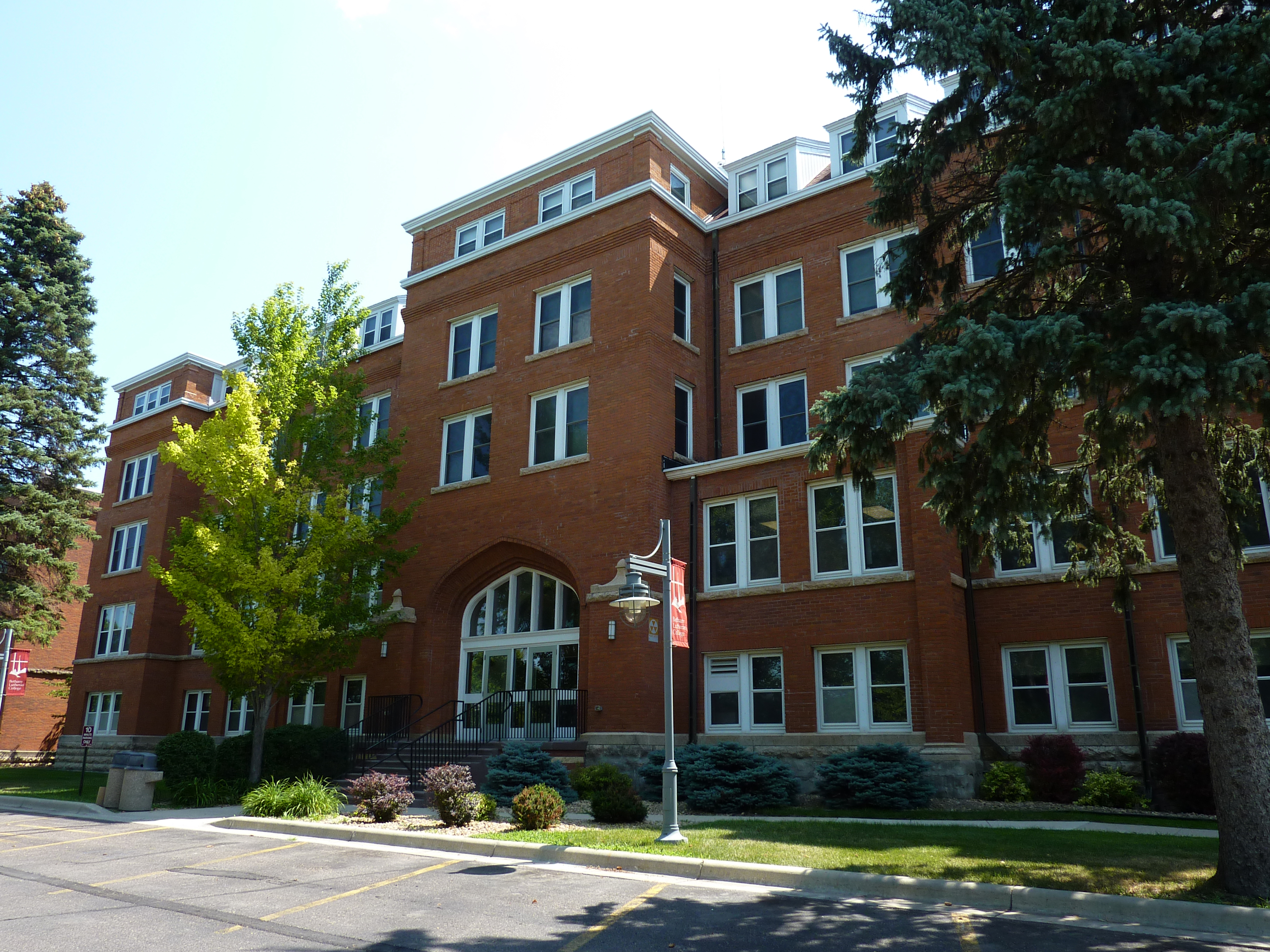
Bethany Lutheran College in Mankato, Minnesota

In 1927, the ELS formed Bethany Lutheran College in Mankato, Minnesota. In 1946, it established its own seminary, also in Mankato, called Bethany Lutheran Theological Seminary. Throughout its history, ELS congregations have actively sponsored Christian elementary schools.

The synod carries on an active home mission program and now has 130 congregations in many states. It also has foreign missionaries in Peru and Chile in South America and in Ukraine, Latvia, and the Czech Republic (Czech Evangelical Lutheran Church) in Eastern Europe.

== See also ==
- Evangelical Heritage Version
