= The Lutheran Hymnal =

1941 Lutheran hymnal of the LCMS and WELS

- Commissioned by: Evangelical Lutheran Synodical Conference of North America
- Approved for: Lutheran Church–Missouri Synod; Wisconsin Evangelical Lutheran Synod; Evangelical Lutheran Synod; Synod of Evangelical Lutheran Churches
- Released: 1941
- Publisher: Concordia Publishing House
- Pages: 858
- No. of Hymns: 668
- Psalms: Yes
- Service music: Yes
| ←: Book of Hymns (WELS); Evangelical Lutheran Hymn-Book (LCMS) | Christian Worship (WELS); Evangelical Lutheran Hymnary (ELS); Worship Supplement (LCMS supplement, see below); → |

- Worship Supplement
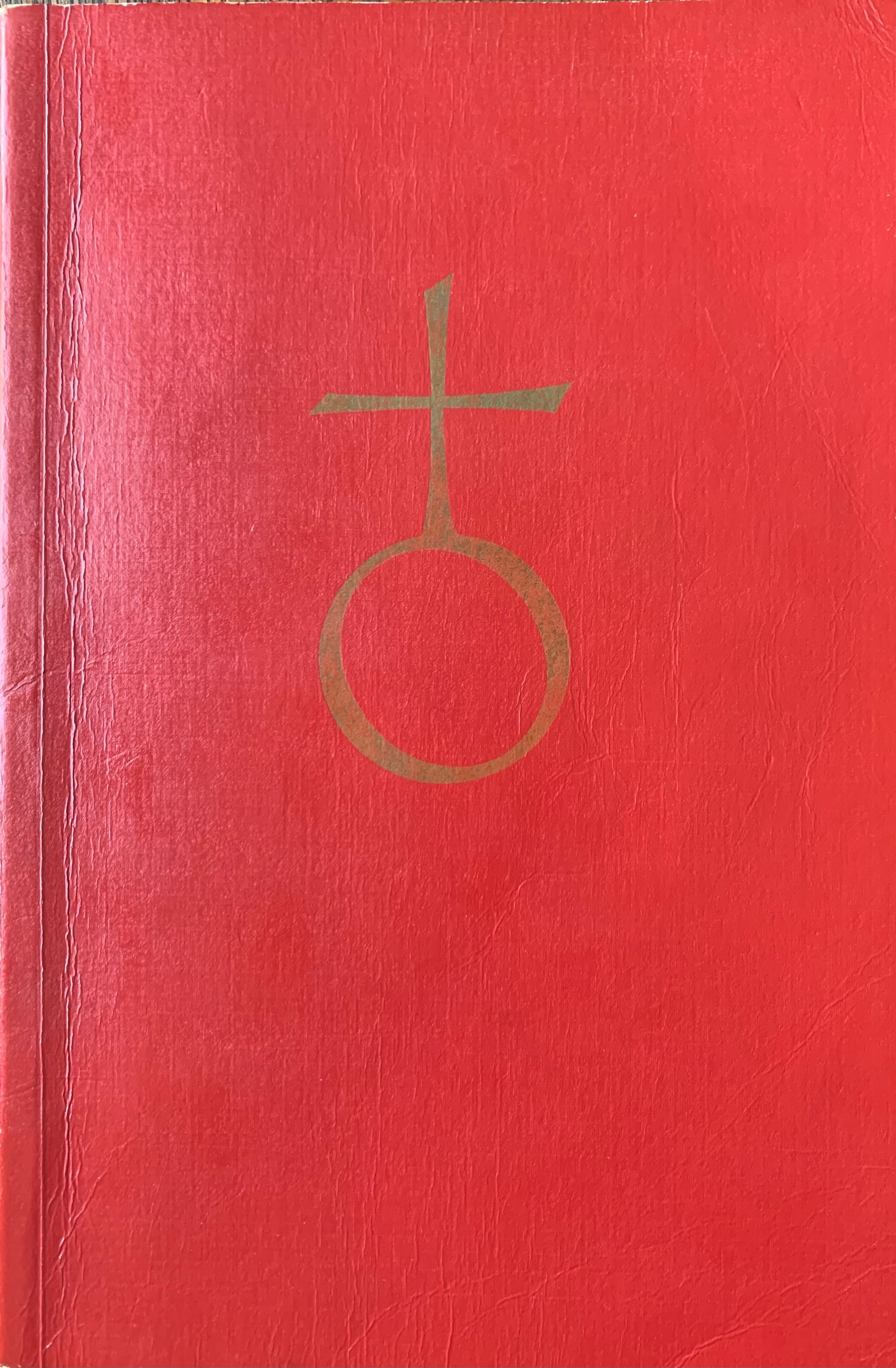
- Commissioned by: Lutheran Church – Missouri Synod, Commission on Worship
- Approved for: Lutheran Church – Missouri Synod
- Released: 1969
- Publisher: Concordia Publishing House
- Pages: 253
- No. of Hymns: 92
- Service music: Yes
| ← The Lutheran Hymnal | Lutheran Book of Worship (AELC) Lutheran Worship (LCMS) → |

The Lutheran Hymnal (TLH) is a hymnal first published in 1941 by Concordia Publishing House in St. Louis, Missouri, for the Evangelical Lutheran Synodical Conference of North America. Its development had been started by the conference's largest member, the Lutheran Church – Missouri Synod (LCMS), as a replacement for that denomination's first official English-language hymnal, the 1912 Evangelical Lutheran Hymn-Book. In 1969, the LCMS published the Worship Supplement containing additional hymns and service music.

== History ==
Shortly after the 1929 LCMS synodical convention, LCMS president Friedrich Pfotenhauer appointed a Committee on Hymnology and Liturgics to develop a revision of the Evangelical Lutheran Hymn-Book that had been published in 1912 and revised several times thereafter. This committee, chaired by professor William G. Pollock of Concordia Seminary, first met in November of that year. The second meeting, in January 1930, included representatives of the other synods in the Evangelical Lutheran Synodical Conference of North America—the Wisconsin Evangelical Lutheran Synod (WELS), the Evangelical Lutheran Synod (ELS), and the Synod of Evangelical Lutheran Churches (known then as the Slovak Synod)—and the name of the committee was changed to the Synodical Conference Hymn Book Committee.

During the next four years, the committee worked on hymn texts and tunes. Subcommittees were set up to focus on categories of hymns such as German-language, Scandinavian, English and Australian, and ancient and medieval. Hymnals currently in use by the synods were examined to find hymns that needed to be included. A music subcommittee worked to choose which tunes and tune variants would be used.

In 1934, a subcommittee on liturgics was appointed to develop the various church services that would be included in the hymnal.

TLH was published in 1941 by the LCMS's Concordia Publishing House under the authority of the Synodical Conference. It contains 668 chorales, hymns, carols, and chants, plus the liturgy for the Common Service, Matins, Vespers, and propers, collects, prayers, suffrages, canticles, psalms, and miscellaneous tables.

The first attempt to replace TLH began in 1965. In 1966, LCMS President Oliver Harms invited other interested Lutheran church bodies to form the Inter-Lutheran Commission on Worship (ILCW). Members of the ILCW included the Lutheran Church in America {LCA), the American Lutheran Church (ALC), the Evangelical Lutheran Church of Canada, and the LCMS. In the following decade, the LCMS experienced significant turmoil, including the Seminex controversy and the breaking away of a group of congregations to form the Association of Evangelical Lutheran Churches (AELC). Shortly before the new hymnal was published, objections were raised within the LCMS to some of its content. Ultimately, Lutheran Book of Worship was published in 1978 for use in the AELC, the ALC, and the LCA without the LCMS' endorsement, although some LCMS congregations adopted it. An LCMS revision of LBW was quickly published in 1982 under the title Lutheran Worship (LW) and was intended to replace TLH as the main hymnal of the LCMS; however, many congregations were unsatisfied with the final product, leading them to continue using TLH. According to a 1999 survey by the LCMS Commission on Worship, approximately 36% of the synod's congregations were still using TLH as their main hymnal, and even more were continuing to use it in combination with LW and/or other hymnals and hymnal supplements. An even newer hymnal, Lutheran Service Book (LSB) was published in 2006 that restored many of the features of TLH in the hope that more widespread use could be achieved.

In the Wisconsin Evangelical Lutheran Synod, TLH was effectively replaced by Christian Worship: A Lutheran Hymnal in 1993, and few congregations continue to use it on a regular basis. The Evangelical Lutheran Synod published a new hymnal, Evangelical Lutheran Hymnary, in 1996.

The initial editions of TLH were bound in blue, and the hymnal has been simultaneously available in both red and blue cover versions for much of its history. The red cover version is now more common. The widespread use of Lutheran Service Book has begun the process of resolving the LCMS' hymnal controversy, as initial reviews have been generally quite favorable. Concordia Publishing House has announced that all TLH-related supplemental materials, including specialized accompaniment editions and the agenda, will go out of print when current supplies are depleted, but it plans to continue to produce the pew edition for the foreseeable future. TLH remains an officially authorized hymnal of the synod.

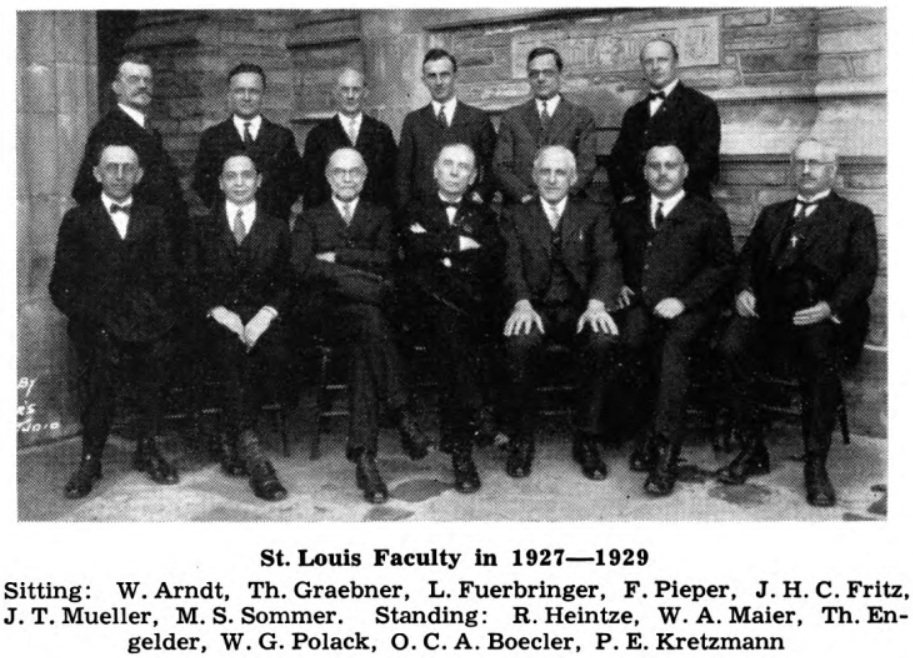
W.G. Polack, the editor of The Lutheran Hymnal, is standing in the back row, the fourth from the left.

== See also ==
- List of English-language hymnals by denomination
