= Evangelical Lutheran Worship =

2006 Lutheran hymnal used by the ELCA

- The pew edition of Evangelical Lutheran Worship (2006)
- Commissioned by: Evangelical Lutheran Church in America
- Approved for: Evangelical Lutheran Church in America, Evangelical Lutheran Church in Canada
- Released: 2006
- Publisher: Augsburg Fortress
- Pages: 1211
- No. of Hymns: 654
- Psalms: 150
- Service music: 14 (10 Communion settings, one for Service of the Word, three for the Divine Office)
| ← Lutheran Book of Worship (1978) | All Creation Sings (Supplement, see below) → |

- All Creation Sings
- Commissioned by: Evangelical Lutheran Church in America
- Approved for: Evangelical Lutheran Church in America, Evangelical Lutheran Church in Canada
- Released: 2020
- Publisher: Augsburg Fortress
- No. of Hymns: 200
- Service music: 2 Communion settings, one for Service of the Word
| ← Evangelical Lutheran Worship (2006) | |

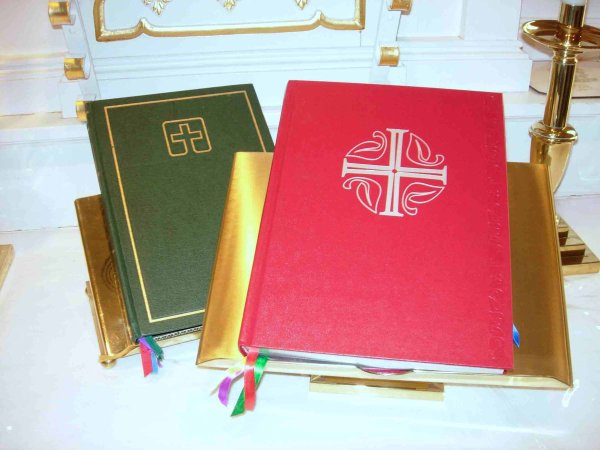
The altar book editions of the Lutheran Book of Worship (1978), (green) and Evangelical Lutheran Worship (2006), (red)

Evangelical Lutheran Worship (ELW) is the current primary liturgical and worship guidebook and hymnal for use in the Evangelical Lutheran Church in America (ELCA) and the Evangelical Lutheran Church in Canada (ELCIC). It was first published in October 2006 by the ELCA's publishing house, Augsburg Fortress. The new worship resource replaced its predecessor of 28 years before, the Lutheran Book of Worship (LBW) of 1978, and that hymnal's supplements: Hymnal Supplement 1991, published by GIA Publications, a Roman Catholic publishing house, and With One Voice (WOV), published by Augsburg Fortress in 1995. The supplement All Creation Sings was published in 2020.

Evangelical Lutheran Worship has a cranberry cover and graphic cross logo. Though not all ELCA and ELCIC congregations immediately adopted the book, demand for it was so great that it sold out its first and second printings and some congregations had to delay its adoption until more were available.

The book includes ten musical settings of the liturgy for the Divine Service / Holy Communion service, three of which were previously published in the LBW, as well as a Service of the Word. Morning Prayer (Matins), Evening Prayer (Vespers), and Night Prayer (Compline) are all included, as are occasional and pastoral offices such as baptism, marriage, burial, individual and corporate confession, and proper services for Ash Wednesday, Palm Sunday, and the Triduum of Easter, Martin Luther's Small Catechism is also printed in the book. A Prayer of the Day (Collect) is included for each Sunday of the three-year cycle of the new Common Lectionary. Unlike the abbreviated Psalter included in the LBW, the ELW includes the entire Book of Psalms in a version for congregational prayer and singing. Compared to the LBW, the selection of hymns is expanded, including many options from many of Evangelical Lutheran worship/liturgical service books, hymnals and hymnal supplements published in America in the last two centuries.

In 2020, a supplement named All Creation Sings was published. It has two musical settings of the Holy Communion, a Service of the Word (similar to LBW and WOV), and new hymns and songs.

== See also ==
- List of English-language hymnals by denomination
