= Lutheran Book of Worship =

Lutheran hymnal used in North America

- 1978 edition of the Lutheran Book of Worship
- Commissioned by: Inter-Lutheran Commission on Worship
- Approved for: Lutheran Church in America, The American Lutheran Church, Evangelical Lutheran Church of Canada, Lutheran Church—Missouri Synod (officially withdrew)
- Released: 1978
- Publisher: Augsburg Fortress
- Pages: 960
- No. of Hymns: 569
- Psalms: 150
- Service music: Yes
| ← Service Book and Hymnal; The Lutheran Hymnal | Lutheran Worship (LCMS); Hymnal Supplement 1991 (ELCA supplement, see below) → |

- Hymnal Supplement 1991
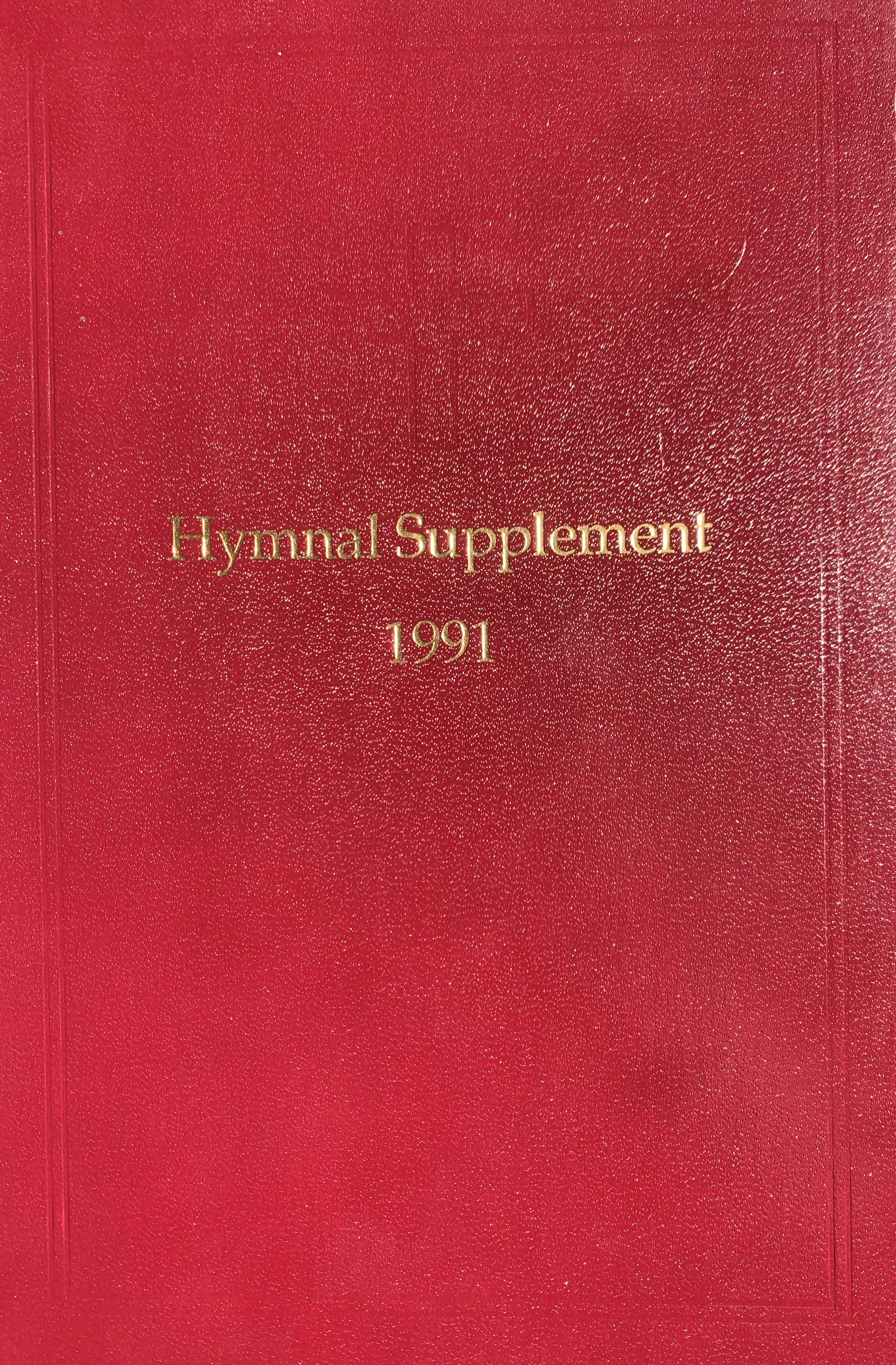
- Hymnal Supplement 1991
- Released: 1991
- Publisher: GIA Publications
- No. of Hymns: 7 canticles and chants, 118 Hymns
- Psalms: 13
- Service music: Yes
| ← Lutheran Book of Worship | With One Voice (ELCA supplement, see below) → |

- With One Voice
- 1995 edition of With One Voice
- Approved for: Evangelical Lutheran Church in America
- Released: 1995
- Publisher: Augsburg Fortress
- No. of Hymns: 207
- Service music: Yes
| ← Lutheran Book of Worship | Evangelical Lutheran Worship (ELCA); ReClaim Hymnal (LCMC, NALC) → |

The Lutheran Book of Worship (LBW) is a worship book and hymnal published in 1978 and was authorized for use by several Lutheran denominations in North America, including predecessors of the Evangelical Lutheran Church in America and Evangelical Lutheran Church in Canada. The Lutheran Church—Missouri Synod was initially involved in the hymnal's development but officially withdrew.

Additional hymns and service music are contained in the companions Hymnal Supplement 1991 and With One Voice (WOV). A successor was published in 2006 titled Evangelical Lutheran Worship, although Lutheran Book of Worship remains in use by some congregations.

The LBW is sometimes called the "green book", as opposed to With One Voice, which is bound in blue, or the older Service Book and Hymnal and The Lutheran Hymnal, which were bound in red.

== History ==
When Lutheran churches were first established in North America, the immigrants from Germany, Sweden, Norway, Finland, and other non-English-speaking countries retained services in their native languages. However, as the children and grandchildren of these immigrants began speaking English in their everyday lives and the various Lutheran denominations began uniting, many felt that the North American Lutheran churches needed a common English-language liturgy and hymns. Although the eighteenth-century missionary Henry Melchior Muhlenberg had hoped for the day when Lutherans would be "one church [with] one book", it was not until the 1888 "Common Service" that a majority of English-speaking Lutherans in North America began to use the same texts for worship, albeit with minor adaptations. (Senn, 584–591.) The "Common Liturgy" included in the 1958 Service Book and Hymnal was a major revision of the "Common Service", and introduced a Eucharistic Prayer into American Lutheran usage. Culto Cristiano, a 1964 service book, attempted to offer a unified liturgy for Spanish-speaking Lutherans.

The process leading to the publication of the LBW was started in 1965 when the Lutheran Church–Missouri Synod (LCMS) invited other North American Lutheran denominations to join it to work on a common service book. Together with the LCMS, the Lutheran Church in America, the American Lutheran Church, and the Evangelical Lutheran Church of Canada formed the Inter-Lutheran Commission on Worship to undertake this project. The commission conducted its work through four sub-committees: Liturgical Text Committee, Liturgical Music Committee, Hymn Text Committee, Hymn Music Committee. The work of the committees was validated via provisional liturgical and hymn materials, questionnaires, conferences, and dialogs. The Rev. Dr. Eugene Brand was named project director for the development work and The Rev. Leonard Flachman was named publishers' representative and managing editor. The LBW was published in 1978. The LCMS pulled out of the ILCW just prior to the publication of the LBW, but having been a participant in the development of the materials its name appears on the title page. The LCMS published its own hymnal, Lutheran Worship (LW), in 1982. Although the LW liturgies are very similar to those in the LBW, there are differences which reflect differing theologies. For example, LW lacks the option for a Eucharistic Prayer.

The Lutheran Book of Worship has remained in service for more than forty years. There are a couple reasons for that longevity. The first is the careful, forward-looking, inclusive work of the ILCW and the four subcommittees. The second is the careful work done by the staff of Augsburg Publishing House in selecting and testing the materials with which the book was manufactured; the books did not wear out.

The first printing of the LBW was one million copies and required 19 semi-trailers to carry the book from the printer to 14 distribution points around the United States.

While it is in its twenty-seventh printing and widely used by the ELCA and the ELCIC, the LBW was replaced in October 2006 as the primary worship resource in the two denominations by Evangelical Lutheran Worship. The new book is intended to reflect the changing demographic of the church bodies and the subsequent changes in language and ritual practice.

== See also ==
- List of English-language hymnals by denomination
