= List of religious texts =

The following is a non-exhaustive list of links to specific religious texts which may be used for further, more in-depth study.

== Bronze Age ==
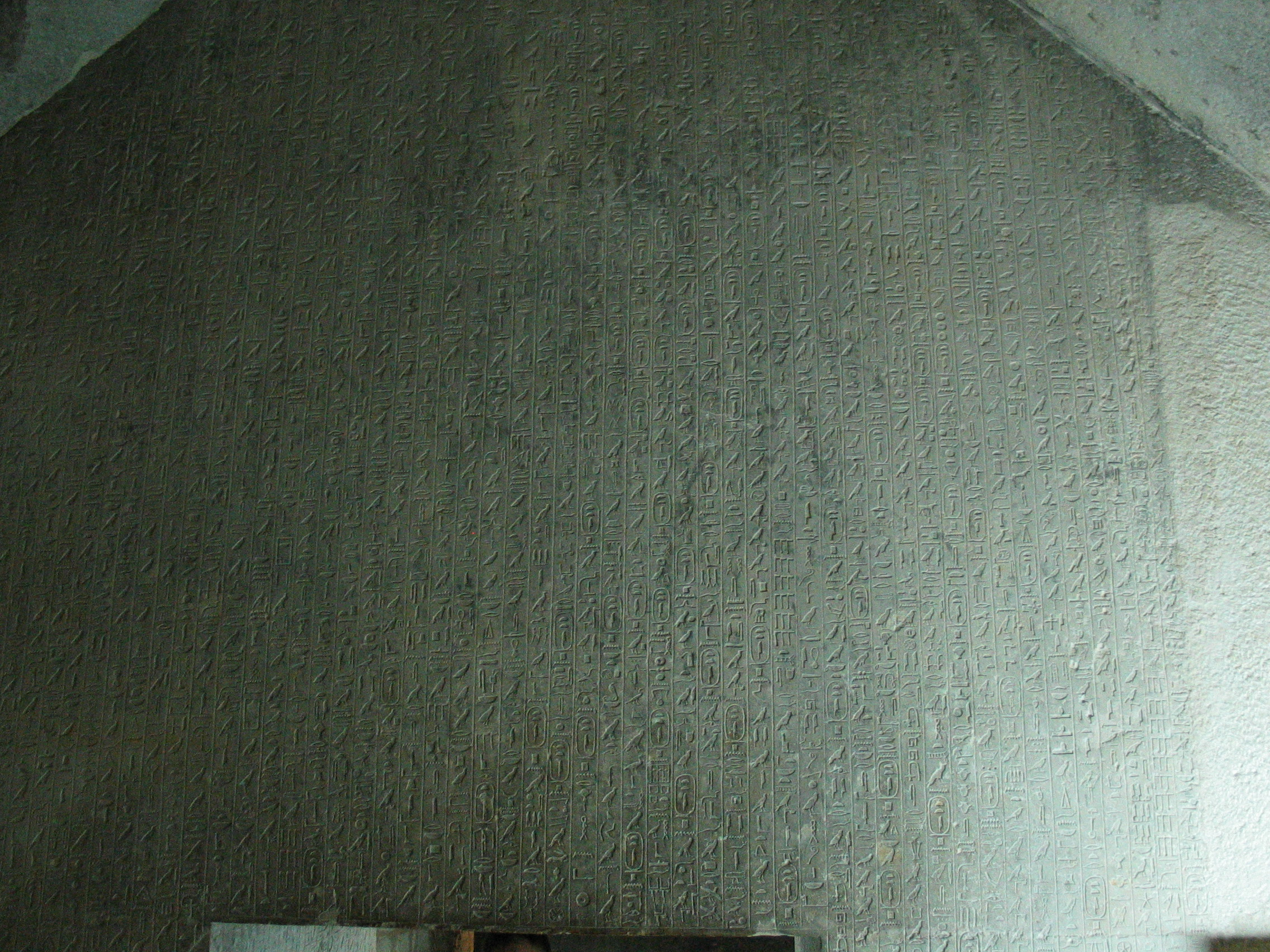
Pyramid Texts from Teti I's pyramid.

=== Ancient Egyptian religion ===
- Pyramid Texts
- Coffin Texts
- Book of the Dead
- Book of Caverns
- Book of Gates
- Amduat
- Book of the Heavenly Cow
- Book of the Earth
- Litany of Re
- The Contendings of Horus and Seth
- Atenism: Great Hymn to the Aten

=== Sumerian religion ===
- Hymn to Enlil
- Kesh Temple Hymn
- Song of the hoe
- Debate between Winter and Summer
- Epic of Gilgamesh
- Epic of Enmerkar
  - Enmerkar and the Lord of Aratta
  - Enmerkar and En-suhgir-ana
- Epic of Lugalbanda
  - Lugalbanda in the Mountain Cave
  - Lugalbanda and the Anzud Bird
- Angim
- Enki and the World Order
- Enlil and Ninlil
- Enlil and Namzitara
- Inanna and Utu
- Inanna Prefers the Farmer
- Inanna and Enki
- Inanna Takes Command of Heaven
- Inanna and Ebih
- Inanna and Shukaletuda
- Inanna and Bilulu
- Inanna's Descent into the Underworld
- Ninurta's Journey to Eridu

=== Babylonian religion ===
- Enūma Eliš
- Epic of Gilgamesh
- Agushaya Hymn
- Atra-Hasis
- Labbu myth
- Nergal and Ereshkigal
- Epic of Erra
- Enmesharra's Defeat
- Anzû and the Tablet of Destinies

=== Canaanite religion ===
- Baal Cycle
- Legend of Keret
- Tale of Aqhat

== Classical antiquity ==
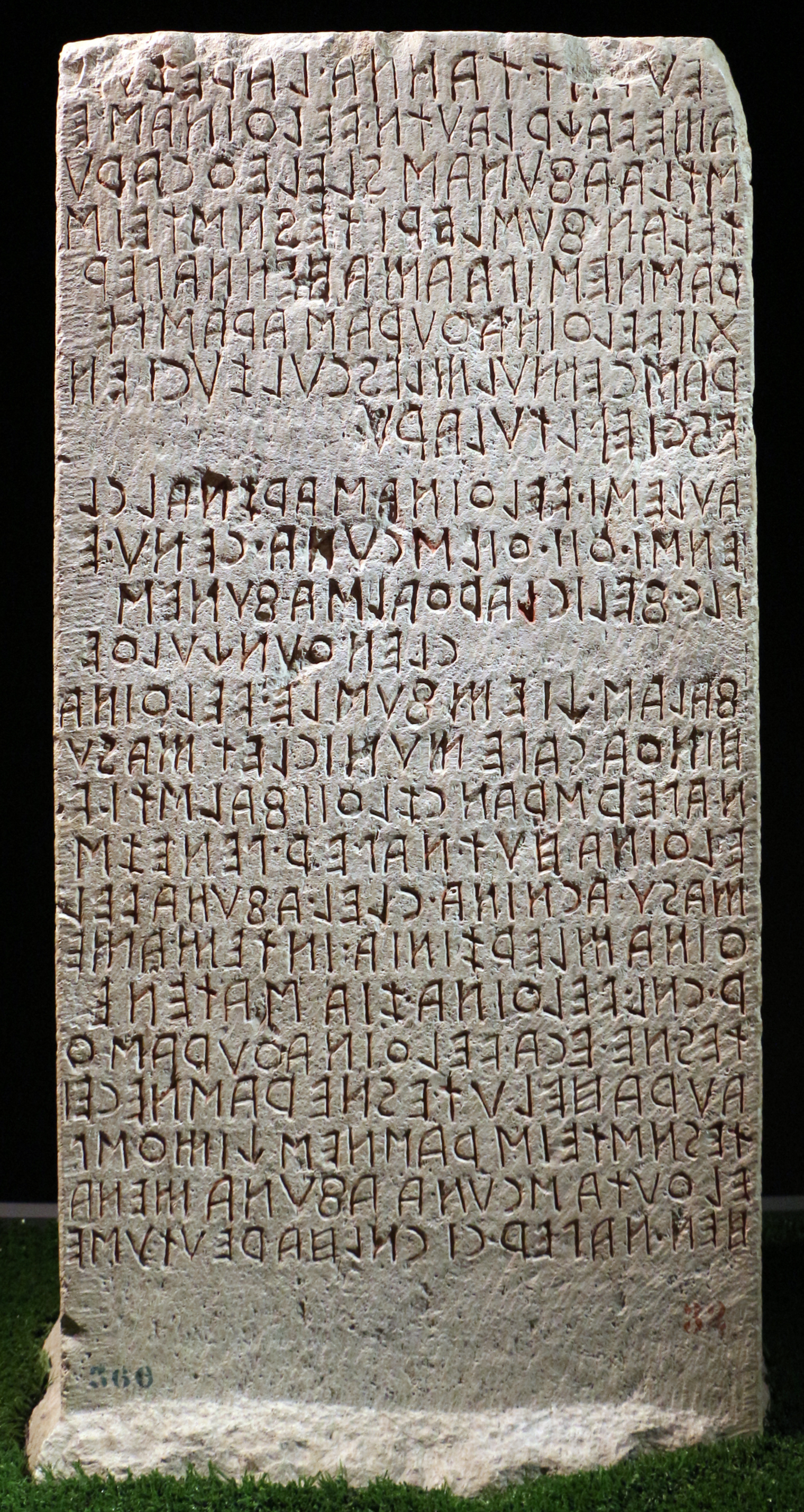
The Cippus of Perugia, 3rd or 2nd century BCE

=== Etruscan religion ===
- Liber Linteus
- Pyrgi Tablets

=== Ancient Greek religion ===
- Aretalogy
- Argonautica
- Bibliotheca
- Derveni papyrus
- Ehoiai
- Homeric Hymns
- Iliad
- Odyssey
- Telegony
- The golden verses of Pythagoras
- Delphic maxims
- Theogony
- Works and Days
- Epic Cycle
- Theban Cycle

=== Hermeticism ===
- Hermetica
- Emerald Tablet
- Asclepius

=== Mandaeism ===
Main texts:

- Ginza Rabba
  - Right Ginza
  - Left Ginza
- Mandaean Book of John
- Qulasta

Ritual texts:

- The Wedding of the Great Shishlam
- Scroll of the Parwanaya
- Scroll of the Great Baptism
- Scroll of the Ancestors
- Zihrun Raza Kasia

Esoteric texts:

- The Thousand and Twelve Questions
- Scroll of Exalted Kingship
- The Coronation of the Great Shishlam
- Alma Rišaia Rba
- Alma Rišaia Zuṭa
- The Baptism of Hibil Ziwa
- Scroll of Abatur
- Dmut Kušṭa
- Secrets of the Ancestors
- Scroll of the Rivers
- Book of the Zodiac

Historical texts:

- Haran Gawaita

Others:

- Incantation bowls
- Lead rolls

=== Manichaeism ===
- Gospel of Mani
- Treasure of Life
- Pragmateia
- The Book of Giants
- Fundamental Epistle
- Manichaean Psalter
- Shabuhragan
- Arzhang
- Kephalaia, found in Coptic translation.

=== Orphism ===
- Derveni papyrus
- Orphic literature
- Orphic Hymns

== East Asian religions ==
=== Confucianism ===
The Four Books and Five Classics:

- The Five Classics (I Ching, Book of Documents, Classic of Poetry, Book of Rites, Spring and Autumn Annals)
- The Four Books (Great Learning, Doctrine of the Mean, Analects, Mencius)

The Thirteen Classics (I Ching, Book of Documents, Classic of Poetry, Rites of Zhou, Etiquette and Ceremonial, Book of Rites, The Commentary of Zuo, The Commentary of Gongyang, The Commentary of Guliang, The Analects, Classic of Filial Piety, Erya, Mencius)

=== Taoism ===
- Daozang, meaning "Taoist Canon", consists of around 1,400 texts that were collected to bring together all of the teachings of Taoism.
- Tao Te Ching
- Zhuangzi
- Liezi
- Qingjing Jing
- Taiping Jing
- Sanhuangjing
- Huangdi Yinfujing
- Xishengjing
- Huahujing
- Baopuzi
- List of Lingbao texts
- Xiang'er
- Zuowanglun
- Yunji Qiqian
- Wuzhen pian
- Holy Emperor Guan's True Scripture to Awaken the World
- Treatise On the Response of the Tao

=== Shinto ===
- The Kojiki
- The Rikkokushi, which includes the Nihon Shoki and the Shoku Nihongi
- The Fudoki
- The Kogo Shūi
- The Kujiki

=== Tenrikyo ===
- The Ofudesaki
- The Mikagura-uta
- The Osashizu

=== Muism ===
- Bon-puri, series of Korean shamanic narratives.
- Samgong bon-puri
- Menggam bon-puri
- Chogong bon-puri
- Munjeon bon-puri
- Gunung Bonpuri

== Iranian religions ==
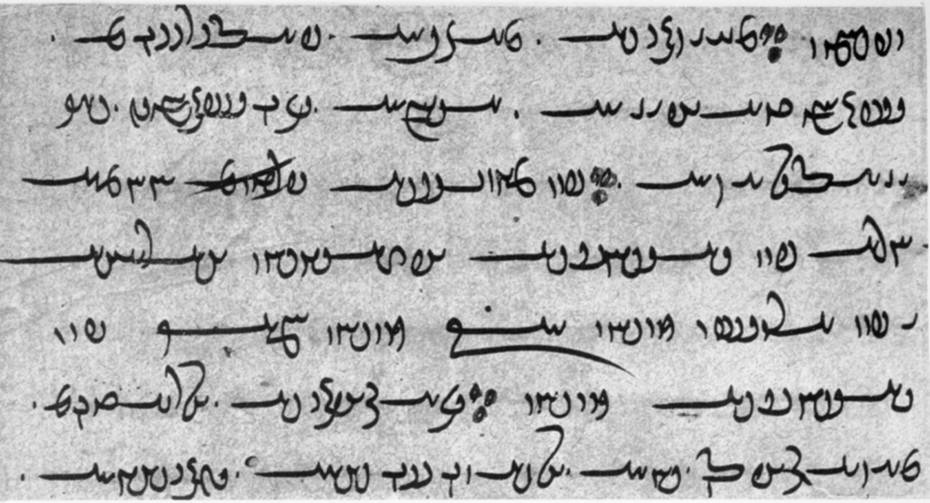
Yasna 28.1 (Bodleian MS J2)

=== Zoroastrianism ===
Primary religious texts (the Avesta collection):

- The Yasna, the primary liturgical collection, includes the Gathas.
- The Visperad, a collection of supplements to the Yasna.
- The Yashts, hymns in honor of the divinities.
- The Vendidad, describes the various forms of evil spirits and ways to confound them.
- shorter texts and prayers, the Yashts, the five Nyaishes ("worship, praise"), the Sirozeh and the Afringans (blessings).

There are some 60 secondary religious texts, none of which are considered scripture. The most important of these are:

- The Denkard (Middle Persian, 'Acts of Religion'),
- The Bundahishn, (Middle Persian, 'Primordial Creation')
- The Menog-i Khrad, (Middle Persian, 'Spirit of Wisdom')
- The Arda Viraf Namak (Middle Persian, 'The Book of Arda Viraf')
- The Sad-dar (modern Persian, 'Hundred Doors', or 'Hundred Chapters')
- The Rivayats, 15th–18th century correspondence on religious issues

For general use by the laity:

- The Zend (lit. 'commentaries'), various commentaries on and translations of the Avesta.
- The Khordeh Avesta, Zoroastrian prayer book for lay people from the Avesta.

=== Yarsanism ===
- Kalâm-e Saranjâm

=== Yazidi ===
- Qewls

== Indian religions ==
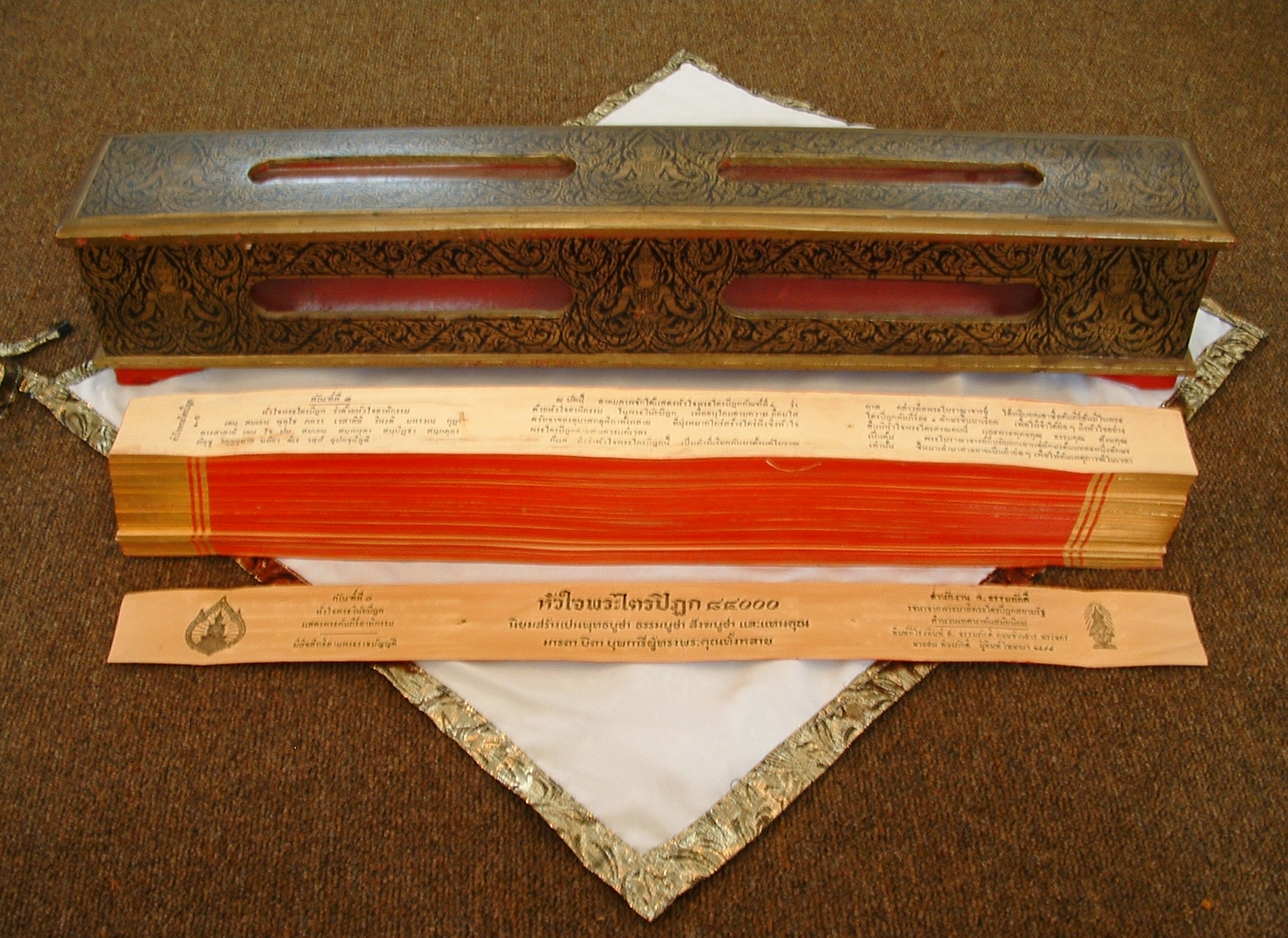
Ancient style of scripture used for the Pāli Canon

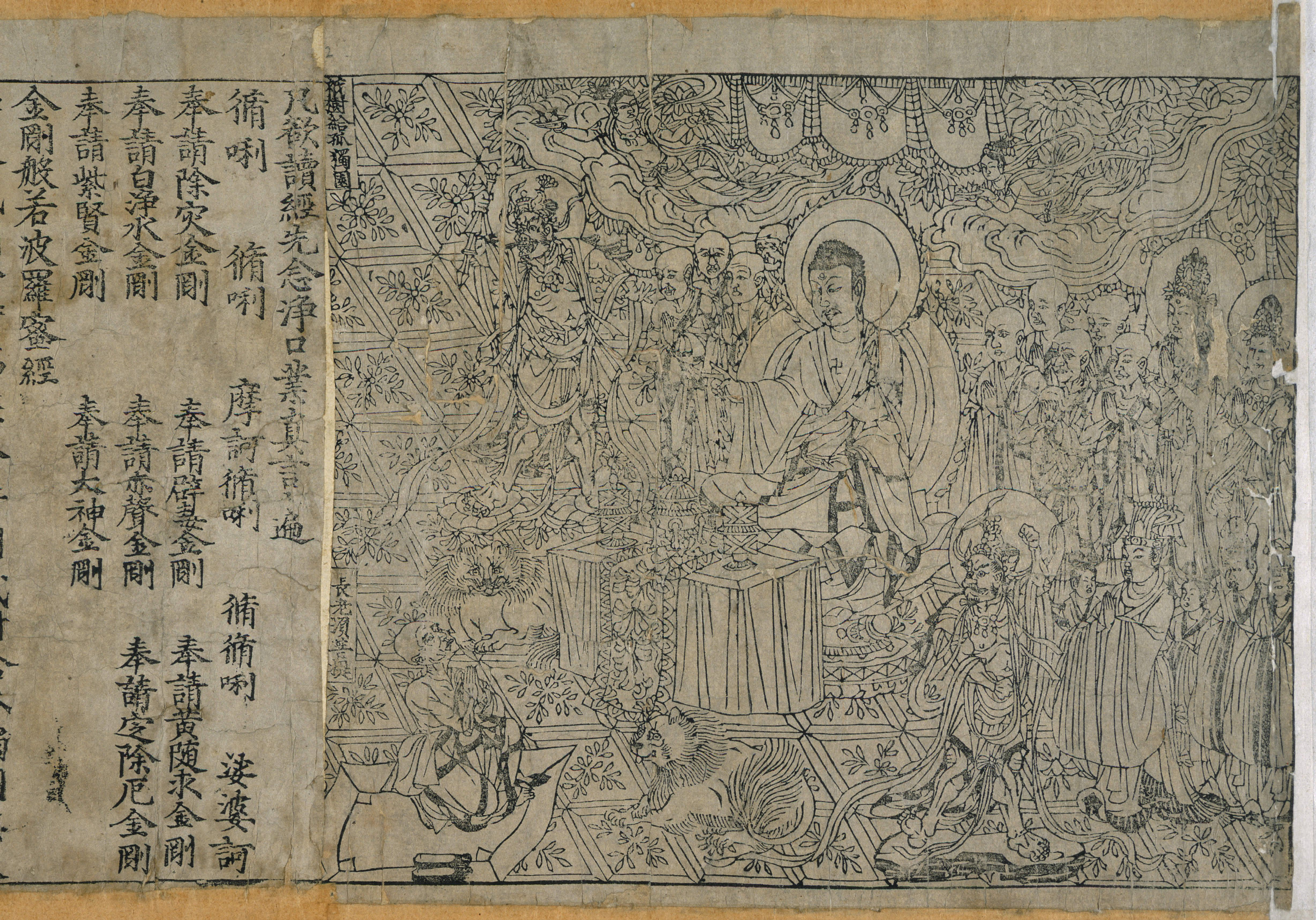
The Chinese Diamond Sutra, the oldest known dated printed book in the world, printed in the 9th year of Xiantong Era of the Tang dynasty, or 868 CE.

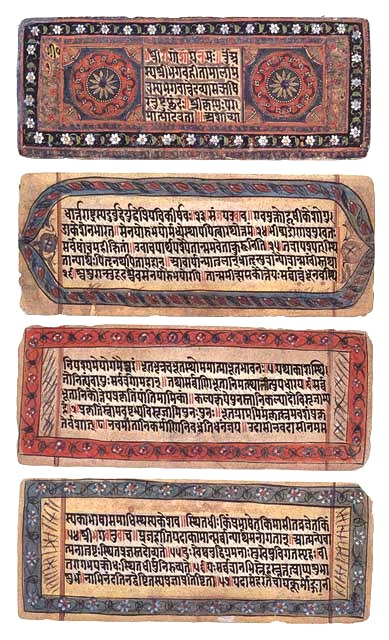
The Bhagavad Gita is Krishna's counsel to Arjuna on the battlefield of the Kurukshetra.

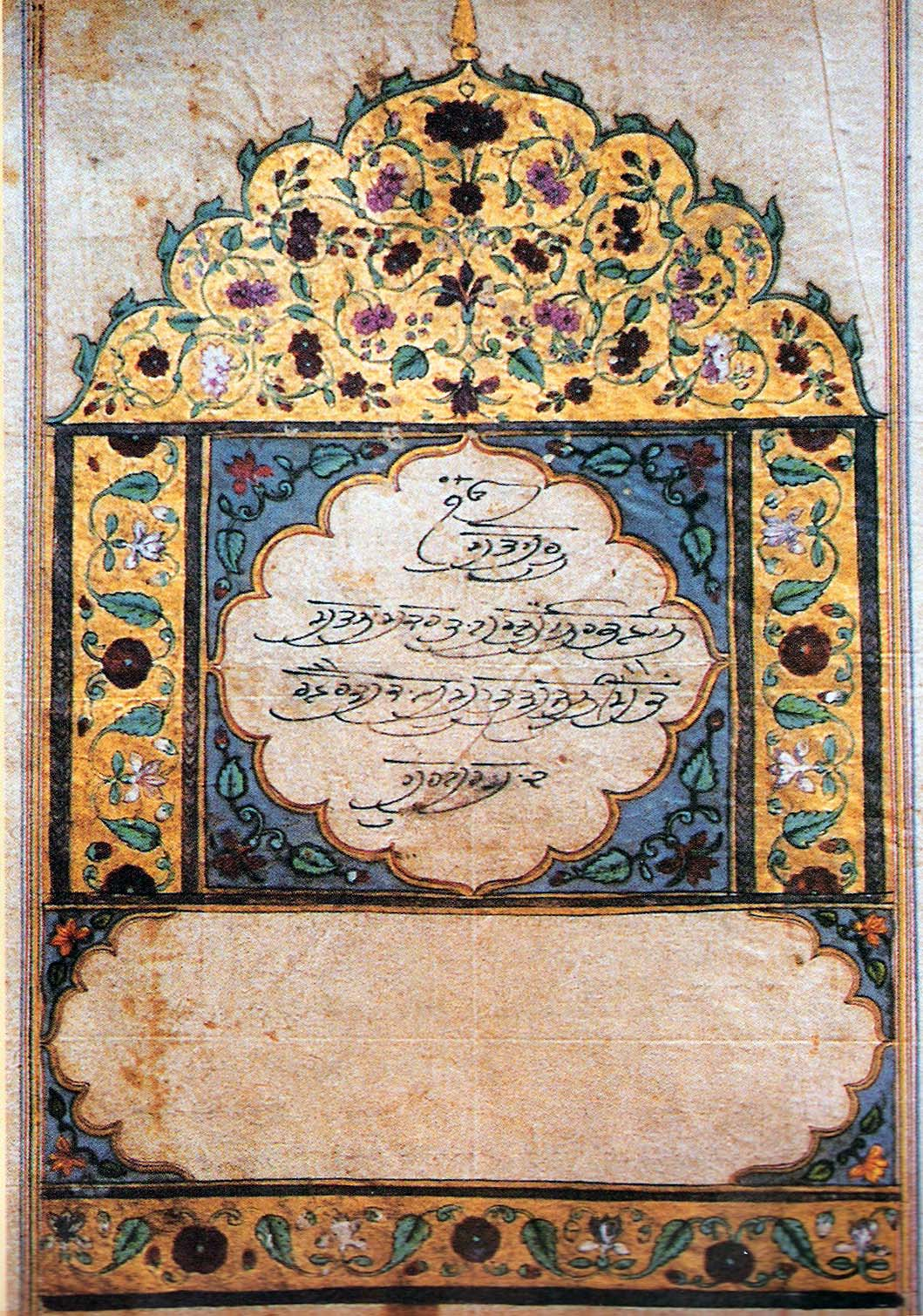
Illuminated Guru Granth folio with Mul Mantar (basic religion mantra) with signature of Guru Gobind Singh.

=== Buddhism ===
Theravada Buddhism:

- The Tipitaka or Pāli Canon
  - Vinaya Pitaka
    - Suttavibhaṅga: Pāṭimokkha and commentary
      - Mahāvibhaṅga: rules for monks
      - Bhikkhunīvibhaṅga: rules for nuns
    - Khandhaka: 22 chapters on various topics
    - Parivāra: analyses of rules from various points of view
  - Sutta Pitaka
    - Digha Nikaya, the "long" discourses (including Brahmajāla Sutta, Samaññaphala Sutta, Sigālovāda Sutta and Mahāparinibbāṇa Sutta)
    - Majjhima Nikaya, the "middle-length" discourses (including Ānāpānasati Sutta and Sammādiṭṭhi Sutta)
    - Samyutta Nikaya, the "connected" discourses (including Ādittapariyāya Sutta, Dhammacakkappavattana Sutta & Anattalakkhaṇa Sutta)
    - Anguttara Nikaya, the "numerical" discourses (including Dīghajāṇu Sutta)
    - Khuddaka Nikaya, the "minor collection" (including Dhammapada, Udāna, Itivuttaka, Sutta Nipāta, Theragatha and Therīgāthā)
  - Abhidhamma Pitaka
    - Dhammasaṅganī (-saṅgaṇi or -saṅgaṇī)
    - Vibhaṅga (vibhaṅga)
    - Dhātukathā (dhātukathā)
    - Puggalapaññatti (-paññatti)
    - Kathāvatthu (kathā-)
    - Yamaka
    - Paṭṭhāna (paţţhāna)

East Asian Mahayana:

- Aṣṭasāhasrikā Prajñāpāramitā Sūtra
- The Chinese Buddhist Mahayana sutras, including
  - Diamond Sutra and the Heart Sutra
  - Shurangama Sutra and its Shurangama Mantra
  - Great Compassion Mantra
  - Pure Land Buddhism
    - Infinite Life Sutra
    - Amitabha Sutra
    - Contemplation Sutra
    - other Pure Land Sutras
  - Tiantai, Tendai, and Nichiren
    - Lotus Sutra
  - Shingon
    - Mahavairocana Sutra
    - Vajrasekhara Sutra

Tibetan Buddhism:

- Tibetan Kangyur and Tengyur

=== Hinduism ===
Śruti:

- The Four Vedas
  - Rig Veda
  - Sama Veda
  - Yajur Veda
  - Atharva Veda
- Samhitas (Mantras, Prayers)
- Brahmanas (Commentaries, Instructions)
- Aranyakas (Meditation, Rituals)
- Upanishads (Essence, Wisdom)

Smriti:

- Itihāsas
  - Mahābhārata (including the Bhagavad Gita)
    - Bhagavad Gita
  - Ramayana
- Puranas (List)
  - Bhagavata Purana
- Tantras
- Sutras (List)
- Stotras
- Ashtavakra Gita
- Gherand Samhita
- Gita Govinda
- Hatha Yoga Pradipika
- Yoga Vasistha

In Purva Mimamsa:

- Purva Mimamsa Sutras

In Vedanta (Uttar Mimamsa):

- Brahma Sutras of Vyasa

In Yoga:

- Yoga Sutras of Patanjali

In Samkhya:

- Samkhya Sutras of Kapila

In Nyaya:

- Nyāya Sūtras of Gautama

In Vaisheshika:

- Vaisheshika Sutras of Kanada

In Vaishnavism:

- Vaikhanasa Samhitas
- Pancharatra Samhitas
- Divya Prabandha

In Shaktism:

- Shakta Tantras

In Kashmir Saivism:

- 64 Bhairavagamas
- 28 Shaiva Agamas
- Shiva Sutras of Vasugupta
- Vijnana Bhairava Tantra

In Pashupata Shaivism:

- Pashupata-sutra of Lakulisha
- Panchartha-bhashya of Kaundinya (a commentary on the Pashupata Sutras)
- Ganakarika
- Ratnatika of Bhasarvajna

In Shaiva Siddhanta:

- 28 Shaiva Agamas
- Tirumurai (canon of 12 works)
- Meykandar Shastras (canon of 14 works)

In Gaudiya Vaishnavism:

- Brahma Samhita
- Jayadeva's Gita Govinda

Krishna-karnamrita:

- Chaitanya Bhagavata
- Chaitanya Charitamrita
- Prema-bhakti-candrika
- Hari-bhakti-vilasa

In Lingayatism:

- Siddhanta Shikhamani
- Vachana sahitya
- Mantra Gopya
- Shoonya Sampadane
- 28 Agamas
- Karana Hasuge
- Basava purana

In Kabir Panth:

- poems of Kabir

In Dadu Panth:

- poems of Dadu

In Ayyavazhi:

Akilattirattu Ammanai:

- Akilam one
- Akilam two
- Akilam three
- Akilam four
- Akilam five
- Akilam six
- Akilam seven
- Akilam eight
- Akilam nine
- Akilam ten
- Akilam eleven
- Akilam twelve
- Akilam thirteen
- Akilam fourteen
- Akilam fifteen
- Akilam sixteen
- Akilam seventeen

Arul Nool:

- Ukappadippu
- Pothippu
- Ucchippadippu
- Saattu Neettolai
- Nadutheervai Ula
- Panchadevar Urppatthi
- Patthiram
- Sivakanta Athikarappatthiram
- Thingal patham
- Saptha Kannimar Padal
- Kalyana Vazhthu

=== Jainism ===
Śvetāmbara:

- 11 Angas
  - Secondary
    - 12 Upangas, 4 Mula-sutras, 6 Cheda-sutras, 2 Culika-sutras, 10 Prakirnakas

Digambara

- Samaysara
- Pravachanasara
- Niyamsara
- Pancastikayasara
- Karmaprabhrita, also called Satkhandagama
- Kashayaprabhrita

Nonsectarian/Nonspecific:

- Jina Vijaya
- Tattvartha Sutra
- GandhaHasti Mahabhashya (authoritative and oldest commentary on the Tattvartha Sutra)
- Four Anuyogas (the four vedas of Jainism)

=== Ravidassia ===
- Amritbani

=== Sikhism ===
- Guru Granth Sahib
- Dasam Granth
- Sarbloh Granth

=== Satpanth ===
- Ginans
- Dua (prayers)

== Abrahamic religions ==
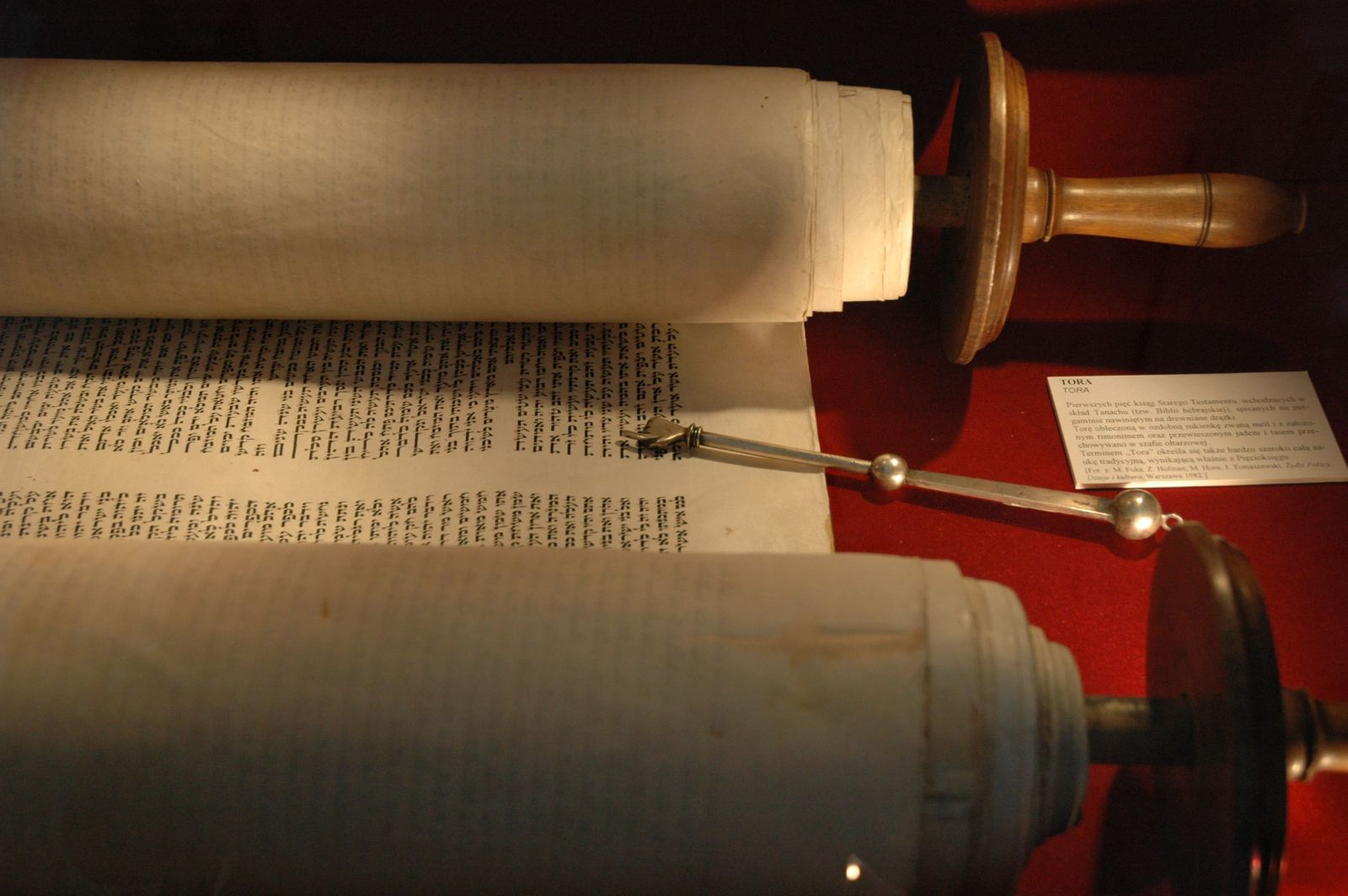
A Sefer Torah opened for liturgical use in a synagogue service

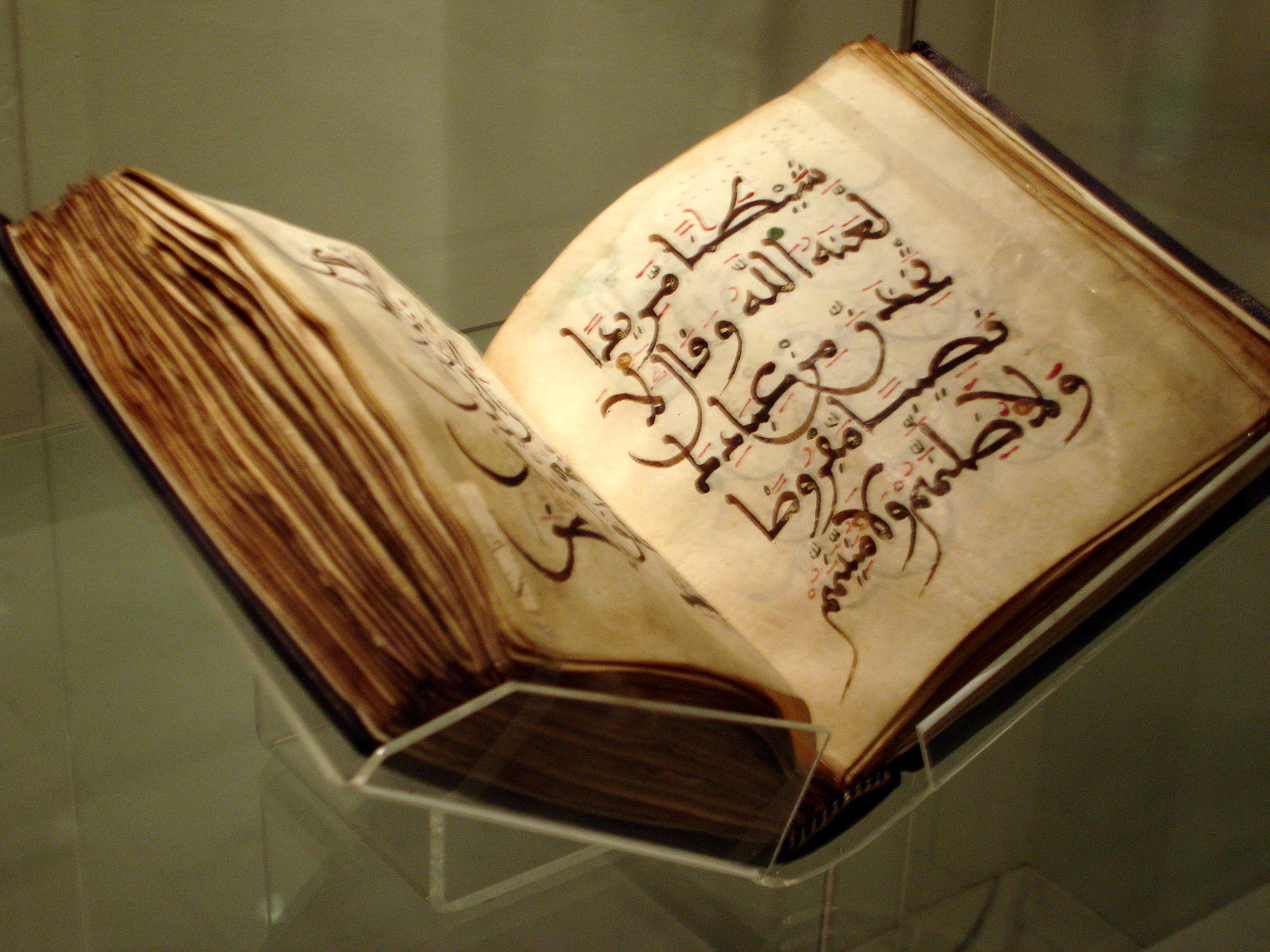
11th century North African Qur'an in the British Museum

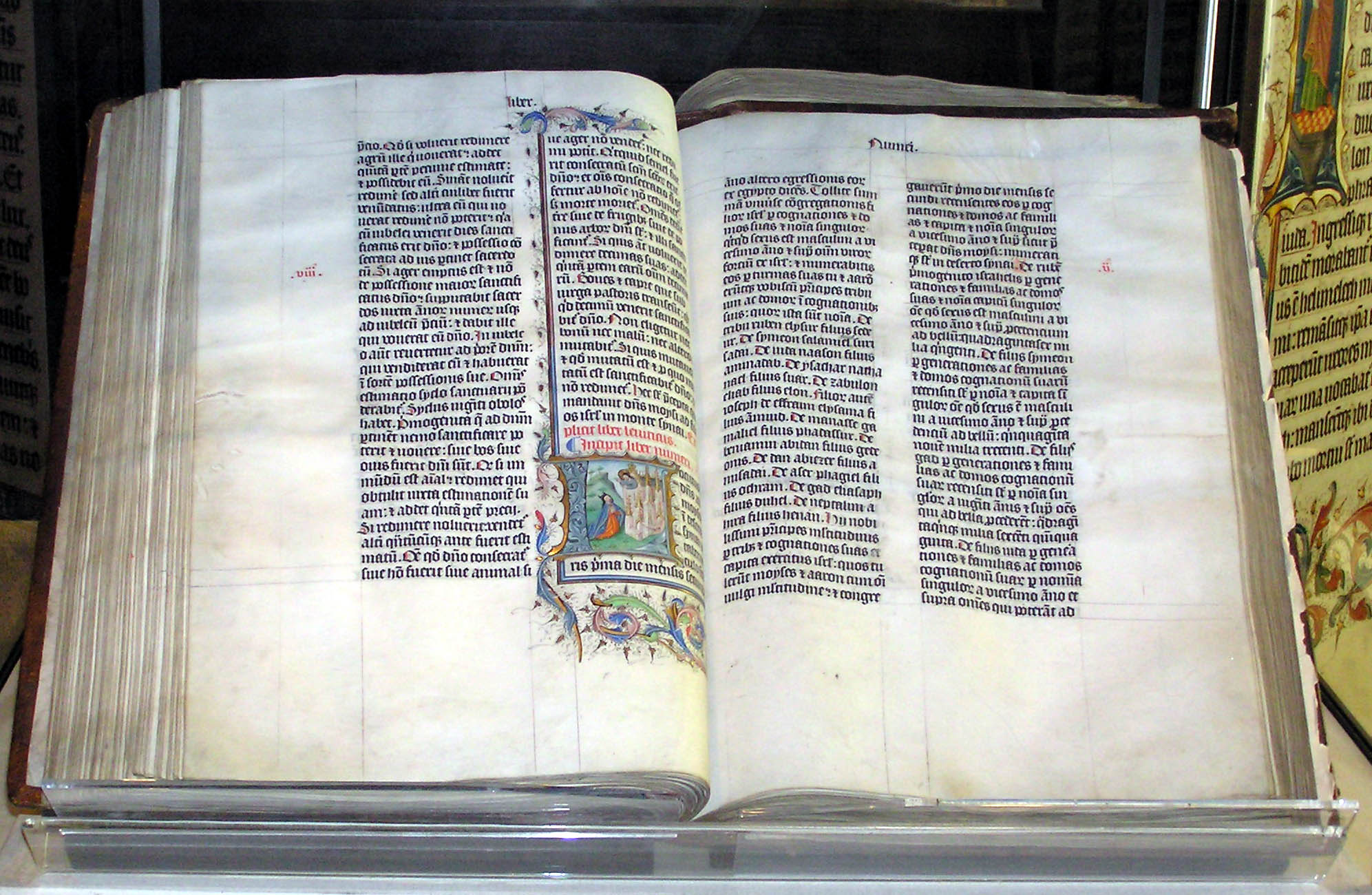
Christian Bible, 1407 handwritten copy

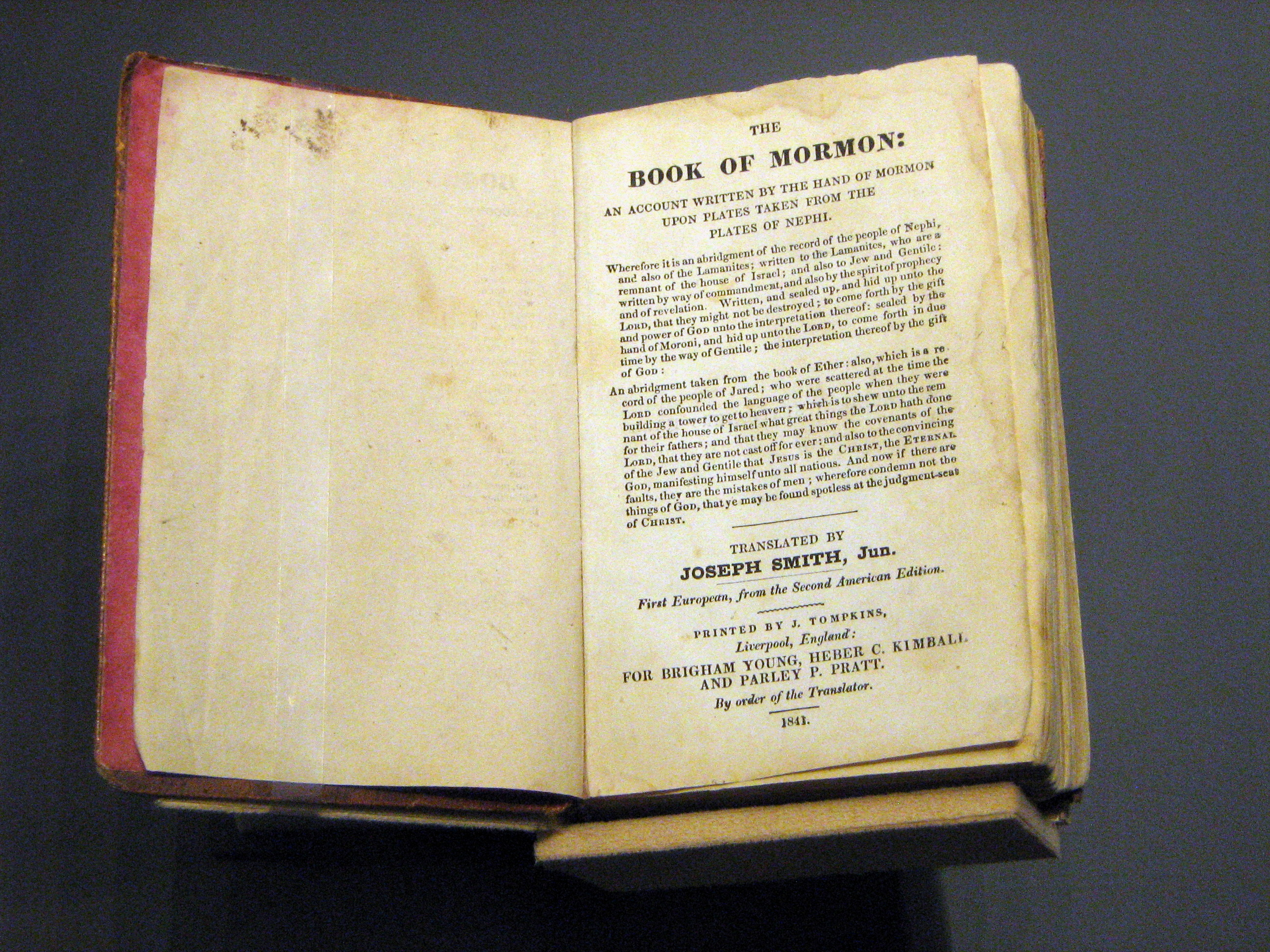
1841, first European (London) edition of the Book of Mormon, at the Springs Preserve museum, Las Vegas, Nevada.

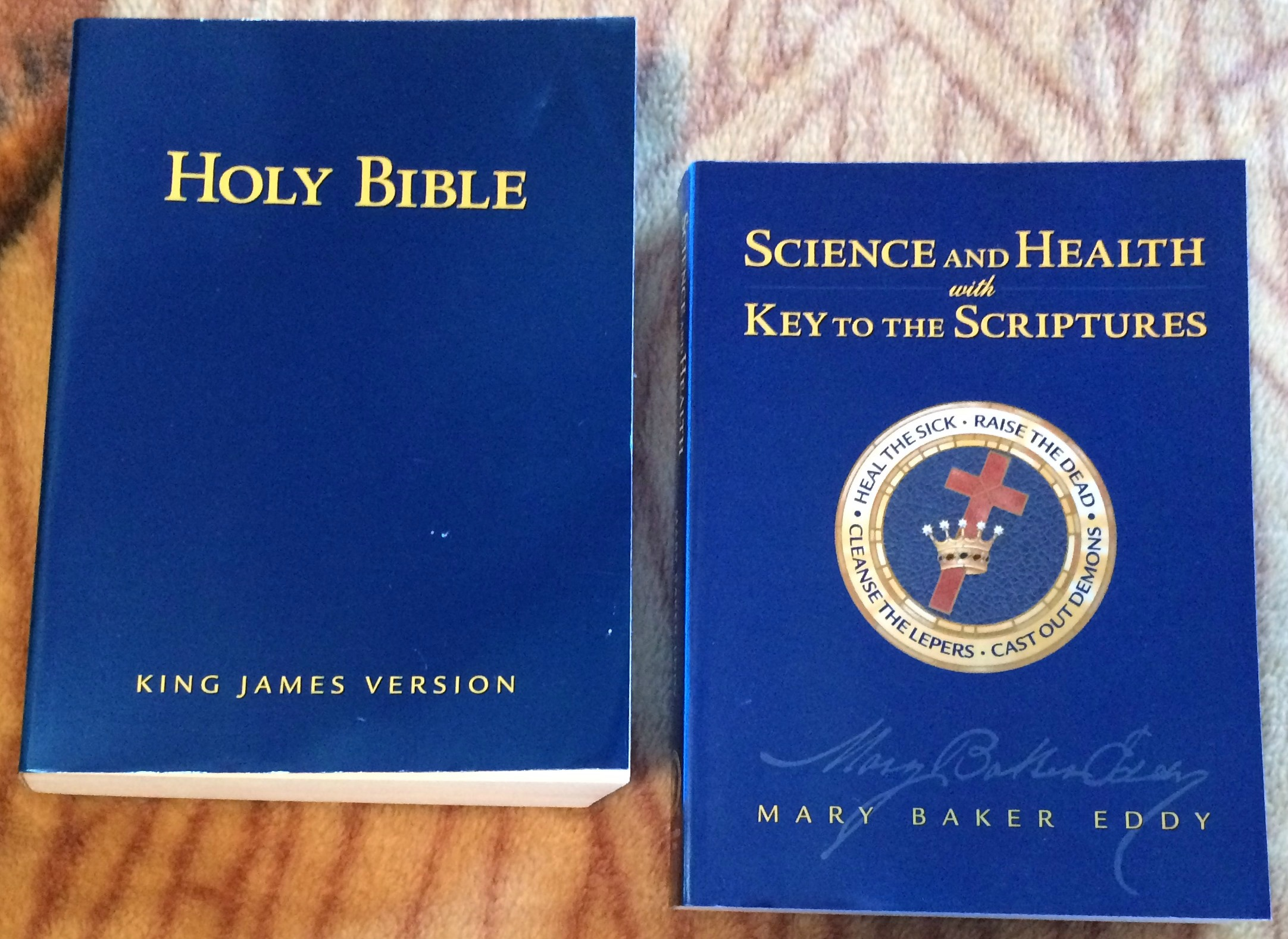
The Bible (left) and Science and Health with Key to the Scriptures (right) serve as the pastor of the Christian Science church.

=== Azalism (Religion of Bayan) ===
- Writings of the Báb
  - Persian Bayán 19,000 verses
  - Arabic Bayán 500 verses
  - Kitabul Asma'(also called The third Bayan and Haft Sha'n) the Largest Abrahimic Scripture composed of 25,000 pages of 60,000 revealed verses
  - Risalat al Raj'a 170 verses
  - Panj Sha'n 8360 verses
  - Dalail Sab'aa 1100 verses
  - Kitab al Haykal 160 verses
  - Qayum al Asma' 4700 verses
  - Tafsir al basmalah 157 verses
  - Tafsir al Qasida al Humyaryiah 1600 verses
  - Kitab al Ruh 7000 verses
  - Sahifah Qaimyiah
  - Sahifah Baynal Haramayn
  - Letters
  - Khutab
  - Ziyarat
  - Dua
  - Tafsir Surat al Kawthar
  - Tafsir Surat al Qadr
  - Tafsir Surat al Fatiha
  - Tafsir Surat al A'sr
  - Tafsir Surat al Baqara
  - Tafsir Surat al Tawhid
  - Nubwuah Khassah
  - Kitab al Fihrist
  - Another Kitab al Fihrist (Risalah Dahabyiah)
  - Lost Tafsir of Quran
- Writings of Subh al Azal
- Writings of the leaders after Subh al Azal
- Writings of letters of livings
  - Divan of Qurrat al Ayn
  - Other writings by the letters of living
- Hagiography
  - Nuqtat al Kaf
  - Majlis Shahadat Hazrat Qaim Khurasani (Bushru'i)

=== Bahá'í Faith ===
- Writings of the Báb
  - Persian Bayán
  - Arabic Bayán
  - Writings of the Báb
- Writings of Bahá'u'lláh,
  - Kitáb-i-Aqdas – The Most Holy Book
  - Kitáb-i-Íqán – The Book of Certitude
  - The Hidden Words
  - Days of Remembrance
  - Epistle to the Son of the Wolf
  - The Four Valleys
  - Gems of Divine Mysteries
  - Gleanings
  - Kitáb-i-Badí'
  - The Seven Valleys
  - Summons of the Lord of Hosts
  - Tabernacle of Unity
  - Tablets of Bahá'u'lláh
- Writings and Talks of 'Abdu'l‑Bahá
  - Some Answered Questions
  - Tablets of the Divine Plan
  - The Secret of Divine Civilization
  - Paris Talks
  - Will and Testament
- Writings of Shoghi Effendi
  - Advent of Divine Justice
  - Bahá'í Administration
  - God Passes By
  - World Order of Bahá'u'lláh
- Messages and writings of the Universal House of Justice
- The scripture of previous world religions

=== Christianity ===
==== Bible ====
The contents of Christian Bibles differ by denomination.

- The Canon of Trent defines a canonical list of books of the Catholic Bible that includes the whole 73-book canon recognized by the Catholic Church, including the deuterocanonical books. (In versions of the Latin Vulgate, 3 Esdras, 4 Esdras, and the Prayer of Manasseh are included in an appendix, but considered non-canonical, and are not included in modern Catholic Bibles).
- Most Protestant Bibles include the Hebrew Bible's 24 books (the protocanonical books) divided differently (into 39 books) and the 27-book New Testament for a total of 66 books. Some denominations (e.g. Anglicanism) also include the 14 books of the biblical apocrypha between the Old Testament and the New Testament, for a total of 80 books.
- Eastern Orthodox Bibles include the anagignoskomena, which consist of the Catholic deuterocanon, plus 3 Maccabees, Psalm 151, the Prayer of Manasseh, and 3 Esdras; The Fourth Book of Maccabees is considered to be canonical by the Georgian Orthodox Church. (Note: Eastern Orthodox also generally divide Baruch and Letter of Jeremiah into two books instead of one. The enumeration of the Books of Ezra is different in many Orthodox Bibles, as it is in all others: see the naming conventions of the Books of Esdras.) The Septuagint, the Greek translation of the Old Testament, is authoritative.
- The God Worshipping Society used an alternate version of the Bible based on Robert Morrison's Chinese Translations of the Bible. Edits include cutting out Lot's daughters Incest with their Father, and changing the Woman of the Apocalypse from Book of Revelation to be the Mother goddess.
- The Church of the East includes most of the deuterocanonical books of the Old Testament which are found in the Peshitta (The Syriac Version of the Bible). The New Testament in modern versions contains the 5 disputed books (2 Peter, 2 John, 3 John, Jude, and Revelation) that were originally excluded.
- In Oriental Orthodoxy, the biblical canon differs in each Patriarchate.
  - The Armenian Apostolic Orthodox Church has at various times included a variety of books in the New Testament which are not included in the canons of other traditions.
  - The Ethiopian Orthodox Tewahedo Church (and its daughter, the Eritrean Orthodox Church) accept various books according to either of the Narrower or the Broader Canons but always include the entire Catholic deuterocanon, the Prayer of Manasseh, 3 Ezra, 4 Ezra, and The Book of Josippon. They may also include the Book of Jubilees, Book of Enoch, 1 Baruch, 4 Baruch, as well as 1, 2, and 3 Meqabyan (no relation to the Books of Maccabees). The New Testament contains the Sinodos, the Books of the Covenant, Clement, and the Didascalia.
- Some Syrian Churches, regardless of whether they are Eastern Catholic, Nestorian, Oriental or Eastern Orthodox, accept the Letter of Baruch as scripture.
- Some early Quakers also included the Epistle to the Laodiceans.

==== Additional and alternative scriptures ====
Some Christian denominations have additional or alternate holy scriptures, some with authoritativeness similar to the Old Testament and New Testament.

- The Unification Church includes the Divine Principle in its holy scriptures.
- Gnostic Christianity rejected the narrative in Pauline Christianity that the arrival of Jesus had to do with the forgiveness of sins, and instead were concerned with illusion and enlightenment. Gnostic texts include Gnostic gospels about the life of Jesus, books attributed to various apostles, apocalyptic writings, and philosophical works. Though there is some overlap with some New Testament works, the rest were eventually considered heretical by Christian orthodoxy. Gnostics generally did not include the Old Testament as canon. They believed in two gods, one of which was Yahweh (generally considered evil), the author of the Hebrew Bible and god of the Jews, separate from a Supreme God who sent Jesus.
  - Marcion's canon included only the Gospel of Marcion and a set of Pauline epistles which overlap with the canon of orthodox Pauline Christianity. His gospel was a version of the Gospel of Luke that did not contain any references to the Old Testament.
  - The Cainites apparently used the Gospel of Judas.

===== Latter Day Saint movement =====
- The Protestant Bible
- The Church of Jesus Christ of Latter-day Saints (LDS Church) uses the LDS edition of the King James Bible for English-speaking members; other versions are used in non-English speaking countries. The Community of Christ (RLDS) uses the Joseph Smith Translation, which it calls the Inspired Version, as well as updated modern translations, mainly the NRSV.
- The Book of Mormon
- The Doctrine and Covenants. There are significant differences in content and section numbering between the Doctrine and Covenants used by the Community of Christ (RLDS) and the LDS Church.
- The Pearl of Great Price is authoritative in the LDS Church, rejected by Community of Christ.
- Other, smaller branches of Latter Day Saints include other scriptures such as:
  - Lectures on Faith recognized in canon of Fundamentalists and some Prairie Saints.
  - The Book of the Law of the Lord used by the Church of Jesus Christ of Latter Day Saints (Strangite). This sect likewise holds as scriptural several prophecies, visions, revelations, and translations printed by James Strang, and published in the Revelations of James J. Strang.
  - The Word of the Lord and The Word of the Lord Brought to Mankind by an Angel used by Fettingite branches.

==== Liturgical books ====
Liturgical books are used to guide or script worship, and many are specific to a denomination.

Catholic liturgical books:

- Books of the clergy
  - The Roman Missal (The pope, archbishops, bishops, priests and deacons editions)
  - The Book of the Gospels (evangeliary/evangelion)
  - The Lectionary
  - Sacramentary (for bishops and priests)
  - Pontifical (for bishops)
  - Cæremoniale Episcoporum (for bishops)
  - Breviary (Hours/Divine Office)
  - Gradual (Roman gradual, antiphonal, cantatory)
  - Liber Usualis (Book of Common Use/Gregorian chants)
  - Roman Ritual (baptism, benedictions, blessings, burials, exorcisms, etc.)
  - Roman Martyrology (saints/The blessed)
- Books of church attendants:
  - Missal (pew cyclical editions)
  - Missalette (pew seasonal editions)
  - Hymnal (pew hymnbook editions)

Protestant liturgical books:

- Anglicanism:
  - Book of Common Prayer (BCP) 1549
- Lutheranism:
  - Evangelical Lutheran Hymn-Book (ELHB) 1912
  - The Lutheran Hymnal (TLH) 1941
  - Lutheran Book of Prayer (LBP) 1941
  - Lutheran Service Book and Hymnal (SBH) 1958
  - Lutheran Book of Worship (LBW) 1978
  - Lutheran Worship (LW) 1982
  - Evangelical Lutheran Worship (ELW) 2006
  - Lutheran Service Book (LSB) 2006
  - Numerous hymn, service and guide books (varies by church)
- Methodism:
  - The Sunday Service of the Methodists
  - Book of Worship for Church and Home (1965)
  - The Book of Hymns
  - The United Methodist Hymnal (United Methodist Church)
  - The United Methodist Book of Worship (1992) (United Methodist Church)
  - Book of Discipline (United Methodist) (John Wesley-1784, United Methodist Church-2016)
  - Numerous hymn, service and guide books (varies by church)
- Southern Baptists:
  - Baptist Hymnal
  - Numerous hymn, service and guide books (varies by church)

==== Doctrines and laws ====
Various Christian denominations have texts which define the doctrines of the group or set out laws which are considered binding. The groups consider these to range in permanence from unquestionable interpretations of divine revelations to human decisions made for convenience or elucidation which are subject to reconsideration.

- Doctrines such as the Trinity, the virgin birth and atonement
- The Ten Commandments (Biblical Hebrew: עֲשֶׂרֶת הַדִּבְּרוֹת, romanized: Aseret ha'Dibrot), also known in Christianity as the Decalogue, are a set of biblical principles relating to ethics and worship.
- The distinctive Calvinist doctrine of "double" predestination.
- In Catholicism, the concept of Magisterium reserves matters of religious interpretation to the church, with various levels of infallibility expressed in various documents.
  - Infallibility of the Church is applied to:
    - In the Catholic Church, papal infallibility of a very small number of papal decrees. Most documents produced by the Pope, including the Catechism of the Catholic Church are considered subject to revision.
  - To the decisions of ecumenical councils in Catholic, some Orthodox, and some Protestant denominations, though the non-Catholic denominations only accept certain councils as genuinely ecumenical.
  - The Salvation Army Handbook of Doctrine
  - Transubstantiation and Marian teachings in Roman Catholic theology. The department of the Roman Curia that deals with questions of doctrine is called the Dicastery for the Doctrine of the Faith.
- The Christian Science textbook Science and Health with Key to the Scriptures by Mary Baker Eddy, along with the Bible, serves as the permanent "impersonal pastor" of the Church of Christ, Scientist.
- The Methodist Church of Great Britain refers to the "doctrines to which the preachers of the Methodist Church are pledged" as doctrinal standards.
- Seventh-day Adventists hold the writings of Ellen White are held to an elevated status, though not equal with the Bible, as she is considered to have been an inspired prophetess.
- Swedenborgianism is defined by the Biblical interpretations of Emanuel Swedenborg starting with Arcana Cœlestia.
- H. Emilie Cady's 1896 Lessons in Truth, A Course of Twelve Lessons in Practical Christianity is considered a core text of the Unity Church.
- Jehovah's Witnesses Jehovah's Witnesses publications
- The God Worshipping Society used numerous other books written by Hong Xiuquan in worship:
  - Original Salvation Song
  - The Original Awakening
  - Original Thought Course
  - The Divine Poems
  - The Edict of Peace
  - The Poems for Slaying Evil and Preserving Righteousness

=== Druze ===
- Rasa'il al-hikmah (Epistles of Wisdom)

=== Islam ===
The five universally acknowledged messengers (rasul) in Islam are Abraham, Moses, Noah, Jesus and Muhammad, each believed to have been sent with a scripture. Muslims believe David (Dāwūd) received Psalms (Zabur) (cf. Q38:28); Jesus (Īsā) the Gospel (Injil); Muhammad received the Qur'an; Abraham (Ibrahim) the Scrolls of Abraham; and Moses (Mūsā) the Torah (Tawrat).

==== Sunni Islam ====
- Quran
- Hadith books (Kutub al-Sittah):
  - Sahih Al-Bukhari
  - Sahih Muslim
  - Sahih al-Tirmidhi
  - Sunan Abu Dawood
  - Al-Sunan al-Sughra (Sunan an-Nasa'i)
  - Sunan ibn Majah
- Other Hadith books:
  - Muwatta Imam Malik
  - Musnad Ahmad ibn Hanbal
  - Sunan al-Kubra
  - The Meadows of the Righteous (Riyadh al-saliheen)
  - Bulugh al-Maram
  - Musannaf of Abd al-Razzaq
  - Sunan al-Daraqutni
  - Sahih Ibn Hibban
  - Sunan al-Darimi
  - Musnad al-Shafi'i
  - Musnad Abu Hanifa
  - Sahih ibn Khuzaima
  - Musnad Tayalisi
  - Musnad al-Bazzar
  - Musnad Abi Ya'la
  - Musnad Rahwayh
  - Musnad ibn Humayd
  - Musnad al-Firdous
  - Tahdhib al-Athar
  - Al-Mu'jam al-Awsat
  - Al-Mu'jam as-Saghir
  - Majma al-Zawa'id
  - Kanz al-Ummal
  - Shuab ul Iman
  - Sharh Ma'anir Athar
  - Sharh Mushkīlil Athar
  - Silsilah Sahiha
  - Mishkat al-Masabih
  - Al-Adab al-Mufrad
  - Sahih Hadith Kudsi
  - Shama'il Muhammadiyah
  - At-Targhib wat-Tarhib

==== Twelver Islam ====
- Quran
- Nahj al Balagha
- Al Sahiyfa al Sajadiyya
- Al Jafr which is a book composed of letters of 784 tables (28 sections of letters × 28 chapters of letters) about Omniscience and it has its own grammars to answer many of questions about prophecy or fiqh or medecine or anything according to Jaffars and every table is composed of 28 × 28 for letters of line and of Khana (house) each Khana of 4 letters, however some Usuli scholars rejects it and it is only used by Irfani, Shaykhis and few of Akhbaris and Usulis.
- Hadith
  - The Four Books
    - Kitab al-Kafi 8 Volumes
    - Man La Yahduruhu al-Faqih 4 volumes
    - Tahdhib al-Ahkam 5 volumes
    - Al-Istibsar 4 volumes
  - Jawami' al Hadith
    - Bihar al-Anwar 25 large Volumes = 100 volumes, it is a general encyclopedia more than of Hadith
    - Awalim al-Ulum it is said that it was 400 volumes = 100 large volumes and it is an extended version of Bihar which once collected all of Hadith of Sunna and Shia and all of the sayings of historians, astrologers, doctors, philosophers and Clerics of Shia and Sunna of that time as explanation of Hadith but it was lost.
    - Wasa'il al Shia 24 volumes
    - Kitab al Wafi 12 volumes
    - Kitab Mustadrak al Wasa'il 12 volumes
    - Safinat al Bihar
    - Tafsir al-Burhan 10 volumes
    - Jami' Ahadith al Shia 20 volumes
    - Min Fiqh Ahlil Bayt by Syed Muhammad al Shirazi 40 volumes
  - Mawsu'at (Encyclopedias)
    - Masānīd Ahlil Bayt by Azizullah al Utaridi 70 volumes contains all of Shia Hadith
    - Mu'jam al Ahadith al Mu'tabara by Asif Muhsini 8 volumes
  - Prayer books
    - Mafateh al Jinan
    - Kamel al Ziyarat
    - Kutub al Masabih
    - Thamarat al Awād
    - Kutub al Ziyarat wal Udyiat wal Salawat
  - Hagiografies
    - Kitab Manaqib Āl Abi Talib
    - Kutub al Maqatil
    - Kutub waqa'at Siffin, Nahrawan and Jamal
    - Kutub al Gharat
    - Kitab al Khara'ij wal Jara'ih
    - Kitab Mashariq Anwar al Waqin
    - Kitab al Hidayiah al Kubra
    - Kitab Uyūn Akhbar al Rida
  - Kutub al Ghayba
    - Of Al Nu'mani
    - Of Al Saduq
    - Of Fadl ibn Shadhan
    - Of al Tūsi
    - Of Ibn Tawus
  - Kutub al Raja'a
  - Usul Arba'mi'a only few of it survived
    - Qurb al Isnad
    - Tafsir al Imam al Askari
    - Al Usul al Sitat Ashar
    - Kitab Sulaym ibn Qays
    - Asl Isa
    - Al Jafaryiat
    - Kitab al Mahasin of Ibn Khalid al Barqi Called as the Fifth Book
    - Nawadir of Sa'd al Asha'ri
    - Al Risalah al Dahabyiah
    - Sahifat al Rida
    - Mukhtasar Basa'ir al Darajat
    - Basa'ir al Darajat
    - And Others

==== Alawites ====
- Quran (for Zahiris it is the main Scripture but for Batinis it is a very minor Scripture)
- Kitab al Hidayah al Kubra (for Zahiri Alawites)
- Kitab al Majmu (for Batini Alawites).
- Batini Scriptures (Only for Makhusi Sheikhs it is forbidden for Murid or women or non Alawites to read or hear it)
  - Kitab al Sirat
  - Kitab al Haft
  - Kitab al Maratib wal Duraj
  - Kitab al Ruq'a (Talisman)
  - Kitab al Ta'a Fi Ma'rifat al Sa'a
  - Kitab Adab Abi Talib
  - Kitab al Alāma fi Ma'rifat Yawm al Qiyama
  - Kitab al Lahut
  - Kitab Mubtada' al Nur wal Zulmah
  - Kitab al Abwab
  - Kitab al Mahmud wal Mazmum
  - Kitab Nur al Qulub
  - Kitab al Wasāyah fi Ma'rifat al Khafāya
    - Red Jafr (Book of Prophecy and part of al Wasayah)
  - White Jafr (Magical letters talismanic book)
  - al Suluk fi Ma'rifat Awakhir al Muluk
  - al Risalah al Ristpashiyah
  - Fiqh al Risalah al Ristpashiyah
  - Kitab al Akwar wal Adwar (of Major and Minor Cycles of time and reincarnation)
  - Kitab al Surah wal Mithal
  - Kitab al Jawharah al Taliqaniyyah
- Kulazi Batini Scriptures (only for The Kulazi Shiekhs and it is forbidden for Murids or women or non-Alawite to read or hear it)
  - Fiqh al Dastur (exegesis of Majm'u)
  - al Risalah al Ristpashiyah
  - Fiqh al Risalah al Ristpashiyah (Exegesis of it)
  - Kitab al Asus
  - Kitab al Yunan
  - Kitab al Akwar wal Adwar
  - Kitab al Surah wal Mithal
  - Talisman of Ruqa'a
  - Rasa'il al Shaykh Ibn Yunus al Kualzi

==== Ahmadiyya ====
- Quran
- Hadith (Sunni corpus)
- Rūhānī Khazā᾽in, collected writings of Mirza Ghulam Ahmad (23 volumes)
- Malfūzāt, the Discourses of Ghulam Ahmad (10 volumes)
- Tafsīr-e-Kabīr, 10-volume Quranic commentary by Mirza Bashir al-Din Mahmud Ahmad

==== Alevism (Qizilbash) ====
The most revered Alevi scriptures are:

- Quran
- Khutbat al Bayan
- Nuqtat al Bayan
- Buyruks
  - Menakib Imam Ja'far Sadiq
  - Menakib Sheyh Safi
  - Other Buyruks
- Makalat
- Maktel Husein
- Hazrat Ali Cenkliri (Military Career Biography of Imam Ali)
- Haci Bektash Kumru (about Karbala')
- Kenzul Mesayieb
- Huseynie
- Vilayet Nameh
- Musebyyi Nameh
- Fazilat Nameh
- Akhirat Nameh
- Javedan Nameh
- Saqi Nameh
- Battal Nameh
- Abu Moslem Nameh
- Sal Nameh (Of Sadridden)
- Divans of 7 Saints
  - Divan Hatai
  - Divan Sultan Abdal
  - Other 5 Divans
- Kitab Cabbrkulu
- Mira'tul Maqasid

==== Mevlevi Order ====
- Quran
- Masnavi
- Fihi Ma Fihi
- Diwan-e Shams-e Tabrizi

=== Ismailism ===
In Ismailism Quran is divided into Tanzil (Original Quran) which is the law of 6th Natiq Prophet Muhammad and Ta'wil (Exegesis) which is the law of the 7th Natiq and al Qaim Imam Muhammad ibn Ismail and his children and grand children (the Imams after him) this is One Scripture (Quran) :

- Quran
  - Tanzil al Quran
  - Ta'wil al Quran
    - Ginans (For Indian Nizaris)
      - Dasa Avatara Granth
      - Nihkalanki Gita
      - Many Other Granths Composed of more than 25,000 verses
      - More than 600 Short Ginans
    - Dua
    - Daim al Islam
    - Ta'wil al Da'im
    - Rasa'il Ikhwan al Safa
    - Umm al-Kitab (Shi'i book)
    - Kanz al walad (For Taybism)
    - al Fatrat wal Qiranat (For Taybism)
    - Kirmani writings
    - Nasir Khosrow Writings
    - Sayings and deeds of each Imam
    - Books of Dua't
      - Nurun ala Nur
      - Other Books

=== Judaism ===
==== Rabbinic Judaism ====
- The Tanakh i.e. Hebrew Bible
  - Torah (teachings)
  - Nevi'im (prophets)
  - Ketuvim (writings)
- The Talmud
  - Mishnah
  - Tosefta
  - Gemara
- The Midrash

===== Haymanot =====
- The Tanakh with several Jewish apocrypha

===== Kabbalism =====
- Kabbalah: Primary texts
- Zohar
- Chassidut

==== Non-rabbinic Judaism ====
===== Karaite Judaism =====
- The Tanakh

===== Jewish Science =====
- The Tanakh
- Jewish Science: Divine Healing in Judaism

=== Rastafari movement ===
- The Bible (Ethiopian Orthodox canon)
- the Holy Piby
- the Kebra Nagast
- The speeches and writings of Haile Selassie I (including his autobiography My Life and Ethiopia's Progress)
- Royal Parchment Scroll of Black Supremacy

=== Samaritanism ===
- Samaritan Torah
- There are numerous other Samaritan Scriptures and writings including: Samaritan Book of Joshua and the Tolidah

=== Shabakism ===
- Buyruk (Shabak)

== Pre-Columbian Americas ==
=== Aztec religion ===
- The Borgia Group codices

=== Maya religion ===
- The Popol Vuh
- the Dresden Codex
- the Madrid Codex
- the Paris Codex

== Ethnic religions ==
=== Bon (autochthonous religious tradition of Tibet) ===
- Bön Kangyur and Tengyur

=== Guarani religion ===
- Ayvu Rapyta

=== Kaharingan ===
- Panaturan

=== Kiratism ===
- The Mundhum of the Limbu ethnic group

=== Old Norse religion ===
- Poetic Edda
- Prose Edda

=== Sanamahism ===
Main texts:

- Sanamahi Laihui
- Khongjomnubi Nonggarol
- Wakoklon Heelel Thilel Salai Amailon Pukok
- Leithak Leikharol

Other texts:

- Phouoibi Waron
- Poireiton Khunthok
- Numit Kappa
- Nungpan Ponpi Luwaopa
- Panthoibi Khonggul

=== Sari Dharam ===
- Sari Dharam Sereng Puthi
- Sari Dharam Sarila
- Jomsim Binti

=== Sunda Wiwitan ===
- Sanghyang Siksa Kandang Karesian

=== Yorùbá religion ===
- Odù Ifá

== New religious movements ==
=== The ACIM Movement ===
- A Course in Miracles

=== Ahmadi Religion of Peace and Light ===
- Goal of the Wise by Abdullah Hashim
- Sayings of Imam Ahmed al Hassan
- Kitab al Tawhid by Ahmed al Hassan
- Kitab al Ijl (Calf) by Ahmed al Hassan
- Kitab al Haft by Imam Jaf'ar al Sadiq (which is considered the most important Scripture after the above).
- Various scriptures of different religions and philosophies, especially gnostic and Kabbalah.

=== The writings of Franklin Albert Jones a.k.a. Adi Da Love-Ananda Samraj ===
- Aletheon
- The Companions of the True Dawn Horse
- The Dawn Horse Testament
- Gnosticon
- The Heart of the Adi Dam Revelation
- Not-Two IS Peace
- Pneumaton
- Transcendental Realism

=== Aetherius Society ===
- The Nine Freedoms

=== Caodaism ===
- Kinh Thiên Đạo Và Thế Đạo (Prayers of the Heavenly and the Earthly Way)
- Pháp Chánh Truyền (The Religious Constitution of Caodaism)
- Tân Luật (The Canonical Codes)
- Thánh Ngôn Hiệp Tuyển (Compilation of Divine Messages)

=== Cheondoism ===
- The Donghak Scripture
- The Songs of Yongdam
- The Sermons of Master Haeweol
- The Sermons of Revered Teacher Euiam

=== Creativity Movement ===
The writings of Ben Klassen:

- Nature's Eternal Religion
- The White Man's Bible
- Salubrious Living

=== Discordianism ===
- The Principia Discordia

=== Druidry ===
- The Mabinogion
- Lebor Gabála Érenn
- Barddas

=== Dudeism ===
- The Dude De Ching
- Duderonomy

=== Eckankar ===
- Writings of Paul Twitchell

=== Heathenry ===
- Edda

=== Konkokyo ===
- Konkokyo Kyoten
  - Oshirase-Goto Obobe-Chō
  - Konko Daijin Oboegaki
  - Gorikai I
  - Gorikai II
  - Gorikai III

=== Meher Baba ===
- God Speaks
- Discourses

=== Meivazhi ===
- The four vedas of Meivazhi
  - Āti mey utaya pūrana veētāntam
  - Āntavarkal mānmiyam
  - Eman pātar atipatu tiru meyññanak koral
  - Eman pātar atipatu kotāyūtak kūr

=== Mujibism ===
- The Unfinished Memoirs

=== Nuwaubian Movement ===
- The Holy Tablets

=== Oahspe Faithism ===
- Oahspe: A New Bible

=== Oomoto ===
- Oomoto Shin'yu
- Reikai Monogatari

=== Pastafarianism ===
- The Gospel of the Flying Spaghetti Monster

=== Raëlism ===
The writings of Raël a.k.a. Claude Vorilhon:

- Intelligent Design: Message from the Designers
- Sensual Meditation
- Yes to Human Cloning

=== Religious Science ===
- The Science of Mind by Ernest Holmes

=== Satanism ===
- The Satanic Bible
- The Satanic Rituals
- The Satanic Scriptures

=== Scientology ===
- Bibliography of Scientology

=== Seicho-no-Ie ===
- Nectarean Shower of Holy Doctrines (甘露の法雨, Kanro no Hōu)
- Truth of Life (生命の實相, Seimei no jissō)

=== Spiritism ===
- The Spirits Book
- The Book on Mediums
- The Gospel According to Spiritism
- Heaven and Hell
- The Genesis According to Spiritism
- The Bible

=== Subud ===
- Susila Budhi Dharma

=== SubGenius ===
- The Book of the SubGenius

=== Thelema ===
- The Holy Books of Thelema, especially The Book of the Law

=== Unarius Academy of Science ===
- The Pulse of Creation Series
- The Infinite Concept of Cosmic Creation

=== Urantianism ===
- The Urantia Book

=== Wicca ===
- Witchcraft Today
- The Spiral Dance
- Trojan's Essential Guide to Wicca
- Book of Shadows
- Charge of the Goddess
- Threefold Law
- Wiccan Rede

== See also ==
- List of religions and spiritual traditions
