= Gunungsin =

Deities of war in Korean religion

- Hangul: 군웅신
- Hanja: 軍雄神
- RR: Gunungsin
- MR: Kunungsin

The Gunungsin (Korean: 군웅신; Hanja: 群雄神; 軍雄神) are deities of war in Korean religion. Their origin is shown in the Gunung Bonpuri and are not to be confused with the Janggunsin — historical generals (such as Ch'oe Yŏng or Kim Yu-sin) who were deified after death. Gunungsin are true gods.

== In mythology ==
The origin of the Gunungshin are explored in the Gunung Bonpuli. However, there are many other Gunungshin in Korean mythology. The Sangsanbyeol Gunung and Eoksanbyeol Gunung are servant deities of the Janggunshin Ch'oe Yŏng (a general of the Goryeo Dynasty). The Sanshin Gunung are guards of the mountain spirits, and the Seongjoshin Gunung are guards of the deity of the house, Seongju. The Sasal Gunung are Gunungshin who destroy Gwishin, or evil spirits, and the patron of the soldiers whose names have been lost to history. Sasal means 'to kill with an arrow'. Sasal Gunung always carries a bow and a handful of arrows with him. Dodang Gunung are Gunungshin who guard an entire village. Shiwang Gunung defend spirits from attack as they go to the netherworld. The Sashin Gunung are patrons of ambassadors, assassins, and secret agents.

== In Guts ==
Gunungshin appear in many Gut, or shamanistic rituals. The Korean beliefs about the Gunungshin can be gleaned from these rituals.

In a Gut of the Seoul region, there is this line:

"Gunung who have placed three thousand soldiers and five thousand war horses on the trail."

Thus, Koreans believed that one Gunungshin had thousands of soldiers and horses along with him.

In a Gut of Hwanghae Province, the shaman pretends to be Gunungshin by pretending to pierce an enemy's throat with a sword. In another Gut of Gangwon Province, the shaman pretends to be Gunungshin and signifies the strength of Gunungshin by pulling up heavy lead with only his mouth. It is apparent that Koreans believed Gunungshin was a very strong and skilled swordsman.

Gunungshin have the identity of an ancestor deity. In Gyeonggi Province, 'Gunung with the surname Yi' and 'Gunung with the surname Hong' are mentioned; they are the Gunungshin of their respective clans. Gunungshin who defend ancestral deities (Josangshin) are also mentioned.
