= Religious text =

Texts central to a religion's tradition

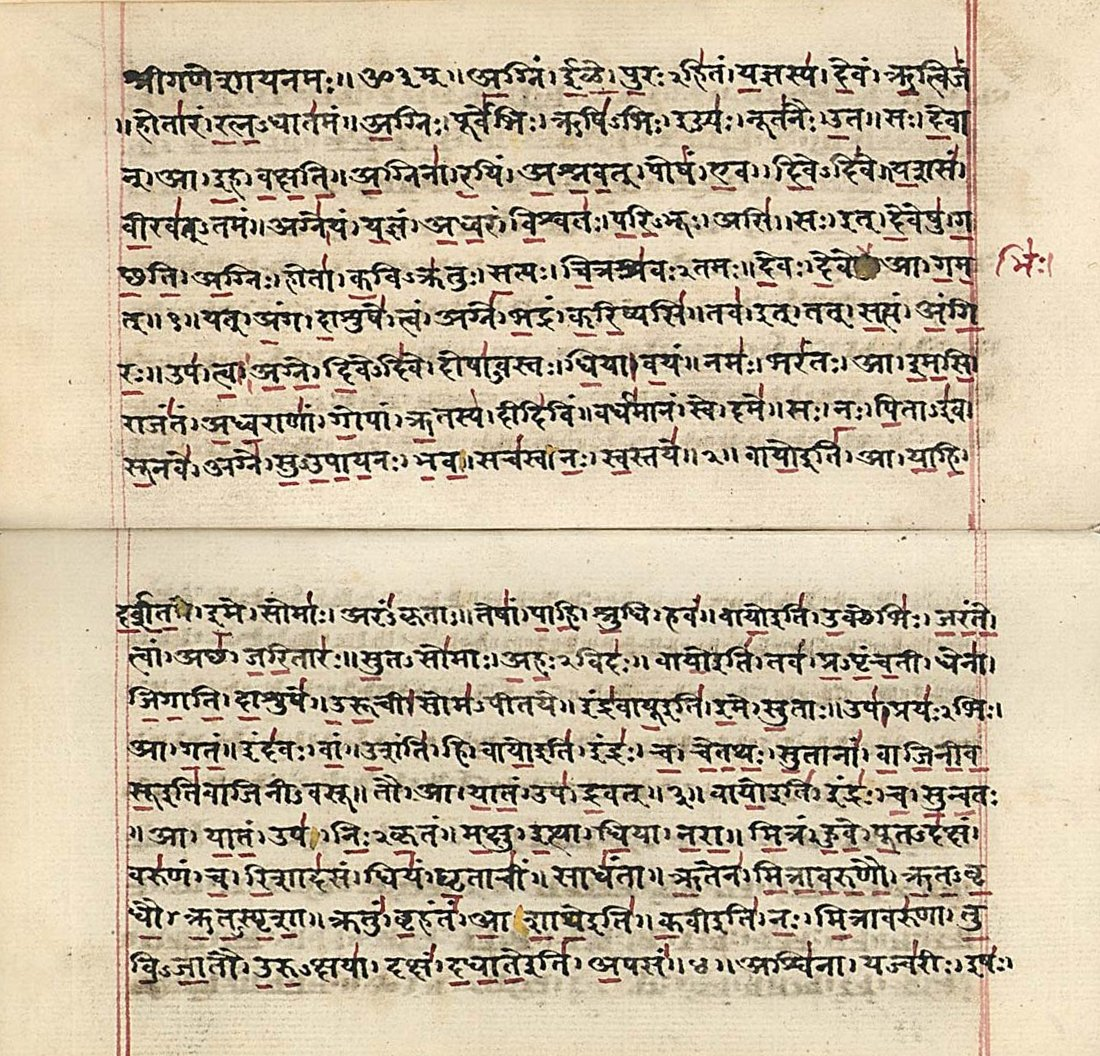
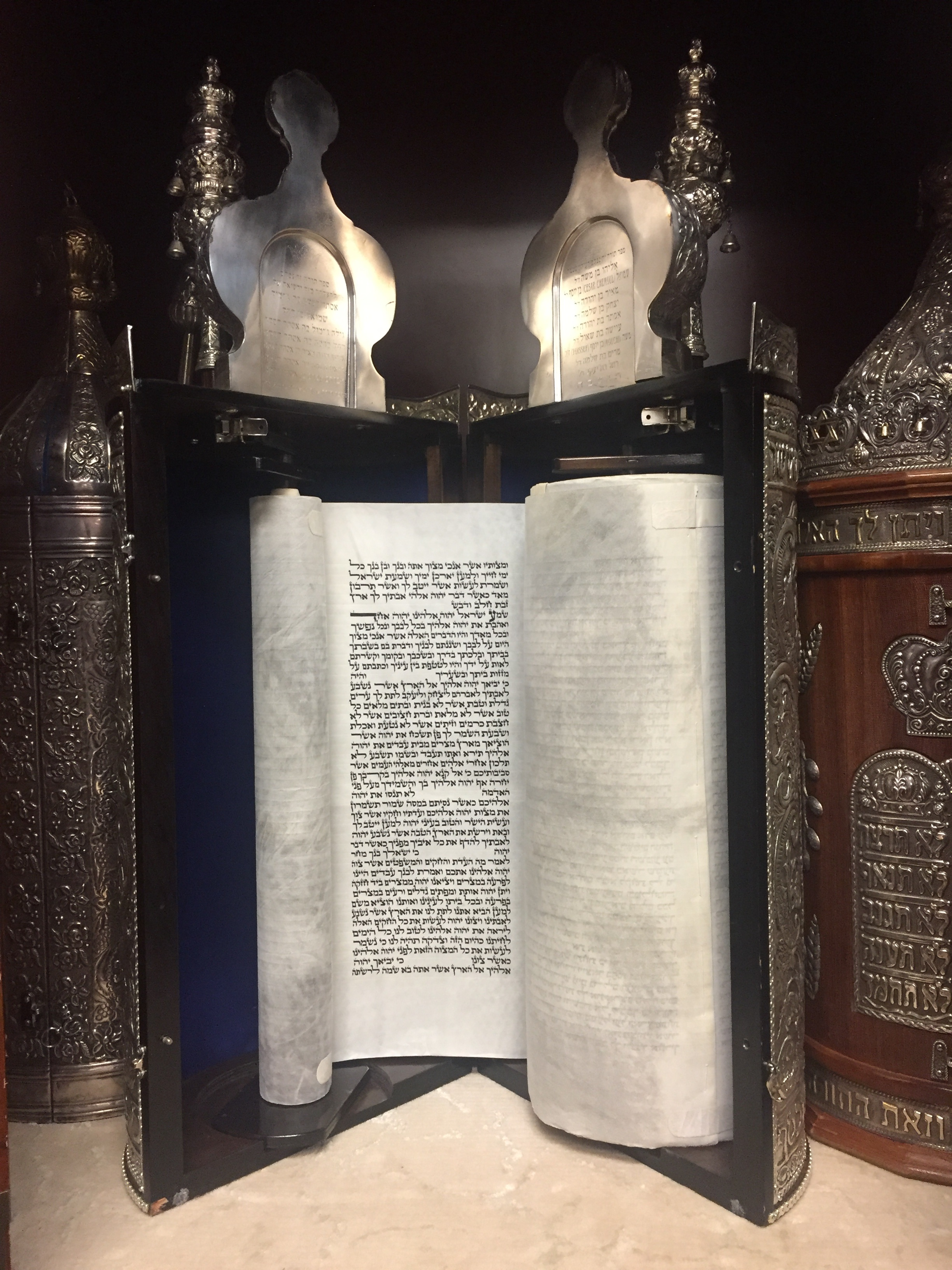
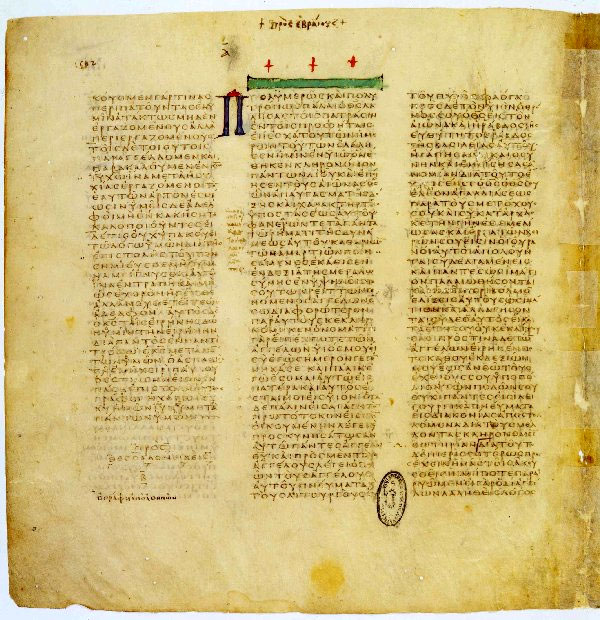
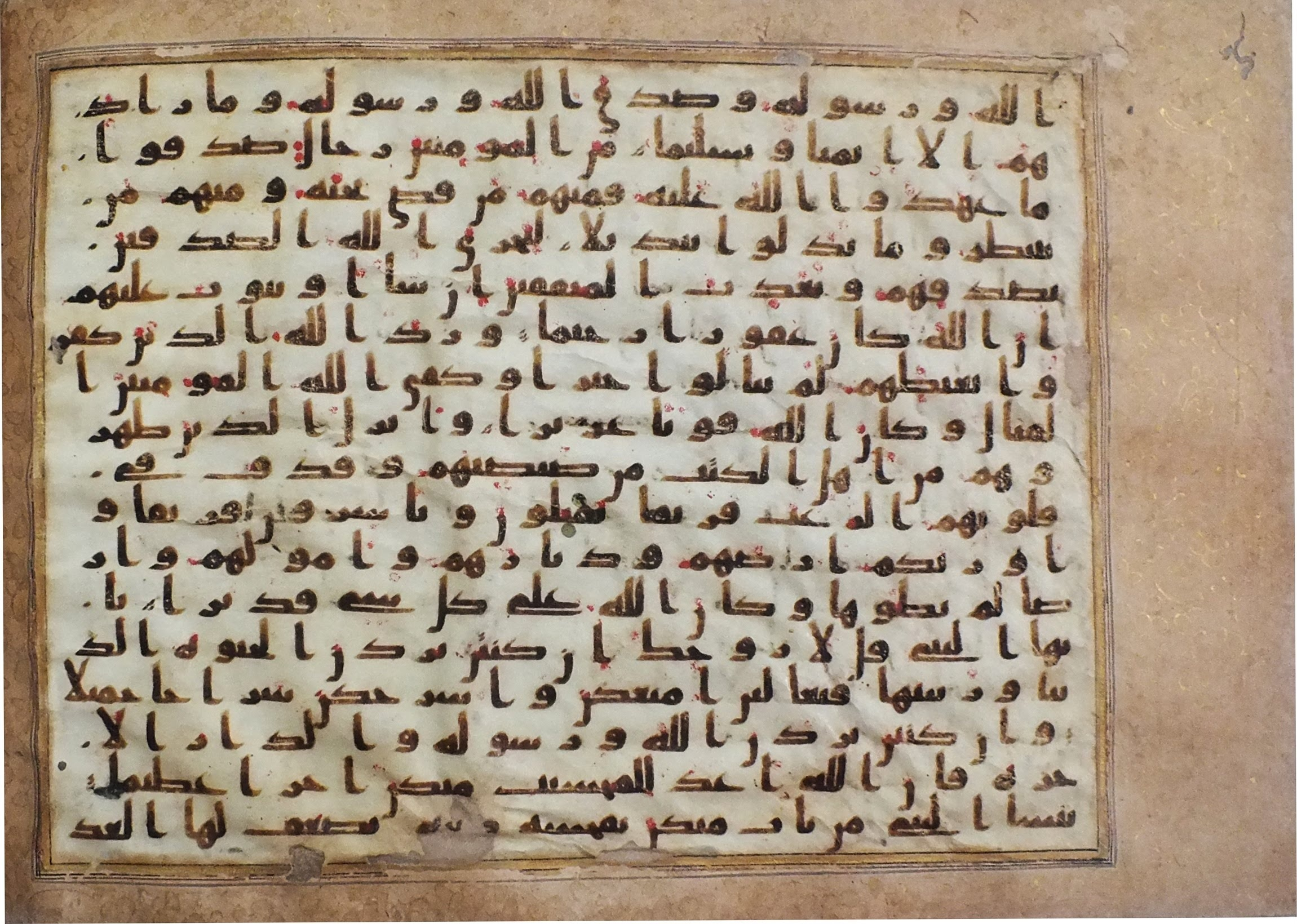
Clockwise from upper left:
- The Rigveda (Vedic chant) manuscript in Devanagari, a scripture of Hinduism, dated 1500–1000 BCE. It is the oldest religious text in any Indo-European language.
- Sephardic Torah scroll, containing the first section of the Hebrew Bible, rolled to the first paragraph of the Shema.
- A page from one of the early Quranic manuscripts (7th century CE), currently preserved in the National Museum of New Delhi, India.
- A page from the Codex Vaticanus manuscript (4th century CE) of the Greek Old and New Testament, currently preserved in the Vatican Library, Rome.

Religious texts, including scripture, are texts which various religions consider to be of central importance to their religious tradition. They often feature a compilation or discussion of beliefs, ritual practices, moral commandments and laws, ethical conduct, spiritual aspirations, and admonitions for fostering a religious community.

Within each religion, these texts are revered as authoritative sources of guidance, wisdom, and divine revelation. They are often regarded as sacred or holy, representing the core teachings and principles that their followers strive to uphold.

== Etymology and nomenclature ==
According to Peter Beal, the term scripture – derived from scriptura (Latin) – meant "writings [manuscripts] in general" prior to the medieval era, and was then "reserved to denote the texts of the Old and New Testaments of the Bible". Beyond Christianity, according to the Oxford World Encyclopedia, the term scripture has referred to a text accepted to contain the "sacred writings of a religion", while The Oxford center of Dictionary of World Religions states it refers to a text "having [religious] authority and often collected into an accepted canon". In modern times, this equation of the written word with religious texts is particular to the English language, and is not retained in most other languages, which usually add an adjective like "sacred" to denote religious texts.

Some religious texts are categorized as canonical, some non-canonical, and others extracanonical, semi-canonical, deutero-canonical, pre-canonical or post-canonical. The term "canon" is derived from the Greek word "κανών", "a cane used as a measuring instrument". It connotes the sense of "measure, standard, norm, rule". In the modern usage, a religious canon refers to a "catalogue of sacred scriptures" that is broadly accepted to "contain and agree with the rule or canon of a particular faith", states Juan Widow. The related terms such as "non-canonical", "extracanonical", "deuterocanonical" and others presume and are derived from "canon". These derived terms differentiate a corpus of religious texts from the "canonical" literature. At its root, this differentiation reflects the sects and conflicts that developed and branched off over time, the competitive "acceptance" of a common minimum over time and the "rejection" of interpretations, beliefs, rules or practices by one group of another related socio-religious group. The earliest reference to the term "canon" in the context of "a collection of sacred Scripture" is traceable to the 4th-century CE. The early references, such as the Synod of Laodicea, mention both the terms "canonical" and "non-canonical" in the context of religious texts.

== History of religious texts ==
One of the oldest known religious texts is the Kesh Temple Hymn of ancient Sumer, a set of inscribed clay tablets which scholars typically date around 2600 BCE. The Epic of Gilgamesh from Sumer, although only considered by some scholars as a religious text, has origins as early as 2150 BCE, and stands as one of the earliest literary works that includes various mythological figures and themes of interaction with the divine. The Rigveda, a scripture of Hinduism, is dated 1500 BCE. It is one of the oldest known complete religious texts that has survived into the modern age.

The earliest dating of the earliest Biblical texts is the 13th-12th centuries BCE. The beginning of the scribal documentation from temple and royal courts is dated to the 8th century BCE and continues until the 5th century BCE.

High rates of mass production and distribution of religious texts did not begin until the invention of the printing press in 1440, before which all religious texts were hand written copies, of which there were relatively limited quantities in circulation.

== Authority of religious texts ==
The relative authority of religious texts develops over time and is derived from the ratification, enforcement, and its use across generations. The process in which texts become accepted as sacred is often formed by historical developments, as well as religious leaders, institutions, and community practices, and may reflect broader social and cultural influences. Some religious texts are accepted or categorized as canonical, some non-canonical, and others extracanonical, semi-canonical, deutero-canonical, pre-canonical, or post-canonical.

"Scripture" (or "scriptures") is a subset of religious texts considered to be "especially authoritative", revered and "holy writ", "sacred, canonical", or of "supreme authority, special status" to a religious community. The terms sacred text and religious text are not necessarily interchangeable in that some religious texts are believed to be sacred because of the belief in some theistic religions such as the Abrahamic religions that the text is divinely or supernaturally revealed or divinely inspired, or in non-theistic religions such as some Indian religions they are considered to be the central tenets of their eternal Dharma. In contrast to sacred texts, many religious texts are narratives or discussions about the specific religion's general themes, interpretations, practices, or important figures.

In some religions (e.g. Christianity), the canonical texts include a particular text (Bible) but are "an unsettled question," according to linguist Eugene Nida. In others (Hinduism, Buddhism), there "has never been a definitive canon". While the term scripture is derived from the Latin scriptura, meaning "writing", most sacred scriptures of the world's major religions were originally a part of their oral tradition, and were "passed down through memorization from generation to generation until they were finally committed to writing", according to Encyclopaedia Britannica.

In Islam, the Sunnah are the traditions and practices of the Islamic prophet Muhammad that constitute a model for Muslims to follow. The Sunnah is what all the Muslims of Muhammad's time evidently saw, followed, and passed on to the next generations. According to classical Islamic theories, the Sunnah are documented by hadith (the verbally transmitted record of the teachings, deeds and sayings, silent permissions or disapprovals attributed to Muhammad), and alongside the Quran (the book of Islam) is the divine revelation (wahy) delivered through Muhammad that make up the primary sources of Islamic law and theology. However, sects of Islam differ on which hadiths (if any) should be accepted as canonical (see criticism of hadith). These examples primarily reflect written traditions; however, in some religions, religious teachings may also be preserved through oral practice rather than fixed written texts.

== See also ==
- List of religious texts
