= Thirumal in Thiruvananthapuram =

As Kalimayai captured the king of Thiruvitankur and began to rule over the people as their king, Thirumal came to Thiruvananthapuram according to Ayyavazhi mythology. This falls under Akilam five in Akilathirattu Ammanai.

== Thirumal goes to Thiruvananthapuram ==
When Thirumal decided to go to Thiruvananthapuram, the temple boy of Sri Rangam and a Brahmin fell on his feet and asked humbly, "Your greatness, your children The Santror are suffering due to the activities of the cruel Kalineesan, why you are going to the land of the neesan?" Thirumal replied, "Before I go to help the Santror, I must advise the neesan. Otherwise, during the judgment, he will claim, 'You took birth among the santror and so you destroyed me and my dynasty.' To overcome that, I must advise him beforehand." Again, the temple boy praised him and asked, "The kalineesan will perform pujas, he will light lamps for you, if you don’t accept it, what is the situation of us who do the same?" From the moment the Kaliyan entered this world, I stopped accepting all these things. Only after destroying the Kaliyan and appointing a rule of Dharma in the world will I accept those things. By saying this, Thirumal walked towards Thiruvananthapuram.

== Thirumal arriving Ananthapuram ==
A pulacchi knew the arrival of Thirumal through a dream. Sensing this, Thirumal hid in a place. The pulacchi advertised this to all, and all of them believed. By knowing this, the Kalineesan erected temples with golden pillars. He created a perfumed atmosphere, and musical instruments were played, and the Pulacchi carried the Theevetti, the family of sin, performed puja. The nampoodiri and the Brahmins praised him and were delighted. These ostentatious festivals were held every day. But in the midst of it all, Thirumal stayed hidden without intent. Although he stayed without intention, the land became most prosperous because of him. So, the people of the land were happy. It received rainfall three times in a month. And the land became an incomparable one.

== Tavam of Neesan ==
When the Neesan ruled like this, he had no offspring and was worried. He fell at the feet of Thirumal and requested him to give him a male child. By hearing this, Thirumal told him he would not have children if he remained there. He also said Neesan would get a child if he went to Kasi and performed Tavam on the riverbank there. He accepted this and went to Kasi to start performing tavam there. When he was on his tavam, he saw a cleric embracing a woman, and Neesan became severely aroused, his semen falling in the water. A white crane swallowed this, became pregnant, and delivered a baby boy in the water. A sage in white, Punal rishi, took the baby who was white in appearance and nurtured him.

This child was raised by the Punal rishi, who taught all the techniques of worldly life to him. And when he attained the age of marriage, he arranged for two girls of the Chenkomatti to marry him and made him the ruler of the land. He led a prosperous life.

== Failure of the Tavam ==
After Neesan's tavam met with failure, he returned to Thiruvananthapuram. Thirumal, knowing this, went in front of the neesan and asked him why he came there. Neesan narrated the whole story and said that because of this, Sivan, who had come to him, told Neesan that he wouldn’t have children anymore. If I have no male child, my words will not be respected. Also, who will rule this country if I have no male child? Hearing this, Thirumal asked him to discuss it with a village astrologer. Kalineesan asked the astrologer about this. He said that, as per the agamas, he would have children, but that his son would not rule the country but rather his Son-in-law. Hearing this, the neesan made his Son-in-law king of the nation.

== Kalineesan defeating Venneesan ==
Meanwhile, the boy born to Kalineesan in Kasi, Venneesan, led a war against Kalineesan. Thirumal sensed this and informed Kalineesan. As soon as Kalineesan gathered a large army, he waged war against Venneesan. Due to the grace and mercy of Thirumal, he won the battle. After this victory, he became very arrogant. He also created new laws in his country.

== Santror as Security ==
He didn't stop with creating new laws. He asked Thirumal to bring him security forces that were courageous, obedient and genuine. But Thirumal replied, "You can bring whoever you think suitable, courageous, and genuine." Hearing this, Kalineesan asked his minister who might be the most suitable for him. The minister said, "No one other than Santror who was genuine could be kept here"

The Santror was called off, and they were ordered to be the security force for the king, Kalineesan. They were given powerful weapons, and all facilities were offered to them.

== Death of the King ==
When the Santror was working as the security of the king, one day, as per the karma of the Santror, they fell asleep while on duty. By using this chance, the people of Kalineesan entered the bedroom of Kalineesan and killed him. When he was about to die, he cursed the Santror by thinking that they supported the people who killed him. The curse is:

"Hey Santror, till my dynasty rules the land, your race will have to do oozhiyam for us."

As the astrologer had told, the Son-in-law of Kalineesan came to the throne as soon as he died. The curse of kalineesan's illusion troubled the Santror as a whole.

The Devas informed Thirumal of the Santror's trouble. Thirumal replied:

"Hey, devas know that the curse given to Santror was an identity for the destruction of Kali. Though the Santror had done much for Kalineesan, he cursed them."

By saying this, Thirumal remained in Thiruvananthapuram with worries.

== Sufferings of Santror ==
Because of the curse, the Santror suffered a lot. They were deeply troubled by the rulers of Travancore (kalineesan). The Santror were diversified by the kalineesan and thereby made the situation comfortable for him. Heavy taxation was implemented on the Santror. Fundamental human rights were prohibited for them. They were subjected to heavy labour and not given proper wages. Many were captured as prisoners, and not even food was given to them. A series of troubles were given to the Santror. Akilattirattu Ammanai is spoken about in great detail. It describes it in five full pages.

Kalineesan imposed a "compulsory free service" system called oozhiyam, which the Santror rendered to the king, the royal family, the high castes, and the state. They had to dig tanks and carry the leaves of palm and plantain trees to various destinations, etc.

Thus, the Kalineesan and his race extorted the labour and the hard-earned produce of the Santror, yet they were ruthlessly kept off from public places, lest they polluted these spaces and the high caste people. Because of their drawing toddy occupation, the Santror were not allowed to go to public places. They were fastened to trees, beaten, and fined if they transgressed these restricted spaces.

The plight of Santror was a life of terror, intimidation, and hegemony, akin to the condition of a lamb in front of a ferocious tiger. If they refused to render oozhiyam (service), their men and women were beaten up, kept behind bars in starvation, and the modesty of the womenfolk was outraged. They served the king, his army, and his people and built palaces for him. They enriched the country with hard labour, but their iniquities remained unabated. They were degraded and despised.

== Advice of Thirumal ==
Having seen all these troubles created by Kalineesan for the Santror, Thirumal visited Neesan and said:

"The reason for your fall and that of your dynasty is only your activities and the troubles you created for the Santror. You, as Kroni, were ready to swallow the world in the first yuga. At that time, the Pooda Guru Munivan came there and advised you. You were not ready to accept the advice, so you were defeated.

In the second Yuga, you were born as Kuntomasali. Then a sage Govi Rhishi gave you greater advice. As you regretted the advice, you and your entire dynasty were destroyed.

In the third Yuga, you were born as two asuras, Thillaimallalan and Mallosivahanan. At that time, sage Roma Rishi advised you. You rejected this advice and perished.

Then in the fourth Kretha Yukam, you were born as Suraparppan and Sinhamuka Asuran. The sage Veeravagu Devar advised you, and you annihilated him and were defeated. In the same yuga, you again took birth as Iraniyan. Sevvukathu Singam advised you, and you were destroyed as you didn't take the advice.

Then in the fifth yuga, you were born as Ten-headed Ravana. You were advised by Vibhishana. You don't take his advice, which resulted in your defeat.

In the sixth yuga, you were born as Duryodhana and were advised by Bheeshma. You disobeyed and were defeated.

In all the previous yugas, you obeyed no one. So, in this Kali Yukam, I myself in my own form am in front of you to advice you. If you wish that you and your dynasty should rule this world, you must discharge all taxes on the great Santror. Don't make them, the children brought up by Patrakali, perform uliyam. If you trouble any Santror, you will be sentenced to hell. If a virtuous chanar woman with pain in her mind cursed you, all your forts and palaces will be leveled. All the roots of your dynasty will be destroyed if you continue this. All your army will disintegrate. Your country will be engulfed and swallowed by the ocean. All the regressive taxation on the Santror should be taken back. The Santror should not be used as coolies. Their lands should be handed over to them, and they should be provided with proper wages. You will be sentenced to terrible hell if you don't obey me"

Neesan replied:

"Hey Mayon, now listen to me. You will talk about the Santror, which was provided with the most facilities. You are supporting the Santror, the caste which is the most backwards. I will not reduce the tax even if I am to be killed. Till then my life exists, and I will use Santror as coolies. I will not care even if you settle with the Santror. Do not approach me with anything related to Santror. You can go anywhere."

== Thirumal deserting Ananthapuram ==
"In all the previous yukams, you regretted me. This is the final chance given to you. No one will be there to help you. Today, you told me to go anywhere. Even now, I am telling you to obey me if you want to save yourself."

Kalineesan replied, "I need 10,000 gold coins for labourers. Daily, in the morning and in the evening, I need a hundred gold coins to perform puja to you. To run all your temples, I need 1100 gold coins. Where will I get this gold if I stop collecting taxes from Santror?"

Thirumal replied, "Did I ask you all these things? Did I ask you to perform pujas every morning and evening? You did pujas for the Brahmins and Namboothiris, and not for me. Don't you see I lie down by placing my head in the south? By this, don't you understand I was not accepting the pujas you performed?"

Hearing this, neesan replied, "If you don't accept what I offered, then why are you staying here? You can go anywhere"

Thirumal replied, "Now I am going to Thiruchendur from your land. Don't forget I will return, and it will be your final day."

Saying this, Thirumal deserted Thiruvananthapuram and walked towards Thiruchendur.

== See also ==
- Ayyavazhi mythology
- Kalineesan
- Venneesan
