= Bön Kangyur and Tengyur =

Collections of canonical texts of the Tibetan Bön religion

The Bön Kangyur and Tengyur are collections of canonical texts of the Tibetan Bön religion. Like the Tibetan Buddhist canon, the Bönpo canon consists of two complementary collections: the Kangyur (Wylie: bka'-'gyur) or translated word, consisting of 179 large volumes containing teachings attributed to Tonpa Shenrab (Wylie: sTon pa gshen rab), the legendary founder of the Bön religion; and the Tengyur (Wylie: brTen ‘gyur) containing commentaries on those teachings, as well as cycles of additional instructions, biographies, and rituals. These canonical texts were supposedly translated from original texts in the Zhang-Zhung language.

== Bön Kangyur ==
The 179 volume Bön Kangyur consists of five sections:

1. Sutra section known as the Do-de (Wylie: mdo sde) (vol. 1–74)
2. The section known as the Boom-de (Wylie: 'bum sde) (vol. 75–144)
3. Mantra (or Tantra) section known as the Ngak-de (Wylie: 'sngags sde) (vol. 145–170)
4. Mind (or Dzogchen) section (Wylie: sems sde) (vol. 171–178)
5. Lineage of the teachings (Wylie: brgyud rim) (vol. 179)

== Bön Tengyur ==
This collection, also known as the Katen བཀའ་བརྟེན། (Treatises Relying on the Word), contains commentaries on the Kangyur, as well as instructions for practitioners.

== Sources ==
- Martin, Dan; Yasuhiko Nagano; Kværne, Per; Kokuritsu Minzokugaku Hakubutsukan, eds. (2003), A Catalogue of the Bon Kanjur, Senri Ethnological Reports, Osaka: National Museum of Ethnology, ISBN 978-4901906128
- Martin, Dan (2003), "Introduction", in Martin, Dan; Yasuhiko Nagano; Kværne, Per; Kokuritsu Minzokugaku Hakubutsukan (eds.), A Catalogue of the Bon Kanjur, Senri Ethnological Reports, Osaka: National Museum of Ethnology, ISBN 978-4901906128
- Karmay, Samten G.; Yasuhiko Nagano; Kokuritsu Minzokugaku Hakubutsukan (2001), A Catalogue of the New Collection of Bonpo Katen Texts, Osaka: National Museum of Ethnology
- Keutzer, Kurt; 0'Neill, Kevin (2009), "A Handlist of the Bonpo Kangyur and Tengyurs", Revue d'Études Tibétaines (17), Paris: l'UMR 8155 du CNRS: 63–128, ISSN 1768-2959
- Achard, Jean-Luc (2015). "On the Canon Bönpo of the Collège de France Institute of Tibetan Studies". La Lettre du Collège de France (9). Collège de France: 108–109. doi:10.4000/lettre-cdf.2225.
