= The Book of Hymns =

Hymnal of The Methodist Church

The Book of Hymns was the official hymnal of The Methodist Church, later the United Methodist Church, in the United States, until it was replaced in 1989 by The United Methodist Hymnal. Published in 1966 by The Methodist Publishing House, it replaced The Methodist Hymnal of 1935 as the official hymnal of the church.

There is a dispute as to the proper title of this book. The cover has the title The Book of Hymns but that is the only place in the book where that title appears. The title page has The Methodist Hymnal: Official Hymnal of the United Methodist Church. The Book of Discipline, as well as other official publications, refer to the hymnal as The Book of Hymns. When it was published it had the title The Methodist Hymnal. Two years after publication the Methodist Church and the Evangelical United Brethren Church (EUB) merged; the EUB was using a hymnal published in 1957. A special session of the General Conference, in 1970, changed the name to The Book of Hymns and assured those who had belonged to the EUB that their hymnal would remain in print. The EUB hymnal was also considered to be an official hymnal of The United Methodist Church.

The Book of Hymns was approved unanimously by the 1964 General Conference. The 1960 General Conference authorized the Commission on Worship to appoint a hymnal committee to revise the official hymnal. The 29 member committee, chaired by Edwin E. Voigt, had a dozen consultants, with the hymnal edited by Carlton R. Young. The book contains 539 texts with 402 tunes of which 122 texts and 119 tunes which previously had not been included. The hymnal has been described as a prescriptive as opposed to a descriptive hymnal, meaning that the hymns and liturgy were meant to shape and mold worship and prescribe what is sung and done.

It contains most, but not all, of the section in The Book of Worship for Church and Home titled Acts of Praise. Musical settings for parts of the Lord's Supper, the worship service and for the canticles were included. The book was noted for adding the word Amen to the end of most of the hymns.

== See also ==
- List of English-language hymnals by denomination
