= Wife of God =

"Wife of God" can refer to:

- God's Wife, a term which was often allocated to royal women during the 18th Dynasty of Egypt
- Heavenly Mother, the wife and feminine counterpart of God the Father in some religions
- Mother goddess, the feminine counterpart of gods in some religions
- Asherah, wife of Yahweh (Yahwism) or El
- The Mother of Life a creation of the Father of Greatness and being in Manicheanism
- Heavenly Mother the Wife of the God of Mormonism
- The Woman of the Apocalypse was seen as the Wife of God in Taiping Christianity
- Spenta Armaiti is married to Ahurha Mazda in Zurvanist Theology

== See also ==
- Mother Nature
- Hera, wife of Zeus in ancient Greek religion and Queen of Gods
- Frigg, wife of Odin and Queen of Asgard
- Queen of Heaven, title of Mary, mother of Jesus
- Sophiology
- Síyáh-Chál#Maid_of_Heaven
- Bridal theology, Mystical Marriage with Jesus in the New Testament
