= Gunung Bonpuri =

- Hangul: 군웅본풀이
- Hanja: 軍雄本풀이
- Revised Romanization: Gunung-bonpuri
- McCune–Reischauer: Kunung-bonp'uri

The Gunung Bonpuri (Korean: 군웅 본풀이), literally Chronicle of the War Gods, is a Korean myth about the Gunungsin, the deities of war. It shares a large resemblance to the Jakjaegeon myth of the 9th century.

== Plot ==
A long time ago, the Dragon Kings of the East Sea and West Sea fought in a bloody war to gain control over the sea. The East Sea was losing the war steadily. To win the war, the Dragon King of the East Sea ordered his son, Choribdongi, to get Wang Janggun (King General), a giant born as the son of Cheonhwang Jeseok, one of the minor deities of the sky, and Jihwang Jeseok, one of the minor earth goddesses. Wang Janggun's height was three meters, and his arms and legs were of iron. His face was red, and flame sprouted his eyes. When Choribdongi met Wang Janggun, Wang Janggun was chopping down an impossibly thick tree. When the tree fell, the sound shook the entire earth.

Choribdongi said that if Wang Janggun went with him to the Dragon Palace, he would be able to control all the treasures of the sea. However, Wang Janggun had hydrophobia, and refused to come. Choribdongi then said that if Wang Janggun came, he would have the highest position in the government. Again, Wang Janggun refused. Finally, Choribdongi promised that if Wang Janggun came, he would be able to marry the daughter of the Dragon King. Wang Janggun accepted, but was worried as he was a hydrophobe. Choribdongi said that he would create a pathway through the water, and that Wang Janggun should make sure to be with him.

Choribdongi did make a water-free pathway underwater, and Wang Janggun met the Dragon King of the East Sea. The Dragon King of the East Sea said that if he tactically retreated in the battle with the Dragon King of the West Sea a few days later, the Dragon King of the West Sea would leap at the joy of finally defeating his adversary. When he leaped in joy, Wang Janggun had to shoot the Dragon King of the West Sea's golden scale beneath his ear.

After a long battle between the two Dragon Kings, the Dragon King of the East Sea retreated deep into the oceans. The Dragon King of the West Sea roared and leaped in joy. As he did so, Wang Janggun shot down the Dragon King of the West Sea with his bow and arrow. The Dragon King of the West Sea's scale was so hard it could not be destroyed even by lightning; however, Wang Janggun pierced the scale with nothing but his strength.

After the death of the Dragon King of the West Sea and the destruction of his undersea kingdom, the Dragon King of the East Sea promised that Wang Janggun could take any object from his Dragon Palace. Choribdongi whispered to Wang Janggun that his sister was carefully hidden inside an old writing box. Wang Janggun said that he wanted the writing box, and because of his promise, the Dragon King of the East Sea had to give up his daughter.

Wang Jangun returned home with the writing box and resumed logging. Whenever he came back after logging, a fine meal was prepared. One day, Wang Janggun hid behind a tree and observed the person cooking the meal. She was the daughter of the Dragon King of the East Sea. Wang Janggun rushed in and proposed to the daughter of the Dragon King of the East Sea. She accepted his offer, and they had three sons; Wang Geon, Wang Bin, and Wang Sarang.

One day, the daughter of the Dragon King of the East Sea returned to the Dragon Palace, leaving her husband and sons to be the Gunungshin, the deities of war. The father, Wang Janggun, became the Gunungshin of China, and his three sons became the Gunungshins of the Middle East, Japan, and Korea. The Gunungshin decide which side shall win a battle, and to win, the army must devoutly serve the respective Gunungshin of their nation.

== In History ==
The Gunung Bonpuli myth, compiled by a Japanese mythographer in the early 20th century (other versions are just a family tree of the Gunungshin), shares much of its plot from the Geotaji myth and the Jakjaegeon myth of the 9th century.

In the Geotaji myth, a man named Geotaji kills a monk with a bow at the request of a Gwishin, or ghost. The Gwishin lets Geotaji marry his daughter, and both live happily ever after. This myth is similar to the Gunung Bonpuli in that a man kills something with a bow at the request of a supernatural being.

In the better-known Jakjaegeon myth, a part of the Goryeo Dynasty founding myth, Jakjaegeon kills an old Gwishin with a bow at the request of the Dragon King of the West Sea, who appears to him in a dream. The Dragon King of the West Sea gives him his daughter in gratitude, and the Dragon King of the West Sea tells Jakjaegeon that his grandson (King Taejo of Goryeo) will be king. Jakjaegeon has four sons, of which the eldest is Yong Geon, the father of King Taejo of Goryeo. However, when Jakjaegeon spots his wife bathing, the wife leaves Jakjaegeon.

This myth is very similar to the Gunung Bonuli. A supernatural being is killed by the bow of the main character at the request of a Dragon King, who both give up their daughter for marriage to the main character. The name of the main characters' eldest sons are the similar: Yong Geon and Wang Geon. Moreover, Wang Geon is the name of King Taejo of Goryeo. The surname of Wang Janggun and his sons are 'Wang'; the surname of the imperial family of the Goryeo Dynasty is 'Wang'.

As can be proved by the similarity of the Jakjaegeon myth and the Gunung Bonpuli, according to Korean mythologists, it is likely that shamans adopted the Jakjaegeon myth for their own use, or that the Goryeo imperial family adopted the Gunung Bonpuli myth for their own use.
