= Akilam five =

Akilam Five is the fifth section of Akilam, which is the primary scripture of Ayyavazhi. It narrates the cruel reign of Kaliyan, the death of two Santror and the subsequent curse given to Kali. It also hints about the start of the Kalineesan dynasty that tortured Vaikundar.

The final passages confess that Narayana as Anantha Padmanabha Swamy deserted Thiruvananthapuram and challenged him that he will come one day to destroy Kali.

== Break down of Vaigai ==
Because of the serious and cruel nature of Kali, all beings caught hold of the evil spirit of Kali. The caste system which was until than a social organisation changed its color as a matter of social dignity with respects to their works. People lost their divine mindset and everyone longed to create an individuality which results in cold-tensions between them. The concept that "all are one" was completely driven out from the society by Kali.

Meanwhile, heavy rainfall caused the Vaigai Dam to break off and much of the lands in the Chola country was sunk in waters. People requested the king for their rescue. For rectifying the damage, the King ordered that one person from each house should go for the work of the dam. Though everyone worked hard, they were not able to rebuild the dam and stop the floods. They admitted this to the King and told that only the Mighty Santror of Puttapuram can accomplish this. The King immediately ordered his minister to bring Santror to his court.

They were brought in front of the king, and he ordered the Santror to repair the damage. But Santror refused to accept his order, saying that carrying mud on their head will affect their social dignity. Since they refused the order of the King one of them was killed but cutting down the head by an elephant. And told to the other Santror that they will also be killed if they refused. They too disagreed and another man was also killed.

== Thirumal at Vaigai ==
All the Seven Logas were stunned by this incident. By now, two of the Santror were killed, and Mother Kaali(Durga) was sent to jail, since she had earlier promised that if she allows any damage to the Santror, she herself will go to jail. By the time, Saint Vidhyadara pleaded for the rescue of the remaining Santror. So Thirumal, in the state of Para brahmam went to Vaigai as the representative of Vanthi (a steamcake seller in Chozha country) and filled the Dam and it got repaired. He then return to Srirangam.

Kaali being struck by the activities of Chola king, cursed him and his nation. The wives of the died Santror too cursed the Chola King and they started performing austerity towards Thirumal for rescuing the Santror from this disaster. Meanwhile, the curse of them began to react in the Chola country. It began from the palace of divinity, Srirangam itself. The priests lost their divine thought and started misbehaving even in the temple. They even started stealing things there in temple which was donated for divine rituals.

== The Velvi of a Priest ==
Observing the happenings in the Chola country, a genuine Poojari(Priest) there in the temple guessed that something bad is going to happen to the country. He advised the other priests to be genuine, but they did not listen. So he started performing Velvi (ritual) towards Thirumal. Since he didn't appear before him he ought to destroy himself jumping into the fire of Velvi. So for his rescue, Thirumal appeared before him and the priest told about the unusual activities of the other priests. Thirumal advised them to go to Thiruvananthapuram. He added that it is no more good time for Chola Kingdom and so we have to go to Thiruvananathapuram. So he advised the priest to be prepared for that.

Meanwhile, Sethira Balakan (a temple boy) and some other priests learned of this and they went to Kailash and pleaded in front of Sivan. So all the devas of Siva Loga along with the Sethira Balakan, pleaded Thirumal that "Why he should go to Thiruvananthapuram?"

== Journey to Thiruvananthapuram ==
Thirumal told that the Neetham can no more be preserved in the Chola Kingdom, and so he has to leave the place. The Devas said that the land of Thiruvananthapuram is already ruled by Kalineesan and that the cruelty of Kali is intolerable. Thirumal told that he knew it very well but He had to go there since, once a saint called Sugu Muni had cursed Him that he must be in Thiruvananthapuram for some time.

Saying this Thirumal started his journey to Thiruvananthapuram. He took Sethira Balakan, Aruna Mamuni and some other devas with him. On the way they come across 55 statues grouped at one place, which were all devas of Brahma Loga once cursed to be as statues and so they were there. Thirumal touched them with his hands, instantly they all got life. They all demanded life in the Bhoologa (world) and so they were granted boons to be so in across 55 nations. Afterwards Thirumal continued his journey and when close to Ananthapuram, they come across a rock which was Ekkala Durga who was once cursed for disobeying the words of Sivan. She was also told that when Thirumal touch you, your cursed will be finished. So now being touched by Thirumal she stood up.

Thirumal asked for the reason of her curse. She told that, "I was then a beautiful woman, the wife of Senthi Rishi. Once Yama saw me and he wanted to take me with him and for that he killed my husband. So I performed austerity towards Sivan to kill Yama. But Sivan appeared before me and told that this is not the time to do so. I didn't agree with, so he cursed me." Hearing this Thirumal told that by the advent of Dharma Yukam, your Tavam will be fulfilled and till then you continue to perform Tavam. Hearing this, Thirumal proceeded to Ananthapuram.

On the way they found devas of four Logas performing austerity there. Thirumal asked the reason and they replied that as per the fate and the words of Vethan they all should be born in the world in the Kali Yuga. They also pleaded to Thirumal that in Kali Yuga they need to be born in the gene of Santror. Thirumal accepted their demand and wished them for their Tavam and continued his journey.

After some time they again come across a case where a Cow and a woman performing austerity. Thirumal asked the cow for the reason for the Tavam. The cow said that this woman is under Tavam for killing my son. So even if my son died, I want him again to resurrect as my son. Then Thirumal asked the reason for the Tavam with the woman. She told that, the lady who was performing Tavam as a cow over there had a son who was in love with me. As I refused, he killed my 14-year-old boy. So I want his boy also to be killed. Hearing this, Thirumal told the lady that you will achieve the aim of the Tavam and told the cow that even if your son would be killed, he will take birth as your son in your next birth (reincarnation) and will be made to perform the Panividai for Vaikundar. Saying this they again proceeded to Thiruvananthapuram.

== Thirumal in Thiruvananthapuram ==
Thirumal reached Thiruvananthapuram and slept (Palli Kolluthal) over there as Anantha Padmanabha Swamy. A Pulayar woman identified the presence of God over there and informed the King about it. So the king built a Temple for him there. Then the Kalineesan who was ruling the land of Thiruvananthapuram had no children. As per the advice of Anantha Padmanabha Swamy, he went to Kasi and performed Tavam for the begetting a child. There his Tavam met with failure but through a crane he had a son named Venneesan.

Then he returned to Ananthapuram and from then onwards the son-in-law rule was adopted in the Travancore kingdom. The reign of Kalineesan was cruel as he tortured the Santror very much and treated them as slaves. Thirumal advised the king (Kalineesan) to stop torturing them. On his refusal Thirumal deserted Thiruvananthapuram and came to Tiruchendur and slept over there.

== See also ==
- Thirumal in Thiruvananthapuram
- Ayyavazhi mythology
- Akilathirattu Ammanai
- Travancore
