= The United Methodist Hymnal =

Hymnal used by The United Methodist Church

United Methodist Hymnal
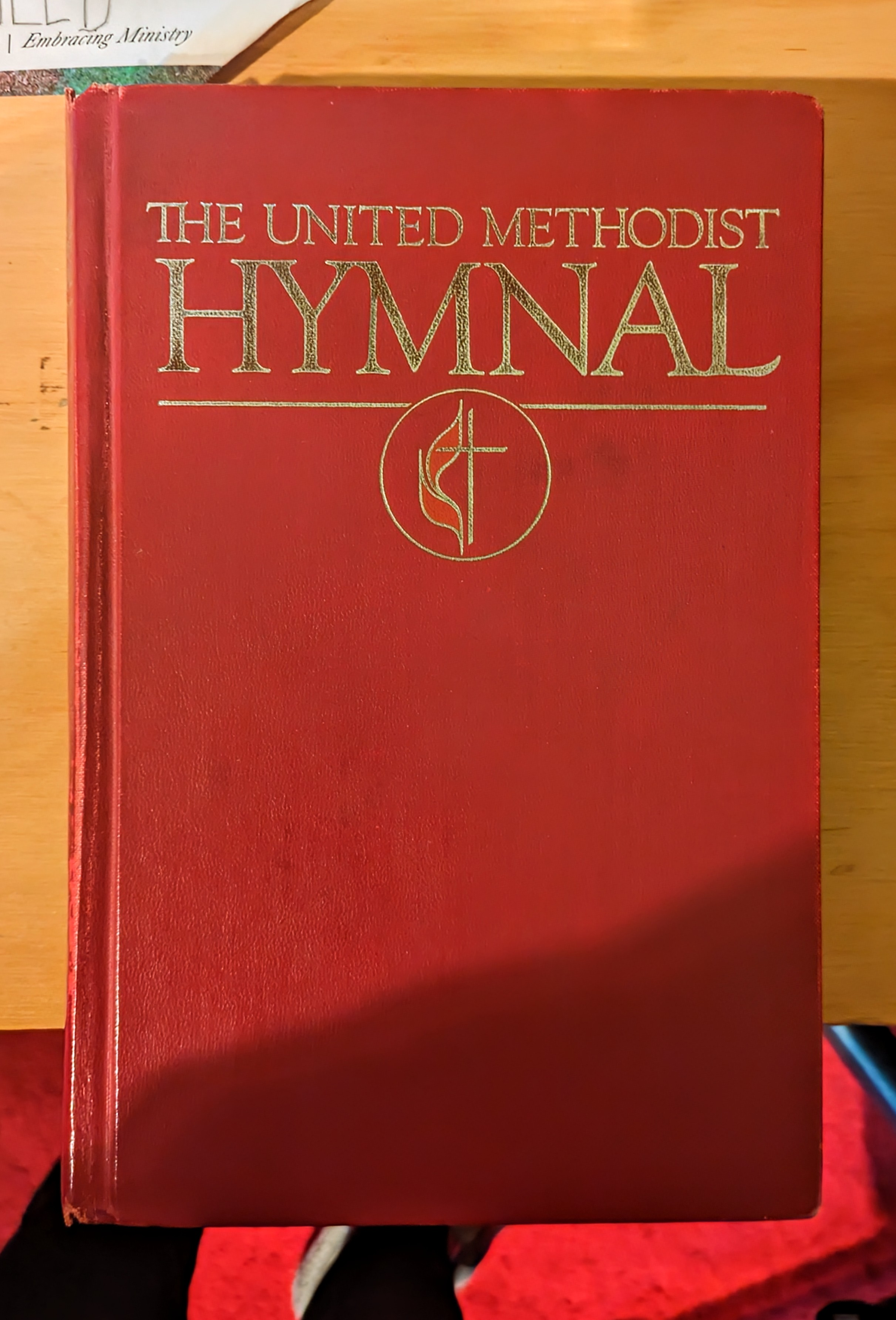
- Author: various
- Language: English
- Publisher: United Methodist Publishing House
- Publication date: 1989
- Publication place: USA
- Media type: hardcover
- Pages: 960
- Preceded by: The Methodist Hymnal
- Followed by: The Faith We Sing

The United Methodist Hymnal is the hymnal used by The United Methodist Church. It was first published in 1989 as the first hymnal for The United Methodist Church after the 1968 merger of The Methodist Church with The Evangelical United Brethren Church. The 960-page hymnal is noted for many changes that were made in the lyrics of certain hymns, so as to modernize the hymnal.

== History ==
Prior to the release of The United Methodist Hymnal, The United Methodist Church used the hymnals that were in use by The Methodist Church and The Evangelical United Brethren Church at the time of the merger. The Methodist Church generally used The Methodist Hymnal, published in 1966 and also known as The Book of Hymns, or a 1982 supplement, while The Evangelical United Brethren Church had its own hymnal, The Hymnal, which was first published in 1957, and other congregations sometimes used special hymnals oriented to different nationalities.

The release of United Methodist Hymnal in 1989 followed the updates of several other denominational hymnals in the previous decade, such as Lutheran Book of Worship in 1978 and the Episcopalian The Hymnal 1982. The United Methodist Hymnal was developed by a revision committee composed of twenty-five members led by editor Carlton R. Young (who also edited The Methodist Hymnal), and chaired by Bishop Rueben P. Job. It was the first hymnal following The Methodist Church's merger with The Evangelical United Brethren Church.

In selecting and arranging hymns, many that contained masculine pronouns were altered so as to include gender-neutral pronouns instead. Male references to God, such as "Master", "Father" and "King", were retained, and a hymn entitled "Strong Mother God" was rejected.

The editors had also considered eliminating militaristic references, and in 1986 the hymnal revision was the subject of controversy as the editors had considered eliminating "Onward Christian Soldiers" and some verses of "The Battle Hymn of the Republic," but retained both hymns after receiving more than 11,000 protest letters. The line "white as snow" was changed to "bright as snow" in "Nothing but the Blood of Jesus", so as to eliminate the imagery of black and white respectively being images of sin and redemption. A line in "O for a Thousand Tongues to Sing" containing references to blindness, deafness and muteness was marked with an asterisk to indicate that it may be omitted. Several international hymns were also selected, including Spanish, Asian and American Indian hymns, as well as Black spirituals. Duke Ellington's "Come Sunday" was also included. In compositions by John Wesley, many of the lyrical changes made by his brother Charles were reverted, and most uses of "thee" were replaced with "you".

The hymnal also contains four forms of the Holy Communion ritual, known as the Service of Word and Table, and also of the Baptismal Covenant, along with several musical settings for both of those services. It also contains the marriage and funeral rites, forms for morning and evening Praise and Prayer, and a Psalter based on the New Revised Standard Version of the Bible but with a few revisions.

Before the hymnal's official release, The United Methodist Publishing House sent a 73-page sampler to several churches. More than three million copies were sold by July 31, 1989, and the total was over four-and-a-half million ten years later. Two supplemental hymnals have been issued, The Faith We Sing in 2000, and Worship & Song in 2011.

There are two other equally official hymnals of The United Methodist Church: Mil Voces Para Celebrar: Himnario Metodista (published in 1996) and Come, Let Us Worship: The Korean-English United Methodist Hymnal (published in 2000).

== Other hymnals used by United Methodists ==
As the use of The United Methodist Hymnal (UMH) is optional in United Methodist congregations, a number of congregations have used other hymnals in the place of, or in addition to the UMH. A number of United Methodist congregations have used Praise and Worship (1952), published by Lillenas Publishing Company; Hymns for Praise and Service (1956), compiled by Homer A. Rodeheaver and George W. Sanville and published by the Rodeheaver Hall-Mack Company; Favorite Hymns of Praise (1967), published by Tabernacle Publishing Company; Hymns for the Family of God (1976), edited by Fred Bock and published by Paragon Associates; and Sing to the Lord (1993), edited by Ken Bible and published by Lillenas Publishing Company.

== See also ==
- List of English-language hymnals by denomination
