= Sihler =

Sihler is a surname deriving originally from Germany.

Notable people with the surname include:

- Andrew Sihler (born 1941), American linguist and comparative Indo-Europeanist
- Ernest Gottlieb Sihler (1853–1942), professor of classics at Johns Hopkins University
- Wilhelm Sihler (1801–1885), German Lutheran minister
- William W. Sihler (born 1937), professor of business administration at the University of Virginia
