= Fürbringer =

Fürbringer – also occurring in the German diaspora variants Fuerbringer or Furbringer – is a surname of German origin. Its literal meaning is witness or more pejoratively tinged accusator or slanderer (from Middle High German vürbringer, an agent noun derived from mhg. vürbringen, which corresponds to New High German vorbringen "to say") and originally described a person who gave oral testimony before a court. In Germany the area of highest density of this family name is located in the eastern part of the Bavarian region of Upper Franconia and in the neighboring Vogtland to the north.

Notable people with the surname include:

- Alfred O. Fuerbringer (1903–1997), American Lutheran minister and college president
- Ernst Fritz Fürbringer (1900–1988), German film actor
- Ludwig E. Fuerbringer (1864–1947), American Lutheran minister
- Matt Fuerbringer (born 1974), American beach volleyball player
- Max Fürbringer (1846–1920), German anatomist
- Otto Fuerbringer (1910–2008), American magazine editor
- Paul Fürbringer (1849–1930), German physician and chemist
- Werner Fürbringer (1888–1982), German U-boat commander and counter admiral
