= Sieck =

Sieck is a surname of North German origin. Notable people with the surname include:

- David Sieck (born 1957), American politician from Iowa
- Harold Sieck (1916–1988), American politician from Nebraska
- Henry Sieck (1850–1916), German-American Lutheran minister, writer, and college president
- Louis J. Sieck (1884–1952), American Lutheran minister
- Robert Sieck (born 1938), American NASA official
