= Bach at the Sem =

Annual Christian music concerts

Bach at the Sem is an annual sacred music concert series held on the campus of Concordia Seminary in suburban St. Louis. Bach at the Sem is an integral part of Concordia Seminary's educational and cultural programming to those who attend the seminary and to the St. Louis metropolitan community. The purpose of the series is to profess the Christian faith through the proclamation of the Church's heritage of sacred and classical music, especially music of Lutheran composers. Bach at the Sem concentrates on music of Johann Sebastian Bach and is also dedicated to the performance of church music from the Renaissance, Baroque, Classical, and Neoclassical periods. Typically, five or six concert performances have been offered each concert season coincident with the academic year of the seminary. The venue is the Chapel of St. Titus and St. Timothy on the campus of Concordia Seminary; the audience is the faculty, staff, and students of the seminary along with metropolitan St. Louis.

The main performing ensemble for Bach at the Sem is the American Kantorei. The American Kantorei is an orchestral and choral ensemble founded in 1968 by its director, the Rev. Prof. Robert R. Bergt.

Robert Bergt's death in July 2011 resulted in the appointment of Dr. Jeral Becker, Director of Vocal and Choral Activities at St. Louis University, as Music Director of Bach at the Sem.
