= Alfred O. Fuerbringer =

Lutheran minister and seminary president (1903–1997)

Alfred Ottomar Fuerbringer (August 11, 1903 – February 26, 1997) was an American Lutheran minister and college president.

Fuerbringer was born in 1903 in St. Louis, Missouri. He was one of several ministers in his family; his grandfather, Ottomar Fuerbringer, was one of the Saxon Lutherans who had built the log cabin seminary in Perry County, Missouri. His father, Ludwig Fuerbringer, was president of Concordia Seminary in St. Louis, the "academic" seminary of the Lutheran Church–Missouri Synod (LCMS), from 1931 to 1943. His brother Otto Fuerbringer was an editor of Time magazine.

Fuerbringer attended Concordia College in Fort Wayne, Indiana, and then Concordia Seminary in St. Louis. After graduation, he was a pastor at several congregations in Oklahoma and Kansas. He then served as president of Concordia Teachers College in Seward, Nebraska, for twelve years before becoming the president of Concordia Seminary in 1953. He retired from the presidency in 1969, but remained at Concordia as the director of continuing education. The selection of John Tietjen as his successor to the presidency was one of the precipitating events in the Seminex controversy that resulted in Fuerbringer and the majority of the faculty and student body leaving Concordia to establish Concordia Seminary in Exile (later named Christ Seminary-Seminex) in 1974. Fuerbringer also eventually left the LCMS and joined the Association of Evangelical Lutheran Churches.

Fuerbringer died on February 26, 1997, in Norman, Oklahoma.
