= American Kantorei =

Chorus and orchestra based in St. Louis, Missouri

The American Kantorei is a chorus and orchestra based in St. Louis, Missouri, and dedicated to performing the music of Johann Sebastian Bach in performances accessible to all audiences.

The American Kantorei was incorporated as an independent Missouri nonprofit organization in July 2017. Previously, the group operated under the auspices of Concordia Seminary in Clayton, Missouri, and performed in the Bach at the Sem concert series for more than 25 years.

Depending on the requirements of each performance, the American Kantorei averages 30 members in the choir and 10 members in the orchestra.

== Repertoire ==
The American Kantorei presents several concerts each year and specializes in the performance of Johann Sebastian Bach’s sacred choral works in the original German, as well as music of Schütz, Buxtehude, Mendelssohn, and other Lutheran composers.

== History ==
Following its beginning in 1955 with a performance of Johannes Brahms’ Deutsches Requiem, the Concordia Cantata Chorus developed into a well-known ensemble dedicated to the music of Bach, Handel, Buxtehude, Schein, Schütz, Praetorius, Monteverdi, Gabrieli, Hillert, Wienhorst, Willan, Britten, Vaughan Williams, and others.

In 1968, the American Kantorei was founded by Concordia Seminary professor Robert R. Bergt.

In 1993, after an interregnum of some years, during which Bergt served as orchestra conductor and graduate professor of chamber music at the conservatory Musashino Academia Musicae in Tokyo, Japan, the Kantorei began an annual series of concerts, denominated Bach at the Sem, on the campus of Concordia Seminary. In1995, Bergt returned permanently to St. Louis and became the artist in residence and Bach scholar-lecturer at Concordia Seminary until his death in 2011.

In 2011, Dr. Jeral Becker, director of vocal and choral activities at St. Louis University, was appointed as interim music director of Bach at the Sem and The American Kantorei.

In 2014, Dr. Maurice Boyer, professor of music at Concordia University Chicago, became the music director for the Kantorei, with Becker continuing as the assistant music director.

The American Kantorei held its last concert at Concordia Seminary in May 2017 and was incorporated as an independent Missouri nonprofit organization in July 2017.
