= Bergt =

Bergt is a surname. Notable people with the surname include:

- Bengt Bergt (born 1982), German politician
- Laura Bergt (1940–1984), Native Alaskan politician and activist
- Robert Bergt (1930–2011), American violinist

== See also ==
- Berg (surname)
