= George V. Schick =

American Lutheran biblical scholar and translator

George Victor Schick (1886 – December 31, 1964) was an American Lutheran biblical scholar and translator of Martin Luther.

Schick was born in 1886 in Chicago. His mother died when he was two years old and he was raised by his paternal grandparents. His grandfather was Rector George Schick, who taught at Concordia College in Fort Wayne, Indiana, from 1856 to 1914. George V. Schick graduated from Concordia College in 1904 and Johns Hopkins University in 1912. He joined the Fort Wayne faculty the year his grandfather retired, 1914.

In 1938, he became professor of the Old Testament and Hebrew at Concordia Seminary in Clayton, Missouri, until his death in 1964. After 1956 he was engaged in translating Luther's Lectures on Genesis from Latin into English for the 55-volume American edition of Luther's Works.

Several of Schick's students later produced significant work. William Foxwell Albright and Jaroslav Pelikan studied under him in St. Louis.

== Works ==
- The stems dûm and damám in Hebrew (1913)
- First year Hebrew exercises Concordia (1950)
- Translator: Luther Lectures on Genesis vol.1-4, vol.5 uncompleted, of 8 vols planned. (1968)
