= Evangelical Lutherans in Mission =

Evangelical Lutherans in Mission (ELIM) was a liberal caucus within the Lutheran Church–Missouri Synod (LCMS). It was formed in 1973 as an oppositional group of clergy following sweeping victories by Jacob Aall Ottesen Preus II (J. A. O. Preus II) and the LCMS's conservative wing, known as Confessional Lutherans, at the synod's 1973 convention in New Orleans. It was not considered a major issue in the LCMS when it began because it originally lacked significant lay support. ELIM gained further momentum in the wake of the 1974 Seminex controversy at Concordia Seminary in St. Louis, Missouri. The organization dedicated a large portion of its resources to supporting the break-away Seminex institution. Only after the Seminex controversy did ELIM begin to gain lay support. However, immediately after the Seminex controversy both the Confessional Lutherans and the ELIM claimed they did not want a schism. But after Preus was easily reelected as president of the LCMS in 1976 ELIM decided to become a confessing movement within the LCMS.

ELIM, along with Seminex, did not fully support the Confessional Lutheran doctrine of Sola scriptura (by scripture alone), which states that all doctrine is derived from the Holy Scriptures, and Biblical innerrancy. The fight between the Confessional Lutherans and the liberals, most of whom held membership in ELIM, is commonly referred to as the Battle for the Bible. Confessional Lutherans claimed victory in the Battle for the Bible in that the smaller liberal wing later left the LCMS to join the Association of Evangelical Lutheran Churches. The Confessional Lutherans remaining in the LCMS viewed this victory as reaffirming the confessional nature of their denomination, as established by C. F. W. Walther, Wilhelm Löhe, and F. C. D. Wyneken.

For several years, ELIM published a newsletter entitled Missouri in Perspective, intended to provide liberal commentary on synodical affairs. Many of the leaders, ministers, and congregations that supported ELIM eventually left the LCMS in 1976 to form the Association of Evangelical Lutheran Churches (AELC), one of the three predecessor churches of the Evangelical Lutheran Church in America (ELCA). The organization survived as a cross-denominational group (composed of AELC and liberal LCMS members) until the ELCA came into existence in 1988.
