= Henry Sieck =

Heinrich "Henry" Sieck (July 1, 1850 – September 7, 1916) was a German-American Lutheran minister, writer, and college president.

Heinrich Sieck was born on July 1, 1850, in Mannheim, Baden, Germany. He came to the United States when he was four years old. He attended Concordia College in Fort Wayne, Indiana. Then he attended Concordia Seminary in St. Louis, Missouri.

Sieck was pastor at the Swedish Lutheran congregation in Memphis, Tennessee, beginning in 1873 and was present for the laying of the cornerstone of the church building.

In 1877, Sieck married Pauline Stutz, who was from Washington, D.C. He became pastor of the Lutheran church in South Bend, Indiana, in 1879, where he also taught German and English in 1880. He then served as a pastor in Erie, Pennsylvania, starting in 1882. He was the pastor of Zion Lutheran Church in St. Louis, Missouri, from 1886 to 1889, and of Salem German Lutheran Church in Stillwater, Minnesota, from 1889 to 1893.

Sieck was the first president of St. John's College in Winfield, Kansas, from 1893 to 1895.

He accepted a call to Mount Olive English Lutheran in Milwaukee, Wisconsin, in 1895 and served until 1905. Sieck was also the secretary for the Wisconsin district of the Lutheran Church–Missouri Synod from 1895 to 1905.

Sieck returned to Zion in St. Louis for its golden jubilee in 1910; his son Louis Sieck was then assistant pastor there. Sieck died at his home in Tomahawk, Wisconsin, on September 7, 1916.

== Selected works ==
- Sermons on the Gospels of the Ecclesiastical Year. St. Louis: Concordia Publishing House, c1904, 1906.
- The Way to Life: 53 Short Sermons. Milwaukee: Northwestern Pub. House, c1905.
- Adventspredigten über ausgewählte Texte nebst Anhang: Reden zur Christfeier; Passionspredigten. St. Louis: Concordia Publ. House, 1906.
- Sermons on the Epistles of the Ecclesiastical Year. St. Louis: Concordia Pub. House, 1912.
- Lenten Sermons. Milwaukee: Northwestern Pub. House, 1913.
