= Norbert Schedler =

American academic (1933–2019)

Norbert Schedler with Rhett Martin, UCA's first Rhodes scholar.

Norbert O. Schedler (March 30, 1933 - May 26, 2019) was a Distinguished Emeritus University Professor of Philosophy and Founding Director of The Honors College at the University of Central Arkansas.

== Education ==
Schedler received a B.A. in Classics from Concordia Seminary in Clayton, Missouri, in 1955. Concordia Seminary in those days was in deep theological turmoil, on the defensive against relativism, science, and secularism. Still, Schedler met with several young members of the faculty in their homes, where they talked about these ideas, especially the notion of "higher criticism", treating the Bible like any other text. Concordia's student bookstore became a liberal site on campus as Schedler, an employee, ordered books they were told not to read. The faculty eventually became aware of this, and took the bookstore over from the students. With fellow Concordia student Bob Smith, Schedler ventured into the classes at nearby secular Washington University in St. Louis beginning in 1955. He enrolled in a course called 'Ethics', the first course he took that was not taught by the church. Schedler found the atheist professor a marvelous human being. He read works by Martin Buber and became convinced that God was a process, entering into conversations with human beings: "And God changed his mind and repented" (Exodus 32:14). "And of course, that's a violation of everything I had ever learned. I mean, God's all knowing, right? God's omniscient, right? And God changed his mind? That can't be right."

Schedler completed his Masters of Divinity in Theology at Concordia Seminary in 1958. For his thesis, Schedler wrote a Wittgensteinian defense of religious language under the supervision of Albert William Levi, S. Morris Eames, and Huston Smith.

As part of his seminary training, Schedler served as a vicar at Christ Church, Washington Parish, in Washington, D.C., a position vacated by Martin Marty. This was a large, highly educated congregation, and Schedler described his preaching assignments as "stressful." He said later that he "took the job very seriously. I knew the stories of the people in the pews. You don't just write a sermon to titillate. You write it contextually because it is embedded in all of these sites, to care for all of these souls." Schedler loved teaching, and parishioners asked to get together and talk about world religions. One of them asked, "Why is Christianity superior to other religions?" a question Schedler reserved for the last class. A story on the class appeared in The Washington Post, which attracted the attention of the local community. Schedler knew nothing of the Post report, and on the last evening of the course, seven Buddhist monks in saffron robes walked into the church classroom. Schedler went through a whole assortment of feelings, from defensiveness to embarrassment to attraction to what they were saying, finally regretting that he could not be like them: "Regret is an interesting emotion, combining as it does both wish and denial. Regret is about affirmation: 'I wish in my next life to be like you.' But this is so often impossible because of the way we are enculturated." While managing Christ Church parish youth events he met the woman who would eventually become his wife, Carol Skeels. Skeels, the daughter of Norman and Betty Skeels of Miami and a journalist, followed him back to St. Louis and took a job teaching English. They have three children: Karen, Ruth Anne, and David.

In 1959, Schedler enrolled at Princeton University after seeing the school's announcement of a new and selective Religion and Philosophy Ph.D. program in the journal Religion and Life. Schedler intended to become a language philosopher, and he was enamored of Alfred North Whitehead, phenomenology, and existentialism. Paul Tillich's method of correlation became the major influence on his thinking. Schedler wrote his dissertation on the method of Austin Farrer and Ian Ramsey under religious scholar George F. Thomas at a time when the history of ideas approach to interpretation of texts characterized most of the faculty.

While completing his thesis, Schedler accepted a call to ministry in the parish of Pilgrim Lutheran Church, Cheltenham, in the Philadelphia suburbs. "Once I was out of Princeton, I went into a parish right outside of Philadelphia. And I wanted to do that because mother church educated me and I felt I owed her. I wanted to teach in a church-related school where I could help young men and young women deal with the questions that I'm sure were coming up when they confronted Darwin and Freud and linguistic philosophy, and existentialism and all that." Schedler led worship services, but also did experimental things like bringing in advisors from all walks of life — lawyers, psychiatrists, doctors, and accountants — to help parishioners better negotiate their lives. He mounted theater performances in the chancel and also religious plays.

== Professional life ==
=== Early faculty appointments and arrival at UCA ===
After a year beginning in his Pennsylvania parish, and before finishing his Princeton Ph.D., Schedler accepted an offer to teach at Concordia Senior College in Fort Wayne, Indiana, where he was an associate professor from 1963 to 1967 and chair of the Department of Philosophy from 1968 to 1969. His students read Plato and Nietzsche in their original languages. Sixty went on to complete doctorates, and several became presidents of colleges, theologians, professors, and philosophers. Accusations of heretical thought dogged him here as well. Conservative teachers and administrators at the school were concerned about liberalizing scholarly practices. "I got up to give a talk in the chapel," he recalled, "and said that my text for that day was going to be on Friedrich Nietzsche, and the text was 'I can't believe a God who couldn't dance.' And I proceeded to give a sermon on how God is a person and God interacts with us, and if we pray there's the possibility that we could convince God to do otherwise as Abraham had done." Following the talk, members of the Religion Department appealed to the president and board of trustees, asking that he be fired. The incident led Schedler to question his continued service to the school: "I could see more and more that I was in the wrong place." He returned to his dissertation research, completing his thesis in 1967. The school later closed in the Seminex controversy as Missouri Synod leadership began questioning professors who used historical-critical methods for biblical interpretation or stressed the importance of the Gospel over other scripture.

In 1967, Schedler became a Visiting Associate Professor in the Department of Philosophy at Purdue University, replacing Calvin Schrag. He taught undergraduate and graduate classes, including courses on contemporary ethics, and after one year secured a full-time appointment at Purdue University Fort Wayne branch. He became chair of the Department of Philosophy in 1969, and worked with the Center for Studies of the Person. Schedler rose to full professor rank in 1973. He inaugurated a course in women's studies and another in men's studies, and taught about themes like the future of marriage, the environment, and human sexuality.

Still, he felt something was lacking. He reached an impasse while serving as a Visiting Research Associate studying the environmental impact of ethical theories at the University of California, Berkeley and Stanford University in the 1975-1976 academic year. Relates Schedler, "I was sitting on the side of a hill, and I could look down and see the San Francisco Bay. My eyes went over two interstates, each of which had 12 lanes and all these people. I was thinking, do I want to go back to Purdue with twenty-something faculty, 30,000 students, and all the hassles of that, or do I want to go to an 'underdeveloped country,' to a small university where I can spend a lot of time with students, raise my kids, and not be under that kind of pressure."

His concerns stemmed, in no small measure, from the research he was doing. Schedler had written part of a PBS radio script on the ethical values implied by controversies surrounding the channelization of rivers in Indiana, Ohio, and Illinois, and in 1975, published a now widely anthologized essay "Our Destruction of Tomorrow: A Philosophical Reflection on the Ecological Crisis." Said Schedler in an interview, "Our problem is the seeming inevitable slide toward making the world into one huge Los Angeles. The forces that move history are beyond our ken and they are moving rapidly, like the test pilot who radioed back to earth, 'I'm lost, but I'm making record time.' So many people feel like this about what is going on around them." He also was drawn to the meaning-centered, face-to-face scale of life portrayed in E. F. Schumacher's essay collection Small is Beautiful: Economics as If People Mattered. Schedler applied to teach at the University of Central Arkansas, a small university nestled in the town of Conway, and became the head of the Department of Philosophy (1976-1985). "I think participatory democracy can best be realized in small communities, where people still have control over their destiny," he said in an Arkansas Gazette interview.

McAlister Hall, current home of the Honors College.

=== Origins and growth of the UCA Honors College ===
Schedler took to his students and new post immediately. In 1978 he said, "I particularly enjoy the eagerness of Arkansas students to learn and their eagerness to do hard work I find them every bit as capable as any students I have had. They have not yet succumbed to the all-pervading indifference and weariness many students in other sections of the country exhibit to the so-called big questions."

On a hot August day in 1981 then President Jefferson Davis Farris Jr. came to rest next to Schedler on a concrete bench under a large oak tree outside UCA's Administrative Building. Schedler asked Farris if the university could offer remedial courses to students who needed them, could it not also offer a comprehensive program for what he called the "severely gifted"? What if it could start an Honors College offering talented students an intensive approach to learning within the broader university? What if it could democratize a first-rate education in a state not otherwise recognized for educational excellence? "The context for the conversation was our desire to do more for our good students academically and to help recruit and keep good students," wrote Schedler, "especially if UCA was to make its mark as the quality undergraduate program in the state." Farris said little that day, letting his friend talk through the idea, but three days later he got a note: "That is one of the best ideas I've heard of in a long time. I want one of those by next fall. What do you need?"

Schedler had actually begun thinking about founding an Honors College on the campus almost a year earlier. The idea for such an institution first emerged in a conversation between Schedler and Michael Kelley, another faculty member. Schedler and Kelley argued, first to fellow professor Phillip Anderson and then to administration officials, that the establishment of an Honors College might help UCA recruit and retain talented undergraduates, and improve the stature of the university as a whole. President Farris, Vice President Marvin DeBoer, and Dean Robert M. McChesney all agreed that the idea had merit, and recommended that a full study be undertaken to consider Schedler's proposal.

Schedler accepted the university's invitation to create the UCA Honors College and was named its first director. Schedler initiated an Honors pilot program in the fall of 1982 with an initial appropriation of six hundred dollars. Other early contributors of time and talent included UCA faculty members James Brodman, Eugene Corcoran, Robert Lowrey, and Helen Phillips. The first recruiting class of 1982 included sixty freshmen, together comprising an average ACT score of 26.8. A special Honors Center for honors class instruction was outfitted in the summer of 1983. The Honors program derived its pedagogical underpinnings from the traditional small liberal arts college. The Honors College jealously guarded its small class sizes, intimate teacher/student relationships, a dedicated faculty with tenure in Honors, and intense studies of a variety of interdisciplinary subjects.

Schedler's thoughts about the special developmental curriculum offered in the Honors College are outlined in two documents, The Lively Experiment and The Challenge. These remain the foundational documents of the UCA College.

=== Teaching philosophy and courses taught ===
Schedler's lectures often focused on matters of environmental ethics, philosophy of religion, and the philosophy of honors education. Yet he took an interdisciplinary approach to learning and integrative approach to scholarship in core Honors classes like 'The Search for Self' and 'The Search for Community.' "As I poke around into other people's ideas and my own," he said, "I am suddenly confronted with a whole set of ideas - a whole view of the world. That is what has fascinated me all my life. And that is why as long as I find another person to talk with I will continue to try to expose what conceptual scheme lies behind our thinking and doing."

He worried about the effects of mass media on both university learning and the public square. "Power now goes not to the funded wisdom of the race or to those of quick mind, but to the image and the image makers," he wrote in a 1990 essay. "What compels us is not the past or ideas but what gets noticed, that is, the image, because it has become the style. ... Everything is viewed, (not heard or reasoned) as if it is a spectacle and the viewer is like an art critic." He worried when students came up after a lecture and commented not on the ideas but on his bright white New Balance tennis shoes or a snappy bow tie: "Usually, they watch me as if I were a TV show and then say that my talk was 'good' or 'neat.'"

Schedler remained a believer, not a doubter, throughout his life but recognized that questions about matters of faith often arise: "I've always been a pastor, not an iconoclast or idol smasher. The goal in my interactions with students is to create live options for living in the world and not feeling schizophrenic. I'm trying to do that for myself too." In his class, 'Everything You Always Wanted to Know about Religion but Were Afraid to Ask,' he said outlandish things not to upset students, but rather to arouse their curiosity and challenge their superstitions.

Other courses taught:

- 'The Axis of Evil'
- 'Mirror of Modern Society: American Musical Theater'
- 'Senior Seminar'
- 'Trampled Under Foot: A Look at Contemporary Oppression'

=== Scholarship ===
- "Paul Tillich's Theory of Symbol," M.Div. thesis, Concordia Seminary, 1958.
- Articles on "Tillich" and "Luther" for Seminarian, 1956 and 1958.
- "A Philosophical Analysis of the Method of Austin Farrer and Ian Ramsey," Ph.D. diss., Princeton University, 1967.
- Talk About Talk About God: A Historical Introduction, Concordia Senior College, 1968.
- Philosophy of Religion: Contemporary Perspectives, New York: Macmillan, 1974.
- "Our Destruction of Tomorrow: A Philosophical Reflection on the Ecological Crisis," in Ethical Issues, ed. by William R. Durland and William H. Bruening, 247-269 (Palo Alto, CA: Mayfield Publishing Co., 1975).
- "Don't Treat Me Like Dirt! (In Defense of a Land Ethic)," Nebraska Humanist, Spring 1982.
- "Ethics," in World Book Encyclopedia, 1989.
- "Thought's Body: A New Habitat for 'Religious Humanism,'" Forum for Honors vol. 20, no. 1 (Winter/Spring 1990), 17-28.

=== Professional distinctions ===
- Lilly Foundation Junior and Senior Fellow (Princeton University)
- John F. Kennedy Outstanding Educator of the Year (1972-1973)
- Distinguished Teacher Award (Purdue University Fort Wayne, 1975)
- Danforth Associate (1979-1985)
- Board of Directors, The Marshall T. Steel Center for the Study of Religion and Philosophy, Hendrix College
- Board of Directors, Arkansas Endowment for the Humanities (1980-1985)
- Humanities Consultant, University of Arkansas Medical Center (Little Rock, AR)
- Review Board, Environmental Ethics
- Editorial Consultant, World Book Encyclopedia
- Testimony, U.S. Senate, on the Humanities and Educational Reform (1985)
- Special Commendation, UCA Board of Trustees, for initiative leading to foundation of The Honors College (1986)
- National Consultant, National Collegiate Honors Council (1987-1992)
- Faculty Development Seminar Leader (Arkansas College, Batesville, 1988)

=== Professional society memberships ===
Schedler is a past or present member of the American Academy of Religion, the American Philosophical Association, the Arkansas Philosophical Society, the Center for Process Studies, the National Collegiate Honors Council, and the Society for Religion and Ecology. Schedler is a founding member of the Arkansas Honors Association (also known as "AHA!").
