= Robert P. Scharlemann =

Radical theologian

Robert P. Scharlemann (April 4, 1929 – July 10, 2013) was a radical theologian best known for his theological works on the being of God and as an interpreter of Paul Tillich. Scharlemann taught at the University of Iowa and the University of Virginia.

== Career ==
Scharlemann received a B.A. and a B.D. from Concordia Seminary of St. Louis, Missouri, before going to the University of Heidelberg for his doctorate under a Fulbright Scholarship. After briefly teaching at both Valparaiso University and the University of Southern California, he became Professor of Religious Studies at the School of Religion at the University of Iowa in 1963. He remained there until 1981, when we became Commonwealth Professor of Religion at the University of Virginia. In addition to his teaching posts, his work included a stint as editor of the influential Journal of the American Academy of Religion. He was also a moving force in the emergence of the North American Paul Tillich Society. He died on July 10, 2013.

== Theological works ==
Scharlemann's more significant contributions to theology fall into two categories. First, Scharlemann has written a number of books and essays that investigate the nature of thinking theologically. These included the influential The Being of God. The Death of God theologian Thomas J. J. Altizer wrote in his autobiography that "Robert Scharlemann is the philosophical theologian who once most engaged me, and I regard his The Being of God: Theology and the Experience of Truth as a truly seminal theological work. Here not only are philosophical and theological thinking truly united, but the Crucifixion is unraveled in thinking itself, and in pure thinking itself. ... Scharlemann's formula, 'the being of God when God is not being God,' is not simply an assault upon the metaphysical God, but upon every Godhead manifest apart from the Crucifixion..." In addition to this work, Scharlemann published a volume of essays entitled Inscriptions and Reflections: Essays in Philosophical Theology. These further examine themes found in The Being of God. Scharlemann is also known for his works interpreting the theological system of Paul Tillich. Of decisive influence was his early work, Reflection and Doubt in the Thought of Paul Tillich (New Haven: Yale University Press, 1969).

== Bibliography ==
As primary author:

- The Being of God: Theology and the Experience of Truth (New York: Seabury, 1981).
- With Julian N. Hartt and Ray L. Hart. The Critique of Modernity: Theological Reflections on Contemporary Culture (Charlottesville: University Press of Virginia, 1986).
- Inscriptions and Reflections: Essays in Philosophical Theology (Charlottesville: University Press of Virginia, 1989).
- The Reason of Following: Christology and the Ecstatic I (Chicago and London: University of Chicago Press, 1991).
- Reflection and Doubt in the Thought of Paul Tillich (New Haven: Yale University Press, 1969).
- Religion and Reflection: Essays in Paul Tillich's Theology (Munster: LIT Verlag, 2005).
- Thomas Aquinas and John Gerhard (New Haven: Yale University Press, 1964).

As editor:

- Negation and Theology (Charlottesville: University Press of Virginia, 1992).
- Theology at the End of the Century: A Dialogue on the Postmodern (Charlottesville: University Press of Virginia, 1990). Includes essays by Scharlemann, Mark C. Taylor, Charles Winquist, and Thomas J. J. Altizer.
