= Adolph F. Meyer =

American pastor

Adolf F. Meyer (c. 1899 – 1988) was an American Lutheran pastor who died on July 6, 1988, at the age of 89. He graduated from the St. John's College in Winfield, Kansas, and Concordia Seminary in St. Louis. He then earned a master's degree from Columbia University and eventually a doctorate from Concordia Seminary, St. Louis. From 1923 to 1970 he served as a pastor of St. Mark's Lutheran Church in Yonkers, New York. He had four sons: Richard and Paul, who live in California; William, who lives in Connecticut; and James, who lives in Maryland. He also had a daughter, Ione Mensing who resides in New Jersey. He was predeceased by his wife, Ione (née Zuhlke), in 1982; they had 13 grandchildren.
