= Berthold von Schenk =

American Lutheran pastor (1895–1974)

Berthold von Schenk (1895–1974) was a pastor of Lutheran Church – Missouri Synod and pioneer of Lutheran liturgical renewal.

Von Schenk was trained for ordained ministry at Concordia Seminary in St. Louis, Missouri, and served first as pastor of a mission congregation in that city, Bethesda Lutheran Church. He then served as an inner-city pastor at Our Saviour Lutheran Church and School in The Bronx, New York. He was an internationally renowned author and scholar. He participated in the first ecumenical Protestant-Roman Catholic consultations prior to Second Vatican Council.

He was the son of Walter von Schenk (1852-1921), who had come from Germany to the United States and was a member of the Schenck zu Schweinsberg family. He and his descendants dropped the long version of the family name.

In an article published in 2010 it was claimed that Berthold von Schenk was a cousin of Claus Schenk Graf von Stauffenberg, who tried to assassinate Adolf Hitler. However, this is not the case as the families Schenk zu Schweinsberg and Schenk von Stauffenberg are not related.

== Works ==
- The Presence: An Approach to the Holy Communion. Published by E. Kaufmann, Inc, 1945, 189 pages
- The Presence: An Approach to the Holy Communion. Edited by Paul Robert Sauer. Published by The American Lutheran Publicity Bureau, 2010, 174 pages.

== Literature ==
- Berthold Von Schenk (1895-1974): Pioneer of Lutheran Liturgical Renewal By C. George Fry, Joel R. Kurz. Published by E. Mellen Press, 2004 ISBN 0-7734-6550-2
- Lively Stone: The Autobiography of Berthold Von Schenk By B Von Schenk, C George Fry, Joel R Kurz. Published by American Lutheran Publicity Bureau, 2006 ISBN 1-892921-07-3
