= Louis J. Sieck =

Lutheran minister and seminary president

Louis John Sieck (March 11, 1884 – October 14, 1952) was a Lutheran minister. He was the president of Concordia Seminary in St. Louis from 1943 to 1952.

== Early life and education ==
Sieck was born in Erie, Pennsylvania, on March 11, 1884. His father, Henry Sieck, was a Lutheran minister and president of St. John's College in Winfield, Kansas, from 1893 to 1895.

Sieck attended Walther College in St. Louis; St. John's College in Winfield, Kansas; Concordia College in Milwaukee; and Concordia Seminary in St. Louis. He was ordained in 1904. In 1939, he received an honorary Doctor of Divinity from Concordia Seminary.

== Career ==
=== Ministry ===
Sieck's first call was to Emmanuel Lutheran Church in Hamburg, Minnesota. He came to Zion Lutheran Church in St. Louis as assistant pastor in 1905, becoming pastor in 1914 following the death of pastor Charles F. Obermeyer, his father-in-law. He was involved with several Lutheran organizations, including the St. Louis Lutheran Publicity Organization and The Lutheran Witness. Sieck served as president of the board of directors of KFUO, a radio station owned by the LCMS, from 1926 to 1943. At the 1933 annual Lutheran convention at Concordia Seminary, he spoke of the need for the church to preach and teach rather than focus on the secular.

=== Concordia Seminary ===
Sieck served on the Board of Control of Concordia Seminary from 1939 to 1943. In 1943, Sieck left Zion Lutheran Church to become the president of Concordia Seminary following the end of Ludwig E. Fuerbringer's tenure. During his ten years as president, enrollment reached a record high of 840 students and several new buildings were built. He taught pastoral theology.

Sieck and fellow Lutheran minister Alfred Doerffler were reportedly briefly involved in the events now known as exorcism of Roland Doe in 1949.

At the time of his death, Sieck was chairman of the National Advisory Emergency Planning Council of the Evangelical Lutheran Conference. He was also vice-president of the State Historical Society of Missouri and served on the board of Valparaiso University.

== Personal life ==
Sieck married Ottilie Obermeyer, the daughter of Charles F. Obermeyer. They had two sons, Lewis and Charles.

== Death ==
Sieck died of an internal hemorrhage on October 14, 1952, at Barnes Hospital in St. Louis. He was buried at New Bethlehem Cemetery in St. Louis County, Missouri.

Concordia Seminary's Graduate Hall, built in 1951, was renamed Sieck Hall in his honor.

== Selected works ==
- Sieck, Louis J; Barthel, John D (1910). Hymnal of Zion Ev. Lutheran Sunday School, 21st and Benton Streets, St. Louis, Mo. St. Louis: Press of Monarch Lithographing & Printing Co. OCLC 844519293.
- Sieck, Louis J. (1943). The Empty tomb; sermons for the Easter season. St. Louis: Concordia Publishing House. OCLC 3638126.
- Stöckhardt, G.; Burhop, William Charles; Sieck, Louis J. (1945). The glory of Golgotha;. St. Louis: Concordia Publishing House. OCLC 2855885.
