= G. Christian Barth =

Lutheran minister and college president (1883–1965)

G. Christian Barth (May 12, 1883 – February 17, 1965) was an American Lutheran minister and seminary president.

Barth was born on May 12, 1883, in Sauk County, Wisconsin. He graduated from Concordia College in Fort Wayne, Indiana, in 1902 and from Concordia Seminary in St. Louis, Missouri, in 1905. The first congregation he served was in Bertrand, Nebraska, from 1905 to 1910. He then served from 1910 to 1921 as the pastor of St. Luke's Evangelical Lutheran Church in St. Louis.

Barth became president of Concordia College in Milwaukee, Wisconsin, in 1921 and resigned in 1934. He was also known for radio broadcast work. He then moved to Cincinnati, Ohio, to become the minister at Concordia Lutheran Church. He was president of Concordia Theological Seminary in Springfield, Illinois, from 1946 to 1952. He then became the pastor of St. Paul's Lutheran Church in West Allis, Wisconsin, from 1952 until his retirement in 1960.

He was married to Louise Schneemann Barth and had three sons and four daughters. Two of his sons, W. L. Barth and Karl L. Barth, were also Lutheran ministers; the latter became president of Concordia Seminary in St. Louis.

Barth died in West Allis on February 17, 1965, and was buried there.
