= Andrew Sihler =

American linguist

Andrew Littleton Sihler
- Born: 1941 (age 84–85)
- Occupations: linguist, Indo-Europeanist

Andrew Littleton Sihler (born 25 February 1941 in Seattle) is an American linguist and comparative Indo-Europeanist.

== Biography ==
Sihler received his Bachelor of Arts cum laude in 1962 from Harvard College, where he studied Germanic languages, literature, and linguistics. He earned his Master of Arts from Yale in 1965. Taking his doctorate in 1967, Sihler trained in general linguistics but with a concentration in historical-comparative linguistics — Indo-European in particular — studying under Warren Cowgill and Stanley Insler, among others. Upon graduation, he joined the faculty of the Department of Linguistics at the University of Wisconsin–Madison, from which he retired in the spring of 1999.

Sihler has contributed to Indo-European linguistics by showing that Edgerton's Law (an extension of Sievers' Law) is untenable when all the evidence is taken into account. In addition, he has written a comparative grammar of Greek and Latin intended to replace the one written by Carl Darling Buck some sixty years previously.

Andrew's brother William W. Sihler is a professor of finance in the Darden School of Business at the University of Virginia. The Sihler brothers are the grandnephews of Ernest Gottlieb Sihler and great-grandsons of Wilhelm Sihler. Gottlieb was a classics scholar whose works show little interest in historical linguistics. Wilhelm's university training was in philosophy, though he early was drawn to theology instead. He published short works on a variety of subjects.

== Major works ==
- New Comparative Grammar of Greek and Latin (Oxford University Press, 1995; ISBN 0-19-508345-8)
- Language History: An Introduction (John Benjamins, 2000; ISBN 1-55619-969-4)
- Edgerton's Law: The Phantom Evidence (Carl Winter, 2006; ISBN 3-8253-5167-X)
