= Georg Schick =

German-American Lutheran pastor, scholar and professor

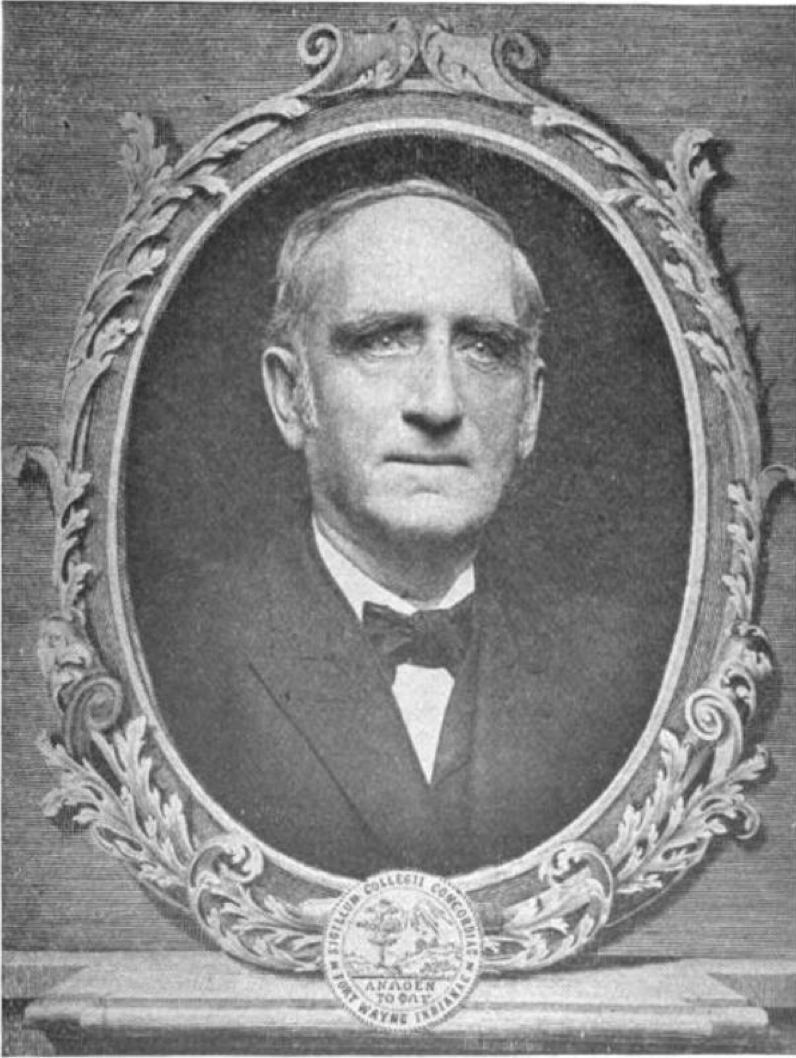
- Born: February 25, 1831; Bad Homburg vor der Höhe, Landgraviate of Hesse-Homburg
- Died: January 3, 1915 (aged 83); Fort Wayne, Indiana
- Education: University of Erlangen, Heidelberg University
- Spouse: Wilhelmina Christina Zimmermann
- Church: Lutheran Church–Missouri Synod
- Congregations served: Immanual Lutheran Church, Chicago, Illinois
- Offices held: Rector, Concordia Gymnasium, St.Louis, Missouri; Professor, Corcordia College, Fort Wayne, Indiana

Georg "Rector" Schick (February 25, 1831 – January 3, 1915) was a German-American Lutheran pastor, scholar, and professor of classical languages.

He was one of the first Rectors (Headmaster) of the Concordia College in St. Louis, Missouri.

== Life ==
=== Early years ===
Georg Schick was born in Bad Homburg vor der Höhe on February 25, 1831. Having shown signs of unusual talents, he was permitted to enter the Gymnasium at Frankfurt-am-Main for his secondary education. He was confirmed under Friedrich Mergner, who was a Lutheran pastor and composer of hymns.

=== University education ===
Schick matriculated from Heidelberg University on May 10, 1851. He also did coursework at the Friedrich Wilhelm University in Berlin, and at the University of Erlangen. He sat for his examinations and passed with special honors on July 29, 1851.

=== Immigration ===
In the mid 19th century in Germany, a clergyman named Wilhelm Löhe made public appeals regarding the shortage of German-speaking Lutheran clergy in North America. Moved by these appeals, Schick moved to the United States.

=== Pastor at Emmanuel Church in Chicago ===
On September 10, 1854, Schick was installed as pastor at the Immanuel Church in Chicago, Illinois. He served the congregation there for two years until he was sent to Concordia College in St. Louis to teach classical languages.

=== Teacher at Concordia College ===
On March 31, 1856, Schick was installed as Conrector (vice-principal) along with Director Professor Biewend at Concordia College in St. Louis. C. F. W. Walther spoke at the ceremony. However in the spring of 1858, Biewend became ill and died on April 10. Schick took up the teaching position vacated by Biewend's death while Subrector Saxon assumed the administrative duties. Later in his life, Schick would be known by his students and colleges as "Rector", in recognition of his leadership after Biewend's death. Schick moved with the college when it was relocated to Fort Wayne, Indiana, due to the turmoil of the Civil War. He began teaching in Fort Wayne on September 9, 1861, and would remain a teacher at the institution until his death in 1915.

=== Legacy ===
Schick Street in Fort Wayne is named in his honor. The street formed the western border of the Concordia College campus and now bisects the campus of Indiana Tech, which purchased the campus when the college closed.

Several of Schick's students achieved significance as scholars, including Ernest G. Sihler, a prominent classicist.
