= Friedrich Pfotenhauer =

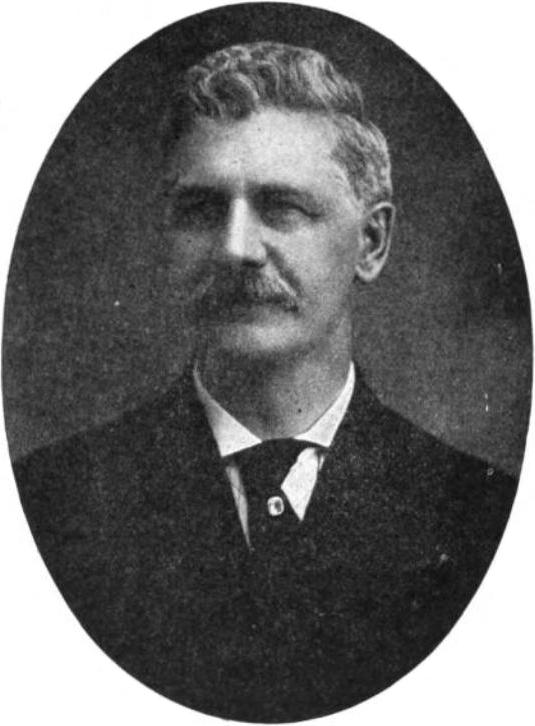
- Born: April 22, 1859; Altencelle, Kingdom of Hanover
- Died: October 9, 1939 (aged 80); Chicago, Illinois
- Education: Concordia Seminary
- Spouse: Helene Brauer
- Church: Lutheran Church–Missouri Synod (LCMS)
- Ordained: November 7, 1880
- Writings: Fuenfzehn Ansprachen; Predigten
- Congregations served: Lewiston, Minnesota (1887–1894); Hamburg, Minnesota (1894–1911)
- Offices held: President, LCMS (1911–1935); 1st vice-president, LCMS (1908–1911; President, LCMS Minnesota & Dakota District (1892-1908)

Friedrich Pfotenhauer (April 22, 1859, Altencelle, Kingdom of Hanover – October 9, 1939, Chicago, Illinois, U.S.) was the fifth president of the Lutheran Church–Missouri Synod, from 1911 to 1935.

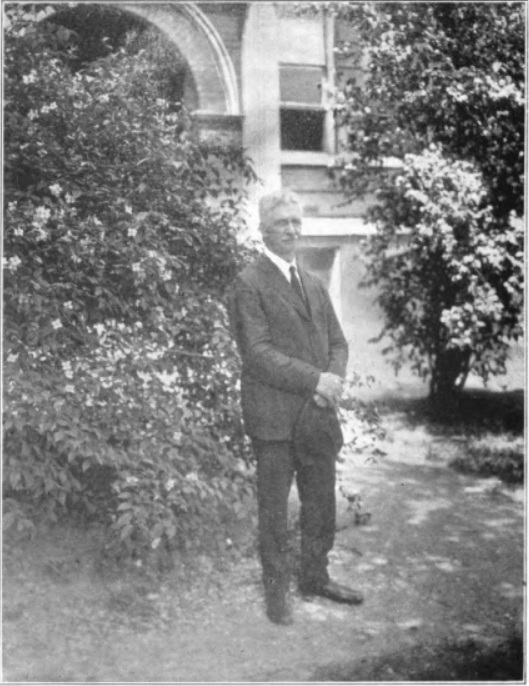
President Pfotenhauer at the LCMS convention in Fort Wayne, Indiana, in 1923

Pfotenhauer emigrated from Germany to the United States in 1875 and attended Concordia College in Fort Wayne, Indiana, and Concordia Seminary in St. Louis, Missouri. Upon his ordination on November 7, 1880, in Odessa, Minnesota, he served as a missionary in Minnesota and the Dakota and Montana territories from 1880 to 1887. On October 10, 1882, he married Helene Brauer in Crete, Illinois.

He was the pastor of congregations in Lewiston, Minnesota (1887–1894), and Hamburg, Minnesota(1894–1911). He also served as the president of the Minnesota and Dakota District of the LCMS from 1891 to 1908).

In 1908, he was elected to a three-year term as first vice-president of the LCMS. He was then elected president of the LCMS in 1911 and held that office until 1935, at which point the LCMS named him honorary president.

Pfotenhauer died on October 9, 1939, in Chicago, Illinois. He and his wife are buried in Bethania Cemetery in Justice, Illinois.

Among his writings are Fuenfzehn Ansprachen (Fifteen Speeches) in 1914 and Predigten (Sermons) in 1938.

Religious titles
Preceded by Franz Pieper	President; Lutheran Church–Missouri Synod; 1911–1935	Succeeded by John W. Behnken
