= John Behnken =

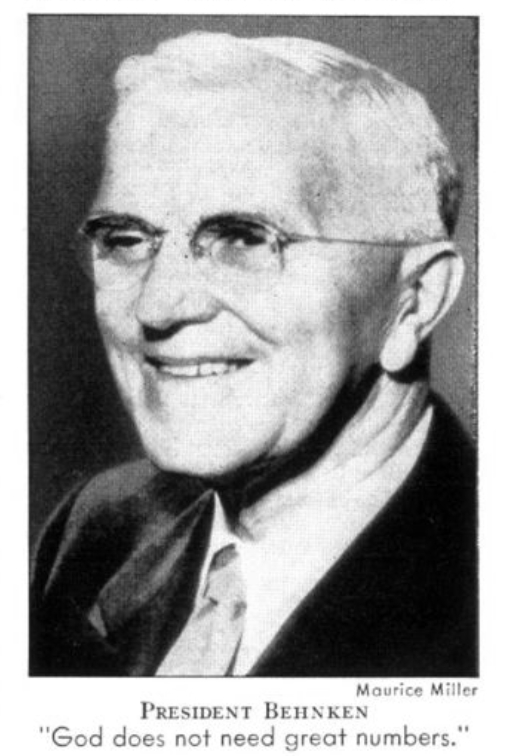
- Picutred in 1953
- Born: March 19, 1884; Cypress, Texas
- Died: February 23, 1968 (aged 83); Hollywood, Florida
- Education: Concordia Seminary
- Spouses: Gertrude Geisler (m. 1909; died 1910) Hilda Grassmuck (m. 1914; died 1954)
- Church: Lutheran Church–Missouri Synod
- Ordained: August 12, 1906
- Offices held: President, LCMS (1935-1962)

John William Behnken (March 19, 1884 – February 23, 1968) was the sixth president of the Lutheran Church–Missouri Synod (LCMS) from 1935 to 1962. He previously served as president of the Synod's Texas District from 1926 to 1929.

Behnken was born on March 19, 1884, in Cypress, Texas, the eldest child of the Rev. George William Behnken and Helen née Wunderlich. George Behnken was a native of Hanover, Germany, immigrating to the United States in 1874. He died when John Behnken was three years old. Following George's death, Helen and her three children moved in with her widowed mother for five years, when she remarried. John Behnken attended Concordia Seminary in St. Louis, Missouri, from 1903 to 1906, and was ordained on August 12, 1906, at Trinity Lutheran Church in Fedor, Texas. He then worked as a missionary in Houston, Texas, and in 1908 became pastor of Trinity Lutheran Church in that city, serving until 1935.

In 1909, he married Gertrude Geisler, who died in 1910. In 1914, he married Hilda Grassmuck, who remained his wife until her death in 1954.

Behnken served as president of the Texas District of the LCMS from 1926 to 1929. He then served a second vice-president of the LCMS from 1929 to 1932 and as first vice-president from 1932 to 1935. He was elected president of the LCMS at its 1935 synodical convention, and was reelected multiple times, serving until 1962, at which time he was named honorary president. During his presidency he worked to establish the Lutheran Council in the United States of America.

Behnken died on February 23, 1968, in Hollywood, Florida. Among the books he authored are God Is Our Refuge and Strength (1942) and his autobiography, This I Recall (1964).

Religious titles
Preceded by F. Pfotenhauer	President; Lutheran Church–Missouri Synod; 1935–1962	Succeeded by Oliver Harms
