= Torger Juve =

American politician

Torger Juve (born October 23, 1840) was a member of the Wisconsin State Assembly.

== Biography ==
Torger O. Juve was born in Christiansands Stift (now Telemark), Norway. He immigrated to the United States with his family during 1852. He first resided at Koshkonong, Wisconsin, until 1857. He graduated from Luther College in 1866 and from Concordia College in 1869 and become a Lutheran clergyman.

== Political career ==
Juve was elected to the Assembly as a Republican legislator from Vernon County, Wisconsin, in 1881 and was re-elected in 1882.
