= Reed Lessing =

Robert Reed Lessing is an American biblical scholar. He was born on March 11th, 1959 and raised in Denver, Colorado. He graduated from St. John's College in Winfield, Kansas, in 1981 and finished graduate work at Concordia Seminary in St. Louis in 1986. He was ordained into the Office of the Holy Ministry on June 29, 1986, at Christ the Servant Lutheran Church, West Monroe, Louisiana. Reed served as the church's pastor until March 1990. From March 1990 to August 1999 he was the pastor of Trinity Lutheran Church, Broken Arrow, Oklahoma.

During the course of his parish work, he received his M.Div., STM, and Ph.D. from Concordia Seminary. In September 1999, he was installed as assistant professor of exegetical theology at Concordia Seminary. In May 2005, he was advanced to the rank of associate professor. In August 2007, he became the director of the seminary's graduate school. In August 2010, he was advanced further to the rank of Professor of Exegetical Theology. In 2013, he returned to parish ministry as senior pastor of St. Michael Lutheran Church in Fort Wayne, Indiana. In July 2020, he joined the faculty of Concordia University, St. Paul.

Reed has taught courses on books in the Old Testament, Hebrew, homiletics, biblical hermeneutics, and preaching. He has published five books and written over 20 articles for religious journals.

== Books ==
- Interpreting Discontinuity: Isaiah’s Tyre Oracle. Eisenbrauns, Winona Lake, IN, 2004. According to WorldCat, the book is held in 130 libraries
- Jonah: Concordia Commentary Series. Concordia Publishing House: St. Louis, 2007.
- Amos: Concordia Commentary Series. Concordia Publishing House: St. Louis, 2009.
- Isaiah 40-55: Concordia Commentary Series. Concordia Publishing House: St. Louis; 2013.
- Isaiah 56-66: Concordia Commentary Series.

== Academic journal articles ==
- “Satire in Isaiah’s Tyre Oracle.” Journal for the Study of the Old Testament 28.1 (2003).
- “Amos and the Earthquake.” Concordia Theological Quarterly, April 2010.
