= Karl L. Barth =

Lutheran minister and seminary president (1924–2020)

- Born: November 7, 1924; Wisconsin
- Died: February 16, 2020 (aged 95)
- Occupations: the eighth president of Concordia Seminary in St. Louis, Missouri

Karl L. Barth (November 7, 1924 – February 16, 2020) was the eighth president of Concordia Seminary in St. Louis, Missouri, from 1982 to 1992.

Barth was born in Wisconsin on November 7, 1924. His father, G. Christian Barth, was a president of Concordia College in Wisconsin and his brother, W.L. Barth, also became a Lutheran minister.

He graduated from Concordia College in Fort Wayne, Indiana, in 1943 and earned a Master of Divinity from Concordia Seminary in St. Louis in 1947. He was awarded an honorary Doctorate of Divinity by Concordia Theological Seminary in 1975.

He served as a pastor in Louisiana, Illinois, and Wisconsin. He was president of the South Wisconsin District of the Lutheran Church–Missouri Synod (LCMS) from 1970 to 1982.

He became president of Concordia Seminary in 1981. He oversaw celebrations of the 150th anniversary of the seminary. In 1986, he predicted that a pastor shortage would become a problem for LCMS churches.

Barth was married and had five children. He died on February 16, 2020, and was buried in Wisconsin Memorial Park in Brookfield, Wisconsin.
