= Seminex =

Lutheran seminary, 1974–1987

Coordinates: 38.639232°N 90.231668°W

Christ Seminary-Seminex
- The Seminex logo, circa 1974, depicting new life springing from a dead trunk. Design by Seminex faculty member Robert Werberig.
- Former name: Concordia Seminary in Exile
- Active: 1974–1987
- Religious affiliation: Association of Evangelical Lutheran Churches
- President: John Tietjen

Seminex is the widely used abbreviation for Concordia Seminary in Exile (later Christ Seminary-Seminex), which existed from 1974 to 1987 after a schism in the Lutheran Church – Missouri Synod (LCMS). The seminary in exile was formed due to the ongoing Fundamentalist–modernist controversy that was dividing Protestant churches in the United States. At issue were foundational disagreements on the authority of Scripture and the role of Christianity. During the 1960s, many clergy and members of the LCMS grew concerned about the direction of education at their flagship seminary, Concordia Seminary, in St. Louis, Missouri. Professors at Concordia Seminary had, in the 1950s and 1960s, begun to utilize the historical-critical method to analyze the Bible rather than the traditional historical-grammatical method that considered scripture to be the inerrant Word of God.

After attempts at compromise failed, on January 20, 1974, the seminary Board of Control chose to suspend the seminary president John Tietjen, leading to a walkout of most faculty and students, and the formation of Seminex. Seminex existed as an institution until its last graduating class of 1983 and was formally dissolved and merged with Lutheran School of Theology at Chicago in 1987. Concordia Seminary quickly rebuilt and by the late 1970s had regained its place as one of the largest Lutheran seminaries in the United States.

The after effects of the controversy were vast. Before the split, the LCMS had both liberal and Evangelical wings. After Seminex, 200 liberal and moderate congregations split from the LCMS to form the Association of Evangelical Lutheran Churches (AELC), leaving the LCMS a more conservative body than it had been in 1969. The AELC itself would later merge with other liberal and moderate Lutheran churches to form the Evangelical Lutheran Church in America (ELCA).

== Background ==
=== Formation of the LCMS ===
In the 1830s, a group of Saxon Germans immigrated to the United States and settled in St. Louis and in Perry County, Missouri. They were fleeing the forced union of German churches by royal fiat. Seizing the opportunity to freely practice their confession, these immigrants, eventually led by C. F. W. Walther, established what would eventually become known as the Lutheran Church – Missouri Synod. Reacting against the rise of theologians such as Albrecht Ritschl and Friedrich Schleiermacher, Walther emphasized the inspiration and authority of the Bible as well as a strict adherence to the Lutheran Confessions.

In addition to a strict adherence to the Lutheran Confessions, Walther also sought to ensure that the new synod was decentralized and congregational. No congregation could be compelled to accept any resolution from a synodical convention or presidential decree that was contrary to the Word of God and the Lutheran Confessions. Each congregation is to be properly taught by a pastor who has been certified for the ministry by one of the official seminaries of the synod. The seminaries themselves are overseen by the synodical president, but he could not take any action against any official of the synod unless empowered by a resolution passed by the synod in convention. This governing structure would be sorely tested in the Seminex crisis.

=== Rise of theological modernism ===
Beginning in the middle of the 19th century in Germany, a group of philosophers at the University of Erlangen and the University of Tübingen began applying a new method of interpretation of Biblical texts. Supernatural elements of the Bible, such as miracles and the Virgin Birth, were dismissed or explained away in natural terms. Historical accounts in the Bible such as the Hittite Empire and the United Monarchy were assumed to be unreliable, and figures such as Abraham, Moses, and Noah were held to be entirely fictional.

Not limited to just the Bible, theological liberalism also sought to change the way that the Lutheran Confessions were understood. The Confessions themselves do not use the term inerrancy with regard to the Scriptures.

The most defensible strategy, it would seem, would be to refrain from using the term "inerrancy" in our presentations. In contexts where we should normally make a statement on this point, we should instead affirm positively that the Sacred Scriptures have the Holy Spirit as their principal Author, that they are the Word of God, and that they are true and dependable. But what if we are explicitly challenged? Then we should first refuse to reply to loaded questions with "yes" or "no."

— Arthur C. Piepkorn, "What Does Inerrancy Mean?", Concordia Theological Monthly (1965)

During the synodical presidency of Franz Pieper, these new theological methods had only limited support within the LCMS. In 1932, Pieper authored the Brief Statement of the Doctrinal Position of the Missouri Synod. In that booklet, Pieper attacked the new theologies, with the statement being circulated widely within the synod. So popular was Pieper's position that well into the 20th century, a majority of LCMS pastors described themselves as Pieperians. Despite Pieper's popularity and resolutions by several synodical conventions endorsing the Brief Statement, theological modernism slowly made inroads in the LCMS.

=== Rise of student activism ===
Concordia Seminary was affected, as were many institutions of higher education in the United States, by the rise of student activism in the late 1960s and early 1970s relating to the Vietnam War and the civil rights movement. On February 10, 1969, about 250 students petitioned the seminary for a three-day moratorium from classes in order to discuss student issues and grievances. One of the main issues was the definition of "full-time" enrollment, which determined whether a student was eligible for deferment from the military draft for the war. Later that year many students wanted to participate in the Moratorium to End the War in Vietnam on October 15.

The killing of four students at Kent State University on May 4, 1970, led to Concordia students holding a vigil for the Kent State victims on May 6. Four crosses were erected in the seminary quadrangle, the bells were tolled, and barbed wire was strung.

During the 1969–70 school year and thereafter, the student newspaper, the Spectrum, urged students to take action to boycott California table grapes, work for social justice, and fight discrimination. The student response to the events leading to the establishment of Seminex borrowed from the previous activism. For example, the crosses erected for the walkout and the tolling of the bells replicated the response to the Kent State killings.

== Early tensions ==
=== Concordia Seminary ===
Under the presidency of Alfred Fuerbringer from 1953 to 1969, Concordia Seminary had developed a reputation as a more liberal institution within the LCMS due to its teaching of historical-critical methods of biblical interpretation. Though the charges were reformulated in several different reports, they generally held that the faculty (and, particularly, members of the exegetical theology department) were using historical-critical methods for biblical interpretation, and that these professors improperly stressed the importance of the doctrine or teaching of the Gospel (forgiveness of sins in Christ) over the importance of the whole of the Christian Bible. The September 1, 1972, Report of the Synodical President states:

While the issues are many and complex, the St. Louis Seminary faculty and the synodical President at a meeting on May 17, 1972, agreed that the basic issue is the relationship between the Scriptures and the Gospel. To put the matter in other words, the question is whether the Scriptures are the norm of our faith and life or whether the Gospel alone is that norm?

— J. A. O. Preus, Report of the Synodical President of The Lutheran Church–Missouri Synod, I. Preface, as found in the Appendix of A Seminary in Crisis: The Inside Story of the Preus Fact Finding Committee by Paul A. Zimmerman

Sensing that the LCMS was changing its theological position, two other conservative Lutheran church bodies, the Evangelical Lutheran Synod and the Wisconsin Synod, who had been in altar and pulpit fellowship with the LCMS for a century, suspended that fellowship with the LCMS in 1955 and 1961, respectively, and withdrew from the Evangelical Lutheran Synodical Conference in 1963, a body the synods had co-founded in 1872.

Beginning in 1959 and continuing through 1973, the laity in the LCMS reacted to the growing modernism at Concordia Seminary by passing a series of seventeen resolutions either affirming full biblical inerrancy or condemning the spread of "antiscriptural teaching" in the synod. Fuerbringer ignored these resolutions as well as the growing discontent in the synod. Many conservatives in the LCMS asked whether the seminary was serving the denomination or the denomination was serving the seminary.

=== Ascension of John Tietjen ===
At the end of 1968, Fuerbringer announced his retirement as president of Concordia Seminary, triggering the selection process for his replacement. Presidents of the LCMS seminaries at that time were elected by a vote of the following four entities, with each entity having one vote: the president of the LCMS, the president of the LCMS district in which the institution was located (in this case, the Missouri District), the seminary's Board of Control, and the LCMS Board of Higher Education. At the time, these positions were all under the control of either supporters of the ecumenical movement or theological modernists.

Among this group, there was increasing concern that the incumbent synodical president, Oliver Harms, was going to lose his reelection bid. Harms was a key supporter of the Lutheran Council in the United States of America (LCUSA) and other inter-Lutheran cooperation, and the modernist faction was concerned that confessional insurgents would disrupt the process of selection for presidency of Concordia Seminary; hindering the greater goal of Lutheran unity. In addition, members of the seminary's Board of Control would be elected at the convention. There was great urgency to complete the process of selecting a new seminary president before the upcoming synod convention would intervene. While the procedure for actually electing the seminary president was normal, the timing was unusual in that it was the first time a new president of the seminary would be elected before the actual retirement of his predecessor.

In May 1969, John Tietjen was selected president of Concordia Seminary after sixteen years as a minister in New Jersey and three years heading the public relations division of LCUSA. Although a virtual unknown among the broader synod, Tietjen was well known in the ecumenical movement. The selection of Tietjen caused great excitement among the faculty of Concordia Seminary and in wider Lutheran circles. In the words of the wife of Ed Schroeder (then a professor at the seminary), "Tietjen is the one we wanted".

=== Election of Jacob Preus ===
Two months later, Jacob Preus—then the president of the other LCMS seminary, Concordia Theological Seminary in Springfield, Illinois—was elected president of the synod in an upset over the incumbent Harms. Preus's 1969 campaign for the LCMS presidency was supported by conservatives within the church body who opposed moves by Harms to institute altar and pulpit fellowship with the American Lutheran Church (ALC), which did not hold the Bible as infallible and inerrant. Preus's supporters wanted to see the LCMS, and especially its colleges and seminaries, adopt more uniform orthodox and confessional theological stances.

Within a year of assuming office, Preus established a Fact Finding Committee to examine the teachings of the seminary's faculty. The committee presented this complete report to Preus on June 15, 1971. Two weeks later, Preus sent the entire report to the seminary Board of Control and seminary president Tietjen.

That report, called "The Blue Book" due to its cover, was later mailed to all congregations and pastors of the LCMS in September 1972. The main bulk of the report consisted of a large number of quotations from the transcripts of the interviews with the seminary faculty members, whose anonymity was protected. The Blue Book had a powerful effect in the LCMS. Based upon the committee's findings, the seminary's board of control was instructed "to take appropriate action on the basis of the report, commending or correcting where necessary ... That the Board of Control report progress directly to the President of Synod and the Board for Higher Education".

The seminary's board of control however had a 6-5 majority in favor of Tietjen and the faculty, and in February 1973 by a 6–5 vote, the board commended each member as faithful to Scripture and the Lutheran confessions. But the 1973 LCMS convention in New Orleans condemned the seminary's faculty in a resolution that charged them with "abolish[ing] the formal principle, sola Scriptura (i.e. that all doctrines are derived from the Scripture and the Scripture is the sole norm of all doctrine)". A new, more conservative seminary board of control was also elected at that convention, and the new board quickly proceeded to suspend Tietjen from the presidency of Concordia Seminary in August 1973. The suspension was initially delayed and then "vacated" while various groups in the LCMS attempted to find a route toward reconciliation, but Tietjen was again suspended on January 20 of the following year.

== Synod in schism ==
=== Formation of Seminex ===
The day after Tietjen's second suspension, some of the seminary's students and faculty registered their protest. A group of students organized a moratorium on classes (which had been planned in the fall but was delayed because of the death of Arthur Carl Piepkorn, the graduate professor of systematic theology on December 13, 1973, causing the Board of Control to cancel its December 19 board meeting).

A large majority of the seminary's students voted on the morning of February 19, 1974, to continue their education under the targeted faculty at an off-campus site. Immediately after the students passed their resolution, they and the majority of the faculty staged a dramatic walkout, inviting the local press for the event. Singing "The Church's One Foundation", they processed out of the seminary grounds, where students had planted white crosses bearing their names. The event attracted a great deal of media attention. However, the seminary's Board of Control subsequently accused the students of disingenuous posturing, noting that the students had returned to the seminary cafeteria for lunch immediately after their supposed departure and continued to live in student housing for the remainder of the term.

The next day, classes officially began at Concordia Seminary in Exile (Seminex) in facilities provided by Eden Seminary and Saint Louis University. Since Seminex was not yet an accredited school, an arrangement was made with the Lutheran School of Theology at Chicago (LSTC) whereby the first class of Seminex graduates would officially receive their diplomas from LSTC. The first graduation was held in the neo-Gothic quadrangle of Washington University in St. Louis. John Tietjen, who in October 1974 was finally removed as president of Concordia Seminary, was elected president of Seminex in February 1975.

Within a year and a half of its inception, Seminex had acquired its own facilities at 607 North Grand Boulevard and then, following water damage to that building, at 539 North Grand. The institution also immediately received provisional accreditation through the Association of Theological Schools. No longer acknowledging the legitimacy of Concordia Seminary and its new administration led by Martin Scharlemann, Seminex faculty and students referred to that institution simply as "801", after its address at 801 DeMun Avenue. However, facing legal action from Concordia, the exiled seminary eventually changed its official name from "Concordia Seminary in Exile" to "Christ Seminary-Seminex" in October 1977.

=== Widening rift ===
In the wake of conservative advancements at the 1973 LCMS convention, opponents had convened a conference in Chicago to chart out strategies. The conference's 800 delegates promised moral and financial support for church members who faced pressure due to their opposition to the actions of the LCMS convention. They also formed a new organization, Evangelical Lutherans in Mission (ELIM), to serve as a network and rallying point for the liberal wing of the LCMS. ELIM provided financial support to Seminex, along with public-relations assistance via its twice-monthly newspaper, Missouri in Perspective.

In an attempt to increase support for their cause, Seminex students barnstormed the nation as part of "Operation Outreach", meeting with LCMS congregations to explain their perspective of what happening in the rapidly evolving situation in St. Louis. Tietjen and the other Seminex faculty also contacted various congregations of the LCMS to enlist their support. Tietjen fully expected that a minimum of 1200 congregations of the synod would leave when asked.

As part of the process of ordination in the LCMS, a prospective pastor must be certified for ministry, and per the LCMS constitution, only an official seminary of the synod could issue those certifications. In 1974, there were two institutions in Saint Louis claiming to be the official seminary, with both of them issuing certifications for the ministry. The expectation of Seminex backers was that if they could place enough of their graduates into pastoral positions, the overall synod would be forced to recognize Seminex as an official seminary of the LCMS. Privately, more than half of the district presidents gave their support to the Seminex faction and indicated that they would place graduates of Seminex as vicars and pastors, giving Seminex good reason for hope that they would eventually prevail. Beginning in 1974, presidents of eight of the 35 LCMS districts (equivalent of a diocese) began placing graduates of Seminex as pastors in violation of the LCMS bylaws and constitution. In response, the 1975 LCMS convention passed a resolution demanding that those districts cease placing Seminex graduates and granting the synodical president the power to remove a district president if the latter refused. Four of the district presidents subsequently ceased, while four defied the convention's resolutions. By 1976, the four dissident district presidents had been removed from office and they subsequently resigned from the synod.

After the expulsion, a movement to leave the synod took shape among dissident congregations and church officials, most of them members of ELIM or congregations that had ordained a Seminex graduate. The largest number of departures came from the LCMS' non-geographical English District. In the end, more than 200 congregations left the LCMS, a small fraction of what Tietjen had expected.

=== Separation of the AELC ===
In December 1976, the departing congregations formed a new independent church body, the Association of Evangelical Lutheran Churches (AELC). The AELC proved to be a more socially and theologically liberal church than the LCMS, and shortly after its inception, it departed from LCMS practice on ordination by opening the ministry to women. Furthermore, the new body immediately declared full communion with the ALC and the Lutheran Church in America (LCA), and declared its intent to join the National Council of Churches and the Lutheran World Federation. To ministers and parishioners who remained with the LCMS, this and other moves by the fledgling AELC validated earlier concerns about the faculty majority at Concordia Seminary.

With congregations totaling about 100,000 members, the AELC represented less than 4 percent of the 2.7 million members of the LCMS. In consequence, the break-away organization could not provide nearly enough pastoral positions for all the graduates of Seminex, whose enrollment began to sharply decline.

=== End of Seminex ===
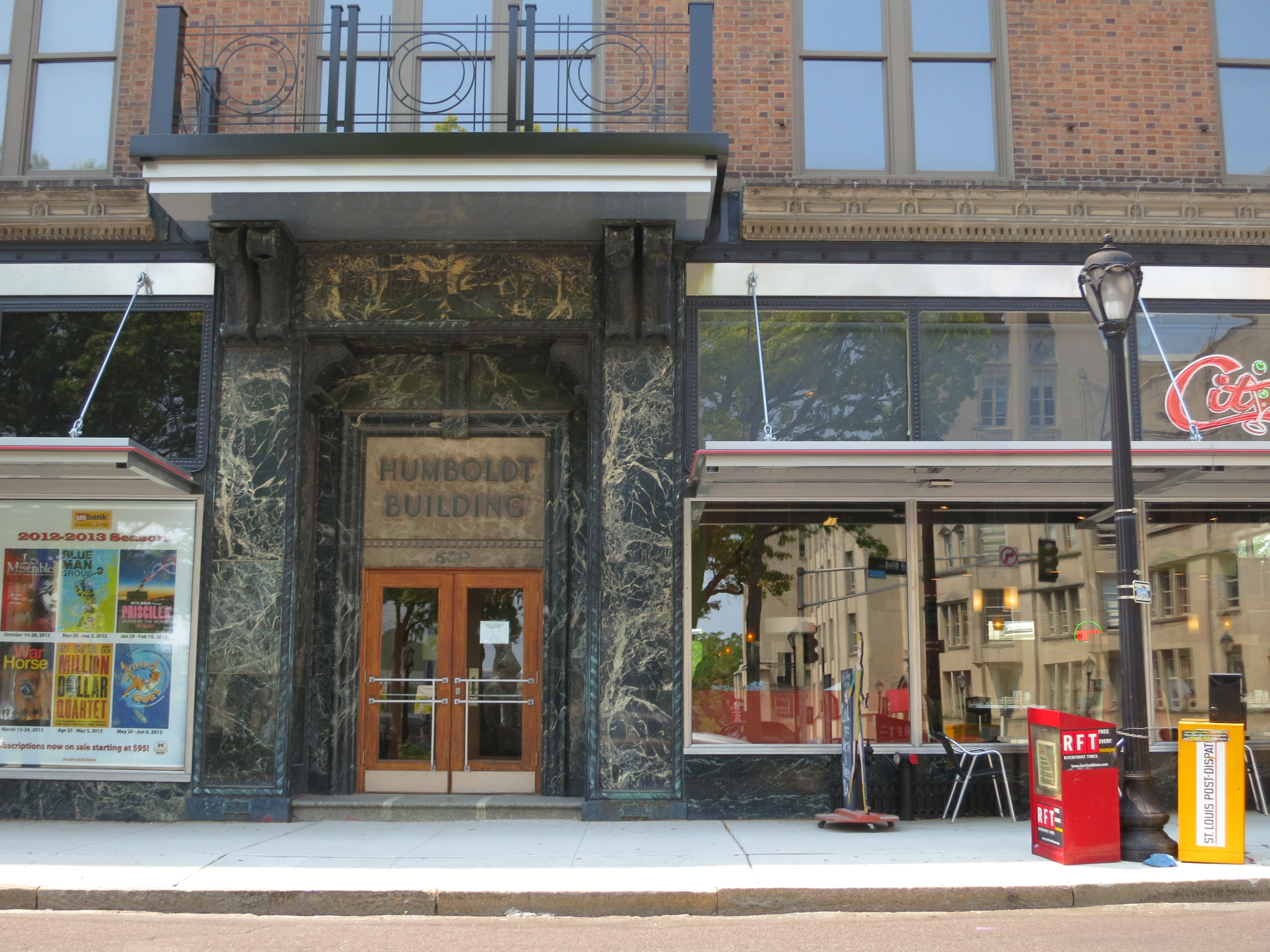
Seminex moved to the Humboldt Building at 539 N Grand Blvd in 2012 in 1982.

Starting in 1974, the LCMS made clear to prospective students that there was no chance of ordination in the synod unless course credits were obtained in official LCMS seminaries. The synod also barred Seminex recruiters from the Concordia University System. In 1975, the LCMS convention voted to close Concordia Senior College in Fort Wayne, Indiana, which had allegedly served as a pipeline for students into Seminex.

Due primarily to its difficulties placing graduates in ministerial positions, Seminex enrollment sharply declined over the next decade. By the end of the 1970s, any hope that a large number of LCMS congregations would leave had been extinguished, forcing Tietjen, who was now president of Seminex, to begin laying off faculty. In addition, the seminary was torn between positioning itself solely as the seminary for the AELC, which would have made it difficult to continue to solicit donations from supporters in the LCMS who had remained in that synod, and reshaping itself as a "pan-Lutheran" seminary that would serve many different Lutheran church bodies. By the beginning of the 1980s, it was clear that there was no possibility of seminary's continued existence as a stand-alone institution.

In anticipation of the merger that formed the ELCA in 1988, Seminex dispersed its faculty and students to several seminaries of the ALC and the LCA around the country, including the Lutheran School of Theology at Chicago (LSTC), Wartburg Theological Seminary, and Pacific Lutheran Theological Seminary. The last St. Louis commencement was held in May 1983, although Seminex continued to exist as an educational institution on the LSTC campus in Chicago through the end of 1987. Several professorial chairs at LSTC were subsequently named after Christ Seminary-Seminex.

== Legacy ==
After their separation, the AELC catalyzed the formation of the Evangelical Lutheran Church in America. Many pastors and graduates of Seminex became prominent bishops and leaders in the ELCA; for example, in 2009, three of eight seminary presidents were Seminex graduates, as were a number of bishops. Decades later, theologian Carl Braaten wrote that the transfer of so many modernist professors to future seminaries of the ELCA permanently altered the DNA of those institutions, resulting in what he perceived as the root cause of the slow progressive slide of the ELCA. Theologian Robert Benne concurred, writing in First Things;

Whatever the case, from the beginnings of the ELCA that leadership of former Missourians has been instrumental in pushing the ELCA in the revisionist direction. They and the others who created the new church did all they needed to do to insure that liberal Protestantism was the ELCA's destination.

— Robert Benne, "The Trials of American Lutheranism", First Things (May 2011)

Because Seminex and the related departures of the AELC congregations removed many liberals from the LCMS, the controversy left the synod considerably more conservative by the mid-1970s than it had been a decade earlier. This allowed the LCMS to begin the slow and painful process of rebuilding its confessional heritage. In 1977, the synod's convention voted to severely restrict its involvement in LCUSA, a body the synod had been instrumental in founding in 1966, in effect declaring that the synod would not participate in any further merger discussions. In 1981, the synod's convention ended the fellowship agreement with the American Lutheran Church that had been reached in 1969. However the LCMS emerged from the crisis bitterly divided.

The 1977 LCMS convention also abruptly withdrew from the joint hymnal project with the LCA and ALC. Thus the Lutheran Book of Worship was published in 1978 without the participation of the very denomination that had initiated its production, angering leaders in the other church bodies. Congregations of the LCMS objected to the use of the 1977 revision of the Book of Common Prayer in the hymnal and the hymnal's use of the Revised Standard Version as well as many other concerns. The hymnal committee of the LCMS attempted to address these concerns as well as remove much of the objectionable content and published a recension of the objected hymnal in 1982, Lutheran Worship. However a high level of mistrust in the LCMS between its congregations and denominational leadership meant that the new hymnal was poorly received. A study commissioned by the LCMS in 1999 found that 36% of congregations used the older hymnal, with the rest using some combination of both and only a few exclusively using the "newer" hymnal published 17 years prior to the study. Thus the synod entered the 21st century lacking unity even in its own hymnal.

Concordia Seminary was widely pronounced as dead in the spring of 1974. The stress and turmoil generated by the controversy wrought an enormous toll on all participants, Martin Scharlemann, who had been appointed to replace Tietjen, resigned from the presidency of Concordia Seminary a mere three months into his term due to mental and physical exhaustion. Seminex sympathizers such as Martin Marty stated that the LCMS would be forced to close the school and sell the campus. However, under the leadership of Ralph Bohlmann, who had succeeded Scharlemann as president, enrollment quickly rebounded.

Year	Enrollment
Fall 1974	194
1975–76	284
1976–77	354
1977–78	432
1978–79	561
1979–80	664
1980–81	724

At Concordia Seminary's fall convocation in 1974, Francis Schaeffer addressed those of the student body who had not walked out. Schaeffer commended the synod for its faithful stance and noted that this was the first time in history that a church body had resisted the influx of modernism and retained its confessional heritage. The success of the confessional insurgents in the LCMS later inspired a similar group within the Southern Baptist Convention and provided a template for the ultimately successful Southern Baptist conservative resurgence of the 1980s.
