= Hamburg, Minnesota =

City in Minnesota, United States

Hamburg
- City
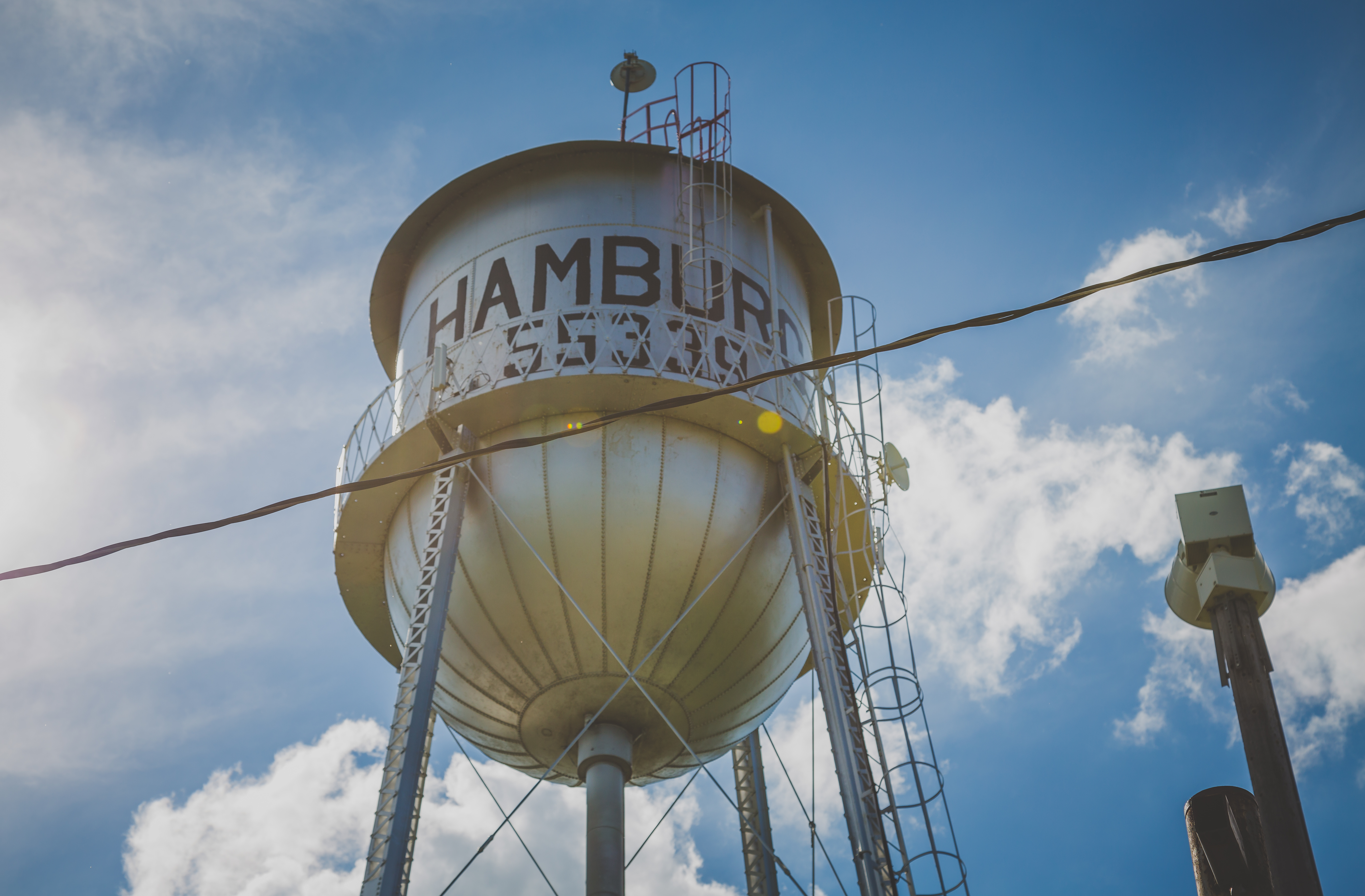
- Hamburg water tower

- Location of the city of Hamburg within Carver County, Minnesota
- Coordinates: 44°43′58″N 93°57′52″W
- Country: United States
- State: Minnesota
- County: Carver

Area
  - Total: 0.20 sq mi (0.53 km^{2})
  - Land: 0.20 sq mi (0.53 km^{2})
  - Water: 0 sq mi (0.00 km^{2})
- Elevation: 1,001 ft (305 m)

Population (2020)
  - Total: 566
  - Density: 2,778.0/sq mi (1,072.61/km^{2})
- Time zone: UTC-6 (Central (CST))
  - Summer (DST): UTC-5 (CDT)
- ZIP code: 55339
- Area code: 952
- FIPS code: 27-26666
- GNIS feature ID: 2394274
- Website: www.cityofhamburgmn.com

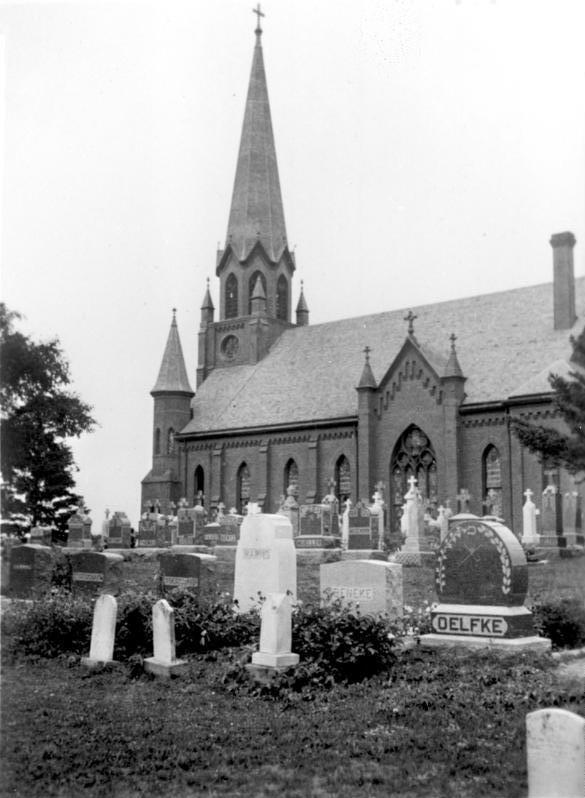
Church in Hamburg, 1928.

Hamburg is a city in Carver County, Minnesota, United States. As of the 2020 census, Hamburg had a population of 566.

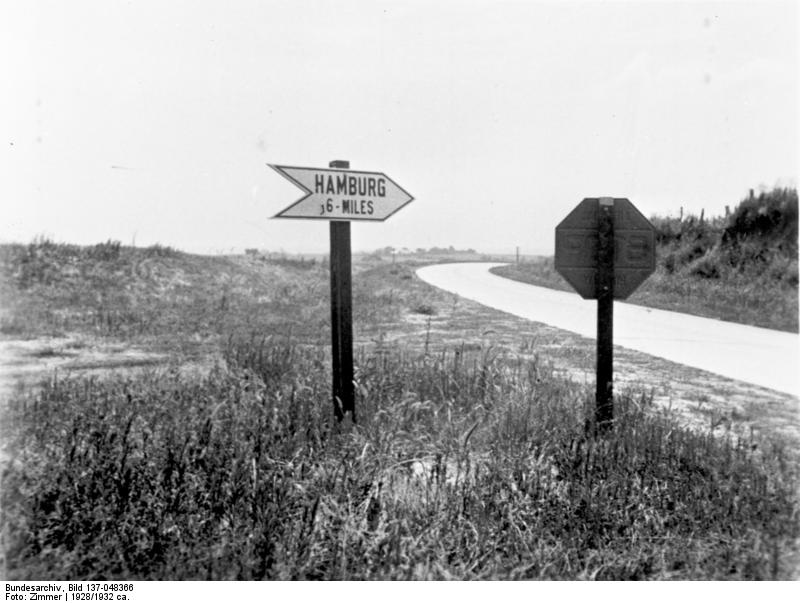
Road sign to Hamburg, 1928.

== History ==
A post office has been in operation in Hamburg since 1881. The city was named after Hamburg, in Germany.

== Geography ==
According to the United States Census Bureau, the city has a total area of 0.23 square miles (0.60 km^{2}), all land.

County Road 50 serves as a main route in Hamburg. Minnesota State Highways 5 and 25 pass in proximity to the city.

== Demographics ==
Historical population
| Census | Pop. | Note | %± |
|---|---|---|---|
| 1900 | 136 | | — |
| 1910 | 153 | | 12.5% |
| 1920 | 153 | | 0.0% |
| 1930 | 195 | | 27.5% |
| 1940 | 198 | | 1.5% |
| 1950 | 184 | | −7.1% |
| 1960 | 288 | | 56.5% |
| 1970 | 405 | | 40.6% |
| 1980 | 475 | | 17.3% |
| 1990 | 492 | | 3.6% |
| 2000 | 538 | | 9.3% |
| 2010 | 513 | | −4.6% |
| 2020 | 566 | | 10.3% |
U.S. Decennial Census

=== 2010 census ===
As of the census of 2010, there were 513 people, 201 households, and 134 families residing in the city. The population density was 2,230.4 inhabitants per square mile (861.2/km^{2}). There were 222 housing units at an average density of 965.2 per square mile (372.7/km^{2}). The racial makeup of the city was 94.9% White, 0.2% Native American, 0.2% Asian, 0.2% Pacific Islander, and 4.5% from other races. Hispanic or Latino of any race were 7.0% of the population.

There were 201 households, of which 31.3% had children under the age of 18 living with them, 56.2% were married couples living together, 6.0% had a female householder with no husband present, 4.5% had a male householder with no wife present, and 33.3% were non-families. 24.4% of all households were made up of individuals, and 9% had someone living alone who was 65 years of age or older. The average household size was 2.55 and the average family size was 3.09.

The median age in the city was 38.3 years. 24% of residents were under the age of 18; 8.3% were between the ages of 18 and 24; 28.1% were from 25 to 44; 26.1% were from 45 to 64; and 13.5% were 65 years of age or older. The gender makeup of the city was 52.2% male and 47.8% female.

=== 2000 census ===
As of the census of 2000, there were 538 people, 206 households, and 159 families residing in the city. The population density was 2,697.0 inhabitants per square mile (1,041.3/km^{2}). There were 209 housing units at an average density of 1,047.7 per square mile (404.5/km^{2}). The racial makeup of the city was 98.51% White, 0.19% African American, 0.19% Native American, 0.19% Pacific Islander, 0.74% from other races, and 0.19% from two or more races. Hispanic or Latino of any race were 2.42% of the population.

There were 206 households, out of which 35.0% had children under the age of 18 living with them, 66.5% were married couples living together, 7.8% had a female householder with no husband present, and 22.8% were non-families. 19.9% of all households were made up of individuals, and 9.2% had someone living alone who was 65 years of age or older. The average household size was 2.61 and the average family size was 2.99.

In the city, the population was spread out, with 24.9% under the age of 18, 8.2% from 18 to 24, 29.0% from 25 to 44, 22.5% from 45 to 64, and 15.4% who were 65 years of age or older. The median age was 37 years. For every 100 females, there were 100.0 males. For every 100 females age 18 and over, there were 102.0 males.

The median income for a household in the city was $47,578, and the median income for a family was $50,673. Males had a median income of $37,250 versus $28,542 for females. The per capita income for the city was $21,221. About 4.8% of families and 5.6% of the population were below the poverty line, including 3.5% of those under age 18 and 15.6% of those age 65 or over.

== Politics ==
Presidential election results

Presidential elections results
| Year | Republican | Democratic | Third parties |
|---|---|---|---|
| 2020 | 77.2% 250 | 20.1% 65 | 2.7% 9 |
| 2016 | 76.0% 231 | 17.7% 54 | 6.3% 19 |
| 2012 | 67.2% 195 | 31.7% 92 | 1.1% 3 |
| 2008 | 68.8% 190 | 29.4% 81 | 1.8% 5 |
| 2004 | 70.0% 196 | 28.2% 79 | 1.8% 5 |
| 2000 | 69.9% 197 | 24.5% 69 | 5.6% 16 |

== Notable residents ==
- Friedrich Pfotenhauer, president of Lutheran Church–Missouri Synod
- Buck Zumhofe, professional wrestler
