= Norbert O. Schedler Honors College =

- Established: 1982
- Affiliations: University of Central Arkansas
- Dean: Patricia Smith
- Students: 500
- Location: Conway, Arkansas, US; 35.078°N 92.455°W
- Website: Schedler Honors College

The Norbert O. Schedler Honors College is an interdisciplinary program at the University of Central Arkansas. One of the first Honors Colleges (in contrast to numerous honors programs) in the country, the Schedler Honors College leads to the receipt of a minor in Interdisciplinary Studies. Successful completion of the minor requires a senior thesis or a supplemental senior project such as a performance, exhibit, or other creative work.

== History ==
The college was founded in 1982 by professor of philosophy Dr. Norbert Schedler and was one of the first Honors Colleges in the United States. The first class in the spring of 1982 was composed of 60 students with an average ACT score of 26.8 and a very tight budget.

== Graduation requirements ==
The Interdisciplinary Studies Minor is satisfied by the completion of a two-tiered system of courses. The first tier of Honors courses makes up the Honors Program. These four courses are considered the core classes and the credit from these classes is applied to the students' general education requirements.

The typical sequence of class in the first tier is

- Honors Core I
- Honors Core II
- Honors Core III
- Honors Core IV

During a student's sophomore year, the student must complete a sophomore lecture on a subject of their choice and meet certain GPA requirements in order to continue into the Honors college, the second tier of Honors course work. The 15 credit hours in the second tier satisfy the requirements for an Interdisciplinary Studies Minor. In satisfying the minor requirements, students develop their own curriculum by selecting from a variety of course offerings.

For completion of the minor the minimum the student must complete:

- 2 Junior Seminars
- 1 Senior Seminar
- 1 Oxford Tutorial
- 1 Honors Thesis

Upper level seminar courses are offered in subjects such as religion, gender studies, constitutional law, ecology, storytelling, the history of science and technology, and social movements.

== Co-curricular activities ==
The Schedler Honors College offers a number of activities that supplement their standard course load they call these co-curricular events. These include Hightables, a series of lectures given by visiting academics; Soapboxes, a series of discussion groups led by Honors students or faculty; a weekly meditation group; and a Foreign Film Series. These events are usually an hour to two hours in length and happen regularly throughout the semester.

The Schedler Honors College also hosts two special events on a bi-annual basis. The first of these is called Issues in the Public Square. It is a weeklong series of lectures and discussion groups concentrating on a single theme. Events are led by students, faculty, and visiting academics. The second of these special events is called Challenge Week; this event falls on alternating years from Issues in the Public Square. Historically Challenge Week was a weeklong event but in recent years it has been expanded to two weeks to accommodate the increased number of speakers that are invited. Each Challenge Week concentrates on a theme, recent topics include ecology, intelligent design, and the cultural conflict in America. A number of guest speakers are invited for each Challenge Week, these lecturers are expert in their field and are the core of the events schedule. Hightables, Soapboxes, and roundtable discussions on related topics supplement these speakers. Past guest lecturers have included George McGovern, Ralph Nader, Ann Coulter, Michael Moore, Manning Marable, Neil Gaiman, Chuck Klosterman and Robert F. Kennedy Jr.

== Sources ==
- Schedler, N. (1987). "The Lively Experiment". University of Central Arkansas.
- Schedler, N. (1987). "The Challenge". University of Central Arkansas.
- Bryant, Jimmy (2008), The Centennial History of the University of Central Arkansas, Virginia Beach, VA: Donning Co. Publishers, ISBN 978-1-57864-517-6
