= Concordia College (Indiana) =

Former educational institution in Indiana, US

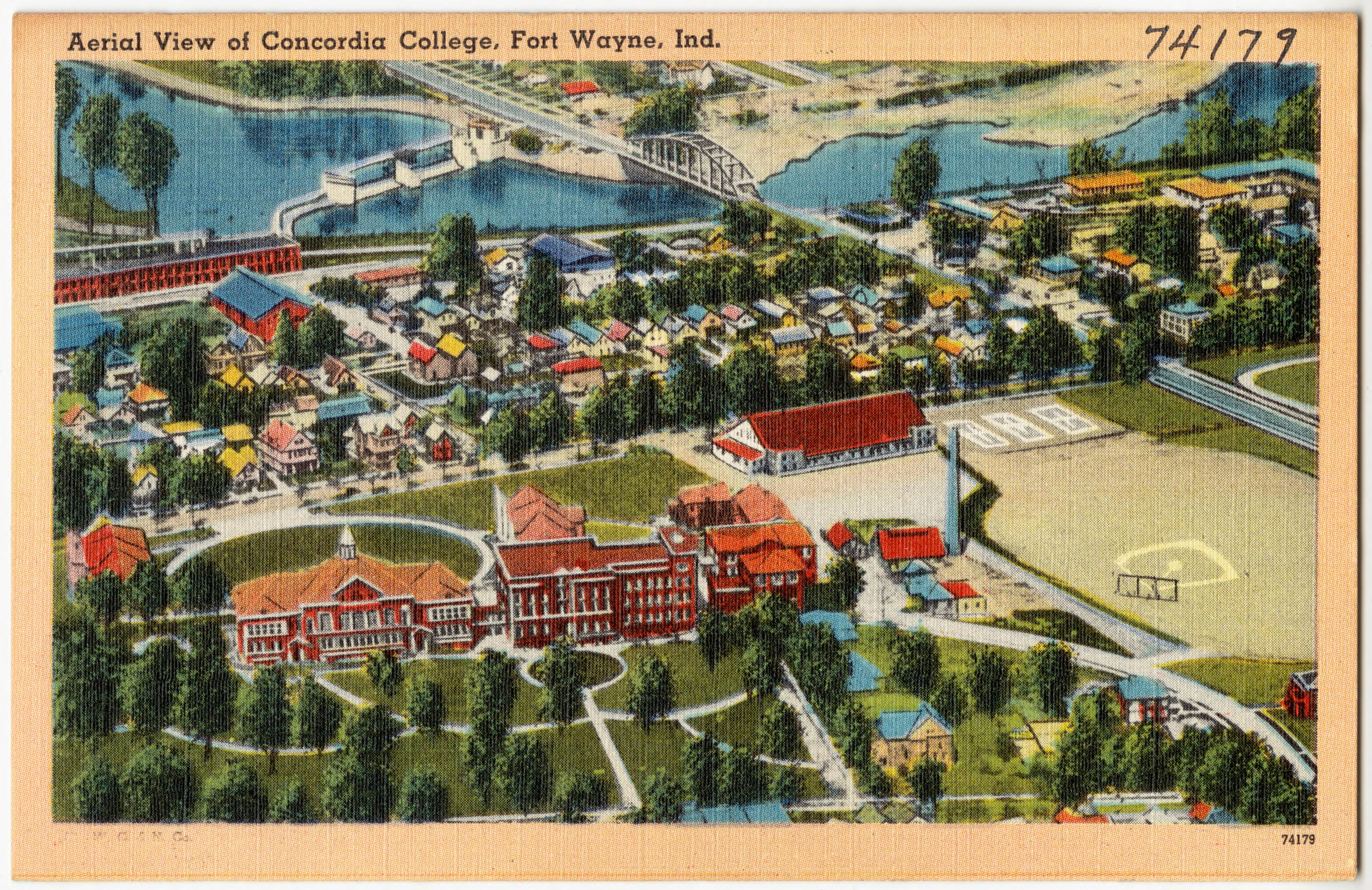
- Aerial view of Concordia College (between circa 1930 and circa 1945)
- Type: Private high school and junior college
- Active: 1839–1957
- Religious affiliation: Lutheran Church–Missouri Synod
- Location: Fort Wayne, Indiana, United States; 41°4′39.96″N 85°7′1.84″W

Concordia College was an educational institution of the Lutheran Church–Missouri Synod (LCMS) whose main purpose was to prepare men to enter one of the synod's seminaries. It was founded as a German-style gymnasium (i.e., a combined high school and junior college) in Perry County, Missouri, in 1839. It was moved to St. Louis, Missouri, in 1847, and ultimately to Fort Wayne, Indiana, in 1861. In 1935, the high school department of the school was separated from the junior college to form Concordia Lutheran High School. Concordia College was closed in 1957 when the LCMS opened Concordia Senior College on a new campus in Fort Wayne..The former campus was purchased by the Indiana Institute of Technology.

== History ==
=== Beginnings in Perry County, Missouri ===
In 1839, a group of Lutherans immigrated from Saxony, Germany in order to more freely practice their religion and settled in Perry County and in St. Louis, Missouri. That summer, three candidates for the ministry who had not yet been assigned to a congregation, Johann F. Buenger, Ottomar Fuerbringer, and Theodor Brohm, began construction of a 1 1/2-story 16-by-21-foot (4.9 by 6.4 m) log cabin in the Dresden settlement just south of Altenburg. Buenger was the lead proponent for the project. Those three men along with C. F. W. Walther, the pastor of the Dresden congregation, were the owners, faculty, and administrators of the school. Given the extreme poverty in which the newly arrived settlers found themselves, it was difficult to raise financial and other support for the project.

On August 13, 1839, an advertisement in the Anzeiger des Westens, the principal German language newspaper in St. Louis, announced the establishment a German gymnasium in Perry County, with a scheduled opening date of October 1, 1839. However, the school did not actually open until December 9, 1839, due to lack of equipment and funds. The initial enrollment included four girls (ages 5 to 12) and seven boys (ages 7 to 15). The purpose of the school, as shown by the composition of the student body, was to provide a classical education to all children in the settlement.

By May 1841, Buenger and Fuerbringer had left the settlement to serve as pastors elsewhere, and Brohm and Walther were unable to teach full time due to illness. Later that year, the school was moved to a 20-by-17-foot (6.1 by 5.2 m) log cabin in Altenburg; that cabin is listed on the National Register of Historic Places as the Concordia Log Cabin College. When Brohm accepted a pastorate in New York in May 1843, Gotthold H. Loeber, the pastor of Trinity Lutheran Church in Altenburg, became the head of the school.

In 1843, Trinity congregation in St. Louis, where Walther was now pastor, began supplying seven dollars per month in financial support, while the Perry County settlers provided a teacher residence, food, and other supplies. Under Loeber, the focus of the school changed to that of preparing pastors and teachers, with seminary training being added to the gymnasium curriculum.

During the school's existence in Perry County, it was known variously as Luther College and the Altenberg Seminary. It may have also been known as Concordia College, but there is no conclusive evidence that it was known there by that name.

=== Relocation to St. Louis ===
When the LCMS was founded in 1847, one of its main purposes was to provide training for pastors and teachers to serve the congregations. It was decided that it would be better for the synod to acquire the existing school in Altenburg rather than to establish a new one. After negotiations involving the synod and the congregations in both Perry County and St. Louis, it was agreed that the urban setting of St. Louis would provide a better location. In December 1849, the college and seminary, with nine students and one teacher, relocated to temporary quarters in that city, with the LCMS assuming ownership in October 1850. A new two-story 42-by-43-foot (13 by 13 m) building housing both the preparatory school and the seminary opened on a 2-acre (0.81 ha) campus on South Jefferson Avenue in 1850. That same year, the gymnasium and the seminary began to be treated as separate institutions, and Adolf F. T. Biewend (né Adolph Friedrich Theodor; 1816–1858) was appointed as head of the gymnasium in 1852.

By the mid-1850s, the course of study consisted of six years in the preparatory school and three years in the seminary. The preparatory school was structured as a German gymnasium, with six grades (Sexta, Quinta, Quarta, Tertia, Secunda, and Prima) corresponding to approximately four years of high school and two years of junior college in today's terminology. One difference from the typical German gymnasium was that it was a boarding school. On February 23, 1853, the Missouri General Assembly granted a charter to the combined institution under the name "Concordia College", the charter and legal name under which the now separate Concordia Seminary continues to operate

=== Relocation to Fort Wayne ===
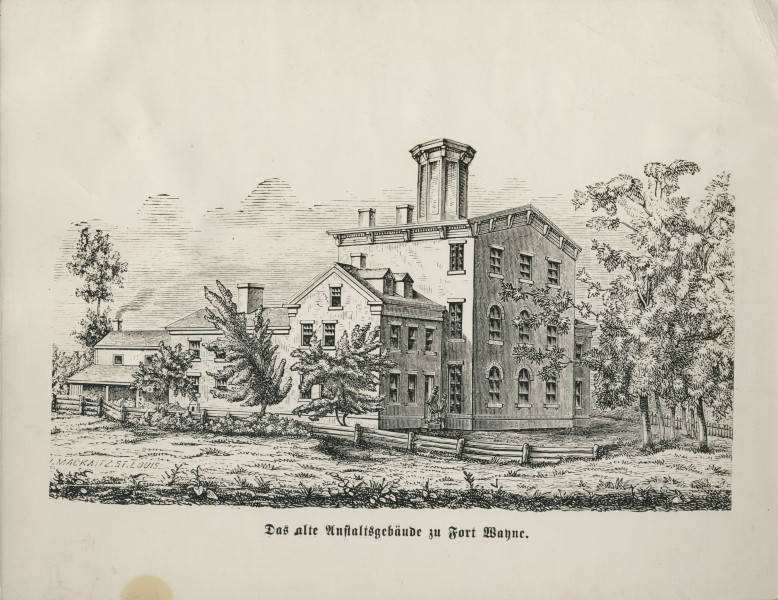
The main seminary building in 1857 used by the college after it relocated to Fort Wayne in 1861

By 1860, the number of students in the preparatory school and seminary had increased, leading to overcrowding on the St. Louis campus. Already in the 1850s, proposals had been made to move the synod's practical seminary (today's Concordia Theological Seminary) from Fort Wayne to St. Louis to share quarters with Concordia Seminary, with the preparatory school taking over the practical seminary's campus in Fort Wayne. The practical seminary had fewer students than the preparatory school, so no additional facilities would be needed in St. Louis, and, while additional construction would be needed in Fort Wayne, building costs were lower there. The 1860 convention of the LCMS voted to proceed with that plan. The outbreak of the Civil War in 1861 caused the relocation to proceed more quickly than originally planned. Three professors, an assistant, and the 78 students (all male) of Concordia College moved to Fort Wayne in the summer of 1861, and classes began in September. However, inadequate housing due to the quickness of the move and a typhoid outbreak among both faculty and students made living conditions miserable.

The 15 1/2-acre (6.3 ha) campus inherited from the practical seminary contained two houses and the Seminary Building. The latter had cost $7,000 to construct and had been dedicated on October 25, 1857. The Seminary Building also housed the synod's teachers' college which had been relocated from Milwaukee, Wisconsin, in that same year, but that school was soon moved off campus to relieve overcrowding. (The teachers' college, the forerunner of Concordia University Chicago, was relocated to Addison, Illinois, in 1864, and then to River Forest, Illinois, in 1913.) The students and classrooms occupied the three-story central section of the structure, while the two-story east and west wings were used as faculty residences. The college operated under the state charter for the German Theological Seminary (i.e., the practical seminary) that had been issued in 1850. A new charter for Concordia College of Fort Wayne that also legitimized that actions undertaken by the college while under the seminary charter was enacted by the Indiana General Assembly in 1881.

Recognizing that additional space would be needed in Fort Wayne, the 1860 convention resolution had authorized $20,000 for that purpose. Four additional lots on the north side of campus were purchased for $1,140 in April 1863. That same year, the "Oak Grove" on the west side was purchased for $2,400. A house for the school's director and a duplex for two faculty were also built in that year, freeing up the space in the Seminary Building that they formerly occupied. Finally, three lots in the northeast corner of the campus were obtained in 1872. The resulting campus encompassed the area bounded by what are now Maumee Avenue, Washington Boulevard, Anthony Avenue, and Schick Street.

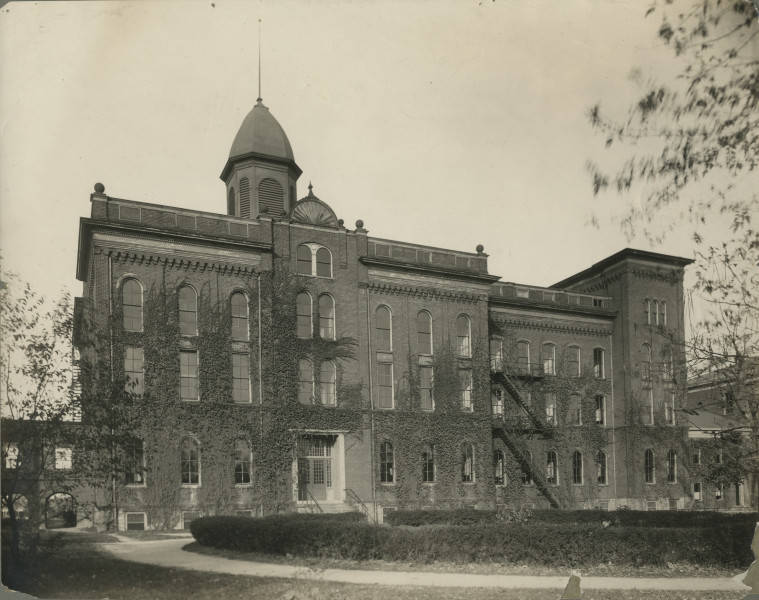
Hanser Hall, viewed from the south, in about 1900

Excavation for what eventually was named Hanser Hall began in 1863, but work was halted due to the Civil War and lack of funding. Work resumed in 1869, but the building was not completed and equipped until 1872. The 150-by-80-foot (46 m × 24 m) four-story building contained student housing on the upper stories and an auditorium-chapel called the Aula on the second. Completion of Hanser Hall resolved the overcrowding conditions, but not before conditions had worsened on December 28, 1869, when a fire in the Seminary Building destroyed the central section and severely damaged the east wing. The building suffered $5,000 in damages, and the students lost $4,000 in possessions. As a result of the fire, some students moved to other buildings on the campus, and 100 were lodged in private homes.

During the 1860s, complaints had been made in the synod regarding the conditions under which the students lived. Although those complaints were found generally to be unfounded, the complaints persisted. On July 12, 1866, synod president C. F. W. Walther indicated his support for the college's director, G. Alexander Saxer, who had held the position since 1858 and took a stern approach toward discipline. However, the fire and ensuing events increased the discontent, resulting in an official synodical investigation in 1872. As a result of the continuing complaints, Saxer and most of the faculty resigned during the next two years.

The new director, Carl Johann Otto Hanser, took a more fatherly approach to the students. Enrollment increased to about 300 students, but his requests to the synod for assistance were not heeded, leading Hanser to becoming physically exhausted and ultimately resigning in 1879. None of the four directors who followed Hanser served for more than eight years.

=== Twentieth century ===
During Martin H. Luecke's 24 years as director (1902–1926), several new building were constructed. In 1905, a second classroom building, Schick Hall, was erected. The 175-by-75-foot (53 m × 23 m) 2 1/2-story brick building cost $44,251.60 and contained a library and an auditorium on the second floor. A covered bridge the students called the "Bridge of Sighs" connected Schick Hall to Hanser Hall. The new library and auditorium In Schick Hall allowed the library and Aula in Hanser Hall to be repurposed. In 1911, an additional floor was built between the floor and ceiling of the Aula for more dormitory space.

In 1906, the school won the approval of the U.S. War Department to create a military department with a commandant assigned by the U.S. Army, thereby becoming a military academy. The college's main objective was to provide the students with organized physical education along with the discipline that a military program instilled. The structure of the program remained essentially unchanged until 1954, when the college-level section was dropped and the high school section became a Junior ROTC. unit.

Enrollment continued to increase, necessitating the construction of two residence halls. Sihler Hall was built in 1924 at a cost of $123.249.11, and Crull Hall, in 1925, for $112,152,05. The nearly identical 180-by-62-foot (55 m × 19 m) three-story buildings each accommodated 104 students.

The 1950 LCMS convention decided to add pre-teacher training of both men and women at the college. Residential female students were therefore first admitted that fall. Two of the faculty residences were converted to women's dorms: Martha Hall in 1950 and Sina Hall in 1953.

=== Concordia Lutheran High School ===
From early on, enrollment in Concordia was restricted to young men intending to go into the pastoral ministry. However, even the 1911 college catalog stated that the course of studies was also useful for those going into all other professions. In 1920, the leaders of the Fort Wayne Luther Institute, a two-year business and secretarial school founded in 1916, proposed a merger with the college's high school department, and the faculty asked the synod to add courses not related to seminary training, but no merger occurred. During the Great Depression in the 1930s, the synod actively encouraged such non-ministerial enrollments due to the decline in students who wanted to enter the seminaries and the corresponding decline in enrollment at Concordia and the other LCMS colleges.

In 1934, the Luther Institute again proposed a merger, which, after detailed planning, was approved in February 1935, subject to approval by the LCMS. The synod's convention approved the proposal in September 1935. The merged institution, which was coeducational, was originally known as the Lutheran High School, with its name being officially changed to Concordia Lutheran High School in March 1955.

Classes were originally held on the second and third floors of Hanser Hall after renovations paid for by the Lutheran churches in Fort Wayne. In September 1935, there were 205 ministerial and 96 non-ministerial students. Concordia College stopped admitting high school freshmen into its ministerial program in September 1951. A new high school building was opened in 1952 on 1.93 acres (0.78 ha) leased from the college on the southeast corner of the campus, and in 1955, six more classrooms were added to the building.

=== Closure ===
Ministerial students graduating from Concordia College and the synod's other junior colleges usually enrolled directly in Concordia Seminary in St. Louis. Starting in the 1920s, unsuccessful proposals were made to convert the synod's junior colleges into four-year colleges, which would be similar to the structure of theological education in other American denominations. In 1935, the synod convention voted to add a fourth year to the seminary curriculum, but in 1947, the synod decided instead to create a senior college that students would attend between junior college and seminary. In 1951, a committee of Concordia College leaders and local LCMS pastors urged that the senior college be located in Fort Wayne. In January 1953, a synodical committee recommended instead that the senior college be located in either Chicago or Milwaukee and had even taken an option on a site near Chicago, but the synod's convention in Houston later that year voted to locate it in Fort Wayne.

The resolution also required the closure of Concordia College and the sale of its campus, with the proceeds helping to fund the construction of Concordia Senior College at a new campus. Negotiations for sale of the campus to the Indiana Technical College had begun already in 1952. In addition to the approximately $1 million from the sale, $400,000 that had been earmarked for improvements at the old campus were directed to the senior college construction. Approximately 4.86 acres (1.97 ha) of land containing the high school building and two faculty residences in the southeast corner of the campus were transferred to Concordia High School and not included in the sale. That parcel was later also sold to Indiana Tech when the high school moved to a new campus in 1964. The high school building is now Indiana Tech's Cunningham Business Center. Academic buildings Hanser Hall and Schick Hall and dormitories Crull Hall and Sihler Hall were used by Indiana Tech for a number of years, but have since been demolished.

The original plan was to vacate the old campus by July 1, 1955, but construction delays pushed that date to June 30, 1956. The final year of classes for the junior college was conducted at the new campus, with the final graduation ceremony on May 26, 1957, and a "Farewell to Concordia College" service on June 12. Concordia Senior College was designated as the legal and historical successor to Concordia College.

== Curriculum ==
From the school's inception until the 1930s, the curriculum at Concordia College (and at the other pre-seminary schools of the LCMS) followed the pattern of the German gymnasium, with a heavy emphasis on the classical languages of Latin and Greek and, in the final (Prima) year, Hebrew. Most courses were conducted in Latin and the rest in German, except for English language classes. As was typical of the German model of education, instructors were given little flexibility in teaching techniques and students were expected to obediently master the material. Students had 30 to 35 periods of instruction each week, even in the junior college department. The textbooks were the same ones used in Germany, although by 1900, some American textbooks in mathematics and the sciences began to be used.

By the early 1900s, the use of English among the membership of the LCMS was becoming more common, and the use of German was declining. This caused difficulties for students at Concordia, where German was still assumed to be common language. The language issue became even more complicated in 1921, when the Slovak Evangelical Lutheran Church began sending its pre-seminary students to Concordia, necessitating the addition of Slovak-language classes. Notices began appearing in the college catalogs in the 1920s that emphasized the expectation for students to become fluent in German and Latin. In 1920, the synod's convention directed that the American terminology of "high school" and "junior college" be used for the first four and last two years, respectively, of the pre-seminary schools, and in 1935, when the high school department merged with the Luther Institute, Concordia officially replaced the Latin names of the classes (Sexta, Quinta, Quarta, Tertia, Secunda, and Prima) with the American equivalents (high school freshman, sophomore, junior, and senior, and college freshman and sophomore).

Several studies at the synodical level of the LCMS examined the educational structure and content of the LCMS colleges and seminaries. In 1938, the synod convention adopted a resolution to restructure the curriculum at Concordia and the other colleges. Latin and German were de-emphasized, the study of Greek was restricted to the junior college years, and the study of Hebrew was moved exclusively to the seminaries. More instructional time was given to social studies and the natural sciences. Moreover, the student class load at the junior college level was reduced to 15–18 hours of classroom time per week, as was common in most American colleges.

Beginning in 1952, graduates were awarded an Associates of Arts degree. Prior to that they had received only a diploma.

== Athletics ==
Baseball was first played at Concordia in 1867. Opponents consisted of local and nearby independent teams until the school joined the Indiana Intercollegiate Conference sometime after that body's establishment in 1922. Competition after that was limited to other colleges, most of which were four-year institutions. Several Concordia team members, including Max Carey and Bill Wambsganss, later played in Major League baseball.

The first basketball team was formed in 1909, and contained members from both the high school and the college departments. This was the same year a new gymnasium had been constructed, replacing the school's first gym that had measured only 63 by 30 feet (19.2 m × 9.1 m). However, the roof trusses of the new gym were low enough that some shots had to be threaded through them. In 1928, the gym was renovated and the floor was lowered several feet. The high school and college teams had several successful seasons. For example, in 1953 the college team (known as the Cavaliers) participated in the National Junior College Athletic Association's basketball tournament.

Football was played in the early 1900s, but was discontinued due to the death of a player. However, the sport was revived from 1926 until 1932, when it was again dropped due to the expense, injuries, and lack of other junior college competition. The team won only one game in those six years.

Until the 1920s, administrative regulations at Concordia prevented its teams from playing against other schools, either at home or away, except for Culver Military Academy, which, like Concordia, was a military academy.

== Directors and presidents ==
When the college was part of the same institution as the seminary, the title of the head of the school was that of "director". This continued even after the relocation to Fort Wayne. During the first part of the twentieth century, the title of "president" became more commonly used, and became official during the term of William C. Burhop.

- Adolph Biewend (1852–1858)
- G. Alexander Saxer (1858–1872)
- Carl Johann Otto Hanser (1872–1879)
- Frederick Zucker (1879–1881)
- Rudolph Adam Bischoff (1881–1886)
- Andrew Baepler (1888–1894)
- Joseph Martin Schmidt (1894–1902)
- Martin H. Luecke (1902–1926)
- William C. Burhop (1926–1937)
- Ottomar Krueger (1937–1945)
- Herbert George Bredemeier (1945–1957)

== Notable faculty and alumni ==
- G. Christian Barth – president of Concordia College in Wisconsin
- Karl L. Barth – president of Concordia Seminary in St. Louis
- Max Carey – Major League baseball player and manager
- Ludwig E. Fuerbringer – president of Concordia Seminary in St. Louis
- Friedrich Pfotenhauer – fifth president of the LCMS
- Georg Schick – Concordia College professor of classical languages
- George V. Schick – Concordia College and Concordia Seminary professor
- Ernest Gottlieb Sihler – professor of classics at New York University
- Bill Wambsganss – Major League baseball player

== Sources ==
- Bredemeier, Herbert George (1978). Concordia College: Fort Wayne, Indiana, 1839-1957. Fort Wayne, Indiana: Fort Wayne Public Library.
- Harter, Randy (April 19, 2019). "Concordia Lutheran High School – 1984". Fort Wayne Reader.
- Repp, Arthur C., ed. (1947). 100 Years of Christian Education. River Forest, Illinois: Lutheran Education Association.
- The Concordian. Fort Wayne, Indiana: Senior Class of Concordia College. 1916.
