= Oliver Harms =

- Born: December 11, 1901; Cole Camp, Missouri
- Died: June 3, 1980 (aged 78); Houston, Texas
- Education: Concordia Seminary
- Church: Lutheran Church–Missouri Synod
- Ordained: 1926
- Offices held: President, LCMS (1962–1969)

Oliver Raymond Harms (December 11, 1901 in Cole Camp, Missouri – June 3, 1980 in Houston, Texas) was the seventh president of the Lutheran Church–Missouri Synod (LCMS) from 1962 to 1969.

Oliver Harms was a 1926 graduate of Concordia Seminary, St. Louis. He was ordained on October 4, 1926, as pastor of Trinity Lutheran Church in Eden, Texas, where he served from 1926 to 1935. Also in 1926, he married Bertha Serrien. In 1935, he became pastor of Trinity Lutheran Church in Houston, Texas, where he succeeded John W. Benhken, who had become the sixth president of the LCMS.

Harms served as a vice-president of the Texas District from 1939 to 1948, and as president from 1948 to 1950. From 1941 to 1947 he was a member of the Board of Electors of Concordia Seminary, St. Louis. He served the LCMS as a member of its board of directors from 1950 to 1956, as a vice-president from 1956 to 1959, and as president from 1962 to 1969. In 1953, he was awarded an honorary Doctor of Divinity degree from Concordia Seminary, St. Louis.

Harms died on June 3, 1980, in Houston. He and his wife are buried in Trinity Lutheran Cemetery in that city.

Religious titles
Preceded by John W. Behnken	President; Lutheran Church–Missouri Synod; 1962–1969	Succeeded by J. A. O. Preus II
