= Otto Fuerbringer =

American journalist and editor of Time magazine

- Otto Fuerbringer in 1982
- Born: September 27, 1910; St. Louis, Missouri, U.S.
- Died: July 27, 2008 (aged 97); Fullerton, California, U.S.
- Education: Harvard University (AB)
- Occupations: Journalist, editor
- Employers: Time; People; Money
- Spouse: Winona Gunn (m. 1940)
- Children: 4
- Father: Ludwig E. Fuerbringer

Otto Fuerbringer (September 27, 1910 – July 28, 2008) was an editor for the American news magazine Time.

== Early life and education ==
Fuerbringer was born in St. Louis, Missouri, U.S. to Ludwig and Anna Zucker Fuerbringer. His father was a Lutheran minister. He was the youngest of five children. His brother was Alfred Fuerbringer, a Lutheran seminary president. He later attended Harvard University, where he was president of The Harvard Crimson.

== Career ==
After graduating from Harvard in 1932, he started working for the St. Louis Post-Dispatch, before being hired by Time in 1942. Reaching the rank of assistant managing editor in 1951, he was appointed managing editor in 1960. Later, as head of Time Inc.'s magazine-development group, he also introduced People and Money magazines. He did much to rejuvenate what was a rather austere publication, and once famously said of the journalism his staff did that "It only has to be true this week." Though a social conservative, Fuerbringer nevertheless did much to focus the magazine's attention on the counter-culture and the political and intellectual radicalism of the 1960s.

During Fuerbringer's tenure as editor, the magazine's circulation rose from three to five million. His best known act as editor was probably his April 8, 1966 cover story "Is God Dead?" In the accompanying article he explored the role of religion in an increasingly secular society, and investigated a trend among contemporary theologians to write God out of the field of theology. Fuerbringer had initially been a supporter of the Vietnam War, but in 1968 he wrote an editorial conceding that the war was unwinnable.

Shortly before his death, in 2007, he wrote an autobiography, titled "On TIME".

== Personal life ==
Fuerbringer married Winona Gunn in 1940. They remained married until his death 68 years later. The couple had two sons, Jonathan and Peter, and two daughters, Alexis and Juliana.

== Death and legacy ==
Fuerbringer died in Fullerton, California in a retirement home. The Pulitzer Prize-winning journalist David Halberstam once said of Fuerbringer "He was the most controversial man within Time magazine, immensely influential, perhaps the most influential conservative of his generation in journalism, but outside the magazine almost no one knew his name." Time employees sometimes called him "Otto Fingerbanger" or "The Iron Chancellor" for his imperious demeanor.

== See also ==
- Time
- People
- Money
