= Ludwig E. Fuerbringer =

Lutheran minister and seminary president

Ludwig Ernst Fuerbringer (March 29, 1864 – May 6, 1947) was a Lutheran minister and the president of Concordia Seminary in St. Louis.

== Life ==
Ludwig Fuerbringer was born on March 29, 1884, in Frankenmuth, Michigan. His father was Rev. Dr. Ottomar Fuerbringer, a Lutheran pastor and teacher. He attended Concordia College in Fort Wayne, Indiana, and later Concordia Seminary in St. Louis. He studied under C. F. W. Walther. He was ordained in June 1885.

He joined the faculty of Concordia Seminary in 1893, where he taught Bible interpretation. He was also the editor of Der Lutheraner. He served as president of the seminary from 1931 to 1943. He was succeeded by Louis J. Sieck.

He and his wife, Anna, had five children, including Alfred Fuerbringer, who also became president of Concordia Seminary in St. Louis, Otto Fuerbringer, Clara Reinke, Irmgard Zorn, and Agnes M. Fuerbringer.

He died on May 6, 1947, and is buried at Concordia Cemetery in St. Louis.

== Works ==
- Persons and Events: Reminiscences of Ludwig Ernest Fuerbringer. St. Louis: Concordia Publishing House, 1947.
