= John Tietjen =

Lutheran minister and seminary president

John H. Tietjen (June 18, 1928 – February 15, 2004) was a Lutheran clergyman, theologian, and national church leader in the United States. He is best known both for his role in the Seminex controversy which roiled the Lutheran Church – Missouri Synod (LCMS) in the mid-1970s, and for his efforts on behalf of Lutheran unity that resulted in the formation of the Evangelical Lutheran Church in America (ELCA).

== Life and work ==
Tietjen was born in New York City as a son of German immigrants, and he attended Stuyvesant High School, Concordia Collegiate Institute (later Concordia College, Bronxville), and Concordia Seminary in St. Louis, Missouri. He also earned master's and doctorate degrees at Union Theological Seminary in New York. After being ordained in the LCMS in 1953, Tietjen rose through the synod ranks and eventually was chosen as president of its largest seminary, Concordia Seminary, in 1969.

While president of Concordia Seminary, Tietjen and many of the Concordia faculty members faced opposition from a new, more conservative administration of the LCMS. The faculty's use of historical-critical method for Biblical interpretation was cast by conservatives as being at odds with the historic theological position of the LCMS. Tietjen was accused of allowing the teaching of false doctrine, and he was suspended from his duties as seminary president in January 1974.

As a result, Tietjen and the majority of the seminary faculty formed a rival seminary that they dubbed Concordia Seminary in Exile, or Seminex. Seminex existed in St. Louis until August 1983, and on the campus of the Lutheran School of Theology at Chicago (LSTC) until December 1987. Meanwhile, Tietjen and many of his supporters left the LCMS to form the more liberal Association of Evangelical Lutheran Churches (AELC). During the early 1980s, Tietjen and the AELC organized unity talks among several other Lutheran church bodies, eventually leading to the formation of the Evangelical Lutheran Church in America (ELCA), which today is the largest Lutheran church body in the United States.

In 1989 he moved to Fort Worth, Texas, to pastor Trinity Lutheran Church; he served there until 2002.

== Personal life ==
In 1953, John Tietjen married Ernestine Catherine Dammitts (1925–2015). They had four children, Catherine, Laurence, Mary, and Sarah. He also has seven grandchildren Jessica, Jennifer, Carrie, Rachel, Joseph, Elizabeth, and Chase.

John Tietjen battled lung cancer, pancreatic cancer, blood clots, and finally a brain tumor. He died at his home. During the last few months before his death he was working on a final book titled The Gospel According to Jesus. The original transcripts were typed, edited by his peers, and published by a private individual.

== Books by Tietjen ==
- Which Way to Lutheran Unity?: A History of Efforts to Unite the Lutherans of America (St. Louis: Concordia Publishing House, 1966) ISBN B0000CN8LC
- Memoirs in Exile: Confessional Hope and Institutional Conflict (Minneapolis: Augsburg Fortress, 1990) ISBN 0-8006-2462-9 A first-person account of the Seminex controversy:
- The Gospel According to Jesus (St. Louis: Creative Communications for the Parish, 2006).
- Profiles in Belief: The Religious Bodies of the United States and Canada (with Arthur Piepkorn)
