= Ernest Gottlieb Sihler =

American classical philologist (1853–1942)

Ernest Gottlieb Sihler (1853–1942) was a professor of classics at New York University. Born in Fort Wayne, Indiana, he was the son of Lutheran missionary Wilhelm Sihler and great-uncle to Andrew Sihler. Sihler's professional name was Ernest G. Sihler, but within the Sihler family he was always known as Gottlieb.

He graduated from Concordia College in Fort Wayne in 1869, Concordia Seminary in St. Louis, Missouri, in 1872, and then studied in Berlin and Leipzig from 1872 to 1875. He received his Ph.D. from Johns Hopkins in 1878.

He was a classics instructor in New York from 1879 to 1891, and a professor at Concordia College in Milwaukee, Wisconsin, from 1891 to 1892. He then became a professor at the Graduate School of New York University. Not long after leaving Concordia College for his post at New York University, he endowed a library fund there for the purchase of "books of standard value" (i.e., presumably excluding rare books, incunabula, and so on).

== Major works ==
- De parodiis eis quibus exprimitur a comicis Graecis iudicium seu censura. Leipzig: Friedrich Andrae, 1875. (Ph.D. dissertation)
- The Protagoras of Plato, with an Introduction and Notes. New York: Harper & Brothers, 1881.
- A Complete Lexicon of the Latinity of Caesar's Gallic War. Boston: Ginn, 1891.
- M. Tulli Ciceronis Oratio Philippica secunda. Boston: D. C. Heath, 1908.
- Testimonium Animae; or, Greek and Roman before Jesus Christ: A Series of Essays and Sketches Dealing with the Spiritual Elements in Classical Civilization New York: G. E. Stechert, 1908.
- Annals of Cæsar: A Critical Biography with a Survey of the Sources, for More Advanced Students of Ancient History and Particularly for the Use and Service of Instructors in Cæsar. New York: G. E. Stechert, 1911.
- C. Julius Caesar. Sein Leben nach den Quellen kritisch dargestellt. Leipzig: B. G. Teubner, 1912.
- Cicero of Arpinum: A Political and Literary Biography, Being a Contribution to the History of Ancient Civilization and a Guide to the Study of Cicero. New Haven: Yale University Press, 1914.
- Coeditor. Hellenic Civilization: Records of Civilization; Sources and Studies. New York: Columbia University Press, 1915.
- From Augustus to Augustine: Essays and Studies Dealing with the Contact and Conflict of Classic Paganism and Christianity. Cambridge: Cambridge University Press, 1923.
- From Maumee to Thames and Tiber: The Life Story of an American Classical Scholar. New York: New York University Press, 1930 (autobiography).
