= William W. Sihler =

American academic (born 1937)

William W. Sihler (born 17 November 1937) is an American academic.

He earned undergraduate and graduate degrees from Harvard University and taught at Harvard Business School before joining the Darden School of Business at the University of Virginia in 1967. Sihler was later appointed Ronald Edward Trzcinski Professor of Business Administration and granted emeritus status upon retirement.
