= Robert Bergt =

Robert Bergt (January 7, 1930 – July 26, 2011) was Artist-in-Residence and Bach scholar at Concordia Seminary in St. Louis, Missouri, a position he held since 1995. Bergt is known as a symphonic and chorale conductor with a specialization in the music of Johann Sebastian Bach and other masters of the Baroque, Renaissance, Classical, and Neoclassical periods.

== Career ==
Bergt was founder and music director of the American Kantorei. Bergt had held tenure at three academic institutions at the graduate and undergraduate levels: Concordia Seminary in St. Louis as instructor from 1956 to 1960 and as assistant/associate professor in the areas of Church Music and Worship from 1960 to 1974, Southern Illinois University at Carbondale from 1974 to 1984, and at Valparaiso University from 1984 to 1988. Tokyo’s Musashino Academia Musicae engaged Bergt as orchestral conductor and graduate professor of chamber music in 1981 and again on a continuing basis from 1988 to 1995. Bergt was concertmaster and assistant conductor of the St. Louis Philharmonic from 1949 to 1955. He appeared as soloist with the Minneapolis Symphony in 1956. In addition, he was first violinist of Ford Foundation Young Audiences String Quartet from 1960 to 1968. At the seminary, he conducted the Chapel Choir, the Schola Cantorum, and the Seminary Chorus. He also held the position of concertmaster with the Fort Wayne Philharmonic and Civic Orchestras.

In 1972, he conducted the American Kantorei in the opening concert of the National American Guild of Organists, Dallas, in performances of Bach's Motets 1, 2, 5, and 6.

== Awards ==
In 2000, Bergt received the Wittenberg Award from the Luther Institute, Washington D.C., for outstanding contributions through art and music to the international community and Church. The Avis Blewett Award was bestowed on Bergt in 1966 by the St. Louis Regional Chapel of the AGO in recognition of distinguished music contributions to the community. Classical radio station KFUO-FM honored him in 2004 for his outstanding service and contributions to St. Louis metropolitan region and the world through KFUO’s worldwide internet streaming.
