= Concordia Seminary =

Lutheran theological seminary in Missouri

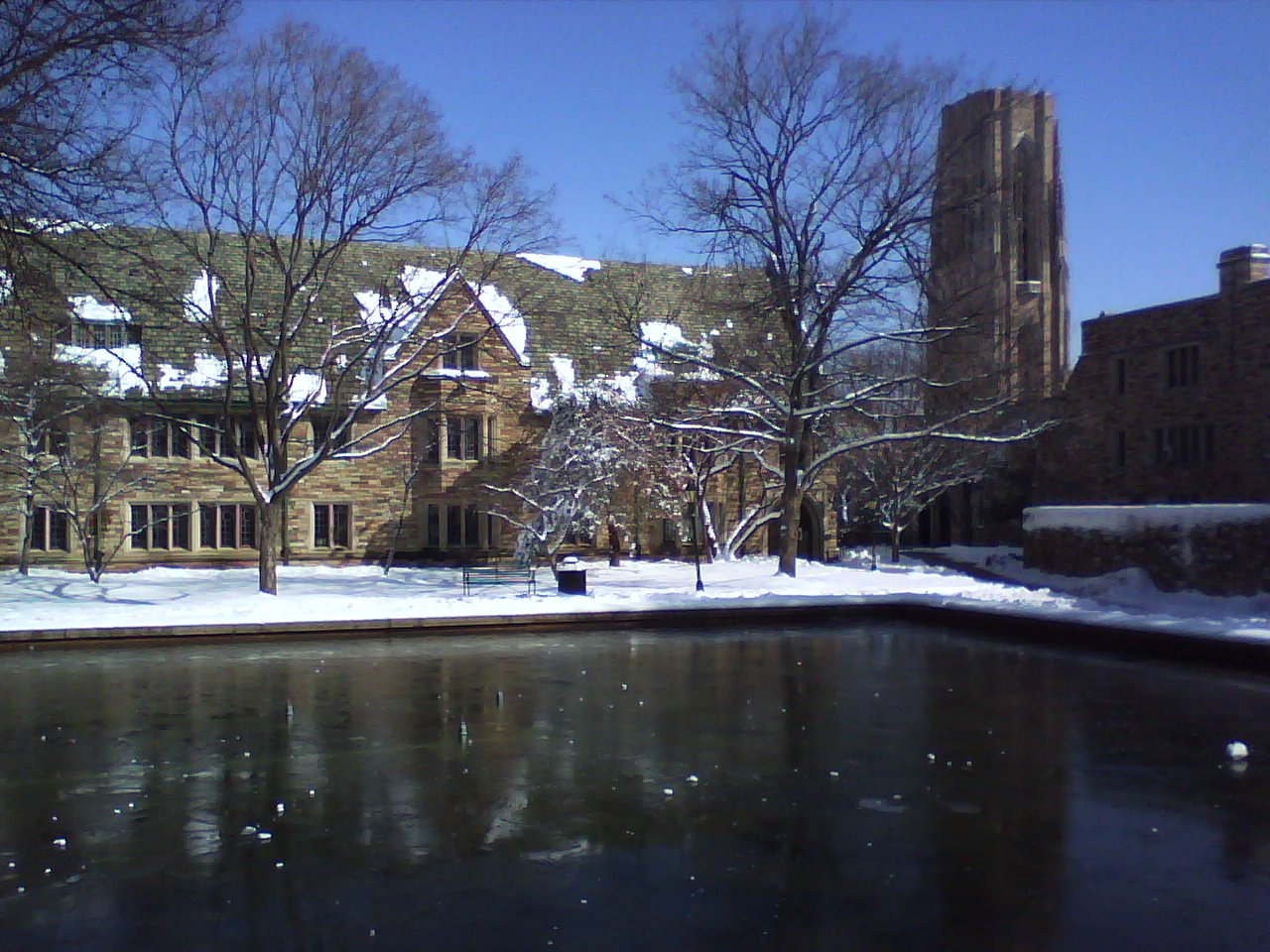
- Concordia Seminary on March 5, 2008
- Type: Seminary
- Established: 1839; 187 years ago
- Religious affiliation: Lutheran Church–Missouri Synod
- Endowment: $234.8 million (2024)
- President: Thomas J. Egger
- Academic staff: 26 (full time)
- Students: 591 (2024)
- Location: Clayton (St. Louis postal address), Missouri, United States; 38.6382°N 90.3113°W
- Website: csl.edu

Concordia Seminary is a Lutheran seminary in Clayton, Missouri. The institution's primary mission is to train pastors, deaconesses, missionaries, chaplains, and church leaders for the Lutheran Church–Missouri Synod (LCMS). Founded in 1839, the seminary initially resided in Perry County, Missouri. In 1849, it was moved to St. Louis, and in 1926, the current campus was built.

The St. Louis institution was at one time considered the "theoretical" (academic) seminary of the LCMS while Concordia Theological Seminary in Fort Wayne was considered the "practical" seminary, although those distinctions no longer exist. Concordia Seminary currently offers a Master of Divinity degree leading to ordination, as well as Master of Arts, Master of Sacred Theology, Doctor of Ministry, and Doctor of Philosophy degrees. The seminary is considered theologically conservative. It does not train women for ordination as pastors. However, it does offer a program by which women may be rostered as deaconesses (a category of "ministers of religion" within the LCMS). It promotes historical-grammatical interpretation of the Bible. It is an accredited member of the Association of Theological Schools in the United States and Canada and is accredited by the Higher Learning Commission.

Radio station KFUO-AM had its studios on the seminary campus until they were relocated to the LCMS International Center in the St. Louis suburb of Kirkwood, MO although the station continues to use a transmitter tower on the campus. For many years the nationally broadcast Lutheran Hour originated from this LCMS radio station.

== Chapel of St. Timothy and St. Titus ==
The Chapel of St. Timothy and St. Titus

Dedicated on November 15, 1992, the Chapel of St. Timothy and St. Titus serves as the house of worship for the Concordia Seminary community. Aside from the primary worship space the chapel building also contains a choir practice room, one classroom, the dean of chapel's office, the housefellow's quarters, and a chapel that is used primarily for small worship services and for worship practice.

== Library ==
Concordia Seminary Library has the capacity to house 250,000 volumes and to seat over 300 people, providing study space for divinity students and carrels for graduate students and scholars. The book collection numbers over 245,000 volumes. Included are the personal libraries of many of the founding fathers of the LCMS and its theologians, including C. F. W. Walther. A copy of the 17th-century Calov Bible that was owned by Johann Sebastian Bach is also in the collection.

== Luther statue ==
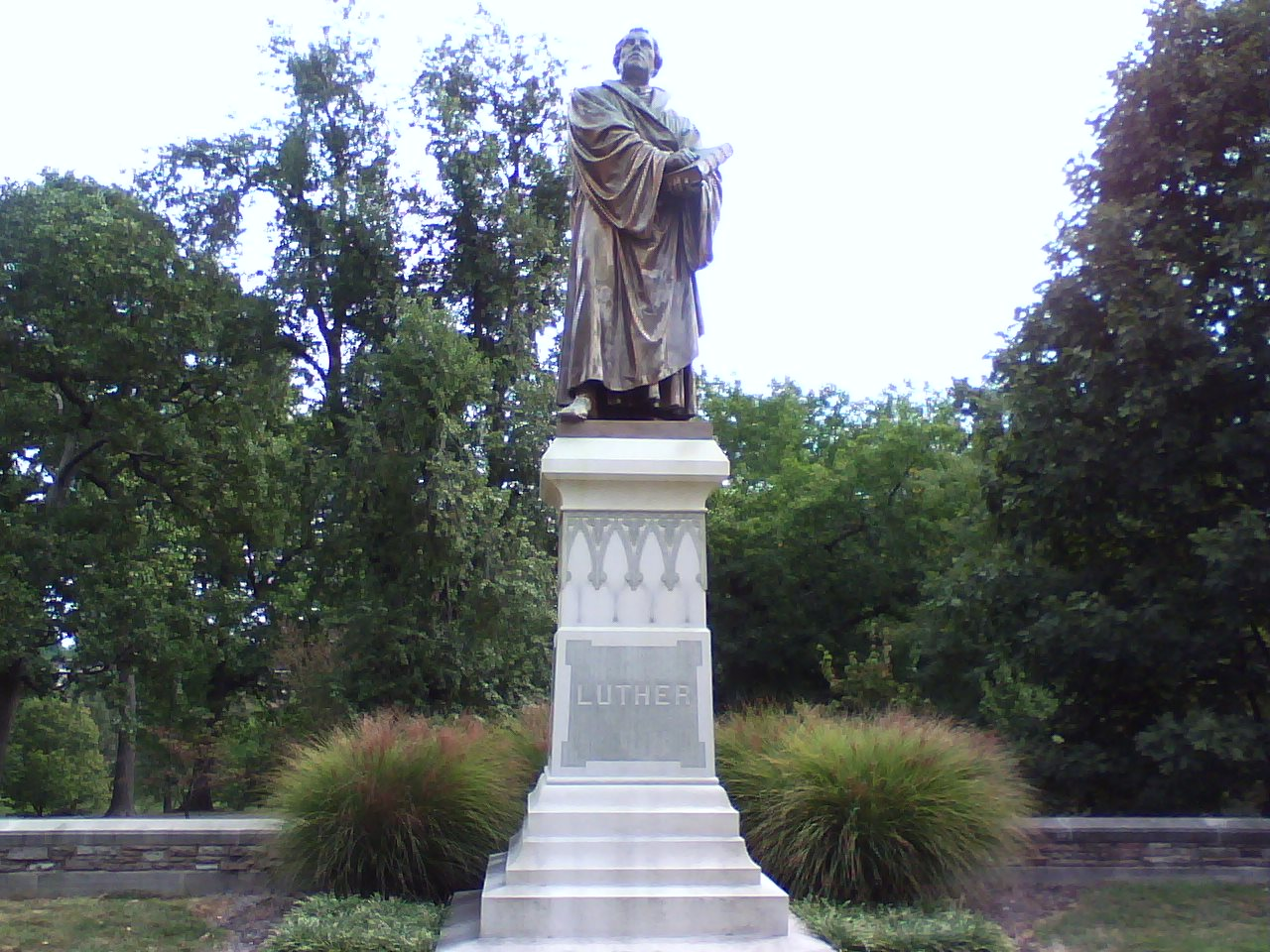
Luther statue

Located next to Founder's Hall, the Luther Statue was originally dedicated at the former site of Concordia Seminary on Jefferson Avenue in St. Louis in 1903. In 1926, when the present campus was dedicated in Clayton, the statue was relocated to the new campus site. The statue is an exact replica the one in the Luther Monument in Worms, Germany. The statue in Germany is located where Martin Luther made his "Here I Stand" speech at the Diet of Worms.

== Luther Tower ==
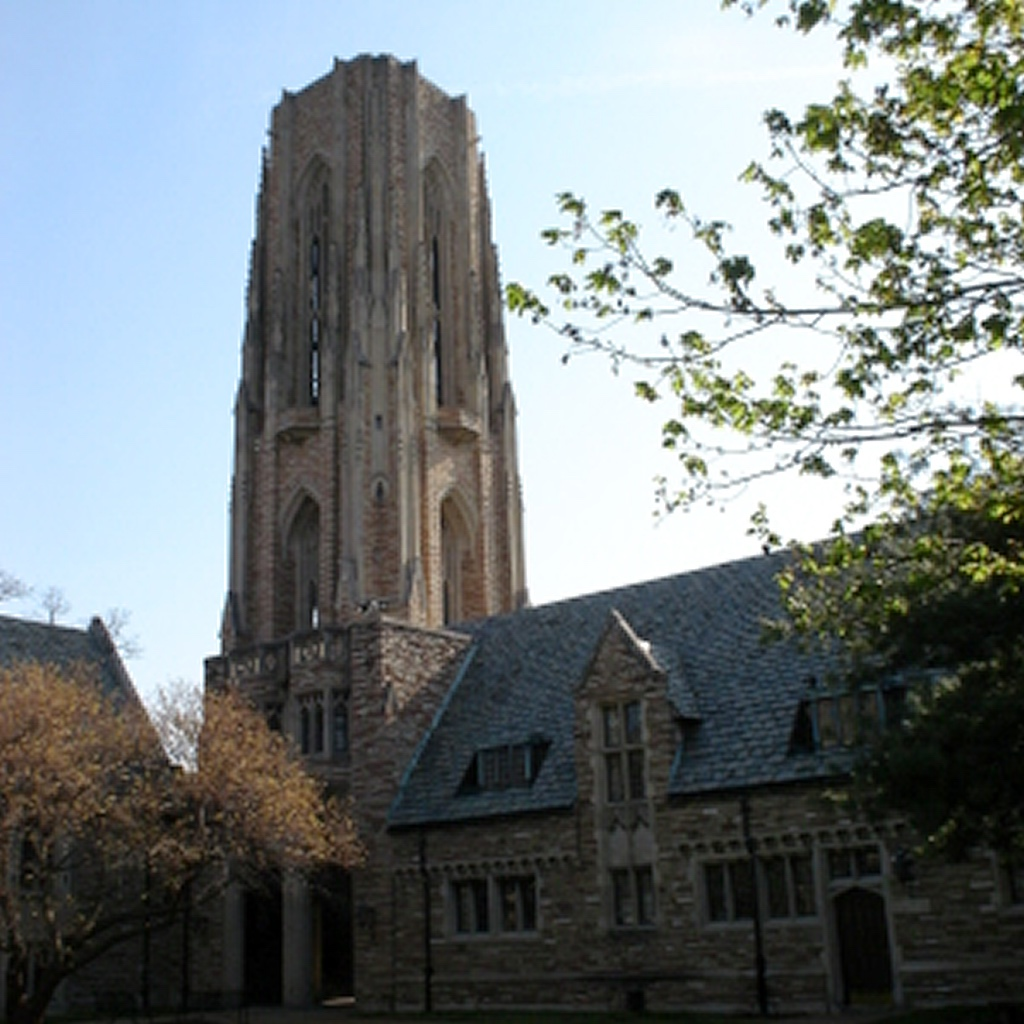
Part of the historic campus including Luther Tower

Luther Tower was designed by architect Charles Klauder and was completed in 1966. It stands 156 feet (48 m) tall. At its base is a small chapel, the Chapel of the Holy Apostles. Its crown contains a 49-bell carillon. The bells are dedicated to the memory of all LCMS pastors. The largest bell weighs 2.5 short tons (2,300 kg) and the smallest weighs 17 pounds (7.7 kg).

== Concordia Historical Institute ==
The Concordia Historical Institute is the Department of Archives and History of the LCMS. The institute is located at 804 Seminary Place on the Concordia Seminary campus. The building includes a reference room for patrons, a conference room, a museum exhibit space, and three stack areas for storage of the collections.

The institute maintains the Saxon Lutheran Memorial and the Peace Lutheran Church historic sites in Perry County, Missouri. It also publishes the Concordia Historical Institute Quarterly, and assists districts and congregations of the LCMS to preserve their historical records.

== Concordia Park ==
Concordia Park is located in the DeMun neighborhood on the grounds of Concordia Seminary. The city of Clayton has leased this passive 1.5-acre (0.607 ha) park from the seminary since 1992. It consists of several hills and trees. Benches and tables are provided for visitors. It was named a Best Picnic Spot by the Riverfront Times in 2008.

== Athletics ==
Concordia has varsity basketball and tennis teams, but the teams are not affiliated with any league. It also offers club sports including golf and soccer. Known as the Fighting Preachers, the basketball team schedules games with other independents as well as with some NCAA Division III teams. There is a longstanding rivalry with the other LCMS seminary, Concordia Theological Seminary in Fort Wayne, Indiana; Concordia had won every game in that rivalry for 24 years (as of 2008).

The basketball team plays in the Eldon E. Pederson Fieldhouse. The fieldhouse originally was an airplane hangar on an airbase in Kansas. In 1949 the seminary purchased it, disassembled it, and re-erected it on the campus. At one time it served as the practice court of the NBA's St. Louis Hawks and as the home court for the ABA's Spirits of St. Louis.

== Seminex controversy ==
Concordia Seminary became a focus of national media attention in 1974, when 45 of its 50 faculty members, together with the vast majority of students, walked out of campus to form a rival institution known as Seminex, or Concordia Seminary in Exile. The procession protested the suspension of the seminary's president, John Tietjen, who faced charges from the conservative Synodical president, Jacob Preus, of allowing the teaching of false doctrine. More specifically, the charges alleged that Tietjen had permitted the teaching of historical-critical methods of scriptural interpretation, rather than upon exegetical principles that consider scripture to be the inerrant word of God (see Biblical inerrancy). During this same period, in 1975, Concordia was added to a list of censured institutions by the American Association of University Professors.

Seminex struggled due in part to the LCMS preventing it from placing graduates in ministerial positions within the LCMS. It suffered a gradually declining enrollment over the course of the late 1970s, with the last St. Louis commencement being held in May 1983. It continued to exist as an educational institution at the Lutheran School of Theology at Chicago campus through the end of 1987. Seminex contributed to a major schism in the LCMS.

== Presidents ==
No.	Name	Term	Ref
1	C. F. W. Walther	1850–1887	
2	Franz Pieper	1887–1931	
3	Ludwig E. Fuerbringer	1931–1943	
4	Louis J. Sieck	1943–1952	
5	Alfred Fuerbringer	1953–1969	
6	John H. Tietjen	1969–1974	
7	Ralph Arthur Bohlmann	1975–1981	
8	Karl L. Barth	1982–1990	
9	John F. Johnson	1990–2004	
10	Dale A. Meyer	2005–2020	
11	Thomas J. Egger	2021–present	

== Notable faculty ==
- Robert Bergt – associate professor in church music and worship (1956–1974), artist-in-residence and Bach scholar (1995–2011)
- Ralph Arthur Bohlmann – professor (1960–1981)
- Frederick William Danker – professor (1954–1974), left to join Seminex
- Martin Franzmann – professor (1946–1969), chairman of exegetical theology department (1957–1969)
- Norman Habel – associate professor of Biblical studies (1960–1973)
- Robert Kolb – professor of systemic theology (1993–2009)
- Reed Lessing – professor of exegetical theology (1999–2013)
- Walter A. Maier – professor of Old Testament history and interpretation (1922–1930)
- Franz Pieper – professor of systematic theology (1878–1931)
- Robert David Preus – professor of systematic theology (1957–1974)
- George V. Schick – professor of the Old Testament and Hebrew (1936–1964)
- Mark A. Seifrid – professor of exegetical theology (2015–present)
- Louis J. Sieck – professor of pastoral theology (1943–1952)
- Robert H. Smith – professor (1968–1974), left to join Seminex

== Notable alumni ==
- Alvin L. Barry – tenth president of the LCMS
- G. Christian Barth – president of Concordia College in Wisconsin
- Karl L. Barth – president of Concordia Seminary
- William F. Beck – Lutheran pastor, author of The Holy Bible, An American Translation of the Bible
- John William Behnken – sixth president of the LCMS
- David Benke – former president of the Atlantic District of the LCMS
- Ralph Arthur Bohlmann – ninth president of the LCMS
- Frederick William Danker – New Testament scholar and an editor of the Bauer Lexicon
- Joseph Ellwanger – Lutheran pastor and civil rights activist
- Jack Faszholz – Major League pitcher and later Lutheran pastor
- Flame – Christian rapper
- Clifford Flanigan – professor of English, medievalist, and theatre history
- Henry F. Gerecke – Lutheran pastor and U.S. Army chaplain during the Nuremberg trials
- Ole Grönsberg – second president of Pacific Lutheran University
- J. C. M. Hanson – American librarian
- Oliver Raymond Harms – seventh president of the LCMS
- Alan Harre – 17th president of Valparaiso University
- Bjug Harstad – founding president of Pacific Lutheran University and first president of the Evangelical Lutheran Synod
- Joel D. Heck – professor of theology at Concordia University Texas
- Paul Heyne – American economist
- Torger Juve – member of the Wisconsin State Assembly
- Jack Dean Kingsbury – former professor of theology at Union Presbyterian Seminary in Richmond, Virginia
- Ralph W. Klein – emeritus professor of Old Testatment at Lutheran School of Theology at Chicago
- O. P. Kretzmann – former president of Valparaiso University
- James F. Laatsch – former member of the Wisconsin State Assembly
- Reed Lessing – professor at Concordia University, St. Paul
- Richard Lischer – professor emeritus at Duke Divinity School
- Paul L. Maier – author and former professor of ancient history at Western Michigan University
- Walter A. Maier – speaker on The Lutheran Hour radio broadcast
- Martin E. Marty – American Lutheran religious scholar
- Adolph F. Meyer – American Lutheran pastor
- Thorbjorn N. Mohn – first president of St. Olaf College
- Richard John Neuhaus – founder and editor of First Things monthly journal
- Walter Obare – former presiding bishop of the Evangelical Lutheran Church in Kenya
- Jaroslav Pelikan – American scholar of the history of Christianity, Christian theology, and medieval intellectual history at Yale University
- Friedrich Pfotenhauer – fifth president of the LCMS
- Franz Pieper – fourth president of the LCMS and author of Christliche Dogmatik
- J. A. O. Preus III – former president of Concordia University Irvine
- Paul Rajashekar – professor of systematic theology at United Lutheran Seminary
- Bong Rin Ro – American theologian and missiologist.
- Carl Schalk – Lutheran composer, author, and lecturer
- Robert P. Scharlemann – American professor of religion known for his theological works on the being of God and as an interpreter of Paul Tillich
- Norbert Schedler – professor of philosophy and founding director of the Honors College at the University of Central Arkansas
- Berthold von Schenk – pastor of the LCMS and pioneer of Lutheran liturgical renewal
- Paul W. Schroeder – professor emeritus of history at the University of Illinois
- Milton Sernett – professor of American history at Syracuse University
- Louis J. Sieck – former president of Concordia Seminary
- Ernest Gottlieb Sihler – professor of classics at New York University
- Arthur Simon – founder and former president of Bread for the World
- Robert H. Smith – Lutheran theologian and lecturer on the New Testament
- Stephen J. Stein – American historian of religion
- Frederick William Stellhorn – professor of German at Capital University, professor at the Evangelical Lutheran Theological Seminary of the Ohio Synod
- Peer Stromme – Lutheran pastor and author of books about the experience of Norwegian immigrants to America
- Hans Gerhard Stub – bishop of the Norwegian Lutheran Church in America
- Gregory N. Todd – 20th Chaplain of the Marine Corps
- Ralph Underwager – Lutheran pastor and psychologist who rose to prominence as a defense witness for adults accused of child sexual abuse in the 1980s and 1990s
- Jaroslav Vajda – American hymnist
- Robert E. Webber – American theologian who played a key role in the Convergence Movement
