= Timeline of the Lutheran Church – Missouri Synod =

The following is a timeline of significant events in the history of the Lutheran Church – Missouri Synod.

== 19th century ==
- 1838
  - Martin Stephan, several pastors, and 600 to 700 German Lutherans from Saxony embark on four ships in November to emigrate to the United States to establish a colony in which they can freely practice their religion. Stephan is declared to be the group's bishop during the voyage.
- 1839
  - January 19: The Saxons begin landing in St. Louis, Missouri.
  - The Saxons purchase acreage in Perry County, Missouri, and Stephan and part of the group relocate to it.
  - Stephan is accused of having sexual affairs with women of the colony and is deposed and exiled to the Illinois side of the Mississippi River.
  - The loss of Stephan causes many to wonder if they are a legitimate church. The Altenburg debate between Carl Vehlse and C. F. W. Walther on these questions results in most members remaining and Walther eventually becoming the leader.
  - December 9: Luther College/Altenburg Seminary holds its first classes in the "log cabin college" in Perry County.
- 1840
  - F. C. D. Wyneken's Distress of the German Lutherans in North America, advocating for missionaries to be sent, is published in Germany.
- 1841
  - Wilhelm Löhe, a parish pastor in Neuendettelsau, Bavaria, starts to solicit funds to train and send missionaries to the United States.
- 1842
  - August 5: Löhe sends the first two of what will eventually be 80 missionaries. These missionaries establish congregations in Ohio, Michigan, and Indiana.
- 1844
  - Der Lutheraner, with Walther as editor, is first published.
- 1845
  - Löhe sends colonists to Saginaw County, Michigan, to work to convert the Native Americans there.
- 1846
  - Löhe sends 11 theological students and an instructor to Fort Wayne, Indiana, to establish the German Theological Seminary, subsequently renamed to Concordia Theological Seminary.
  - May: Planning meeting for a new Lutheran denomination is held in St. Louis.
  - July: Second planning meeting is held in Fort Wayne.
- 1847
  - April 26 – May 6: Twelve pastors representing 14 congregations meet at German Evangelical Lutheran Church (First St. Paul's) in Chicago and form the German Evangelical Lutheran Synod of Missouri, Ohio and Other States (Die Deutsche Evangelisch-Lutherische Synode von Missouri, Ohio und andern Staaten) with C. F. W. Walther as the first president.
  - Kirchen-Gesangbuch für Evangelish-Lutherische Gemeinden ungeänderter Augsburgischer Confession (Church Hymn Book for Evangelical Lutheran Congregations of the Unaltered Augsburg Conession), is published by Walther's congregation, Trinity, in St. Louis. The synod assumes responsibility for publishing it in 1861.
  - Löhe gives Concordia Theological Seminary to the synod despite differences on the doctrine of the ministry.
  - December: The Altenburg Seminary relocates from Perry County to St. Louis.
- 1848
  - June 21 – July 1: Second synodical convention meets at Trinity Lutheran Church in St. Louis.
- 1849
  - June 6–16: Third synodical convention meets at St. Paul's Lutheran Church in Fort Wayne.
- 1850
  - October 2–12: Fourth synodical convention meets at Trinity Lutheran Church in St. Louis and elects Friedrich Conrad Dietrich Wyneken as the second president of the LCMS.
  - The synod assumes control of the seminary as it moves into newly built quarters on South Jefferson Avenue and begins treating Concordia College and Concordia Seminary as separate institutions.
- 1851
  - June 18–28: Fifth synodical convention meets at Trinity Lutheran Church in Milwaukee.
- 1852
  - June 23 – July 3: Sixth synodical convention meets at St. Paul's Lutheran Church in Fort Wayne.
- 1853
  - June 1–11: Seventh synodical convention meets at Zion Lutheran Church in Cleveland, Ohio.
  - Disagreements on the doctrines of church and ministry, as well the ownership of the teachers college his missionaries had established in Saginaw, Michigan, cause Löhe to break relations with the synod.
- 1854
  - June 21 – July 1: Eighth synodical convention meets at Immanuel Lutheran Church in St. Louis and, due to rapid growth, splits the synod into four administrative district synods (Central, Eastern, Northern, and Western) and decides to hold synodical conventions every three years.
- 1855
  - January: The congregations and pastors of St. Stephen's (Walker Point), Trinity, and St. John's open a teachers seminary in Milwaukee, Wisconsin.
  - Lehre und Wehre, with Walther as editor, is first published.
- 1857
  - October 14–24: Ninth synodical convention meets at St. Paul's Lutheran Church in Fort Wayne.
  - Altar and pulpit fellowship with the Synod of the Norwegian Evangelical Lutheran Church in America (Norwegian Synod) is recognized.
  - The synod assumes control of the Milwaukee teachers seminary and moves it to Fort Wayne.
- 1859
  - Disagreements about ordination and the office of the ministry cause the Buffalo Synod to excommunicate the Missouri Synod.
- 1860
  - October 10–20: Tenth synodical convention meets at Trinity Lutheran Church in St. Louis.
- 1861
  - Concordia Theological Seminary relocates from Fort Wayne to share the campus of Concordia Seminary in St. Louis so that its students would not be subject to the draft for military service in Indiana. Concordia College relocates from St. Louis to Fort Wayne to use the facilities there.
- 1863
  - June 1–11: 11th synodical convention meets at St. Paul's Lutheran Church in Fort Wayne.
- 1864
  - October 19–29: 12th synodical convention meets at St. Paul's Lutheran Church in Fort Wayne and elects C. F. W. Walther as the third president of the LCMS.
  - After being housed in several different locations in Fort Wayne, the teachers seminary relocates to Addison, Illinois, as the Addison Teachers Seminary.
- 1866
  - October 31 – November 10: 13th synodical convention meets at Trinity Lutheran Church in St. Louis.
  - Schism within the Buffalo Synod leads to a majority of its pastors (12) joining the Missouri Synod.
- 1868
  - Altar and pulpit fellowship with the Evangelical Lutheran Joint Synod of Ohio (Ohio Synod) is recognized.
- 1869
  - September 1–11: 14th synodical convention meets at St. Paul's Lutheran Church in Fort Wayne.
  - Concordia Publishing House is established in St. Louis.
  - Altar and pulpit fellowship with the German Evangelical Lutheran Synod of Wisconsin (Wisconsin Synod) is recognized.
- 1872
  - April 26 – May 7: 15th synodical convention meets at Trinity Lutheran Church in St. Louis.
  - July 10–16: The Evangelical Lutheran Synodical Conference of North America is formed with the Illinois, Minnesota, Missouri, Norwegian, Ohio, and Wisconsin synods agreeing to be in full altar and pulpit fellowship.
  - A free conference at Gravelton, Missouri, of representatives of the Missouri, Tennessee, Holston, and Norwegian synods leads to the formation of the English Evangelical Lutheran Conference of Missouri.
  - The synod has 543 congregations and 415 pastors.
- 1874
  - October 14–23: 16th synodical convention meets at St. Paul's Lutheran Church in Fort Wayne.
  - The Northwestern District is separated from the Northern District.
- 1875
  - The Illinois District is separated from the Western District.
  - Concordia Theological Seminary moves from St. Louis to the former campus of Illinois State University in Springfield, Illinois.
- 1877
  - Mission work among Black people in the U.S. is begun by the Synodical Conference with J. F. Doeschler as the first missionary.
- 1878
  - May 15–25: 17th synodical conference meets as Trinity Lutheran Church in St. Louis and elects Heinrich Christian Schwan as the fourth president of the LCMS.
  - Iowa District is separated from the Western District, and the Canada District from the Northern District.
  - Members of the Tennessee Synod establish Concordia College in Conover, North Carolina, as a high school and add college courses in 1881.
- 1880
  - May: The Illinois Synod merges into the LCMS Illinois District.
  - Concordia Publishing House begins publishing the 22-volume Dr. Martin Luthers Sämmtliche Schriften (Dr. Martin Luther's Complete Writings) in German. Known as the "St. Louis Edition", the final volume is issued in 1910.
- 1881
  - May 11–21: 18th synodical convention meets at St. Paul's Lutheran Church in Fort Wayne.
  - The Ohio Synod withdraws from the Synodical Conference and from fellowship with the LCMS as a result of the Predestinarian Controversy.
  - September: The Illinois, the Wisconsin, and the Minnesota and Dakota districts open Concordia College in Milwaukee to give pre-seminary training to prospective pastors.
  - The Lutheran Church of St. Matthew in Manhattan, New York, establishes Concordia Progymnasium as a feeder school for Concordia Seminary.
- 1882
  - May 21: Pastor Charles Frank of Zanesville, Ohio, with the financial support of the Cleveland (Ohio) District Pastoral Conference, publishes the first issue of The Lutheran Witness.
  - The Minnesota and Dakota District and the Wisconsin District are separated from the Northern District (which is then renamed as the Michigan District), and the Nebraska District and the Southern District are separated from the Western District.
- 1883
  - The Norwegian Synod withdraws from the Synodical Conference as the Predestinarian Controversy threatens to split it internally.
  - St. Paul's Lutheran Church in Concordia, Missouri, opens St. Paul's College, initially as a high school.
- 1884
  - May 7–17: 19th synodical convention meets in the Concordia Seminary Aula in St. Louis.
- 1886
  - The Evangelical Lutheran Concordia Synod of Pennsylvania and Other States, which had split from the Ohio Synod in the aftermath of the Predestinarian Controversy and joined the Synodical Conference in 1882, merges into the LCMS.
- 1887
  - May 4–14: 20th synodical convention meets at St. Paul's Lutheran Church in Fort Wayne.
  - The Kansas District and the California and Oregon District are separated from the Western District.
  - Concordia College in Milwaukee is transferred from the founding districts to the synod itself.
- 1888
  - The English Evangelical Lutheran Conference of Missouri is reorganized as an independent body, the English Evangelical Lutheran Synod of Missouri and Other States (English Synod).
  - The English Synod assumes responsibility for publishing The Lutheran Witness.
- 1889
  - The English Synod publishes the Evangelical Lutheran Hymn Book that had been compiled by August Crull of Concordia College in Fort Wayne, Indiana.
- 1890
  - June 25 – July 3: 21st synodical convention meets at Trinity Lutheran Church in Milwaukee.
  - The English Synod joins the Synodical Conference.
- 1892
  - The English Synod takes control of Concordia College in Conover.
- 1893
  - February: Concordia Progymnasium purchases land in Unionville, New York, for a new campus.
  - April 25 – May 6: 22nd synodical convention meets at Holy Cross Lutheran Church in St. Louis.
  - May 23: The Walther League is organized at Trinity Lutheran Church in Buffalo, New York, for young people in the Synodical Conference.
  - September: St. John's College opens in Winfield, Kansas. Consisting of a high school academy and a junior college, it is operated by the English Synod.
- 1894
  - June 2: The LCMS files incorporation papers as the result of financial embezzlement at Concordia Publishing House.
  - November 18: The Evangelical Lutheran School Teachers Seminary (evangelische-lutherische Schullehrer-Seminar) is dedicated in Seward, Nebraska, becoming the synod's second such school.
- 1896
  - April 29 – May 9: 23rd synodical convention meets at St. Paul's Lutheran Church and Immanuel Lutheran Church in Fort Wayne.
  - St. Paul's Lutheran Church in Concordia, Missouri, gives St. John's College to the synod.
  - Mission work begins in England, organized as the Evangelical Lutheran Church of England in 1954.
- 1897
  - The synod has 1,564 congregations, 1,986 pastors, and 687,334 members.
- 1899
  - April 26 – May 6: 24th synodical convention meets at Holy Cross Lutheran Church in St. Louis and elects Franz August Otto Pieper as the fifth president of the LCMS.
  - The California and Oregon District is split into the California and Nevada District and the Oregon and Washington District.

== 20th century ==
- 1900
  - Missionary work among German-speaking immigrants in Brazil begins.
- 1902
  - June 4–14: 25th synodical convention meets at Trinity Lutheran Church in Milwaukee.
  - September 2–4: Slovak Evangelical Lutheran Synod is organized; it establishes altar and pulpit fellowship with the LCMS in 1903.
  - A church extension fund for the synod is started.
- 1903
  - March 2: The Synodical Conference opens Immanuel Lutheran College in Concord, North Carolina, to train Black pastors and teachers. It relocates to Greensboro, North Carolina in 1905.
  - September: The Synodical Conference opens Luther College in New Orleans, Louisiana.
  - Seminario Concordia opens in the town of Bom Jesus in São Lourenço do Sul, Brazil.
- 1904
  - Brazil District is established.
- 1905
  - June 21 – July 1: 26th synodical convention meets at Immanuel Lutheran Church in Detroit, Michigan.
  - Missionary work in Argentina begins as part of the Brazil District.
  - Concordia College opens in Portland, Oregon, as a high school for students preparing to become Lutheran pastors and teachers.
- 1906
  - The South Dakota District is separated from the Minnesota and Dakota District, and the Texas District from the Southern District.
  - St. Paul's College in Concordia adds its junior college program.
  - September: The California and Nevada District opens California Concordia College in Oakland, California, as a high school.
- 1907
  - The Atlantic District is separated from the Eastern District.
- 1908
  - May 13–23: 27th synodical convention meets at St. Paul's Lutheran Church in Fort Wayne.
  - The Slovak Evangelical Lutheran Synod joins the Synodical Conference.
- 1909
  - The Illinois District is divided into the Northern Illinois, Central Illinois, and Southern Illinois districts.
- 1910
  - January 4: Concordia Progymnasium begins classes at its new Bronxville, New York, campus.
  - The North Dakota and Montana District is separated from the Minnesota and Dakota District.
- 1911
  - May 10–20: 28th synodical convention meets at Holy Cross Lutheran Church in St. Louis and elects Friedrich Pfotenhauer as the sixth president of the LCMS.
  - The office of synod president is made a full-time position.
  - The English Synod merges into the LCMS as the English District, bringing with it Concordia College in Conover and St. John's College in Winfield.
  - The LCMS assumes responsibility for publishing The Lutheran Witness.
- 1912
  - The Minnesota and Dakota District is renamed as the Minnesota District.
  - Concordia Publishing House issues the Evangelical Lutheran Hymn-Book, a revision of the Evangelical Lutheran Hymn Book of 1889.
  - Mission work begins on the Isle of Pines, Cuba.
- 1913
  - October 12: Addison Teachers Seminary relocates from Addison to River Forest, Illinois, and is renamed Concordia Teachers College.
  - Medical mission work begins in India.
  - E. L. Arndt begins mission work in China.
- 1914
  - May 6–16: 29th synodical convention meets at St. Luke's Lutheran Church in Chicago.
- 1916
  - The Wisconsin District is split into the North Wisconsin and South Wisconsin districts.
- 1917
  - June 20–29: 30th synodical convention meets at Plankinton Hall in Milwaukee.
  - A new constitution is adopted.
  - The synod drops the word German from its name to become the Evangelical Lutheran Synod of Missouri, Ohio, and other States.
  - Twelve laymen attending the convention form the Lutheran Laymen's League to raise funds to pay off the synod's $100,000 debt. The league later raise $2.7 million for a pension fund for pastors and teachers.
  - The synod takes over the work of the China Mission Society.
- 1918
  - Concordia Progymnasium in Bronxville changes its name to Concordia Collegiate Institute.
  - California Concordia College adds junior college classes.
- 1919
  - The Lutheran Deaconess Association is organized.
- 1920
  - June 16–25: 31st synodical convention meets at Harmonie Hall in Detroit.
- 1921
  - The Colorado District is separated from the Kansas District, and the Alberta and British Columbia District and the Manitoba and Saskatchewan District are separated from the Minnesota District.
  - The California and Nevada District gives control of California Concordia College to the synod.
- 1922
  - The Nebraska District is split into the Northern Nebraska and the Southern Nebraska districts.
  - The Synodical Conference opens Alabama Luther College in Selma, Alabama.
  - The synod has 3,073 pastors and 1,041,514 members.
- 1923
  - June 20–29: 32nd synodical convention meets at the Concordia College chapel in Fort Wayne.
  - September 13: Concordia College in St. Paul, Minnesota, opens with its first class of high school freshmen.
- 1924
  - October 26: The synod's radio station, KFUO (AM), begins broadcasting from the campus of Concordia Seminary in St. Louis.
  - The Evangelical Lutheran School Teachers Seminary in Seward is renamed as Concordia Teachers College.
  - The Lutheran University Association acquires Valparaiso University in Valparaiso, Indiana.
  - The Oklahoma District is separated from the Kansas District, and the Canada District is renamed as the Ontario District.
- 1925
  - The Synodical Conference closes Luther College in New Orleans and redirects its support to Alabama Luther College.
- 1926
  - June 9–18: 33rd synodical convention meets at Holy Cross Lutheran Church in St. Louis.
  - Concordia Seminary moves to its current campus in the St. Louis suburb of Clayton.
  - Lutheran Concordia College of Texas opens as a four-year high school in Austin, Texas, to prepare young men for the seminary.
- 1927
  - The Argentina District is separated from the Brazil District.
  - The Concordia Historical Institute is established.
- 1929
  - June 19–28: 34th synodical convention meets in the Concordia Teachers College auditorium in River Forest.
  - The Chicago Theses, formulated during merger discussions with the Ohio, Iowa, and Buffalo synods, are rejected by the convention of the LCMS.
- 1930
  - The Southern California District is separated from the California and Nevada District.
  - August 11: The Ohio, Iowa, and Buffalo synods merge to form the American Lutheran Church (ALC).
  - October 2: The Lutheran Hour radio program is first aired.
- 1932
  - June 15–24: 35th synodical convention meets in the Concordia College auditorium in Milwaukee.
  - The Brief Statement of the Doctrinal Position of the Missouri Synod is adopted by the convention.
  - The Thiensville Theses are accepted by the faculties of Concordia Seminary and the Wisconsin Synod's Wisconsin Lutheran Seminary.
- 1934
  - Gamma Delta is founded in Chicago as an international association of Lutheran students.
- 1935
  - April 16: A fire destroys the main building of Concordia College in Conover, leading to the closure of the school.
  - June 19–28: 36th synodical convention meets in the Cleveland Public Auditorium Convention Hall in Cleveland and elects John William Behnken as the seventh president of the LCMS.
  - September: The non-seminary track high school courses at Concordia College in Fort Wayne are split off and merged with that city's Luther Institute to form what is now Concordia Lutheran High School.
  - The synod has 4,224 congregations, 3,605 pastors, and 1,230,705 members.
- 1936
  - The Iowa District is split into the Iowa East and Iowa West districts.
  - Mission work begins in Nigeria which eventually becomes the Lutheran Church of Nigeria.
- 1937
  - Concordia Publishing House begins publishing a monthly devotional booklet that, in 1948, is renamed Portals of Prayer.
- 1938
  - June 15–24: 37th synodical convention meets at the St. Louis Municipal Auditorium with the theme "Jubilee Convention".
  - The LCMS and the ALC agree on the Brief Statement and the ALC's Declaration, but no further action on a merger results.
- 1939
  - The Southeastern District is formed from parts of the Eastern and English districts.
- 1940
  - Mission work begins in Mexico.
- 1941
  - June 18–27: 38th synodical convention meets in the Concordia College gymnasium in Fort Wayne with the theme 'Wyneken Memorial Convention".
  - The Lutheran Hymnal is published by Concordia Publishing House under the authority of the Synodical Conference.
- 1942
  - July 7–8: The Lutheran Women's Missionary League is established as an official auxiliary of the synod at a meeting at St. Stephan's Lutheran Church in Chicago. The formation of district and regional grouping of congregational women's societies starting in the 1920s had led the synod 1941 convention to urge its creation.
  - The Walther League Building, paid for by the League itself, opens in Chicago.
  - The Lutheran Education Association is organized.
- 1944
  - June 21–29: 39th synodical convention meets at the Arthur Hill High School auditorium in Saginaw, Michigan with the theme "Franconian Centennial Convention".
- 1945
  - The North Dakota and Montana District is split into the North Dakota District and the Montana District.
  - A Statement of the Forty-four is issued by 44 theologians and leaders criticizing the synod's approach toward other Lutheran church bodies, provoking immediate response for others in the synod.
- 1946
  - July 6: Mission work begins in the Philippines.
- 1947
  - July 20–29: 40th synodical convention meets at the Palmer House Grand Ballroom in Chicago with the theme "Centennial Convention".
  - The convention adopts a shorter name: The Lutheran Church – Missouri Synod.
  - Mission work begins in Guatemala, later organized as the Lutheran Church of Guatemala.
- 1948
  - May 17: As directed by the 1947 convention, the Committee on Doctrinal Unity first meets with the Fellowship Commission of the ALC to develop a set of doctrinal theses.
  - The Florida–Georgia District is separated from the Southern District.
  - The Oregon and Washington District is renamed as the Northwest District.
  - Mission work begins in Japan and New Guinea.
- 1949
  - December 5–6: Common Confession, Part I, is unanimously approved by a joint meeting of the Committee on Doctrinal Unity and the ALC's Fellowship Commission, with work to continue on additional topics for Part II.
  - Mission work begins in Hong Kong, eventually becoming the Lutheran Church-Hong Kong Synod.
- 1950
  - June 21–30: 41st synodical convention meets at the Concordia College gymnasium in Milwaukee.
  - Common Confession, Part I is accepted by both the LCMS and the ALC.
  - Concordia College in Portland adds a junior college program for men.
  - The synod has 4,430 congregations, 4,621 pastors, and 1,674,901 members.
- 1951
  - The Orthodox Lutheran Conference is formed by a small number of congregations leaving the LCMS primarily because they see the breaking of an engagement (in the modern sense) as being the same as the breaking of a betrothal (historically) and therefore a sin.
  - Lutheran Concordia College of Texas adds a junior college program.
  - Mission work begins in Venezuela and Taiwan. The missions in Venezuela eventually become the Lutheran Church of Venezuela.
- 1952
  - September: This is the Life television drama series first airs and runs until 1988.
  - National Parent-Teacher League is organized as a Lutheran counterpart to the National Parent Teacher Association.
- 1953
  - February 9: The joint meeting of the LCMS Committee on Doctrinal Unity and the ALC Fellowship Commission unanimously approves Part 2 of the Common Confession.
  - June 17–26: 42nd synodical convention meets at the Music Hall in Houston, Texas.
  - The LCMS receives a construction permit from the FCC to build KFUO-TV (channel 30) in St. Louis, but surrenders the permit in February 1956 before beginning construction after deciding that a UHF station would not be viable.
- 1954
  - The ALC accepts the Common Confession, Part 2.
- 1955
  - The Evangelical Lutheran Synod (ELS) breaks fellowship with the LCMS due to the latter's growing relationship to the ALC.
  - Concordia Publishing House begins the publication of Volumes 1–30 of Luther's Works: The American Edition, finishing in 1976.
  - Lutheran Concordia College of Texas changes its name to Concordia Lutheran College.
- 1956
  - June 20–29: 43rd synodical convention meets at the St. Paul Auditorium in St. Paul.
  - LCMS convention recognizes Parts 1 and 2 together of the Common Confession as a single document that is in harmony with Scriptures and the Lutheran Confessions, but not as a basis for altar and pulpit fellowship with other churches.
- 1957
  - The Wisconsin Evangelical Lutheran Synod (WELS) publicly admonishes the LCMS regarding differences in the practice of church fellowship.
  - June 12: Concordia College in Fort Wayne closes.
  - September: Concordia Senior College opens in Fort Wayne on a campus designed by Eero Saarinen.
- 1958
  - December 8: The LCMS Foundation is established to receive gifts of property and other non-cash assets on behalf of the LCMS.
  - Mission work begins in South Korea.
- 1959
  - June 17–26; 44th synodical convention meets at the Civic Auditorium in San Francisco, California, with the theme "Share His Glory".
  - The synod convention establishes altar and pulpit fellowship with the India Evangelical Lutheran Church.
- 1960
  - April 22–24: The American Lutheran Church (ALC) is formed by the merger of the first American Lutheran Church, the Evangelical Lutheran Church, the United Evangelical Lutheran Church, and later, the Lutheran Free Church.
  - Fellowship with the Evangelical Lutheran Church of Chile (now known as the Confessional Lutheran Church of Chile) is recognized.
  - The Slovak Evangelical Lutheran Church changes its name to Synod of Evangelical Lutheran Churches as the use of the Slovak language is not longer prevalent in its congregations.
  - The synod has 5,215 congregations, 5,506 pastors, and 2,391,195 members.
- 1961
  - The WELS breaks fellowship with the LCMS.
  - June 30: Immanuel Lutheran College is closed by the Synodical Conference, with Black students going to LCMS institutions thereafter.
- 1962
  - June 20–9: 45th synodical convention meets at the Cleveland Public Auditorium with the theme "Stand Fast, but Do Not Stand Still" and elects Oliver Raymond Harms as the eighth president of the LCMS.
  - June 28 – July 1: The Lutheran Church in America (LCA) is formed in Detroit by the merger of the United Lutheran Church in America, the Finnish Evangelical Lutheran Church of America, the American Evangelical Lutheran Church, and the Augustana Evangelical Lutheran Church. The LCA is fully operational on January 1, 1963.
- 1963
  - Both the ELS and the WELS withdraw from the Synodical Conference, leaving only the LCMS and the Synod of Evangelical Lutheran Churches (SELC) as members.
  - The Central District is split into the Indiana and Ohio districts, and the Minnesota District into the Minnesota North and Minnesota South districts.
  - The Lutheran Church in Nigeria becomes a partner church with altar and pulpit fellowship.
- 1964
  - January 1: The National Evangelical Lutheran Church, of FInnish-American origins, merges into the LCMS.
  - April 28–29: About a dozen congregations leave the LCMS due to lack of action taken by the 1962 convention against the changes being made in the synod's doctrine and form the Lutheran Churches of the Reformation.
  - September: Concordia Lutheran Junior College opens in Ann Arbor, Michigan.
- 1965
  - June 16–25: 46th synodical convention meets at Cobo Hall in Detroit with the theme "Even So I Send You".
- 1966
  - The Inter-Lutheran Commission on Worship is formed with the American Lutheran Church and the Lutheran Church in America to create a new hymnal for use by most Lutherans in North America.
  - Mission work in Taiwan becomes the independent China Evangelical Lutheran Church in fellowship with the LCMS.
- 1967
  - January 1: The LCMS agrees with the second American Lutheran Church and the Lutheran Church in America to form the Lutheran Council in the United States of America (LCUSA).
  - July 7–14: 47th synodical convention meets at the New York Hilton Hotel in New York City with the theme "Justified by Grace".
  - The Synodical Conference is officially dissolved.
- 1968
  - Concordia High School, the high school department of Concordia College, St. Paul, separates from the college and merges with St. Paul Lutheran High School to form Concordia Academy.
  - The Lutheran Synod of Mexico becomes a partner church in altar and pulpit fellowship.
- 1969
  - May: John Tietjen is chosen to be the next president of Concordia Seminary.
  - July 11–18: 48th synodical convention meets at the Currigan Exhibition Hall in Denver, Colorado, with the theme "The Edifying Work" and elects J. A. O. Preus II as the ninth president of the LCMS.
  - The convention establishes altar and pulpit fellowship with the second American Lutheran Church.
  - Concordia Publishing House issues the Worship Supplement to The Lutheran Hymnal.
  - Concordia Collegiate Institute closes its preparatory high school and changes its name to Concordia College.
- 1970
  - The Wyoming District is separated from the Northern Nebraska District, and the Northern Nebraska and Southern Nebraska districts are merged to form a new Nebraska District.
  - Mission work begins in Togo that eventually becomes the Lutheran Church of Togo.
  - The synod has 5,690 congregations, 6,866 pastors, and 2,788,536 members.
- 1971
  - The SELC merges with the LCMS as the latter's SELC District.
  - June 15: The Fact Finding Committee appointed by Preus in 1970 to examine the doctrine being taught at Concordia Seminary delivers its report to him. It is subsequently presented to the seminary's Board of Control.
  - July 9–16: 49th synodical convention meets at the Milwaukee Arena in Milwaukee with the theme "Sent to Reconcile".
  - November 1–2: Six congregations leave the LCMS due to dissatisfaction with the methods with which liberal theology is being handled, forming the Federation for Authentic Lutheranism.
  - The New England District and the New Jersey District are separated from the Atlantic District.'
  - The high school academy of St. John's College in Winfield closes to concentrate resources on the junior college.
  - Altar and pulpit fellowship with the Evangelical Lutheran Church of Ghana is recognized.
  - Mission congregations in Japan, Papua New Guinea, the Philippines, and South Korea become the independent Japan Lutheran Church, Gutnius Lutheran Church, Lutheran Church in the Philippines, and Lutheran Church in Korea, respectively, in fellowship with the LCMS.
- 1972
  - September: President Preus mails his report on the results of the Fact Finding Committee, known as the Blue Book, to all congregations and pastors in the synod.
- 1973
  - January: The Concordia Seminary Board of Control rejects the conclusions of the Blue Book and instead, commends all the faculty members as faithful to Scripture and the Lutheran confessions.
  - June: California Concordia College closes.
  - July 6–13: the 50th synodical convention meets at the Rivergate Convention Center in New Orleans, Louisiana, with the theme "Ever Only All for Thee".
  - The convention condemns the teaching of the faculty majority at Concordia Seminary and elects more conservative members to the Board of Control.
  - August: Supporters of the seminary faculty majority form Evangelical Lutherans in Mission (ELIM) to support them.
  - August: The Board of Control suspends Tietjen. The suspension is then vacated while efforts are made to resolve the issues, but is reissued on January 20, 1974.
- 1974
  - February 19: Most of the faculty and students of Concordia Seminary stage a walkout to protest Tietjen's suspension, with classes for Seminex (Concordia Seminary in Exile) beginning the next day at facilities provided by Eden Seminary and Saint Louis University.
- 1975
  - July 4–11: 51st synodical convention meets at the Anaheim Convention Center in Anaheim, California, with the theme "Jesus Christ Is Lord".
- 1976
  - About 250 congregations (with 100,000 members) supporting Seminex leave the LCMS to form the Association of Evangelical Lutheran Churches (AELC).
  - Concordia Theological Seminary relocates to the campus of Concordia Senior College in Fort Wayne.
  - Concordia Lutheran Theological Seminary in St. Catharines, Ontario, opens as an extension site of Concordia Theological Seminary.
  - Concordia Lutheran Junior College begins offering four-year degree programs and changes its name to Concordia College Ann Arbor.
  - Christ College Irvine opens in Irvine, California.
- 1977
  - July 15–22: 52nd synodical convention meets at the Dallas Convention Center in Dallas, Texas, with the theme "That We May Grow".
  - The LCMS convention declares a state of protest in the fellowship agreement with the ALC as the ALC moves to establish closer ties to the LCA.
  - Synod president Preus removes four LCMS district presidents from office because they allowed graduates of Seminex to be assigned as pastors in their districts in violation of the LCMS bylaws.
  - The California and Nevada District is renamed as the California–Nevada–Hawaii District.
  - Concordia College in Portland becomes a four-year college.
  - Concordia Senior College ceases operations.
  - The Lutheran Church-Hong Kong Synod becomes a partner church with altar and pulpit fellowship.
- 1978
  - June 15: The Lutheran Church Extension Fund is incorporated as the continuation of the Church Extension Fund of 1902, eventually also encompassing most of the individual district extension funds.
  - The Lutheran Book of Worship, developed by the Inter-Lutheran Commission on Worship, is published, but the LCMS declines to authorize it for use in its congregations.
  - Mission work begins in Haiti.
- 1979
  - July 6–12: 53rd synodical convention meets at the Alfonso J. Cervantes Convention Center in St. Louis with the theme "God Opens Doors...".
  - Concordia Teachers College in River Forest changes its name to Concordia College as it expands its course offerings.
- 1980
  - The Brazil District becomes the independent Evangelical Lutheran Church of Brazil.
  - Concordia Lutheran College in Austin closes its high school program and becomes a four-year college.
  - First LCMS Lutheran Youth Gathering is held in Fort Collins, Colorado, with the theme "Rejoice in His Presence".
  - The synod has 5,694 congregations, 7,926 pastors, and 2,625,650 members.
- 1981
  - January 10: The Saxon Lutheran Memorial in Frohna, Missouri, is added to the National Register of Historic Places.
  - July 1: Alabama Lutheran Academy and College (formerly Alabama Luther College) changes its name to Concordia College Alabama.
  - July 3–10: 54th synodical convention meets at the Alfonso J. Cervantes Convention Center in St. Louis with the theme "Forward in Remembrance" and elects Ralph Arthur Bohlmann as the tenth president of the LCMS.
  - The LCMS convention breaks fellowship with the ALC.
- 1982
  - Lutheran Worship, a revision of the Lutheran Book of Worship, is published by Concordia Publishing House.
  - The LCMS purchases the former campus of the School Sisters of Notre Dame in Mequon, Wisconsin, and relocates Concordia College Milwaukee there.
- 1983
  - July 8–15: 55th synodical convention meets at the Alfonso J. Cervantes Convention Center in St. Louis with the theme "Him We Proclaim".
  - The Colorado District is renamed as the Rocky Mountain District.
  - The LCMS International Center in Kirkwood, Missouri, is dedicated.
  - Second LCMS Lutheran Youth Gathering is held in San Antonio, Texas, with the theme "Amigos de Cristo".
  - Concordia Lutheran Theological Seminary moves to the campus of Brock University.
- 1984
  - September 10: Concordia Lutheran Seminary opens in Edmonton, Alberta.
- 1986
  - July 18–25: 56th synodical convention meets at the Indiana Convention Center in Indianapolis, Indiana, with the theme "Alive in Christ".
  - St. John's College in Winfield closes at the end of the spring semester.
  - St. Paul's College in Concordia closes at the end of the spring semester, but the high school continues to operate as St. Paul Lutheran High School, the only residential high school owned by the LCMS.
  - Third LCMS Lutheran Youth Gathering is held in Washington, D.C., with the theme "On Wings Like Eagles".
- 1987
  - April 30 – May 3: The ALC, AELC, and LCA meet in Columbus, Ohio, to form the Evangelical Lutheran Church in America (ELCA), effective January 1, 1988.
  - LCUSA is dissolved upon the formation of the ELCA.
- 1988
  - The Argentina District becomes the independent Evangelical Lutheran Church of Argentina.
  - The Alberta and British Columbia, the Manitoba and Saskatchewan, and the Ontario districts become the independent Lutheran Church-Canada. Concordia Lutheran Seminary and Concordia Lutheran Theological Seminary are transferred to the new church body.
- 1989
  - July 7–14: 57th synodical convention meets at the Century II Convention Center in Wichita, Kansas, with the theme "Tell Everyone What HE Has Done".
  - The Southern California District is renamed as the Pacific Southwest District.
  - The LCMS is given radio station KICX-AM in McCook, Nebraska, and changes its call sign to KNGN in April 1990. The station airs much of the KFUO programming, but the synod turns it over to local operators in 2001 due to the cost of running it.
  - The Walther League is officially disbanded.
  - Fourth LCMS Lutheran Youth Gathering is held in Denver, Colorado, with the theme "Blessed in the Journey".
- 1990
  - Concordia College in Mequon changes its name to Concordia University Wisconsin to reflect its advanced degree programs.
  - Concordia College in River Forest changes its name to Concordia University to reflect its advanced degree programs.
  - The synod has 5,296 congregations, 8,301 pastors, and 2,602,849 members.
- 1992
  - July 10–17: 58th synodical convention meets at the David Lawrence Convention Center in Pittsburgh, Pennsylvania, with the theme "With Great Boldness...Tell Everyone What He Has Done!" and elects Alvin L. Barry as the 11th president of the LCMS.
  - The Lutheran Laymen's League changes its name to Lutheran Hour Ministries.
  - Fifth LCMS Lutheran Youth Gathering is held in New Orleans, Louisiana, with the theme "Time for Joy".
- 1993
  - Christ College Irvine changes its name to Concordia University Irvine to reflect its advanced degree programs and its membership in the Concordia University System.
- 1995
  - July 15–21: 59th synodical convention meets at the America's Center Convention Complex in St. Louis with the theme "Sent Forth by God's Blessing".
  - Concordia College in Austin changes its name to Concordia University at Austin to reflect its advanced degree programs.
  - Concordia College in Portland changes its name to Concordia University, Portland, to reflect its advanced degree programs.
  - Altar and pulpit fellowship with the Free Evangelical Lutheran Synod in South Africa is recognized.
  - Sixth LCMS Lutheran Youth Gathering is held in San Antonio, Texas, with the theme "River of Light".
- 1997
  - Concordia College in St. Paul changes its name to Concordia University, St. Paul, to reflect its advanced degree programs.
- 1998
  - April 14: In the case Lutheran Church–Missouri Synod v. FCC, the United States Court of Appeals for the District of Columbia Circuit rules that the FCC's Equal Employment Opportunity program requirements are unconstitutional, reversing the $50,000 forfeiture which had been levied against the synod's radio station, KFUO, for not meeting affirmative action requirements.
  - July 11–17: 60th synodical convention meets at the America's Center Convention Complex in St. Louis with the theme "To the Ends of the Earth".
  - July 25–29: Seventh LCMS Lutheran Youth Gathering is held in Atlanta, Georgia, with the theme "Called to Be".
  - Hymnal Supplement 98, a supplement to Lutheran Worship, is published.
  - Concordia Teachers College in Seward changes its name to Concordia University Nebraska to reflect its advanced degree programs.

== 21st century ==
- 2000
  - The synod has 6,150 congregations, 8,257 pastors, and 2,554,088 members.
- 2001
  - March 23: Robert T. Kuhn becomes the 12th president of the LCMS upon the death in office of Alvin Barry.
  - July 14–20: 61st synodical convention meets at the America's Center Convention Complex in St. Louis with the theme "Tell the Good News about Jesus" and elects Gerald B. Kieschnick as the 13th president of the LCMS.
  - The convention recognizes altar and pulpit fellowship with the Evangelical Lutheran Church of Haiti.
  - July 28–August 1: Eighth LCMS Lutheran Youth Gathering is held in New Orleans, Louisiana, with the theme "Higher Ground".
  - Concordia College in Ann Arbor changes its name to Concordia University Ann Arbor to reflect its advanced degree programs.
- 2004
  - July 10–15: 62nd synodical convention meets at the America's Center Convention Complex in St. Louis with the theme "One Mission—Ablaze!"
  - The convention recognizes altar and pulpit fellowship with the Evangelical Lutheran Church in Kenya.
  - July 24–28: Ninth LCMS Lutheran Youth Gathering is held in Orlando, Florida, with the theme "Beyond Imagination".
- 2006
  - The Lutheran Service Book is published.
- 2007
  - July 14–19: 63rd synodical convention meets at the George R. Brown Convention Center in Houston with the theme "One Message—Christ!"
  - The convention recognizes altar and pulpit fellowship with the American Association of Lutheran Churches.
  - July 28–August 1: Tenth LCMS Lutheran Youth Gathering is held in Orlando, Florida, with the theme "Chosen".
  - Concordia University at Austin changes its name to Concordia University Texas.
- 2008
  - October 26: Concordia University Texas opens its new main campus northwest of Austin.
- 2010
  - July 10–17: 64th synodical convention meets at the George R. Brown Convention Center in Houston with the theme "One People—Forgiven" and elects Matthew C. Harrison as the 14th (and current) president of the LCMS.
  - July 17–21: 11th LCMS Lutheran Youth Gathering is held in New Orleans, Louisiana, with the theme "We Believe".
  - The synod has 6,158 congregations, 8,927 pastors, and 2,278,586 members.
- 2012
  - January 11: In Hosanna-Tabor Evangelical Lutheran Church and School v. Equal Employment Opportunity Commission, a case involving a member congregation of the LCMS, the U.S. Supreme Court unanimously rules that federal discrimination laws do not apply to religious organizations' selection of religious leaders.
  - May 10: Altar and pulpit fellowship is established with the Evangelical Lutheran Church of Liberia.
- 2013
  - July 1: Concordia University Ann Arbor merges into Concordia University Wisconsin and becomes a satellite campus.
  - July 20–25: 65th synodical convention meets at the America's Center Convention Complex in St. Louis with the theme "Baptized for this Moment".
  - The convention recognizes altar and pulpit fellowship with the Siberian Evangelical Lutheran Church and the Lutheran Church of Togo.
  - July 1–5: 12th LCMS Lutheran Youth Gathering is held in San Antonio, Texas, with the theme "Live Love(d)".
- 2016
  - July 9–14: 66th synodical convention meets at the Wisconsin Center in Milwaukee with the theme "Upon this Rock: Repent, Confess, Rejoice".
  - The convention recognizes altar and pulpit fellowship with the Lutheran Church in Norway and the Lutheran Church of Uruguay.
  - July 16–20: 13th LCMS Lutheran Youth Gathering is held in New Orleans, Louisiana, with the theme "In Christ Alone".
- 2018
  - April 25: Concordia College Alabama closes due to financial difficulties.
- 2019
  - July 20–25: 67th synodical convention meets at the Tampa Convention Center in Tampa, Florida, with the theme "Joy:Fully Lutheran : Rejoice, Pray, Give Thanks".
  - The convention recognizes altar and pulpit fellowship with the Evangelical Lutheran Church in Belgium, the Portuguese Evangelical Lutheran Church, the Confessional Lutheran Church of South Africa, and the Evangelical Lutheran Free Church in Denmark.
  - July 11–15: 14th LCMS Lutheran Youth Gathering is held in Minneapolis, Minnesota, with the theme "Real. Present. God."
- 2020
  - April 28: Concordia University, Portland, closes due to financial problems.
  - November 14: Altar and pulpit fellowship established with the Evangelical Lutheran Mission Diocese of Finland.
  - The synod has 5,976 congregations, 6,308 pastors, and 1,861,129 members.
- 2022
  - July 9–13: 15th LCMS Lutheran Youth Gathering is held in Houston, Texas, with the theme "In All Things".
- 2023
  - February 6: the LCMS buys KXFN (1380 AM) in St. Louis for $570,000 from Catholic talk radio network Relevant Radio to use as a satellite for KFUO to broadcast its programming at night.
  - July 29 – August 3: 68th synodical convention meets at the Baird Center in Milwaukee with the theme "We Preach Christ Crucified". The convention was delayed one year due to the COVID-19 pandemic.
  - The convention recognizes altar and pulpit fellowship with the Evangelical Lutheran Church of South Sudan/Sudan, the Evangelical Lutheran Mission Diocese of Finland, the Lutheran Church of Uganda, the Evangelical Lutheran Church of Ukraine, and the Ceylon Evangelical Lutheran Church. The convention also ends fellowship with the Japan Lutheran Church due to that body's acceptance of women's ordination and other issues.
- 2025
  - May 4: The LCMS recognizes altar and pulpit fellowship with the Lutheran Church of Bolivia.
  - July 19–23: 16th LCMS Lutheran Youth Gathering is held in New Orleans, Louisiana, with the theme "Endure".
