= Missouri District of the Lutheran Church – Missouri Synod =

Subdivision of Christian denomination in the U.S.

Missouri District of the LCMS

Location
- Country: United States
- Territory: Missouri
- Headquarters: St. Louis

Statistics
- Congregations: 301
- Schools: 52 preschool; 56 elementary; 9 secondary
- Members: 138,000

Information
- Denomination: Lutheran Church – Missouri Synod
- Established: 1966

Current leadership
- President: Rev. Dr. Robert Lee Hagan

Website
- www.mo.lcms.org

The Missouri District is one of the 35 districts of the Lutheran Church – Missouri Synod (LCMS), and comprises the state of Missouri. Five Missouri congregations are in the non-geographic English District, and one congregation in St. Louis is in the SELC District. The Missouri District is home to the synod's headquarters as well as Concordia Seminary, both of which are located in or just outside St. Louis. The district includes approximately 301 congregations and missions, subdivided into 28 circuits, as well as 52 preschools, 56 elementary schools, and 9 high schools. Baptized membership in district congregations is approximately 138,000. It is the third largest district of the LCMS in number of congregations (trailing the Michigan and Texas districts) and second largest in total membership (behind the Michigan District).

The Missouri District was formed in 1966 when the Western District was divided, also creating the Mid-South District. District offices are located in St. Louis. Delegates from each congregation meet in convention every three years to elect the district president, four vice presidents, district secretary, circuit counselors, a board of directors, and other officers. The Rev. Robert Lee Hagan became the district president in 2015. Concordia Lutheran Church of Frohna, Missouri, is the oldest congregation in the District, founded in 1839.

== Presidents ==
- Rev. Herman C. Scherer, 1966–1978
- Rev. Paul Ph. Spitz, 1978–1991
- Rev. James W. Kalthoff, 1991–2006
- Rev. Ray G. Mirly, 2006–2015
- Rev. Robert Lee Hagan, 2015–present

== Churches on the NRHP ==
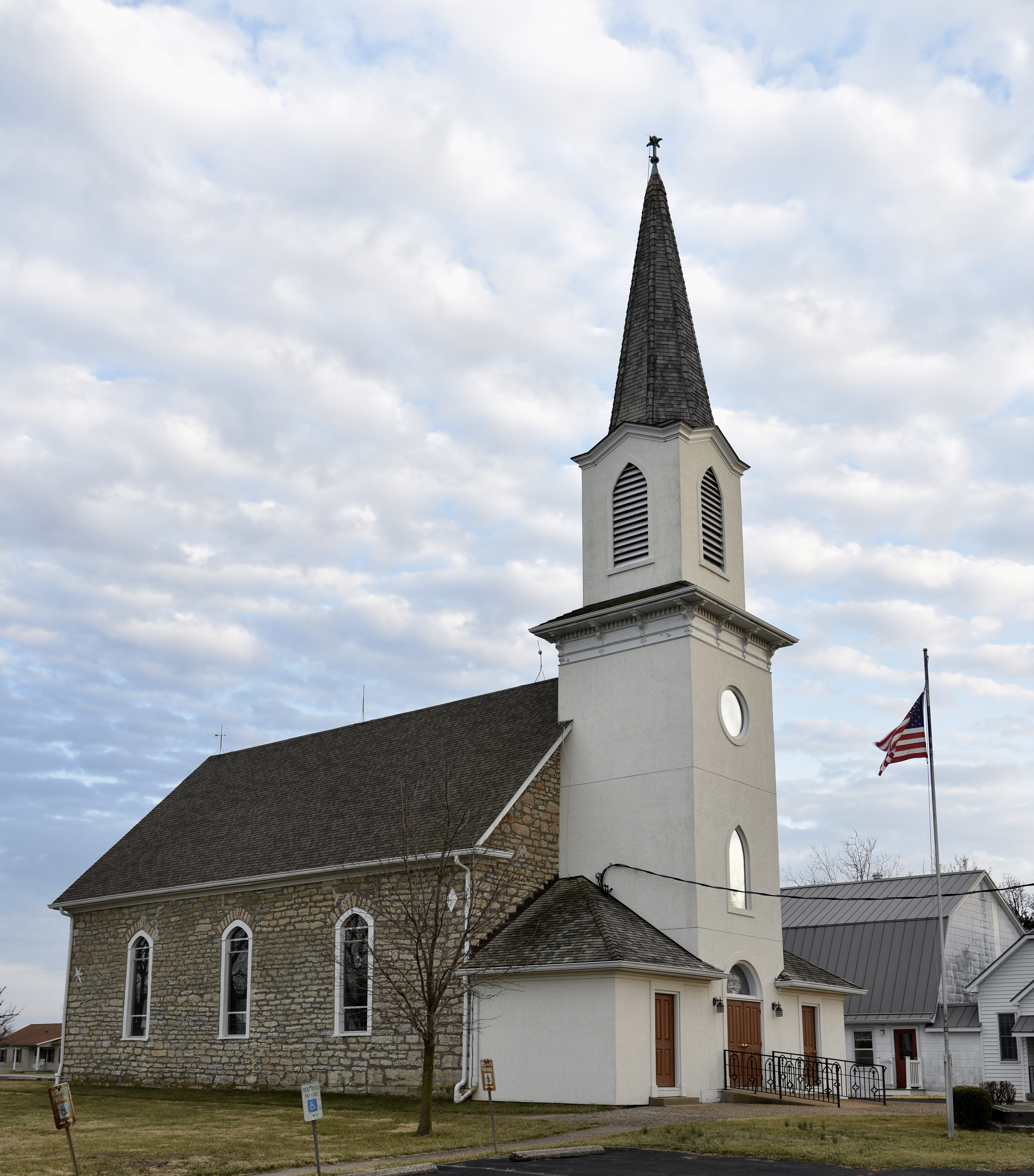
Saint Paul's Lutheran Church in New Melle, Missouri

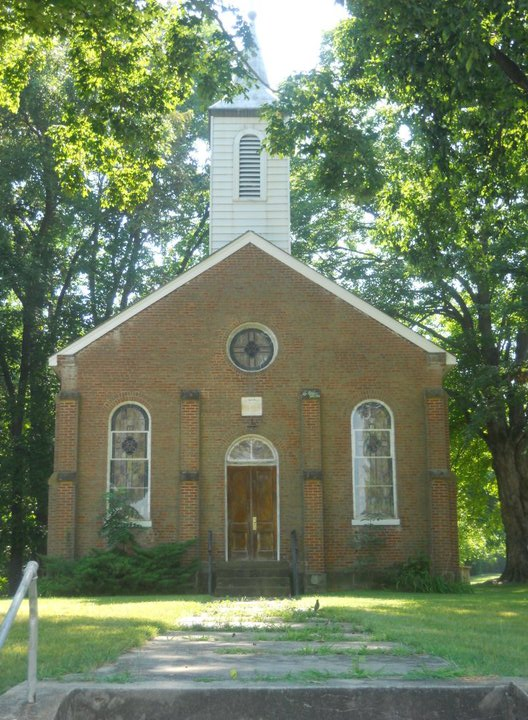
Hanover Lutheran Church in Cape Girardeau, Missouri
