= Minnesota South District of the Lutheran Church – Missouri Synod =

Subdivision of Christian denomination in the U.S.

Minnesota South District of the LCMS

Location
- Country: United States
- Territory: Southern third of Minnesota
- Headquarters: Burnsville, Minnesota

Statistics
- Congregations: 246
- Schools: 49 preschool; 45 elementary; 7 secondary
- Members: 127,000

Information
- Denomination: Lutheran Church – Missouri Synod
- Established: 1963

Current leadership
- President: Rev. Dr. Lucas Woodford

Website
- www.mnsdistrict.org

The Minnesota South District is one of the 35 districts of the Lutheran Church – Missouri Synod (LCMS), and covers the southern third of the state of Minnesota including the Twin Cities area; it also includes two congregations in Wisconsin. The northern two thirds of Minnesota constitute the Minnesota North District, and the rest of Wisconsin is divided between the North Wisconsin and South Wisconsin districts. In addition, two Minnesota congregations are in the non-geographic English District. The Minnesota South District includes approximately 246 congregations and missions, subdivided into 24 circuits, as well as 49 preschools, 45 elementary schools, and 7 high schools. Baptized membership in district congregations is approximately 127,000.

The Minnesota South District was formed in 1963 when the Minnesota District was divided. District offices are located in Burnsville, Minnesota. Delegates from each congregation meet in convention every three years to elect the district president, vice presidents, circuit counselors, a board of directors, and other officers. The Rev. Dr. Lucas Woodford has been the district president since 2018.

Concordia University, Saint Paul, part of the LCMS Concordia University System, is located within the district.

== Presidents ==
- Rev. Ernest H. Stahlke, 1963–1966
- Rev. Martin W. Lieske, 1966–1978
- Rev. O. H. Cloeter, 1978–1991
- Rev. Lane R. Seitz, 1991–2012
- Rev. Dr. Dean Nadasdy, 2012–2018
- Rev. Dr. Lucas Woodford, 2018–present
