= North Wisconsin District of the Lutheran Church – Missouri Synod =

Subdivision of Christian denomination in the U.S.

North Wisconsin District of the LCMS

Location
- Country: United States
- Territory: Northern two-thirds of Wisconsin
- Headquarters: Wausau, Wisconsin

Statistics
- Congregations: 215
- Schools: 40 preschool; 21 elementary; 3 secondary
- Members: 81,000

Information
- Denomination: Lutheran Church – Missouri Synod
- Established: 1916

Current leadership
- President: Rev. Timothy J. Shoup

Website
- www.nwdlcms.org

The North Wisconsin District is one of the 35 districts of the Lutheran Church – Missouri Synod (LCMS), and covers the northern two-thirds of Wisconsin as well as the western half of Michigan's Upper Peninsula. In addition, one congregation in the district's area is in the non-geographic SELC District. The southern third of Wisconsin makes up the South Wisconsin District, and the remainder of Michigan constitutes the Michigan District; there are also two Wisconsin congregations in the Minnesota North District. The North Wisconsin District includes approximately 215 congregations and missions, subdivided into 19 circuits, as well as 25 preschools, 20 elementary schools, and 3 high schools. Baptized membership in district congregations is approximately 81,000.

The North Wisconsin District was formed in 1916 when the Wisconsin District was divided. District offices are located in Wausau, Wisconsin. Delegates from each congregation meet in convention every three years to elect the district president, vice presidents, circuit counselors, a board of directors, and other officers.

== Presidents ==
- Rev. Johann Gotthilf Schliepsiek, 1916–1918
- Rev. Samuel William Herman Daib, 1918–1936
- Rev. William Louis Kohn, 1936–1954
- Rev. Lloyd H. Goetz, 1954–1974
- Rev. Henry E. Simon, 1974–1985
- Rev. Arleigh L. Lutz, Jr., 1985–2006
- Rev. Joel A. Hoelter, 2006–2011
- Rev. Paul Weber, 2011–2012
- Rev. Dwayne Lueck, 2012–2025
- Rev. Timothy Shoup, 2025–ongoing
