= Nebraska District of the Lutheran Church – Missouri Synod =

Subdivision of Christian denomination in the U.S.

Nebraska District of the LCMS

Location
- Country: United States
- Territory: Nebraska excluding the panhandle
- Headquarters: Seward, Nebraska

Statistics
- Congregations: 249
- Schools: 37 preschool; 39 elementary; 4 secondary
- Members: 108,000

Information
- Denomination: Lutheran Church – Missouri Synod
- Established: 1970

Current leadership
- President: Rev. Richard L. Snow

Map
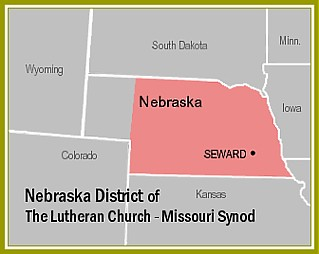

Website
- www.ndlcms.org

The Nebraska District is one of the 35 districts of the Lutheran Church – Missouri Synod (LCMS), and comprises the state of Nebraska with the exception of its Panhandle, which is in the Wyoming District; the district also includes one congregation in Kansas. In addition, one congregation near the state's western border is in the Rocky Mountain District, and another in Lincoln is in the non-geographic English District. The Nebraska District includes approximately 249 congregations and missions, subdivided into 22 circuits, as well as 37 preschools, 39 elementary schools, 4 high schools, and 1 summer camp. Baptized membership in district congregations is approximately 108,000; with the total population of the district's area (Nebraska, excepting its 11 western counties) standing at 1,674,000 as of 2005, the district's membership represents 6.5% of the local population – the highest of any of the LCMS' 33 geographical districts.

The Nebraska District was formed in September 1970 when the Northern Nebraska and Southern Nebraska Districts merged; a portion of the Northern Nebraska District was simultaneously separated to create the Wyoming District. An earlier Nebraska District had existed from 1882 to 1922, before dividing until the 1970 reorganization. District offices are located in Seward, Nebraska.

Delegates from each congregation meet in convention every three years to elect the district president, vice presidents, circuit counselors, a board of directors, and other officers. The Rev. Richard L. Snow has been the district president since 2015.

Concordia University Nebraska, part of the LCMS Concordia University System, is located within the district.

== Presidents ==
- Rev. Frederick A. Niedner, 1970–1978
- Rev. Eldor W. Meyer, 1978–1991
- Rev. Eugene V. Gierke, 1991–2003
- Rev. Russell L. Sommerfeld, 2003–2015
- Rev. Richard L. Snow, 2015–present
