= Pacific Southwest District of the Lutheran Church – Missouri Synod =

Subdivision of Christian denomination in the U.S.

Pacific Southwest District of the LCMS

Location
- Country: United States
- Territory: Southern California, Arizona, and the southern tip of Nevada
- Headquarters: Irvine, California

Statistics
- Congregations: 291
- Schools: 72 preschool; 62 elementary; 9 secondary
- Members: 91,682

Information
- Denomination: Lutheran Church – Missouri Synod
- Established: 1930 (as the Southern California District)

Current leadership
- President: Rev. Dr. Michael E. Gibson

Website
- www.psd-lcms.org

The Pacific Southwest District is one of the 35 districts of the Lutheran Church – Missouri Synod (LCMS). It covers Southern California (the eight southernmost counties in California, including the Los Angeles metropolitan area), Arizona and the southern tip of Nevada, and includes approximately 291 congregations subdivided into 32 circuits, as well as 72 preschools, 65 elementary schools, and nine high schools. Baptized membership of Pacific Southwest congregations is approximately 91,682.

The remainder of California and Nevada is included in the California–Nevada–Hawaii District; one Arizona congregation is in the Rocky Mountain District. In addition, 28 congregations in the Pacific Southwest District's area are in the non-geographic English District – 16 in Arizona, six in the San Diego area and five in the Los Angeles area.

The Pacific Southwest District was formed on July 2, 1930, as the Southern California District, separating it from the California and Nevada District. District offices are located in Irvine, California. Delegates from each congregation meet in convention every three years to elect the district president, vice presidents, circuit counselors, a board of directors, and other officers. The Rev. Dr. Michael E. Gibson has been the district president since September 2018.

Concordia University, Irvine, part of the LCMS' Concordia University System, is located within the district.

== Presidents ==
- Rev. Gotthold H. F. Smukal, 1930–1942
- Rev. Walter F. Troeger, 1942–1948
- Rev. Armand E. T. Mueller, 1948–1955
- Rev. Victor L. Behnken, 1955–1969
- Rev. Arnold G. Kuntz, 1969–1985
- Rev. Loren T. Kramer, 1985–2000
- Rev. Larry A. Stoterau, 2000–2018
- Rev. Michael E. Gibson, 2018–Present
