= New Jersey District of the Lutheran Church – Missouri Synod =

Subdivision of Christian denomination in the U.S.

New Jersey District of the LCMS

Location
- Country: United States
- Territory: New Jersey
- Headquarters: Mountainside, New Jersey

Statistics
- Congregations: 54
- Schools: 24 preschool; 5 elementary
- Members: 14,000

Information
- Denomination: Lutheran Church – Missouri Synod
- Established: 1972

Current leadership
- President: Rev. Stephen Gewecke

Map
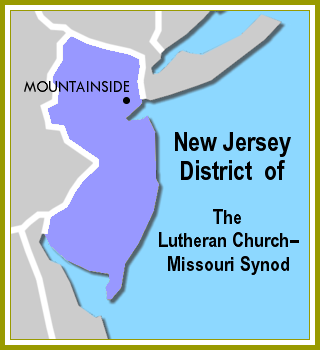

Website
- www.njdistrict.org

The New Jersey District is one of the 35 districts of the Lutheran Church – Missouri Synod (LCMS) and comprises the state of New Jersey and one congregation just across the state line in Milford, Pennsylvania; five of the state's congregations are in the non-geographic English District, and five more are in the SELC District. The New Jersey District includes approximately 54 congregations and missions (the fewest of any geographic district), subdivided into 6 circuits, as well as 24 preschools and 5 elementary schools. Baptized membership in district congregations is approximately 14,000.

The New Jersey District was formed in 1972 out of part of the Atlantic District. District offices are located in Mountainside, New Jersey. The Rev. Stephen Gewecke was elected District President in 2021. Delegates from each congregation meet in convention every three years to elect the district president, three vice presidents, circuit counselors, a board of directors, and other officers.

== Presidents ==
- Rev. Walter L. Zeile, 1972–1985
- Rev. Donald W. Sandmann, 1985–2000
- Rev. William R. Klettke, 2000–2012
- Rev. Anthony J. Steinbronn, 2012–2021
- Rev. Stephen Gewecke, 2021–present
