= Northwest District of the Lutheran Church – Missouri Synod =

Subdivision of Christian denomination in the U.S.

Northwest District of the LCMS

Location
- Country: United States
- Territory: Alaska, Idaho, Oregon, and Washington
- Headquarters: Portland, Oregon

Statistics
- Congregations: 267
- Schools: 93 preschool; 31 elementary; 4 secondary
- Members: 65,461

Information
- Denomination: Lutheran Church – Missouri Synod
- Established: 1899

Current leadership
- President: Rev. Micahel von Behren

Map
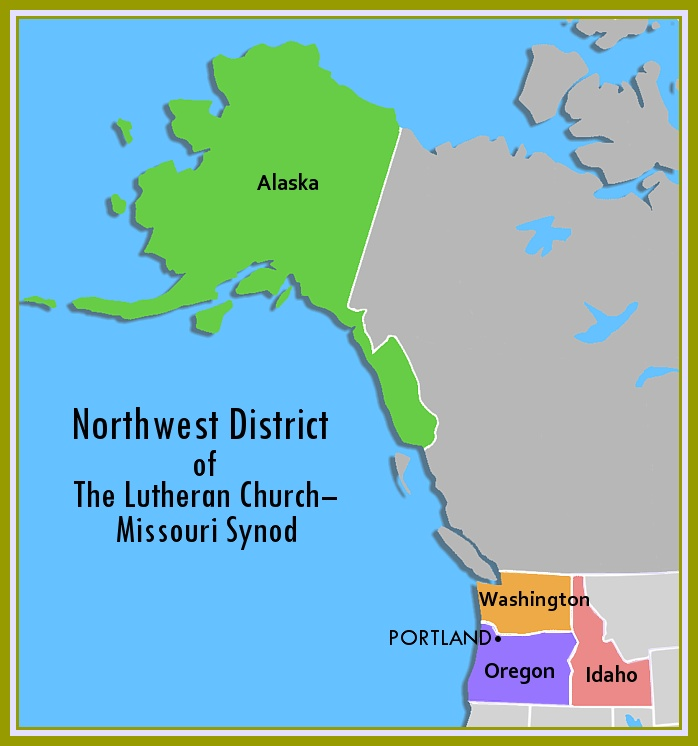

Website
- www.nowlcms.org

The Northwest District is one of the 35 districts of the Lutheran Church – Missouri Synod (LCMS), and encompasses the states of Alaska, Idaho, Oregon, and Washington; one Idaho congregation is in the Montana District. The Northwest District includes approximately 267 congregations and missions, subdivided into 25 circuits, as well as 93 preschools, 31 elementary schools and 4 high schools . Baptized membership in district congregations is approximately 65,461.

The Northwest District was formed as the Oregon and Washington District in 1899 when the California and Oregon District was divided, also creating the California and Nevada District; the name was changed to the Northwest District in 1948. District offices are located in Portland, Oregon. The Rev. Paul Linnemann became the district president in 2009.

Concordia University in Portland, part of the LCMS' Concordia University System, was located within the district. It closed in Spring of 2020.

== Presidents ==
- Rev. Henry August Carl Paul, 1899–1903
- Rev. W. Lüssenhop, 1903–1906
- Rev. W. H. Behrens, 1906–1909
- Rev. Ludwig Frederick Emil Stuebe, 1909–1918
- Rev. Johann Adam Rimbach, 1918–1921
- Rev. Weert J. Janssen, 1921–1936
- Rev. Frederick Max Leopold Nitz, 1936–1948
- Rev. Carl H. Bensene, 1948–1970
- Rev. Emil G. Jaech, 1970–1982
- Rev. Erhart L. Bauer, 1982–1994
- Rev. Dr. Warren W. Schumacher, 1994–2009
- Rev. Paul Linnemann, 2009–2024
- Rev. Michael Von Behren, 2024-Present
