= Michigan District =

Michigan District is the name of:

- Michigan District (Church of the Brethren)
- Michigan District (Lutheran Church–Missouri Synod)
- another name for Amtrak's Michigan Line
