= Kansas District of the Lutheran Church – Missouri Synod =

Subdivision of Christian denomination in the U.S.

Kansas District of the LCMS

Location
- Country: United States
- Territory: Kansas
- Headquarters: Topeka, Kansas

Statistics
- Congregations: 160
- Schools: 44 preschool; 14 elementary
- Members: 55,800

Information
- Denomination: Lutheran Church – Missouri Synod
- Established: 1888

Current leadership
- President: Rev. Justin A. Panzer

Map
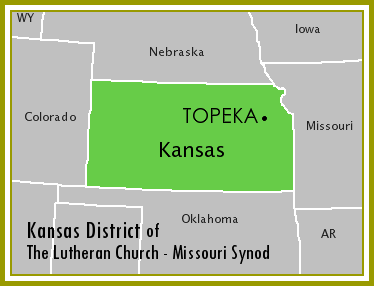

Website
- www.kslcms.org

The Kansas District is one of the 35 districts of the Lutheran Church – Missouri Synod (LCMS). The district includes approximately 160 Kansas congregations and missions, subdivided into 16 circuits, as well as 44 preschools and 14 elementary schools. Baptized membership in district congregations is approximately 55,800.

The Kansas District was formed in 1888 out of the Western District and at various times included territory in Colorado, Oklahoma, and New Mexico; portions of the district were separated into the Colorado District (later renamed the Rocky Mountain District) and the Oklahoma District in 1921 and 1924 respectively, and the New Mexico areas were later transferred to the Colorado District in 1941-1942.

The Kansas District office is located in Topeka, Kansas. Delegates from each congregation meet in convention every three years to elect the district president, four vice presidents, circuit visitors, a board of directors, and other officers. In August 2019, the Rev. Justin A. Panzer became district president, succeeding the Rev. Peter K. Lange, who was elected first vice-president of the Lutheran Church – Missouri Synod at the 2019 LCMS national convention.

== Presidents ==
- Rev. Friedrich Pennekamp, 1888–1894
- Rev. Carl (Karl/Charles) Hafner, 1894–1906
- Rev. Friedrich Christoph Droegemueller, 1906–1912
- Rev. Theodore H. Juengel, 1912–1919
- Rev. Carl Frederick Lehenbauer, 1919–1932 (died in office)
- Rev. William Mahler, 1932–1939
- Rev. Walter H. Meyer, 1939–1960
- Rev. Arlen J. Bruns, 1960–1978
- Rev. George J. Bruening, 1978–1985
- Rev. Eugene E. Schmidt, 1985–1994
- Rev. Howard J. Patten, 1994–2003
- Rev. Keith E. Kohlmeier, 2003–2015
- Rev. Peter K. Lange, 2015–2019
- Rev. Justin A. Panzer, 2019–present
