= Wyoming District of the Lutheran Church – Missouri Synod =

Subdivision of Christian denomination in the U.S.

Wyoming District of the LCMS

Location
- Country: United States
- Territory: Wyoming and Nebraska Panhandle
- Headquarters: Casper, Wyoming

Statistics
- Congregations: 61
- Schools: 10 preschool; 4 elementary
- Members: 13,700

Information
- Denomination: Lutheran Church – Missouri Synod
- Established: 1970

Current leadership
- President: Rev. John E. Hill

Website
- www.wylcms.org

The Wyoming District is one of the 35 districts of the Lutheran Church – Missouri Synod (LCMS), and encompasses the state of Wyoming as well as the Nebraska Panhandle and one congregation in Colorado; the rest of Nebraska constitutes the Nebraska District except for one congregation in the Rocky Mountain District, which also includes the rest of Colorado. The Wyoming District includes approximately 61 congregations and missions, subdivided into 6 circuits, as well as 10 preschools and 4 elementary schools. Baptized membership in district congregations is approximately 13,700, making it one of the two smallest districts along with the Montana District, which is roughly equal in size; a merger of the two districts has been proposed.

The Wyoming District was formed on September 30, 1970, separating from the Northern Nebraska District – which then merged with the Southern Nebraska District to form the current Nebraska District. Wyoming District offices are located in Casper, Wyoming. Delegates from each congregation meet in convention every three years to elect the district president, vice presidents, circuit counselors, a board of directors, and other officers. The Rev. John E. Hill became district president in 2015.

== Presidents ==
- Rev. Henry W. Niermann, 1970–1982
- Rev. Wilbert J. Sohns, 1982–1991
- Rev. Robert C. Oberheu, 1991–1994
- Rev. Ronald M. Garwood, 1994–2006
- Rev. Richard O. Boche, 2006–2015
- Rev. John E. Hill, 2015–present
