= Iowa District East of the Lutheran Church – Missouri Synod =

Subdivision of Lutheran denomination in the U.S.

Iowa District East of the LCMS
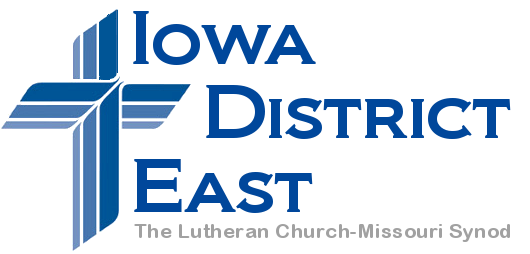

Location
- Country: United States
- Territory: Eastern Iowa
- Headquarters: Marion, Iowa

Statistics
- Congregations: 119
- Schools: 32 preschool; 9 elementary; 1 secondary
- Members: 40,000

Information
- Denomination: Lutheran Church – Missouri Synod
- Established: 1936

Current leadership
- President: Rev. Brian S. Saunders

Website
- www.lcmside.org

The Iowa District East is one of the 35 districts of the Lutheran Church – Missouri Synod (LCMS), and covers the eastern half of the state of Iowa; the rest of the state forms the Iowa District West. The Iowa District East includes approximately 119 congregations and missions, subdivided into 12 circuits, as well as 32 preschools, 9 elementary schools, and 1 high school. Baptized membership in district congregations is over 40,000.

The Iowa District East was formed in 1936 when the Iowa District (created in 1879) was divided in half. District offices are located in Marion, Iowa. Delegates from each congregation meet in convention every three years to elect the district president, vice presidents, circuit counselors, a board of directors, and other officers. The Rev. Brian S. Saunders was elected district president in June 2009.

== Presidents ==
- Rev. Herman A. Harms, 1936–1938
- Rev. Carl J. H. Heffe, 1938–1949
- Rev. Walter D. Oetting, 1949–1963
- Rev. Fred H. Ilten, 1963–1970
- Rev. John C. Zimmermann, 1970–1982
- Rev. Alvin L. Barry, 1982–1992
- Rev. Curtis R. Moermond, 1992–2000
- Rev. Gary M. Arp, 2000–2009
- Rev. Brian S. Saunders, 2009–Present
