= New England District of the Lutheran Church – Missouri Synod =

Subdivision of Christian denomination in the U.S.

New England District of the LCMS

Location
- Country: United States
- Territory: Connecticut, Maine, Massachusetts, New Hampshire, Rhode Island, and Vermont
- Headquarters: Springfield, Massachusetts

Statistics
- Congregations: 70
- Schools: 53 preschool; 49 elementary; 3 secondary
- Members: 21,391 Baptized; 19,030 Confirmed

Information
- Denomination: Lutheran Church – Missouri Synod
- Established: 1972

Current leadership
- President: Rev. Robert Beinke

Map
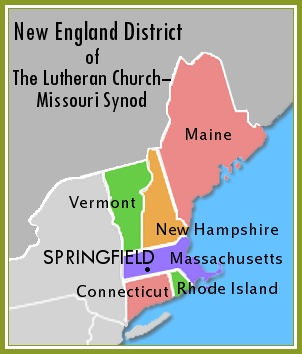

Website
- www.ned-lcms.org

The New England District is one of the 35 districts of the Lutheran Church – Missouri Synod (LCMS), and encompasses all six New England states: Maine, New Hampshire, Vermont, Massachusetts, Rhode Island and Connecticut. In addition, three congregations in southwest Connecticut are in the non-geographic SELC District. The New England District includes approximately 70 congregations and missions, subdivided into 9 circuits, as well as 24 preschools and 5 elementary schools. Baptized membership is over 22,000; with New England's total population standing at 14,240,000 as of 2005, the District's membership represents only 0.16% of the local population – the lowest of any of the LCMS' 33 geographical districts.

The New England District was formed in 1972 out of the Atlantic District. District offices are located in Springfield, Massachusetts. Delegates from each congregation meet in convention every three years in Springfield to elect the district president, vice presidents, circuit counselors, a board of directors, and other officers. The Rev. Timothy Yeadon was elected to his first term as District President at the 16th Regular Convention, June 14–16, 2012, succeeding the Rev. James Keurulainen, who served from 1997 to 2012. Yeadon was re-elected at subsequent district conventions, but died in office on January 16, 2022. He was succeeded as District President by the First Vice President, the Rev. Robert Beinke. Beinke was then elected to a full term as District President during the New England District Convention of June 2022.

== Presidents ==
- Rev. Robert J. Riedel, 1972–1976
- Rev. Martin Dienst, 1976–1985
- Rev. David Mulder, 1985–1991
- Rev. Osmar Lehenbauer, 1991–1997
- Rev. James E. Keurulainen, 1997–2012
- Rev. Dr. Timothy Yeadon, 2012–2022
- Rev. Robert Beinke, 2022–Present

Riedel was among four district presidents who were removed from office by Synod President J. A. O. Preus on April 2, 1976, for non-compliance with synodical directives on the ordination and placement of improperly endorsed ministerial candidates from Seminex.

Riedel (1961–1972), Mulder (1981–1985), and Lehenbauer (1986–1991) had all previously served as pastor at Immanuel Lutheran Church in Bristol, Connecticut.
