= Southern District of the Lutheran Church – Missouri Synod =

Subdivision of Christian denomination in the U.S.

Southern District of the LCMS

Location
- Country: United States
- Territory: Louisiana, Mississippi, Alabama, and the western portion of the Florida Panhandle
- Headquarters: Slidell, Louisiana

Statistics
- Congregations: 170
- Schools: 14 preschool; 17 elementary; 1 secondary
- Members: 29,391

Information
- Denomination: Lutheran Church – Missouri Synod
- Established: 1882

Current leadership
- President: Rev. Eric C. Johnson

Map
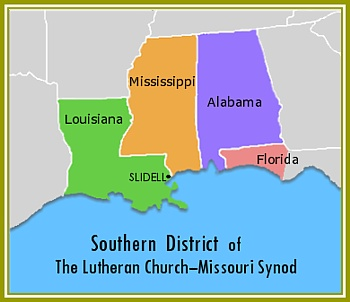

Website
- www.southernlcms.org

The Southern District is one of the 35 districts of the Lutheran Church – Missouri Synod (LCMS), and encompasses the states of Louisiana, Mississippi and Alabama, as well as the western portion of the Florida Panhandle; the rest of Florida is part of the Florida–Georgia District. The Southern District includes approximately 170 congregations and missions, subdivided into 15 circuits, as well as 14 preschools, 17 elementary schools, and 1 high school. Baptized membership in Southern District congregations is approximately 29,391.

The Southern District was formed on February 8, 1882, out of the Western District; portions of the district were separated into the Texas District and the Florida–Georgia District in 1906 and 1948 respectively. In 1963, 54 black congregations that were part of the Synodical Conference's Mission Program were merged into the Southern District; 33 such congregations in central Alabama were consolidated into 10 congregations shortly thereafter. About 40 existing congregations are historically black congregations, and most of the black pastors and teachers in the LCMS originated in this area.

District offices are located in Slidell, Louisiana. Delegates from each congregation meet in convention every three years to elect the district president, vice Presidents and other officers. In 2018, Rev. Eric Johnson was elected as district president.

Concordia College Alabama in Selma, founded in 1922 as part of the mission program of the Synodical Conference, was a member of the LCMS Concordia University System and was located within the district until its closure in 2018.

== Presidents ==
- Rev. Timotheus Stiemke, 1882–1888
- Rev. Gotthilf Heinrich Wilhelm Birkmann, 1888–1891
- Rev. Gottfried Johann Wegener, 1891–1927
- Rev. Martin W. H. Holls, 1927–1954
- Rev. Paul W. Streufert, 1954–1957
- Rev. Edgar W. Homrighausen, 1957–1969
- Rev. Lothar Kleinhans, 1969–1970
- Rev. John E. Ellermann, 1970–1978
- Rev. Richard H. Meyer, 1978–1988
- Rev. Orval D. Mueller, 1988–2003
- Rev. Kurtis D. Schultz, 2003–2018
- Rev. Eric C. Johnson, 2018–present
