= New England District =

New England District may refer to:

- New England District of the Lutheran Church–Missouri Synod, U.S.
- Electoral district of New England, New South Wales, Australia

== See also ==
- New England (disambiguation)
