= Spenser Somers Foundation =

American nonprofit foundation

- Abbreviation: SSF
- Formation: November 9, 2000
- Type: Charitable foundation
- Headquarters: Edina, Minnesota, United States
- Key people: Dan Arom; Marty Collins; Chris Davis; Nick Kennedy
- Revenue: $66,243 (2016)
- Expenses: $22,833 (2016)
- Website: www.spensersomers.org

The Spenser Somers Foundation (SSF) is a Minnesota-based charitable foundation that raises money for children with cancer and other needy causes. The foundation was established in the memory of Spenser J. Somers.

== Spenser Somers' life ==
Spenser J. Somers was born in Kansas City, Missouri, on February 21, 1972. In 1984 his family moved to Edina, Minnesota. Spenser, known to his friends as Spense, was active in sports and popular at school. In June 1985 a lump was found in his stomach, which was diagnosed as Primitive Neuroectodermal Tumor (PNET), a rare form of cancer. That July, Spenser's spleen and part of his stomach were removed in the first of many operations. Even after his diagnosis, Somers continued to be active. Despite a deteriorating body and balding hair, he played basketball and baseball in grades 9 and 10 and was vice president of his junior class. He was on the staff and was published in Edina High School's literary magazine, Images on the Wind. He was selected to read his work at the Loft bookstore in Minneapolis. In 1989 Somers was crowned homecoming king at Edina High School. He received a standing ovation from more than 1,000 fellow students at the school's homecoming rally and two more when he gave one of the commencement speeches at his graduation ceremony in June. He was selected "most respected person" by his class. Despite a deteriorating body and balding hair, Somers walked down the halls of his high school with a cheerful face and air of confidence.

Somers was Christian and very spiritual. He was vice president of the Cross View Lutheran Church Youth Group for two terms and a member of the Oasis Senior Youth Group. He did volunteer work with Sister Jean's Mercy Missions Cookie Cart, a bakery in north Minneapolis, and went to Kentucky to help poor families rebuild their homes. His courage was inspiring to the Edina community and his battle gained regional attention. In a 1989 interview in the Star Tribune, Somers said about his personal struggle:

I think the cancer has strengthened my character and it might have shaped my life. It's given me a focus on what I am and who I am. I don't think about death. The word doesn't bother me, but it gets in the way of the present. It gets in the way of having a good time with my friends and family.

Somers attended St. John's University in Collegeville for only a week his freshman year of college before his illness forced him to return home. Spenser Somers died November 9, 1990, at the age of 18. His death received wide attention in the Twin Cities area, and his funeral was attended by many in the community.

In 1997, Spenser's mother Karen, and his favorite writing teacher, Carolyn Rebholz, posthumously published his journal entries and poetry in a tribute to his life in Eating LIFE cereal with a bigger spoon than most.

== Spenser Somers Foundation ==
On 2000-11-09, exactly ten years after Somers' death, the Spenser Somers Foundation (SSF) was established to support the activities of under-privileged youth and people living with cancer. The chairman of the foundation's board of directors is Chris Davis, who was Somers' next-door-neighbor and best friend.

In order to further its goal, SSF began the Spenser Somers Fund to support expenses not covered by insurance and extracurricular activities for children with cancer and their families.

One of the organization's first projects was to raise funds for Total Victory Christian Center, an outreach church in Minneapolis that provides support for a local church and troubled inner-city youth.

The Spenser Somers Foundation served as umbrella organization for the Phuket Project, which sent volunteers and aid to rebuild areas in southern Thailand devastated by the December 2004 tsunami. More than 700,000 baht and hundreds of thousands of volunteer hours were spent helping to rebuild homes, schools, businesses, temples and community centers in Phang Nga Province, Khao Lak and Phuket.

To raise funds for these activities, SSF holds an annual Real McCoy Golf Challenge.
