= Iowa District West of the Lutheran Church – Missouri Synod =

Subdivision of Christian denomination in the U.S.

Iowa District West of the LCMS

Location
- Country: United States
- Territory: Western Iowa
- Headquarters: Fort Dodge, Iowa

Statistics
- Congregations: 175
- Schools: 45 preschool; 8 elementary
- Members: 59,000

Information
- Denomination: Lutheran Church – Missouri Synod
- Established: 1936

Current leadership
- President: Rev. Dr. Steven Turner

Website
- www.idwlcms.org

The Iowa District West is one of the 35 districts of the Lutheran Church – Missouri Synod (LCMS), and covers the western half of the state of Iowa including the state capital, Des Moines; the rest of the state forms the Iowa District East. The Iowa District West includes approximately 175 congregations and missions, subdivided into 19 circuits, as well as 45 preschools and 8 elementary schools. Baptized membership in district congregations is approximately 59,000.

The Iowa District West was formed in 1936 when the Iowa District (created in 1879) was divided in half. District offices are located in Fort Dodge, Iowa. Delegates from each congregation meet in convention every three years to elect the district president, vice presidents, circuit counselors, a board of directors, and other officers.

== Presidents ==
- Rev. Adolph Schwidder, 1936–1945
- Rev. Herbert W. Berner, 1945–1946
- Rev. John Theodore Martin Hoemann, 1946–1948
- Rev. Gustav W. Lobeck, 1948–1966
- Rev. A. Ellis Nieting, 1966–1985
- Rev. Richard G. Kapfer, 1985–2000
- Rev. Paul G. Sieveking, 2000–2015
- Rev. Dr. Steven Turner, 2015–2025
- Rev. Paul Egger, 2025–present
