= Montana District =

Montana District may refer to:

- Montana District (LCMS), one of the 35 districts of the Lutheran Church - Missouri Synod
- Montana Province (Bulgarian: Област Монтана, transliterated: Oblast Montana), also referred to as Montana District or Montana Region
