= Oklahoma District of the Lutheran Church – Missouri Synod =

Subdivision of Christian denomination in the U.S.

Oklahoma District of the LCMS

Location
- Country: United States
- Territory: Oklahoma
- Headquarters: Moore, Oklahoma

Statistics
- Congregations: 78
- Schools: 17 preschool; 8 elementary; 1 high school
- Members: 14,136

Information
- Denomination: Lutheran Church – Missouri Synod
- Established: 1924

Current leadership
- President: Rev. David Nehrenz

Website
- www.oklahomalutherans.org

The Oklahoma District is one of the 35 districts of the Lutheran Church – Missouri Synod (LCMS), and comprises the state of Oklahoma. It includes approximately 78 congregations, subdivided into 9 circuits, as well as 17 preschools, 8 elementary schools and one high school. Baptized membership in district congregations is approximately 14,136.

The Oklahoma District was formed in 1924 out of the Kansas District. District offices are located in Moore, Oklahoma. Delegates from each congregation meet in convention every three years to elect the district president, vice presidents, circuit counselors, a board of directors, and other officers. Rev. David Nehrenz was elected in 2022 and again in 2025.

== Presidents ==
- Rev. Henry Mueller, 1924–1939
- Rev. Carl R. Matthies, 1939–1940
- Rev. Edward C. Hauer, 1940–1942
- Rev. Paul J. Hartenberger, 1942–1943
- Rev. Otto Henry Hoyer, 1943–1954
- Rev. Alfred E. Behrend, 1954–1970
- Rev. Harold E. Brockhoff, 1970–1978
- Rev. Gerhard F. Bode, 1978–1988
- Rev. Robert L. Jackson, 1988–1991
- Rev. William R. Diekelman, 1991–2004
- Rev. Paul A. Hartman, 2004–2009
- Rev. Barrie E. Henke, 2009–2022
- Rev. David Nehrenz, 2022–present
