= South Dakota District of the Lutheran Church – Missouri Synod =

Subdivision of Christian denomination in the U.S.

South Dakota District of the LCMS

Location
- Country: United States
- Territory: South Dakota
- Headquarters: Sioux Falls, South Dakota

Statistics
- Congregations: 108
- Schools: 16 preschool; 4 elementary; 1 secondary
- Members: 23,000

Information
- Denomination: Lutheran Church – Missouri Synod
- Established: 1906

Current leadership
- President: Rev. Randy Sturzenbecher

Map
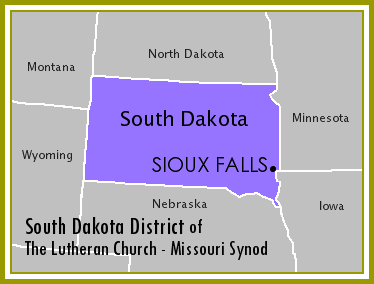

Website
- www.sddlcms.org

The South Dakota District is one of the 35 districts of the Lutheran Church – Missouri Synod (LCMS), and comprises the state of South Dakota; one congregation in the state is in the North Dakota District. The South Dakota District includes approximately 108 congregations and missions, subdivided into 8 circuits, as well as 16 preschools, 4 elementary schools and 1 high school. Baptized membership in district congregations is over 23,000.

The South Dakota District was formed in 1906 out of the Minnesota and Dakota District, with the rest of the district continuing to use that name until 1910. District offices are located in Sioux Falls, South Dakota. Delegates from each congregation meet in convention every three years to elect the district president, vice presidents, circuit visitors, a board of directors, and other officers.

== Presidents ==
- Rev. August Frederick Breihan, 1906–1912
- Rev. Johann Dietrich Ehlen, 1912–1918
- Rev. Ernst Gottlieb Jehn, 1918–1921
- Rev. Friedrich W. Leyhe, 1921–1936
- Rev. Walter Nitschke, 1936–1951
- Rev. Philip H. Mueller, 1951–1960
- Rev. Elmer O. Luessenhop, 1960–1968
- Rev. Leonard Eberhard, 1968–1970
- Rev. Arthur J. Crosmer, 1970–1978
- Rev. Paul G. Wendling, 1978–1988
- Rev. Raymond L. Hartwig, 1988–1998
- Rev. Vernon L. Schindler, 1998–2006
- Rev. Dale L. Sattgast, 2006–2015
- Rev. Scott Sailer, 2015–2025
- Rev. Randy Sturzenbecher, 2025–present
