= Promise Keepers =

Evangelical Christian organization for men

- Founded: December 3, 1990
- Founder: Bill McCartney
- Founded at: Boulder, Colorado
- Type: Nonprofit
- Headquarters: Colorado Springs, Colorado, United States
- Region served: International
- Key people: Shane Winnings, Chairman
- Budget: $2 million (2020)
- Employees: 28 (2020)
- Website: promisekeepers.org

Promise Keepers is an Evangelical Christian parachurch organization for men. It opposes same-sex marriage, and champions chastity and marital fidelity and the man as being head of the household.

Promise Keepers originated in the United States, but independent branches have also been established in Canada and New Zealand. It is a non-profit organization, not affiliated with any Christian church or denomination. Its most widely publicized events tend to be mass rallies held at football stadiums and similar venues.

== History ==
Promise Keepers was founded in 1990 by Bill McCartney, then the head football coach at the University of Colorado Boulder. The organization was incorporated as a nonprofit in the state of Colorado on December 3, 1990.

What Makes a Man?, Promise Keepers' first hardbound book written for the organization, was published by The Navigators' Navpress publishing arm in 1992 for its first Folsom Field gathering in June of that year. James Dobson had McCartney on his Focus on the Family nationwide radio program that same month. McCartney resigned his coaching position in 1994 in order to focus his attention on the organization.

Promise Keepers' most notable event was its Stand in the Gap: A Sacred Assembly of Men open-air gathering at the National Mall in Washington, D.C., on October 4, 1997. C-SPAN carried the event live in its entirety. Attendance figures vary but have been estimated to be between 600,000 and 800,000. This was probably its peak, with the organization halving its office staff four months later due to financial problems and the admission fee of $60 for regional rallies dropped in a number of regions. Rally attendance and finances continued to suffer and a planned millennial march to take part at the capital of every state was cancelled.

Promise Keepers has at the same time extended its organization outside the United States, setting up Promise Keepers International which holds "Summit Meetings" in at least seven languages and has set up chapters in other countries.

McCartney resigned as president on October 1, 2003, after a personal leave of absence to take care of his ailing wife, who had a severe respiratory illness.

In April 2018, Promise Keepers announced that the appointment of a new chairman of the board, Ken Harrison. Harrison is also CEO of WaterStone Foundation, a Christian donor-advised fund. He is a former police officer with the Los Angeles Police Department.

=== Promise Keepers relaunch ===
Under Harrison's leadership, Promise Keepers then began a "relaunch" campaign with a new approach focused on having one stadium event per year and following up with Bible studies and other resources.

In May 2020, Promise Keepers announced that its relaunch event at AT&T Stadium would become an online virtual event in light of the COVID-19 pandemic.

Since moving their relaunch event at the AT&T Stadium in Arlington, Texas to a virtual platform, Promise Keepers has hosted a variety of live-streamed events and had a live, in-person AT&T Stadium event scheduled for July 16–17, 2021.

In early 2024, the organization appointed a new Chairman and CEO, Shane Winnings, who is a military veteran and former law enforcement officer. The organization then announced its first large event since 2021. The event was held at Oral Roberts University in Tulsa in August 2024.

In 2024, Promise Keepers worked to downplay the organization's previous emphasis on combating racism and building interracial relationships. Instead, it took on a more political outlook, favoring the American Republican party.

== Reception ==
=== Doctrines ===
Promise Keepers has been lauded for its Christian focus. However, the group has also been criticized for doctrinal compromises and inconsistent doctrines.

Raymond Hartwig, a former president of the South Dakota District of the Lutheran Church-Missouri Synod, commented: "They use the Bible in a very simplistic form, as a springboard to jump into the law."

=== Same-sex relationships ===
Promise Keepers champion the exclusive legitimacy of heterosexuality and denigrate homosexuality as sinful. Promise Keeper founder, the late University of Colorado football coach Bill McCartney, called homosexuals "a group of people who don't reproduce, yet want to be compared with people who do reproduce," and maintained that he believed, "Homosexuality is an abomination of Almighty God."

Critics call the Promise Keepers approach to homosexuality "simplistic, sexist, homophobic and patriarchal," and "based on exclusion," and that within the views of the organization, "there's no place for gays and lesbians. There is no place for women except as subservient to men."

Belmont University, a private Christian school in Tennessee, cancelled a Promise Keepers event in 2023 after the organization published a Pride month blog post that the university said was "harmful to members of our community."

=== Role of Women ===
The National Organization for Women (NOW), an American feminist organization, has expressed the view that the Promise Keepers pose a threat to women's rights. NOW contends that the group encourages inequality within marriages and teaches a doctrine of male superiority.

In August, 2020, Promise Keepers chairman Ken Harrison spoke on the topic of Promise Keepers and how it relates to women. "We're really calling men to be humble, proactive leaders in their homes. I don't feel like it's my role to tell women how they should be. That is for their pastor and other people."

According to Amy Schindler, "the discourse of masculinity found within conservative religious movements, such as the Promise Keepers and the Victorian era movement 'muscular Christianity,' is inherently political. Any masculinity project aimed at restoring or reclaiming a 'traditional' male role for privileged white, heterosexual males has a political impact within the tapestry of class, race, and gender power" (1998). Academic Browyn Kara Conrad argued in a 2006 article that the organization reproduces problematic sexual scripts such as the Madonna/whore view of female sexuality and a view of the male sex drive as uncontrollable. A 2002 article from the Nordic Journal of Feminist and Gender Research argued that, despite their initial appearance to be pro-feminist, the Promise Keepers build upon patriarchal assumptions, including having the man as the actor in the family, church, and world, and that they expect women to be passively dependent.

=== Manhood ===
The organization places particular emphasis on godly manhood, with an emphasis on fatherhood. John Bartkowski saw Promise Keepers' leadership in 2000 as evoking two types of manhood: first, is an essentialist appeal to gender difference advocated by Edwin Louis Cole that emphasizes aggression, strength, and rationality; second, is Gary Oliver's "expressive manhood", which says that all of the traits now traditionally attributed to women were practiced by Jesus, and that men should re-connect with their sensitive side. According to a 1999 Yeshiva University study, when it comes to fatherhood, the organization tends to be more conservative, supporting heterosexist, male predominance in the family.

=== Race ===
Following the murder of George Floyd, Promise Keepers launched Promise 6 Sunday, an event aimed toward "building unity" among churches. The event included resources from various evangelical leaders and American public figures including Samuel Rodriguez, Tony Dungy, Alveda King, Donald Burgs Jr., Chad Hennings, and Ken Harrison.

Patrick Glynn argues that the Promise Keepers succeed in racial reconciliation where politics has seemed to fail. Scholar Siphiwe Dube notes that the organization has open discussions of race that promote racial reconciliation. L. Dean Allen finds that while the organizations' leaders primarily claim that Satan is responsible for fostering racism in individuals and that the best way to counter racism is for people to personally repent and go to confession, PK participants see racism as a more multifaceted issue, citing historical animosity, economic differences, and racial fear. Further, while both leaders and participants see forming relationships with members of other races as important to battling racism, participants do not see PK events as valuable in developing these relationships. Andrea Smith also notes that race relations between Promise Keepers and Native communities is more open.

== See also ==
- List of Christian movements
- Brotherly love (philosophy)
- Chuck Swindoll
