= Texas District of the Lutheran Church – Missouri Synod =

Subdivision of Christian denomination in the U.S.

Texas District of the LCMS

Location
- Country: United States
- Territory: Texas, excluding El Paso County
- Headquarters: Round Rock, Texas

Statistics
- Congregations: 360
- Schools: 73 preschool; 41 elementary; 10 secondary
- Members: 133,000

Information
- Denomination: Lutheran Church – Missouri Synod
- Established: 1906

Current leadership
- President: Rev. Jon Braunersreuther

Map
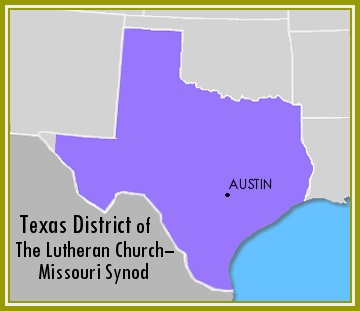

Website
- www.txdistlcms.org

The Texas District is one of the 35 districts of the Lutheran Church – Missouri Synod (LCMS), and comprises the state of Texas with the exception of El Paso County, which is in the Rocky Mountain District. The Texas District includes approximately 360 congregations and missions (second to only the Michigan District), subdivided into 39 circuits, as well as 73 preschools, 41 elementary schools, and 10 high schools. Baptized membership in district congregations is approximately 133,000.

The Texas District was formed in 1906 out of the Southern District, and at one time included congregations in southern New Mexico, but these were transferred to the Colorado District (since renamed the Rocky Mountain District) in 1941-1942. District offices are located in Round Rock, Texas. Delegates from each congregation meet in convention every three years to elect the district president, vice presidents, circuit counselors, a board of directors, and other officers. The Rev. Jon Braunersreuther has been the district president since June 2025.

== Presidents ==
- Rev. Adolf W. Kramer, 1906–1909
- Rev. Charles A. Waech, 1909–1912
- Rev. Gotthilf Heinrich Wilhelm Birkmann, 1912–1920
- Rev. Henry Peter Studtmann, 1920–1926
- Rev. John W. Behnken, 1926–1929
- Rev. Constantin Martin Beyer, 1929–1942
- Rev. Edwin A. Heckmann, 1942–1948
- Rev. Oliver R. Harms, 1948–1950
- Rev. Roland P. Wiederaenders, 1950–1959
- Rev. Albert F. Jesse, 1959–1963
- Rev. Carl A. Heckmann, 1963–1978
- Rev. Glenn R. O'Shoney, 1978–1989
- Rev. Louis L. Pabor, 1989–1991
- Rev. Gerald B. Kieschnick, 1991–2001
- Rev. James R. Linderman, 2001–2006
- Rev. Kenneth M. Hennings, 2006–2018
- Rev. Michael W. Newman, 2018–2025
- Rev. Jon Braunersreuther, 2025-present
