= Rocky Mountain District of the Lutheran Church – Missouri Synod =

Subdivision of Christian denomination in the U.S.

Rocky Mountain District of the LCMS

Location
- Country: United States
- Territory: Colorado, New Mexico, Utah, and El Paso County, Texas
- Headquarters: Englewood, Colorado

Statistics
- Congregations: 183
- Schools: 35 preschool; 31 elementary; 4 secondary
- Members: 53,311

Information
- Denomination: Lutheran Church – Missouri Synod
- Established: 1921 (as the Colorado District)

Current leadership
- President: Rev. James Maxwell

Map
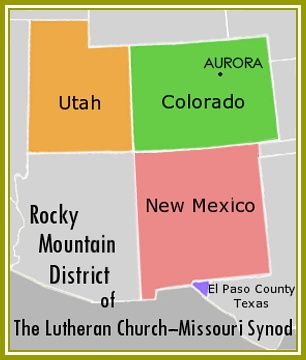

Website
- www.rm.lcms.org

The Rocky Mountain District is one of the 35 districts of the Lutheran Church – Missouri Synod (LCMS). It encompasses the states of Colorado, New Mexico and Utah, as well as El Paso County, Texas; the rest of Texas constitutes the Texas District, and one Colorado congregation is in the Wyoming District. The district also includes one congregation each from the states of Arizona and Nebraska. One Utah congregation is in the non-geographic English District. The Rocky Mountain District includes approximately 183 congregations and missions, subdivided into 17 circuits, as well as 35 preschools, 31 elementary schools, and 4 high schools. Baptized membership in district congregations is approximately 53,311.

The Rocky Mountain District was formed in 1921 as the Colorado District, separating from the Kansas District. It originally consisted of Colorado and Utah, and expanded as congregations were started elsewhere. New Mexico was added to the district from portions of the Kansas and Texas Districts in 1941–1942. District office is located in Englewood, Colorado. Delegates from each congregation meet in convention every three years to elect the district president, vice presidents, circuit counselors, a board of directors, and other officers. The Rev. James Maxwell has been the district president since 2022.

The oldest congregation in the district, Hope Lutheran Church of Westcliffe, Colorado, was founded in 1872. Its present building was built in 1917 and has been listed on the National Register of Historic Places since 1978.

== Presidents ==
- Rev. Otto Luessenhop, 1921–1930
- Rev. Otto K. Hensel, 1930–1934
- Rev. Frederick William Obermeier, 1934–1942
- Rev. E. Julius Friedrich, 1942–1950
- Rev. Henry G. Hartner, 1950–1954
- Rev. Herbert H. Hellbusch, 1954–1960
- Rev. Walter A. Enge, 1960–1966
- Rev. Waldemar E. Meyer, 1966–1976
- Rev. Ralph Phipps, 1976–1985
- Rev. John Peterson, 1985–1993
- Rev. Roger L. Krause, 1993–2003
- Rev. Randall L. 'Randy' Golter, 2003–2012
- Rev. Allen Anderson, 2012–2018
- Rev. Roger Schlechte, 2018–2022
- Rev. James Maxwell, 2022–Present
