= Charles L. Coon =

American activist (1868–1927)

Charles Lee Coon (December 25, 1868 – 1927) was a teacher, school administrator, child labor reformer, and advocate for African American education. Coon was born near Lincolnton, North Carolina, and attended Concordia College in Conover, North Carolina. In addition to teaching, Coon worked as superintendent of Salisbury, North Carolina schools; North Carolina African American normal schools; and Wilson County, North Carolina schools. Coon was also involved in social welfare, serving as president of the Wilson Welfare League and secretary of the North Carolina Child Labor Committee.

Coon was directly involved in the founding and financing of the Negro Tuberculosis Sanatorium in Wilson, North Carolina. Coon's interests in history were focused on the history of education in North Carolina, and he published numerous articles on the subject. Coon was also well known for his controversial 1909 address, "Public Taxation and Negro Schools," which argued that education for African American school children was not a drain on white taxes.
