= Concordia College (North Carolina) =

Former college in Conover, North Carolina

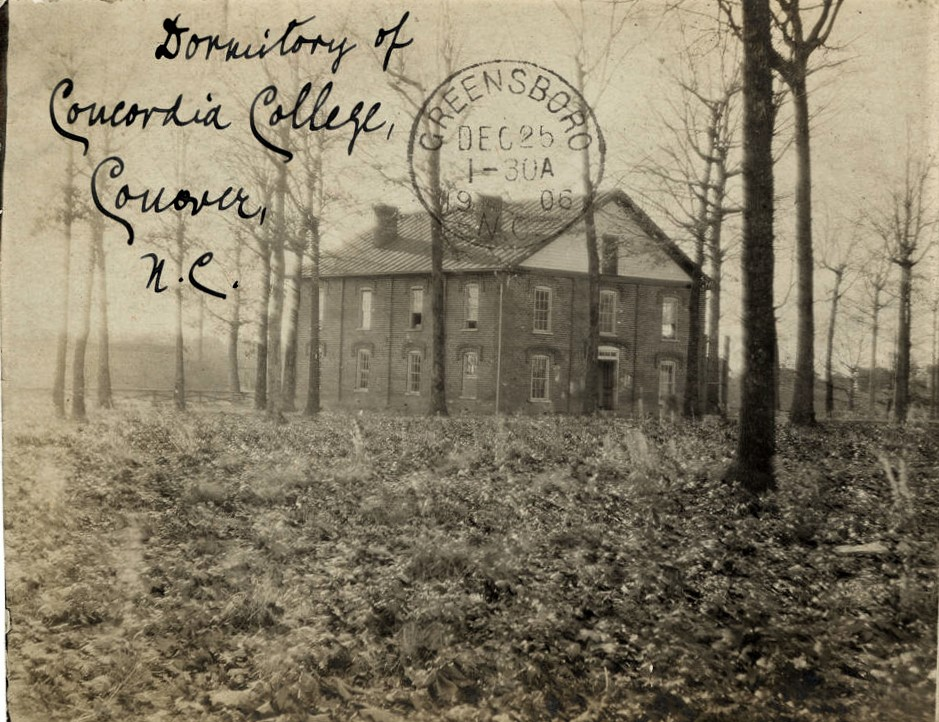
- Dormitory at Concordia College as shown in a postcard from about 1906
- Type: Private high school and junior college
- Active: 1878–1935
- Religious affiliation: Tennessee Synod {1881-1891} English Synod (1893-1911); LCMS (1911-1935)
- Location: Conover, North Carolina; 35°42′14″N 81°13′00″W

Concordia College was a Lutheran college and high school in Conover, North Carolina. Founded as a high school by members of the Evangelical Lutheran Tennessee Synod in 1878, it added college courses in 1881. The English Evangelical Lutheran Synod of Missouri and Other States took over control of the school in 1893. Control passed to the Lutheran Church–Missouri Synod when the English Synod merged with it in 1911. In April 1935, a fire destroyed the main building, and the school closed permanently at the end of the spring semester.

== Beginnings and high school ==
In the 1870s, Catawba County, North Carolina, was a major center of the Evangelical Lutheran Tennessee Synod, with 70 congregations and a total of 10,000 members. Many of the congregations had shared church buildings with congregations of the Reformed church for decades, and many of the Lutheran families sent their children to Catawba High School, a Reformed institution in Newton. However, a well-attended debate between Methodist minister Daniel May and Lutheran pastor J. M. Smith on the topic "Is Christ's Body Present in the Lord's Supper?" on August 7 and 8, 1874, aroused the desire of the Lutheran populace to establish Lutheran education in the area.

Efforts began that same year to establish a Lutheran high school. The Tennessee Synod agreed that the school should be established, but declined to offer any financial support. Lutheran pastor Polycarp Cyprian Henkel, a grandson of Paul Henkel, had in the years before the American Civil War advocated for a Lutheran school in the area. He had gone to Missouri to serve a group of Lutherans from North Carolina who had migrated there, but returned to his farm near Conover in April 1877 to further the establishment of the school. Three towns in Catawba County, namely, Conover, Hickory, and Newton, competed to be the site of the school. Conover was selected because its inhabitants had raised the most funds and offered a free site for the school. In addition, pastors Smith and Henkel both lived nearby, and the former had two sons of high school age. In appreciation for being selected, the people in Conover raised an additional $2,000.

The Concordia High School Association was officially formed on August 18, 1877. The name Concordia was chosen because while in Missouri, Henkel had come in contact with C. F. W. Walther and the Saxon German immigrants who had formed the German Evangelical Lutheran Synod of Missouri, Ohio, and Other States, known today as the Lutheran Church–Missouri Synod (LCMS). He was impressed with that synod's staunch adherence to the Lutheran Book of Concord and their frequent reference to it with the term Concordia.

The first session of Concordia High School began in March 1878, with 19 pupils and R. A. Yoder as the sole teacher. Classes were held at Yoder's home while the Administration and Educational Building was constructed at a cost of $4,000. The 4,050-square-foot (376 m^{2}) two-story frame structure had a square cross floorplan, and included an attic and a cupola. The first floor contained an assembly hall, a library, and a classroom, while the second floor housed four classrooms and a storeroom. The building, which was completed in time for the fall term that year, was situated on a four-acre (1.6 ha) portion of the 7 acres (2.8 ha) of donated land.

In 1881, a two-story boys dormitory was completed. The dormitory had eight bedrooms on the second floor and eight study rooms on the first.

== Establishment of the college ==
In 1881, the decision was made to add college courses for the preparation of Lutheran pastors. The North Carolina General Assembly passed an act of incorporation for the college in February 1881. After encountering difficulties raising the necessary funding, the association appealed to the Tennessee Synod for formal support. In return, the synod would be empowered to appoint the members of the college's board of trustees.

At its annual session in October 1883, the Tennessee Synod agreed to the give its "fostering care, influence, and moral support", although ownership of the college remained with the association. Henkel was appointed the first president in 1881 and served until he resigned in 1885 due to health issues. Professor J. C. Moser replaced Henkel as president of the college, and the Tennessee Synod agreed to pay $800 a year to help replace what had been Henkel's voluntary contributions as president and professor. In 1886, the college held its first commencement ceremony, the only graduate being David Polycarp Wike. His class originally had thirteen members, but the others had transferred to more established colleges in the area.

Beginning in about 1888, proposals to move the college to Hickory were discussed within the Tennessee Synod. Col. Walter W. Lenoir had offered land in Hickory to any group that would establish a Protestant college. In 1890, the faculty attempted to relocate the college, over the opposition of the association. Although the attempt was thwarted, most of the faculty resigned in order to establish Highland College, subsequently renamed Lenoir College and now known as Lenoir–Rhyne University, in Hickory. However, a clause in the faculty contracts required six months advance notice of resignation, so Concordia College was able to remain open, although the last two weeks of the 1891 spring semester, including final exams, had to be cancelled.

In order to keep the school open, the school hired two alumni, Charles L. Coon and M. H. Yount, to teach during the 1891–1892 school year. In late 1891, the association appealed to the English Evangelical Lutheran Synod of Missouri and Other States, which had been created as an offshoot of the Tennessee Synod, to provide replacement faculty and funding. William H. T. Dau was installed as president in May 1892. A graduate of Concordia Seminary of the LCMS in St. Louis, Missouri, Dau oversaw the linkage of the college with the seminary. The English Synod also supplied a second professor, G. A. Romoser. The 1893 convention of the English Synod formally took control the college as its own institution and appointed two additional professors, Charles L. Coon and L. Buchheimer, while at the same time urging that the Lutheran congregations in the area call their own pastors rather than relying on Dau and Romoser to fill those duties. It was also agreed that the college would provide a "full classical course" for men who would then attend Concordia Seminary in St. Louis or Concordia Theological Seminary in Springfield, Illinois, for theological training to become pastors. The college would also provide courses for men who could not attend one of those seminaries and who would become pastors upon graduation from Concordia College itself.

Even after the college courses had been added, the school had continued to conduct elementary school classes for the Lutheran families in the area. The English Synod required the grade school classes to be run by and funded by the local congregations, as was the case elsewhere in the synod. This was accomplished by 1895.

In 1911, the English Synod merged with the LCMS, and control of the English Synod's educational institutions, Concordia College and St. John's College, passed to the LCMS. Differences between the LCMS, which still used German in its colleges and seminaries, and local English-speaking supporters of Concordia College soon became apparent. The LCMS was focused on training young men to become pastors, while Lutherans in Catawba County wanted an institution that would also educate their sons and their daughters for secular careers. The LCMS initially discontinued the upper two grades from 1911 to 1916, reducing Concordia to a high school. However, by 1919, not only had college status been restored, but programs in such non-theological topics as French, "mental science", "moral science", and pedagogy were being offered.

== Fire and closure ==
The status of Concordia College varied, depending on attendance, economic conditions, and war, from being the equivalent of a high school to being a junior college. Several times the synod considered merging its preparatory colleges to one location. In response to one such proposal in 1918, the local supporters of the college raised the funds to construct a girls' dormitory and a professor's house without any financial support from the synod.

Total enrollment, including high school classes, peaked at about 100 students, but began declining due to the Great Depression. In the early 1930s, the LCMS created a committee to again investigate closing one or more of its three junior colleges.

Early in the morning of April 16, 1935, a fire broke out in the Administration Building. Efforts to put out the fire were futile, although the piano and a number of books were rescued by the efforts of the faculty and neighbors. The building itself was destroyed.

Initially the LCMS pledged $95,000, later increased to $105,000, to build a new fireproof building. However, no funds were ever actually appropriated. Instead, the synod decided to close the college rather than rebuild it because the LCMS itself was experiencing difficulties placing the pastors coming out of its seminaries with congregations that could afford to pay them. Classes for the remainder of the semester were conducted in the church building, dormitories, and various homes. The final commencement ceremony was held for the five high school and two college graduates. During its history, the college graduated 52 Lutheran pastors as well as a large number of local residents.

In 1944, Concordia Lutheran Church, whose church building was located across the street from the school site, bought the campus from the LCMS for $5,000. The congregation had begun in 1878 as a group of Conover Lutherans worshiping in the assembly hall of the Administration Building. The congregation demolished the only remaining building on the campus, the boy's dormitory, and turned the campus into Concordia Park. Sunday evening drive-in "Open Air Gospel Services" were held in the park starting in 1947. In 1957, the congregation started construction in the park of its current church building; the structure was completed in 1958.

== Presidents ==
Concordia College had ten presidents during its existence:

- Polycarp C. Henkel (1881–1885)
- J. C. Moser (1885–1888)
- R. A. Yoder (1888–1889)
- No president (1890–1892)
- William H. T. Dau (1892–1899)
- George A. Romoser (1899–1911)
- C. A. Weiss (1911–1912)
- Ad Haentzschel (1912)
- H. B. Hemmeter (1913–1917)
- Oswald W. Kreinheder (1917–1928)
- C. O. Smith (1928–1930)
- H. B. Hemmeter (1930–1935)
