= Michigan District of the Lutheran Church – Missouri Synod =

Subdivision of Christian denomination in the U.S.

Michigan District of the LCMS

Location
- Country: United States
- Territory: Michigan excluding the western half of the Upper Peninsula
- Headquarters: Ann Arbor, Michigan

Statistics
- Congregations: 351
- Schools: 131 early childhood centers; 68 elementary; 5 secondary
- Members: 152,000

Information
- Denomination: Lutheran Church – Missouri Synod
- Established: 1854 (as the Northern District)

Current leadership
- President: Rev. David A. Davis

Website
- www.michigandistrict.org

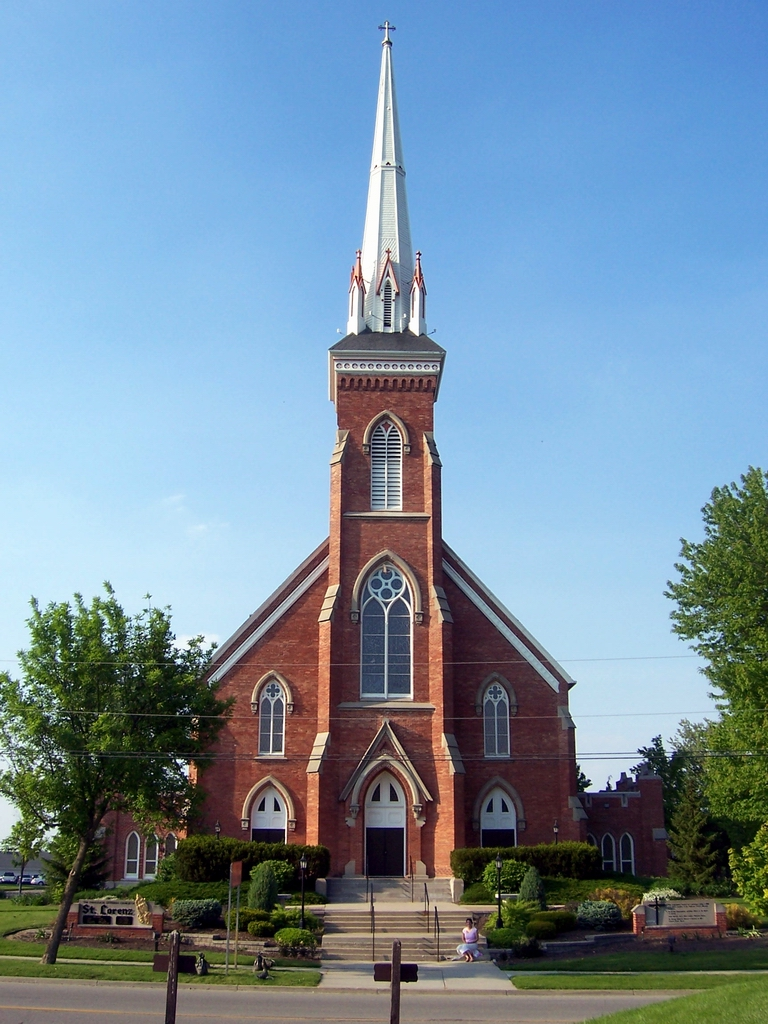
Saint Lorenz Lutheran Church in Frankenmuth, Michigan; the largest congregation in the Michigan District

The Michigan District is one of the 35 districts of the Lutheran Church – Missouri Synod (LCMS), and comprises the U.S. state of Michigan with the exception of the western half of the Upper Peninsula, which is in the North Wisconsin District. In addition, nineteen Michigan congregations are in the non-geographic English District. As of 2023, the Michigan District includes approximately 351 congregations and missions, subdivided into 41 circuits, as well as 131 early childhood centers, 68 elementary schools, and 5 high schools. Baptized membership in district congregations is approximately 152,000. It is by far the largest of the synod's districts, exceeding the size of the next largest district by 40,000 members ([Central Illinois District of the Lutheran Church – Missouri Synod|Northern Illinois District]]) and by 9 congregations (Texas District).

The Michigan District is the renamed remnant of what was originally called the Northern District, one of the Synod's four original districts formed in 1854. The Wisconsin and Minnesota portions of the district were separated in 1875, creating the Northwestern District. From 1875 to 1879, Ontario was included in the Northern District, but it was split off to form the Canada District. The Northern District was renamed the Michigan District in 1881.

District offices are located in Ann Arbor, Michigan. Delegates from each congregation meet in convention every three years to elect the district president, vice presidents, circuit counselors, a board of directors, and other officers. The Rev. David A. Davis was elected president of the district at the 2022 District Convention, succeeding the Rev. Dr. David P. E. Maier. The 103rd Regular Convention was held on June 26-28, 2022 at Concordia University, Ann Arbor with the theme "People of Hope ... It's Time!" (from 2 Corinthians 6:2b).

Concordia University, Ann Arbor, part of the LCMS Concordia University System, is located within the district.

== Presidents ==
- Rev. Ottomar Fuerbringer, 1854–1872
- Rev. J. A. Hügli, 1872–1875
- Rev. Ottomar Fuerbringer, 1875–1882
- Rev. M. J. Schmidt, 1882–1891
- Rev. Gustav Ernst Spiegel, 1891–1912
- Rev. T. E. W. Engelder, 1912–1914
- Rev. Emanuel August Mayer, 1915–1924
- Rev. John Jacob Frederick Schinnerer, 1924–1942
- Rev. Andrew Zeile, 1942–1957
- Rev. W. Harry Krieger, 1957–1965
- Rev. Edwin C. Weber, 1965–1969
- Rev. Richard L. Schlecht, 1969–1985
- Rev. John L. Heins, 1985–1997
- Rev. C. William Hoesman, 1997–2009
- Rev. Dr. David P.E. Maier, 2009–2022
- Rev. David A. Davis, 2022–present
