= North Dakota District of the Lutheran Church – Missouri Synod =

Subdivision of Christian denomination in the U.S.

North Dakota District of the LCMS

Location
- Country: United States
- Territory: North Dakota
- Headquarters: Fargo

Statistics
- Congregations: 76
- Schools: 2 preschool; 2 elementary
- Members: 22,000

Information
- Denomination: Lutheran Church – Missouri Synod
- Established: 1945

Current leadership
- President: Rev. Mark Chepulis

Map
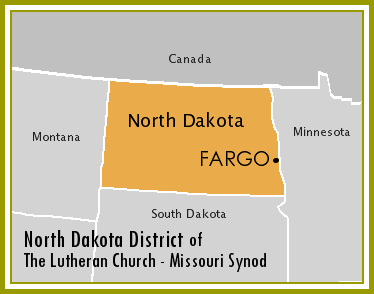

Website
- www.nodak.lcms.org

The North Dakota District is one of the 35 districts of the Lutheran Church – Missouri Synod (LCMS), and consists of congregations throughout the state of North Dakota. The North Dakota District includes approximately 76 congregations, subdivided into 6 circuits, as well as 2 preschools and 2 elementary schools. Baptized membership in district congregations is approximately 22,000.

The North Dakota District was formed in 1945 when the North Dakota and Montana District was divided, also creating the Montana District. The district office are located in Fargo, North Dakota. Delegates from each congregation meet in convention every three years to elect the district president, vice presidents, circuit visitors, a board of directors, and other officers. Rev. Mark Chepulis was elected district president in 2025.

== Presidents ==
- Rev. Arnold Henry Grumm, 1945–1950
- Rev. Walter Henry Theodore Cordts, 1950–1954
- Rev. Bernhard G. Mueller, 1954–1957
- Rev. Lothar Karl Meyer, 1957–1961
- Rev. Harold V. Huber, 1961–1965
- Rev. John D. Fritz, 1965–1967
- Rev. Alwin M. Reimnitz, 1967–1991
- Rev. Norman C. Sincebaugh, 1991–2000
- Rev. Larry S. Harvala, 2000–2008
- Rev. Patrick O'Brien, 2008–2009
- Rev. James Baneck, 2009–2016
- Rev. Arie Bertsch, 2017–2024
- Rev. Mark Chepulis, 2025-Present
