= Alvin L. Barry =

President of Lutheran Church - Missouri Synod (1992-2001)

- Born: August 4, 1931; Woodbine, Iowa
- Died: March 23, 2001 (aged 69); St. Louis, Missouri
- Education: Concordia Seminary
- Church: Lutheran Church–Missouri Synod (LCMS)
- Ordained: June 29, 1958
- Offices held: President, LCMS (1992-2001)

Alvin L. Barry (August 4, 1931, Woodbine, Iowa – March 23, 2001, St. Louis, Missouri) was the 10th president of the Lutheran Church–Missouri Synod (LCMS), serving from 1992 until his death. He is the only president of the LCMS to die in office. He previously served as president of the synod's Iowa District East from 1982 to 1992.

== Works ==
Barry authored The Master's Prayer: Devotional Meditations on the Lord's Prayer (1994), The Unchanging Feast: The Nature and Basis of Lutheran Worship (1995), What Does This Mean? Catechesis in the Lutheran Congregation (1996), and numerous pamphlets in the “What About?” series. The "What About?" booklets attempts to answer, from a confessional Lutheran perspective, questions that people have about the Christian faith.

Religious titles
Preceded by Ralph A. Bohlmann	President; Lutheran Church–Missouri Synod; 1992–2001	Succeeded by Robert T. Kuhn
