= Districts of the Lutheran Church – Missouri Synod =

Subdivision level of Christian denomination in the U.S.

The Lutheran Church – Missouri Synod (LCMS) is organized into 35 districts, 33 of which are defined along geographic lines and two that are non-geographical. Each district has a president who oversees the congregations in his district, which are further subdivided into local circuits. The position of synod president is analogous to the role of bishop in many other church bodies. But the LCMS supports a synodical polity (political / governing organization), which combines the commonly used church body systems of congregationalist polity and episcopal polity, as opposed to an exclusively episcopal polity / ierarchical governance (such as used in the Roman Catholic Church, Eastern Orthodoxy, Anglicanism / Anglican Communion and even many other Evangelical Lutheran churches, and some other Protestant churches in North America and throughout the world).

Each LCMS district chooses its own president from among the pastors of the district at its triennial convention. In many districts the district president occupies a full-time position, while in others he continues to serve as pastor in a local congregation or specialized ministry (hospitals, military chaplains, colleges / universities, social services agencies, etc.)

The 35 district presidents plus the synod general president form the Council of Presidents (COP), one of whose duties is to place graduates from the two LCMS theological seminaries as pastors in congregations that have requested such a candidate. If a congregation desires an experienced pastor to fill a vacancy, the district president may suggest a list of possible candidates (gleaned from interactions with the COP as well as other sources), but the district president does not assign pastors in this case; the congregation extends a "call" directly to the pastor.

== History ==
From its founding in 1847 until 1854, the LCMS held annual synod-wide conventions. However, given the rapid growth in the number of congregations and the large geographic area covered by the synod (from Iowa in the west to western New York in the northeast, and from Minnesota in the northwest to Louisiana in the south), a new synodical constitution was adopted in the latter year that split the synod into four geographical districts (Eastern, Western, Northern, and Central), each with its own annual convention and officers. The intent was to provide for more cooperation among congregations and pastors within the smaller geography grouping. It would also take over some of the responsibilities of the general synod and enable more ministry, service and outreach to be made. These original four districts were further divided in subsequent years, resulting in the current 33 geographical districts.

The two non-geographical districts, the English and the SELC, are the result of smaller church bodies merging into the LCMS.

== List of districts ==
The following is a chronological list of former and current districts of the LCMS. Former district names are in italics.

District Name	Year Created	Parent District	Additional information
Central	1854	One of original four districts	Initially contained congregations in Indiana and Ohio. The district was divided into the Indiana and Ohio districts in 1962/1963.
Eastern	1854	One of original four districts	Initially contained congregations in New York, Pennsylvania, Maryland, and Washington, D.C. Later the province of Ontario in Canada was added, but was then transferred to the Northern district in 1874. In 1906 the Atlantic district was split off. The district now includes only western New York state and most of Pennsylvania.
Northern	1854	One of original four districts	Initially contained congregations in Michigan and Wisconsin. The Northwestern district was split off in 1874/1875, at which time the province of Ontario in Canada was moved from the Eastern district to the redefined Northern district. The Canadian district was split off three years later in 1878/1879, The Northern district was renamed the Michigan district in 1881.
Western	1854	One of original four districts	Initially contained congregations in Missouri, Illinois, and Louisiana, with other states added later as congregations were established. The Illinois district separated in 1874, the Iowa district in 1878/1879, the Nebraska and Southern districts in 1881/1882, and the Kansas district and the California and Oregon district in 1887. The district was divided into the Missouri and Mid-South districts in 1965/1966.
Illinois	1874	Western	Divided into the Northern Illinois, Central Illinois, and Southern Illinois districts in 1907/1908.
Northwestern	1874/1875	Northern	Initially contained congregations in Wisconsin and Minnesota. Split into the Wisconsin district and the Minnesota and Dakota district in 1881/1882.
Canada	1878/1879	Northern	Renamed the Ontario district in 1923.
Iowa	1878/1879	Western	Divided into the Eastern Iowa and Western Iowa districts in 1936.
Michigan	1881	Northern	Renamed from the Northern district. It does not include the western half of the Upper Peninsula of Michigan.
Minnesota and Dakota	1881/1882	Northwestern	The South Dakota district was split out in 1905/1906, and the North Dakota and Montana district in 1910. The district was renamed the Minnesota district in 1912, and the Alberta and British Columbia and the Manitoba and Saskatchewan districts were split off in 1920. The district was divided into the Minnesota North and Minnesota South districts in 1962/1963.
Nebraska	1881/1882	Western	The district was divided into the Northern Nebraska and Southern Nebraska districts in 1922, but those districts merged in 1970 to reform the Nebraska district.
Southern	1881/1882	Western	Initially contained congregations in Texas, Louisiana, and adjoining states. The Texas district was split out in 1905/1906, and the Florida-Georgia district in 1947/1948. It now consists of the states of Louisiana, Mississippi, and Alabama, and the western Florida Panhandle.
Wisconsin	1881/1882	Northwestern	The district was divided into the North Wisconsin and South Wisconsin districts in 1916.
Kansas	1887	Western	Initially contained congregations in Kansas and Colorado. The Colorado district was split off in 1920/1921, leaving only the states of Kansas, Oklahoma, and New Mexico. The Oklahoma district was split off in 1923/1924
California and Oregon	1887	Western	The district was divided into the California and Nevada district and the Oregon and Washington district in 1899.
California and Nevada	1899	California and Oregon	The Southern California district was split from the district in 1929/1930. The district was renamed the California-Nevada-Hawaii district in 1977.
Oregon and Washington	1899	California and Oregon	The district was renamed the Northwest district in 1948.
Brazil	1904		Initially contained congregations in the country of Brazil. Congregations in Argentina were added in 1905. The Argentina district was then later split off in 1926/1927. The Brazil district became the independent Evangelical Lutheran Church of Brazil (Igreja Evangelica Luterana do Brasil) on January 1, 1980.
South Dakota	1905/1906	Minnesota and South Dakota	
Texas	1905/1906	Southern	The state of Texas except for far western El Paso county.
Atlantic	1906	Eastern	Initially included the part of the state of New York east of a boundary running between Rome and Utica, along with all of the region of New England and the state of New Jersey. The latter were later split off into the current separate New England and New Jersey districts, respectively, in 1971/1972, leaving the southeastern half of New York state, i.e., New York City, Long Island, the Hudson River Valley, and the Capital District (around the state capital city of Albany, New York).
Central Illinois	1907/1908	Illinois	
Northern Illinois	1907/1908	Illinois	
Southern Illinois	1907/1908	Illinois	
North Dakota and Montana	1910	Minnesota and Dakota	The district was divided into the North Dakota and the Montana districts in 1944/1945.
English	1911	English Synod	Originally the district contained the congregations of the English Evangelical Lutheran Synod of Missouri and Other States, which merged into the LCMS in 1911 as a non-geographic district.
Minnesota	1912	Minnesota and Dakota	Renamed. The Alberta and British Columbia and the Manitoba and Saskatchewan districts were split of in 1920.
North Wisconsin	1916	Wisconsin	
South Wisconsin	1916	Wisconsin	
Colorado	1920/1921	Kansas	Initially included congregations in the states of Colorado and Utah. Congregations in Page, Arizona, Venango, Nebraska, and El Paso County, Texas were added later. New Mexico congregations of the Texas and other districts were added in 1941/1942. Renamed to the Rocky Mountain district in 1983.
Alberta and British Columbia	1920	Minnesota	The district was one of three that were released from the LCMS in 1988 to form the Lutheran Church – Canada.
Manitoba and Saskatchewan	1920	Minnesota	The district was one of three that were released from the LCMS in 1988 to form the Lutheran Church – Canada.
Northern Nebraska	1922	Nebraska	The Wyoming district was split off and the Northern Nebraska district merged with the Southern Nebraska district, both actions in 1970 to form a new single Nebraska district.
Southern Nebraska	1922	Nebraska	The district merged with the Northern Nebraska district in 1970 to form a new single Nebraska district.
Ontario	1923	Canada	Renamed. The district was one of three districts that were released from the LCMS in 1988 to form the Lutheran Church – Canada.
Oklahoma	1923/1924	Kansas	
Argentina	1926/1927	Brazil	The Argentina district of the LCMS became the independent Evangelical Lutheran Church of Argentina (Iglesia Evangelica Luterana Argentina) on August 1, 1986.
Southern California	1929/1930	California and Nevada	Renamed to the Pacific Southwest district in 1989.
Iowa East	1936	Iowa	
Iowa West	1936	Iowa	
Southeastern	1938/1939	Eastern, English	Initially included congregations in the states of South Carolina, North Carolina, Virginia, Delaware, part of Georgia, along with Washington, D.C., and York and Adams counties in south-central Pennsylvania.
Montana	1944/1945	North Dakota and Montana	Besides the state of Montana, includes one congregation each in neighboring Idaho to the west and North Dakota to the east.
North Dakota	1944/1945	North Dakota and Montana	Consists of the state of North Dakota (except for one congregation} and one congregation in South Dakota.
Florida-Georgia	1947/1948	Southern	Consists of the states of Florida (except for the western Florida Panhandle) and Georgia.
Northwest	1948	Oregon and Washington	Renamed. Consists of the states of Washington, Oregon, Idaho, and Alaska.
Indiana	1962/1963	Central	Includes the state of Indiana and most of western Kentucky.
Minnesota North	1962/1963	Minnesota	
Minnesota South	1962/1963	Minnesota	
Ohio	1962/1963	Central	Includes the states of Ohio and West Virginia and the eastern part of Kentucky.
Missouri	1965/1966	Western	
Mid-South	1965/1966	Western	Includes the states of Arkansas, Tennessee, and the southwestern part of Kentucky.
Wyoming	1970	Northern Nebraska	Includes the state of Wyoming and the western Nebraska Panhandle, as well as one congregation in neighboring northwestern Colorado.
SELC	1971	Synod of Evangelical Lutheran Churches	Originally the district contained the congregations of the Synod of Evangelical Lutheran Churches, which merged into the LCMS in 1971 as a non-geographic district.
New England	1971/1972	Atlantic	
New Jersey	1971/1972	Atlantic	
California–Nevada–Hawaii	1977	California and Nevada	Renamed. Consists of the states of California (except for the southernmost eight counties), Nevada (except for Clark County), and Hawaii.
Rocky Mountain	1983	Colorado	Renamed. Includes the states of Colorado (except for one congregation in northwestern corner of the state that is in the Wyoming district), Utah, and New Mexico, and also El Paso County in the far western corner of Texas.
Pacific Southwest	1989	Southern California	Renamed. Includes the state of Arizona, the southernmost eight counties of California, and Clark County, Nevada.
