= Montana District of the Lutheran Church – Missouri Synod =

Subdivision of Christian denomination in the U.S.

Montana District of the LCMS
- Montana District Seal

Location
- Country: United States
- Territory: Montana
- Headquarters: Billings, Montana

Statistics
- Congregations: 87
- Schools: 18 preschool; 7 elementary
- Members: 15,000

Information
- Denomination: Lutheran Church – Missouri Synod
- Established: 1945

Current leadership
- President: Rev. Terry R. Forke

Website
- www.mtdistlcms.org

The Montana District is one of the 35 districts of the Lutheran Church – Missouri Synod (LCMS), and comprises the state of Montana and parts of Idaho and North Dakota. The Montana District includes approximately 69 congregations and missions (including two congregations in Idaho and one in North Dakota) as well as 16 preschools and 5 elementary schools and is subdivided into 6 circuits. Baptized membership in district congregations is approximately 15,000, making it one of the two smallest districts along with the Wyoming District, which is roughly equal in size; a merger of the two districts was proposed in 2006.

The Montana District was formed in 1945 when the North Dakota and Montana District was divided, also creating the North Dakota District. District offices are located in Billings, Montana. Delegates from each congregation meet in convention every three years to elect the district president, vice presidents, circuit visitors, a board of directors, and other officers. The Rev. Terry Forke became the district president in September 2006.

== Presidents ==
- Rev. Paul M. Freiburger, 1945–1966
- Rev. August F. Droegemueller, 1966–1969
- Rev. George F. Wollenburg, 1969–1977
- Rev. Harold V. Huber, 1977–1984 (died in office)
- Rev. Albert G. Pullmann, 1984–1989
- Rev. Richard Kiessling, 1989–1992
- Rev. George F. Wollenburg, 1992–2006
- Rev. Terry R. Forke, 2006–2025
- Rev. Ryan Wendt, 2025–present
