= Ralph Bohlmann =

- Born: February 20, 1932; Palisade, Nebraska, U.S.
- Died: July 24, 2016 (aged 84); St. Louis, Missouri, U.S.
- Education: Concordia Seminary
- Church: Lutheran Church–Missouri Synod (LCMS)
- Ordained: June 29, 1958
- Offices held: President, LCMS (1981-1992); President, Concordia Seminary (1975-1981)

Ralph Arthur Bohlmann (February 20, 1932 – July 24, 2016) was the ninth president of the Lutheran Church–Missouri Synod (LCMS), serving four terms from 1981 until 1992. Bohlmann graduated from Concordia Seminary, St. Louis, in 1956 and was ordained on June 29, 1958, in Des Moines, Iowa, by his father, the Rev. Arthur E. Bohlmann. He later received his Ph.D. from Yale University.

From 1958 to 1960, Bohlmann served Mt. Olive Lutheran Church in Des Moines. In 1961, he accepted a call to be the assistant pastor at Grace Lutheran Church in Pagedale, Missouri, where he served until 1971. Bohlmann also taught at Concordia College, Milwaukee, from 1957 to 1958. In 1960, he became a professor at Concordia Seminary, St. Louis, and in 1975, he became president of the school, serving in that capacity until his election in 1981.

Bohlmann was a member of the LCMS Commission on Theology and Church Relations from 1965 to 1981, serving as the commission's executive secretary from 1971 to 1974. He also served on the ALC-LCMS Commission on Fellowship from 1969 to 1981. He had also worked for the Division of Theological Studies of the Lutheran Council in the U.S.A. and participated in various national inter-confessional/inter-Lutheran dialogues.

Bohlmann died in St. Louis, Missouri on July 24, 2016, at the age of 84.

Religious titles
Preceded by J. A. O. Preus II	President; Lutheran Church–Missouri Synod; 1981–1992	Succeeded by Alvin L. Barry
