= Minnesota North District of the Lutheran Church – Missouri Synod =

Subdivision of Christian denomination in the U.S.

Minnesota North District of the LCMS

Location
- Country: United States
- Territory: Northern two-thirds of Minnesota
- Headquarters: Brainerd, Minnesota

Statistics
- Congregations: 198
- Schools: 19 preschool; 8 elementary
- Members: 46,944

Information
- Denomination: Lutheran Church – Missouri Synod
- Established: 1963

Current leadership
- President: Rev. Brady L. Finnern

Website
- www.mnnlcms.org/home

The Minnesota North District is one of the 35 districts of the Lutheran Church – Missouri Synod (LCMS), and covers the northern two-thirds of the state of Minnesota; it also includes two congregations in Wisconsin and one in South Dakota. The Minnesota North District includes 197 congregations, subdivided into 18 circuits, as well as 19 Lutheran preschools and 7 Lutheran elementary schools. Baptized membership in district congregations is approximately 46,944.

The Minnesota North District was formed in 1963 when the Minnesota District was divided. District offices are located in Baxter, Minnesota. Delegates from each congregation meet in convention every three years to elect the district president, vice presidents, circuit visitors, board of directors, and other officers. The Rev. Brady Finnern has been the district president since 2022.

== Presidents ==
- Rev. Alfred C. Seltz, 1963–1970
- Rev. August T. Mennicke, 1970–1986
- Rev. Richard L. Guehna, 1986–1996 (died in office)
- Rev. David P. Strohschein, 1996–1997 (acting president)
- Rev. David A. Bode, 1997–2003
- Rev. Donald J. Fondow, 2003–2022
- Rev. Brady L. Finnern, 2022–present
