= Evangelical Lutheran Tennessee Synod =

Defunct Christian denomination in the United States

- Abbreviation: Tennessee Synod
- Classification: Lutheran
- Associations: United Synod of the Evangelical Lutheran Church in the South
- Region: United States
- Origin: 1820
- Separations: Evangelical Lutheran Holston Synod (1860)
- Merged into: United Synod of North Carolina (1920)
- Ministers: 40 (1919)

The Evangelical Lutheran Tennessee Synod (1820–1920), commonly known as just the Tennessee Synod, was a Lutheran church body known for its staunch adherence to the Augsburg Confession and commitment to confessional Lutheranism. The synod began with six ministers in 1820 and had forty by 1919, plus ten students and candidates for ministry. It merged into the United Synod of North Carolina in 1920.

== History ==
Most of the synod's congregations were in western North Carolina and eastern Tennessee until 1860, when the congregations in Tennessee, under the leadership of Abel J. Brown, formed the Evangelical Lutheran Holston Synod. However the Tennessee Synod kept its name, and so after 1860, it had congregations in Virginia, North and South Carolina, and Alabama, but none in Tennessee. In 1886 the Tennessee Synod (along with the Holston Synod and other southern synods) joined the United Synod of the Evangelical Lutheran Church in the South, paving the way for the Tennessee Synod's merger into the United Synod of North Carolina in 1920, which ended the Tennessee Synod's history as a separate body.

The Tennessee Synod is probably best known for producing the first English translation of the Book of Concord (the confessions of the Lutheran church), published in 1851 by the Henkel Press of New Market, Virginia. In addition, though not widely known, the Tennessee Synod helped found Lenoir–Rhyne University in Hickory, North Carolina, a private, four-year liberal arts college. The first president of the university, Robert Anderson Yoder, was the Tennessee Synod's first student beneficiary of scholarship funds.

== Theology ==
The Tennessee Synod's defining characteristic was its confessionalism. The synod's ministers were labeled "Henkelites" and lambasted by their opponents. "Henkelites" is a reference to the fact that Paul Henkel and his sons were synod leaders and printer of all synod materials, so the Henkel name was well known. They had a strict standard of Lutheran orthodoxy which kept them from joining with other Lutherans in surrounding states for several generations, but the number of churches in Virginia and North and South Carolina grew in later decades as the body developed into more general Lutheranism. The churches were chiefly rural and small, with many just being established and built in this period. They were especially opposed to the General Synod (see Bente below).

In a tribute to their confessional character, C. F. W. Walther in Der Lutheraner of January, 1849 stated "… this Synod belongs to the small number of those who are determined not only to be called Lutherans, but also to be and to remain Lutherans." But unity was never established with the Lutheran Church–Missouri Synod (LCMS) due to geographic and linguistic separation, the Civil War, and the Tennessee Synod's drift toward union with the more latitudinarian North Carolina synod in the 1880s. However, the Tennessee Synod's English (Evangelical) Lutheran Conference of Missouri applied for admission to the LCMS as a district in 1887, but was advised by Walther to instead form a separate English-language synod. The resulting English Evangelical Lutheran Synod of Missouri and Other States eventually merged into the LCMS as its English District in 1911.

The constitution of the United Synod of the South was variously interpreted by member synods who took differing stands on the Four Points during the 1890s, and the conservative position originally held by the Tennessee Synod was first given several exceptions and finally abandoned altogether with the 1920 merger.

== Bibliography ==
Pro-Henkelite:

- Henkel, Socrates (1890). History of the Evangelical Lutheran Tennessee Synod. New Market: Henkel & Co. Printers and Publishers. ISBN 9780524028278. This includes the annual convention minutes until the mid-1880s.
- Bente, F. (1919). American Lutheranism, Volume I: Early History of American Lutheranism and the Tennessee Synod. St. Louis: Concordia Publishing House. pp. 148-237
- Bente, F. (1919). American Lutheranism: Volume II: The United Lutheran Church. St. Louis: Concordia Publishing House. pp, 228-243

Anti-Henkelite (these three books talk about the first decades of the Synod only):

- Schmucker, S.S. (1852). American Lutheran Church. Philadelphia: E. W. Miller, Ranstead Place. pp. 215-226
- Hazelius, Ernest L. (1846). History of the American Lutheran Church. Zanesville: Edwin C. Church. pp. 149-152, 222, 281
- Bernheim, G. D. (1872). History of the German Settlements and the Lutheran Church in North and South Carolina. Philadelphia: The Lutheran Book Store. pp. 440-445, 485-488

Neutral

- Cassell, C.W.; Fink, W.J.; Henkel, Elon O. (1930). History of the Lutheran Church in Virginia and East Tennessee. Strasburg, VA: Shenandoah Publishing House, Inc. pp. 48–55, 133–144.
- Minutes of the Annual Conventions of the Tennessee Lutheran Evangelical Synod 1876 - 1884. Durham, NC: Duke University Library. 1820.
- Robinson, Evelyn. (2013). History of Rev. John Anderson Rudisill & Family, N. C. Evangelical Lutheran Circuit Rider. Charlotte: Paul's Hope, Inc.
- "Lenoir-Rhyne University Historical Introduction" (PDF). Lenoir-Rhyne University. 2012. Archived from the original (PDF) on 2011-11-26.
