= SELC District of the Lutheran Church – Missouri Synod =

Non-geographical subdivision of Christian denomination in the U.S.

SELC District of the LCMS

Location
- Country: United States and Canada
- Territory: Nongeographic
- Headquarters: Macungie, Pennsylvania

Statistics
- Congregations: 52
- Schools: 13 preschool; 4 elementary
- Members: 13,876 communicant; 11,239 baptized

Information
- Denomination: Lutheran Church – Missouri Synod
- Established: 1971

Current leadership
- President: Rev. Waldemar R. Vinovskis

Map
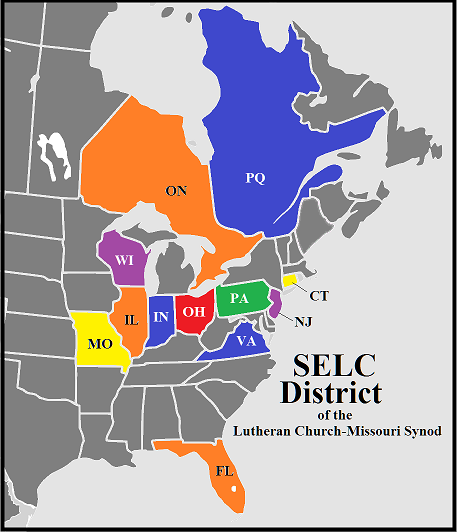

Website
- selc.lcms.org

The SELC District is one of the 35 districts of the Lutheran Church – Missouri Synod (LCMS). It is one of the Synod's two non-geographical districts, along with the English District, and has its origins in the congregations of the former Slovak Evangelical Lutheran Church (SELC), which merged with the LCMS in 1971. The SELC had been formed in 1902 in Connellsville, Pennsylvania, and had changed its name to the Synod of Evangelical Lutheran Churches in 1959 due to decreasing identification with the Slovak language and culture.

Spread over 11 U.S. states (Florida, Maine, Missouri, New Jersey, Ohio, Pennsylvania, Virginia, Wisconsin, Indiana, Illinois, and Connecticut) and the Canadian provinces of Ontario and Quebec, the great majority of congregations are in the Great Lakes and Mid-Atlantic regions. The district now includes approximately 52 congregations and missions (the fewest of any LCMS district), subdivided into 4 circuits, as well as 13 preschools and 4 elementary schools. As of 2021, baptized membership in district congregations was 13,876, and communicant membership was 11,239.

SELC District offices are located in Macungie, Pennsylvania. Delegates from each congregation meet in convention every three years to elect the district president, vice presidents, circuit visitors, a board of directors, and other officers. Waldemar R. Vinovskis is the current district president, elected to his first term in 2018.

== Presidents ==
- Albert M. Marcis, 1972–1997
- Carl H. Krueger Jr., 1997–2015
- Andrew J. Dzurovcik, 2015–2018
- Waldemar R. Vinovskis, 2018–present
