= South Wisconsin District of the Lutheran Church – Missouri Synod =

Subdivision of Christian denomination in the U.S.

South Wisconsin District of the LCMS

Location
- Country: United States
- Territory: Southern third of Wisconsin
- Headquarters: Milwaukee, Wisconsin

Statistics
- Congregations: 199
- Schools: 23 preschool; 51 elementary; 8 secondary
- Members: 82,600

Information
- Denomination: Lutheran Church – Missouri Synod
- Established: 1916

Current leadership
- President: Rev. Dr. Nathan Meador

Website
- www.swd.lcms.org

The South Wisconsin District, formed in 1916 when the Wisconsin District was divided, is one of 35 districts of the Lutheran Church – Missouri Synod (LCMS). Covering the southern third of the state of Wisconsin, the District serves the 82,600 baptized members in 199 churches, 23 preschools, 51 elementary schools, 8 high schools, and 1 university. (Concordia University Wisconsin in Mequon, part of the LCMS' Concordia University System, is located within the district.)

District offices are located in Milwaukee, Wisconsin. Delegates from each congregation meet in convention every three years to elect the district president, vice presidents, circuit counselors, a board of directors, and other officers.

== Presidents ==
- Rev. Edward Albrecht, 1916–1921 (Pastor, Nazareth/Milwaukee)
- Rev. Henry John Andrew Grueber, 1921–1932 (Pastor, Trinity/Milwaukee)
- Rev. John Frederick Boerger, 1932–1936 (Pastor, St. John/Racine)
- Rev. Fred A. Schwertfeger, 1936–1948 (Pastor, St. Stephen/Horicon)
- Rev. Arthur H. Oswald, 1948–1953 (Pastor, St. Martini/Milwaukee)
- Rev. Herbert W. Baxmann, 1953–1970 (Pastor, St. John/Plymouth; became district's first full-time president in 1963)
- Rev. Karl L. Barth, 1970–1982 (Pastor, St. Paul/West Allis)
- Rev. Harvey Krueger, 1982–1988 (Pastor, Trinity/Sheboygan)
- Rev. Edwin S. Suelflow, 1988–1994 (Pastor, Walther Memorial/Milwaukee)
- Rev. Ronald E. Meyer, 1994–2006 (Stewardship Executive, South Wisconsin District)
- Rev. John C. Wille, 2006–2024 (Pastor, Good Shepherd/Tomah)
- Rev. Eric Skovgaard, 2024–2025 (Pastor, Elm Grove/Elm Grove)
- Rev. Dr. Nathan Meador, 2025– (Mission Executive, South Wisconsin District)
