= English District of the Lutheran Church – Missouri Synod =

Non-geographical subdivision of Christian denomination in the U.S.

English District of the LCMS

Location
- Country: United States and Canada
- Territory: Non-geographic
- Headquarters: Farmington, Michigan

Statistics
- Congregations: 158
- Schools: 38 preschool; 17 elementary; 2 secondary
- Members: 36,043

Information
- Denomination: Lutheran Church – Missouri Synod
- Established: 1911

Current leadership
- Bishop: Rev. Jeffrey Miskus

Map
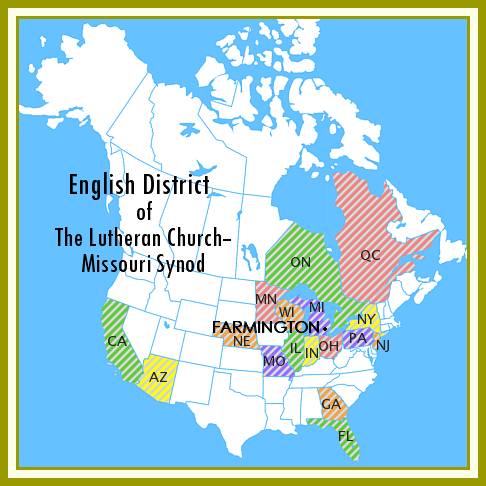

Website
- www.englishdistrict.org

The English District is one of the 35 districts of the Lutheran Church – Missouri Synod (LCMS). It is one of the Synod's two non-geographical districts, along with the SELC District. The district presently has congregations in the states of Arizona, California, Florida, Georgia, Idaho, Illinois, Indiana, Kentucky, Michigan, Minnesota, Missouri, Nebraska, Nevada, New Jersey, New York, Ohio, Pennsylvania, Texas, Utah, Virginia, Washington, West Virginia, and Wisconsin, as well as the Canadian province of Ontario.

The district has its origins in the congregations of the former English Evangelical Lutheran Synod of Missouri and Other States, which merged with the LCMS in 1911. The English Synod had been formally organized in 1888 out of the English (Evangelical) Lutheran Conference of Missouri of the Evangelical Lutheran Tennessee Synod.

== History ==
Prior to 1839, a group of Lutherans of the Evangelical Lutheran Tennessee Synod moved from western North Carolina and eastern Tennessee to southeast Missouri. In 1872, a free conference was held in Gravelton, Missouri, with participants from that group, the LCMS, the Holston Synod, and the Norwegian Synod. The LCMS president, C. F. W. Walther, urged the Tennessee Synod members to organize themselves as a conference of the Tennessee Synod, the English (Evangelical) Lutheran Conference of Missouri.

The conference applied for admission to the LCMS as a district in 1887, but was advised to instead form a separate synod because the LCMS was still a German-language synod while the conference used English. The conference therefore organized as the independent English Evangelical Lutheran Synod of Missouri and Other States in 1888. The English Synod was in full agreement with the LCMS on doctrine, and joined the Evangelical Lutheran Synodical Conference in 1890.

In 1911, with members of the LCMS itself becoming at least bilingually English-speaking, the English Synod merged into the LCMS. However, because it wanted to maintain its identity, it was accepted as a non-geographical district. Despite the transition of the LCMS to English, the English District has continued as a separate district.

The English Synod operated two colleges, both acquired in 1893. In 1908, it gave St. John's College of Winfield, Kansas, to the LCMS. Concordia College of Conover, North Carolina, was transferred to the LCMS at the time of the merger. Both colleges have since closed.

The Lutheran Witness, the main lay-oriented magazine of the LCMS, was originally published, starting in 1882, by the Cleveland District Conference. The English Synod took over publication in 1888, and it became an LCMS publication upon the 1911 merger.

== Current status ==
As of 2024, the district includes 158 congregations and missions in 22 U.S. states and the Canadian province of Ontario, subdivided into 25 circuits, as well as 38 preschools, 17 elementary schools, and 2 high schools. Baptized membership in district congregations is approximately 36,053.

English District offices are located in Farmington, Michigan. Delegates from each congregation meet in convention every three years to elect the district president, vice presidents, circuit counselors, a board of directors, and other officers.

== Bishops/Presidents ==
- Henry Philip Eckhardt, 1911–1912
- M. S. Sommer, 1912–1915
- John Adam Detzer, 1915–1918
- O. C. Kreinheder, 1918–1927
- Guido R. Schuessler, 1927–1936
- Paul Lindemann, 1936–1938
- Martin Walker, 1938–1945
- Herman William Bartels, 1945–1951
- Hugo G. Kleiner, 1951–1963
- Bertwin L. Frey, 1963–1970
- John H. Baumgaertner, 1970–1974
- Harold L. Hecht, 1974–1976
- George W. Bornemann, 1976–1984
- Donald F. Jung, 1984–1986
- Roger D. Pittelko, 1986–1997
- David H. Ritt, 1997–2006
- David P. Stechholz, 2006–2015
- Jamison J. Hardy, 2015–2024
- Jeffrey Miskus, 2024–present

Hecht was one of four district presidents who were removed from office by Synod President J. A. O. Preus on April 2, 1976, for non-compliance with synodical directives on the ordination and placement of improperly endorsed ministerial candidates from Seminex.
