= Lutheran school =

Educational institution operated by a Lutheran organization

A Lutheran school is a school associated with Lutheranism. They were common amongst Lutherans who migrated to the United States and Australia from Germany and Scandinavia.

== Australia ==
The first Lutheran school in Australia opened in 1839. At 2013, there were twenty-seven Lutheran-run primary and secondary schools in Queensland, thirty-three in South Australia and sixteen in Victoria, with a much smaller number in each of the other states and territories. The body overseeing these is Lutheran Education Australia, which has a branch in each State.

There has been significant growth in Australian Lutheran school enrolments over the past twenty-five years, particularly in the decade up to 2011. As of August 2011, 37 313 Australian children attended Lutheran schools, with another 3 600 in early childhood centres. At this time, there were 3 249 teachers employed at Lutheran schools around Australia.

== United States ==
When the Lutheran Church–Missouri Synod (LCMS) was founded in 1847, this tradition of Lutheran education was continued. The synod was started by twelve churches that operated a total of nineteen schools. Several of the churches operated a number of schools in the rural countryside so that students would not have to walk too far to school each day.

For the most part, Lutheran schools are operated by individual congregations. Some schools are operated by groups of congregations, or associations. The schools are autonomous in that they hire their own teachers, select their own curriculum, and set their own fees. In the past most of the costs were paid by the operating congregations. Due to today's economic situation, more and more of the operating funds come from tuition and fees.

The LCMS operates the largest Protestant school system in the United States. As of the 2017-18 school year, the LCMS operates 1,127 Early Childhood Centers, 778 elementary schools, and 87 high schools. The LCMS also operates ten universities and two seminaries. These schools educate more than 180,000 students and are taught by almost 22,000 teachers. Lutheran schools operated by the LCMS also exist in Hong Kong, mainland China, and Vietnam.

The Wisconsin Evangelical Lutheran Synod (WELS) currently operates 393 early childhood education centers (largely preschools), 304 elementary schools, and 29 high schools. The Evangelical Lutheran Church in America (ELCA) operates 1,573 early childhood programs, 296 elementary schools, and 14 high schools as of December 31, 2018.

In 2011, Valparaiso University recorded 140 Lutheran high schools in operation of various denominations.

== Indonesia ==
In Indonesia, Lutheran schools are limited only to the North Sumatra, such as the Batak Christian Protestant Church in located to the Medan, Pematang Siantar, and Balige. The Batak Christian Protestant Church (HKBP) operates its own elementary high school, junior high school, senior high school, and vocational high school, all run owned by the HKBP Foundation.

== See also ==
- Christian school
