= Circuit (LCMS) =

A circuit, in the Lutheran Church–Missouri Synod (LCMS), is a local grouping of congregations within one of the synod's 35 districts. Circuits typically include 8 to 12 congregations. In order to send a pair of delegates to the triennial synodical convention, a circuit must have between seven and twenty congregations with a combined total of between 1,500 and 10,000 confirmed members; however, synod by-laws allow the president of the Synod to make exceptions upon the request of a district's board of directors. In some situations where a circuit includes numerous small congregations spread over a large area, the circuit may be subdivided for visitation purposes but still count as a single circuit for voting purposes.

A circuit visitor is a pastor who helps to oversee the other pastors within a circuit. The position is best understood as a peer advisor, as the LCMS has traditionally been congregational, as opposed to hierarchical, in its extra-congregational structure. Nevertheless, there is a district president (sometimes called a bishop) over the circuit visitors who is ultimately responsible for the pastors and congregations (generally numbering 100–300) in his district. The visitors were previously called circuit counselors, but the 2013 LCMS convention adopted, and the congregations subsequently ratified, an amendment to its constitution changing their title back to what it had originally been.

== See also ==
- Circuit preacher
