= Southeastern District =

Southeastern District may refer to:

- Southeastern District (Church of the Brethren)
- Southeastern District of the Lutheran Church–Missouri Synod
- Southeastern District (VHSL), of the Virginia High School League
