= New York Theological Seminary =

Non-denominational Christian seminary

Coordinates: 40.811178°N 73.963903°W

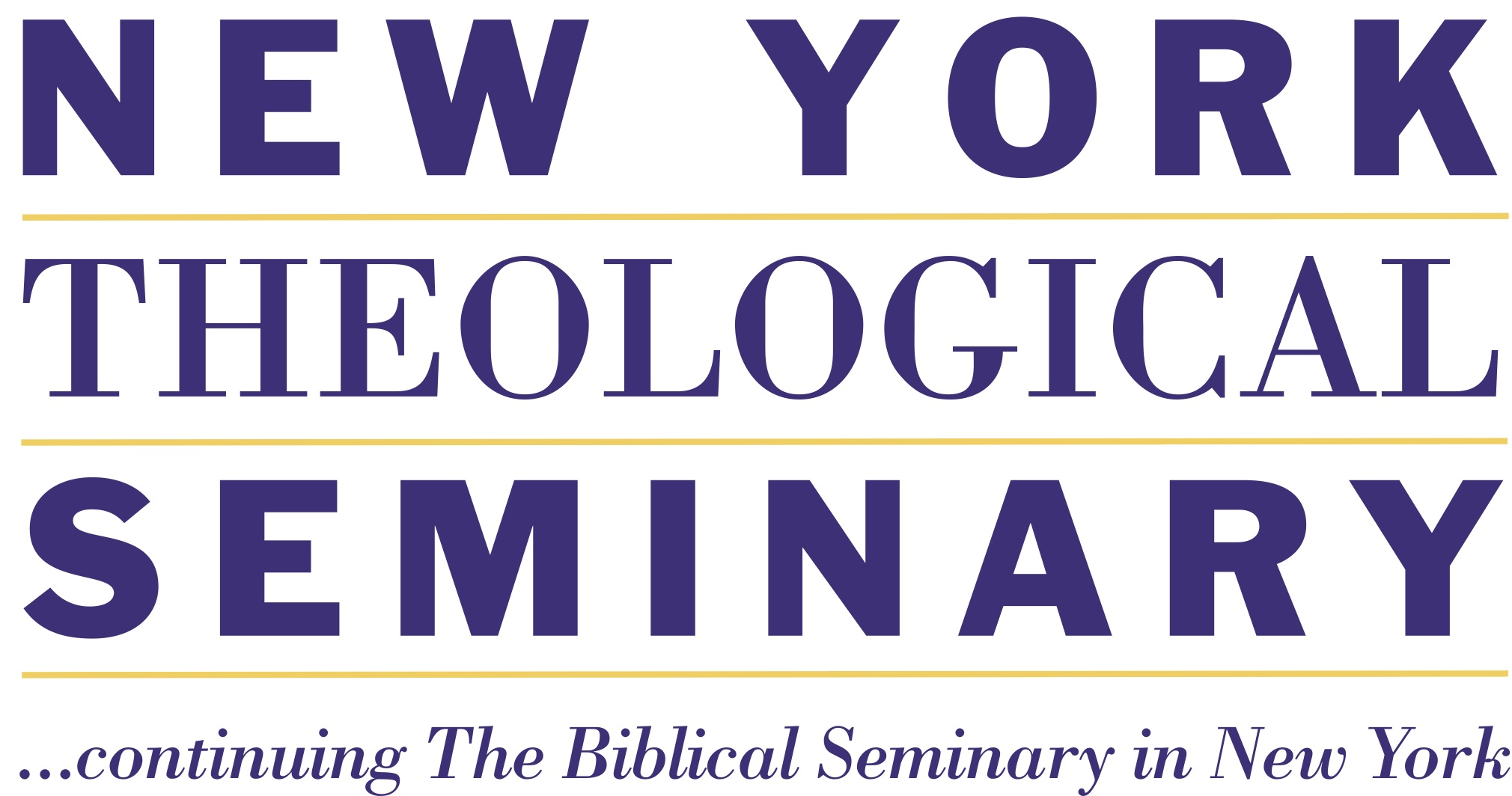
- Former names: Bible Teachers’ College, Bible Teachers’ Training School, The Biblical Seminary in New York
- Type: Private seminary
- Active: 1902–2024
- Founder: Wilbert Webster White
- Religious affiliation: Non-denominational Christian
- Location: New York City, New York, United States
- Website: nyts.edu

The New York Theological Seminary (NYTS) was an American private non-denominational Christian seminary in New York City. It was founded in 1900 as the Bible Teacher's College. It ceased operating as an independent seminary on July 1, 2024.

== History ==
The New York Theological Seminary began its life in 1900 as the Bible Teacher's College in Montclair, New Jersey. Under the direction of its founder, Wilbert Webster White, the school sought to intentionally bridge the divide that had then begun to open between university-based and Bible school forms of theological education. White was a leading proponent of what was known as "the inductive Bible study method", which placed the Bible taught in English in the curriculum's central position. NYTS emphasized practical training for ministry from its inception.

White moved the school to New York City in 1902 in order to provide what he called a more "cosmopolitan" setting and renamed it the Bible Teachers' Training School. In 1921, the name was changed to The Biblical Seminary in New York, and then, in 1965, to New York Theological Seminary.

In the early 1970s, NYTS underwent the first of many financial crises. Under the leadership of theological educator George W. Webber, the school developed programs for students in the greater New York metropolitan area who were already in ministry, were bi-vocational, or were considering a shift from secular to religious vocations. The seminary sold its campus and relocated to more affordable space and began offering its programs at nights or on weekends when urban church leaders who worked full-time could attend. For several years it suspended the granting of the M.Div. degree and focused on offering the STM degree, a newly formed Certificate in Christian Ministry, and continuing education opportunities for urban church leaders. In the mid-1970s, the seminary added the MPS and D.Min. degree programs.

In the early 1980s it began to offer the M.Div. degree again, and began a master's degree program inside Sing Sing Correctional Facility that trains inmates from throughout the New York State prison system for ministry within the system.

In the 1990s, the curriculum was modified to reflect the seminary's commitment to social and community analysis and the increasingly multicultural urban context.

In 2002, the seminary moved to the Morningside Heights area of Manhattan. It had offices at The Interchurch Center and classrooms at Riverside Church. In its final years, it was located at Union Theological Seminary.

In 2019, LaKeesha Walrond was appointed as the first woman and the first African American woman president.

== Academics ==
NYTS was accredited by New York State and the Association of Theological Schools in the United States and Canada. The seminary offered six accredited degrees: Master of Divinity (M.Div.), Master of Arts (MA) in Pastoral Care and Counseling, Master of Arts in Religious Education (MRE), Master of Arts in Religious Leadership and Administration, Master of Arts in Youth Ministry, and Doctor of Ministry (D.Min.). Two non-accredited programs were also offered: a Certificate in Christian Ministry and a Clinical Pastoral Education program that was accredited by the Association for Clinical Pastoral Education through a satellite contract with Norwalk Hospital. It also offered an ATS accredited Master of Professional Studies to selected inmates at Sing Sing Correctional Facility.

== Centers ==
The Ecologies of Learning Project (EOL) was founded in 2004 by a former professor of Urban Studies and Religion, Lowell Livezey (d. 2007), and was funded in part by a grant from the Lilly Endowment. In 2009, it became known as the Center for the Study and Practice of Urban Religion (CSPUR).

== Notable alumni ==
- David Benke, (DMin, 1983) former president of the Atlantic District of the Lutheran Church–Missouri Synod
- Eleanor Moody-Shepherd, dean of students at New York Theological Seminary
- Eugene Peterson, (STB) religious commentator, author, and paraphraser of The Message translation of the Bible
- Sanco Rembert, (MDiv, 1951; STM, 1954) first African-American bishop of the Reformed Episcopal Church
- Pat Robertson, (MDiv, 1959) American religious broadcaster

== See also ==
- List of defunct colleges and universities in New York
