= Concordia University Wisconsin =

Lutheran university in Mequon, Wisconsin, US

- Former names: Concordia College Milwaukee (1881–1982); Concordia College Wisconsin (1982–1989)
- Type: Private university
- Established: 1881; 145 years ago
- Parent institution: Concordia University System
- Affiliations: NAICU; CCCU
- Religious affiliation: Lutheran Church–Missouri Synod
- Endowment: $142.6 million (2025)
- President: Erik P. Ankerberg
- Students: 4,577 (fall 2025)
- Undergraduates: 2,363 (fall 2025)
- Postgraduates: 2,214 (fall 2025)
- Location: Mequon, Wisconsin, U.S. 43°15′13″N 87°54′52″W
- Campus: Lakefront, 200 acres (81 ha)
- Colors: Blue & gold
- Nickname: Falcons
- Sporting affiliations: NCAA Division III; NACC; CCIW; ACHA; NAIA
- Mascot: Freddy the Falcon
- Website: cuw.edu
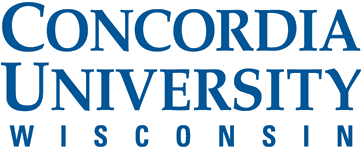

Concordia University Wisconsin (CUW) is a private Lutheran university in Mequon, Wisconsin, United States. It is part of the Concordia University System operated by the Lutheran Church–Missouri Synod (LCMS). The university is organized into six constituent schools in arts and science, business, education, health professions, nursing, and pharmacy. The university had an enrollment of about 5,000 undergraduate and graduate students in 2022. It is accredited by the Higher Learning Commission.

== History ==
In the spring of 1881, the Wisconsin, Illinois, and Minnesota districts of the LCMS decided to open a gymnasium in Milwaukee. The resulting school was opened that September at Trinity Evangelical Lutheran Church in downtown Milwaukee. Classes were taught in the basement of the building, with only 13 students in attendance. A year of instruction was added each year through 1890, making a total of four years. Students had to transfer to Concordia College in Fort Wayne, Indiana, for their fifth and sixth years.

One year after opening, the college, known then as Concordia College, purchased approximately 8 acres (3.2 ha) nearby to erect a permanent facility. The college was located between 31st and 33rd Streets and State Street and Highland Boulevard in Milwaukee until 1983. That campus is now owned and operated by the Forest County Potawatomi Community (the owners of the Potawatomi Hotel & Casino).

In 1887, the three districts transferred ownership to the LCMS itself. The fifth and sixth year of instruction were added in 1890.

For the first 83 years, from its inception to 1964, the college featured a classical education with a pre-theology emphasis. Its main mission was to prepare young men for pastoral careers in the LCMS. Originally, graduates matriculated to Concordia Seminary in St. Louis, Missouri, for an additional four years of divinity studies, leading to ordination within the Lutheran Church.

Prior to the fall of 1964, the combination high school and junior college operated as a male-only institution. Even after women students were accepted in the junior college program for the first time that fall, the high school and the pre-seminary program continued to restrict admissions to men.

=== Growth ===
Under the direction of President Wilbert Rosin, the college requested four-year institution status from the LCMS for its programs, and in 1978 the request was approved. R. John Buuck became president in 1979. In 1982, the former campus of the School Sisters of Notre Dame in Mequon, Wisconsin, was purchased and now has become the permanent home of CUW. In 1996, the original Milwaukee campus was turned over to the Native American Educational System of Wisconsin, which teaches tribal youth about their culture and language as the Indian Community School of Milwaukee.

As construction on the modern campus continued throughout the 1980s, the college petitioned its board of regents for full university status on August 27, 1989, and the request was approved for the fall 1990 term, making it the first among the ten Concordia University System campuses to achieve that standing. During his 17-year tenure, Buuck led the university to unprecedented growth. With the introduction of programs such as business, nursing, adult education, physical therapy, occupational therapy, etc., the university grew rapidly to become the largest Lutheran college and university in North America in 1996.

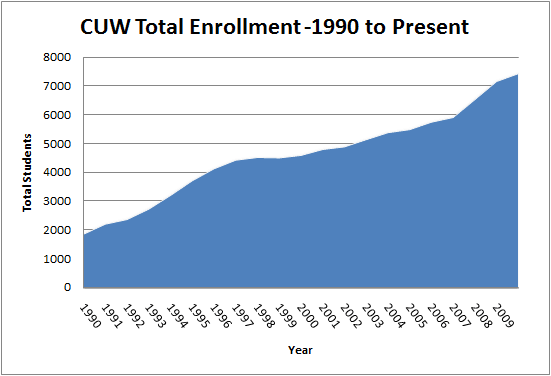
CUW Enrollment 1990 to 2009

CUW doubled in total enrollment from 3,719 in 1995–96 to 7,485 students in 2010–11. Adult education programs were also expanded, thereby topping the list of the largest such programs in higher education for the Lutheran Church. CUW's enrollment makes it the largest Lutheran university in the United States.

Since 2000, CUW has added several new buildings. In the summer of 2011, construction of a School of Pharmacy building was completed. The School of Pharmacy program was launched in the fall of 2010 and is a four-year professional pharmacy program designed to prepare students for a variety of careers within the pharmacy profession. By adding a School of Pharmacy, CUW has become one of three schools in the state of Wisconsin to offer a Pharm.D. degree. The building includes many amenities: clinical practice labs to develop patient care skills, state-of-the-art educational technologies, faculty research space, lecture halls, and faculty offices.

On July 1, 2013, Concordia University Ann Arbor (CUAA) merged with Concordia University Wisconsin. This merger was due to a lack of financial strength and cash flow at the Ann Arbor Campus. CUW became the administration for both campuses, with Ann Arbor considered a satellite campus to the Mequon campus.

Since the two campuses merged, enrollment at the Ann Arbor campus has nearly doubled: in 2012, it enrolled 667 students and in 2022 it enrolled 1,203 students. However, enrollment on the Wisconsin campus has significantly decreased over the same time period: in 2012, it enrolled 7,751 students and in 2022 it enrolled 4,988 students. In early 2024, university president Erik Ankerberg notified employees that the institution would need to cut some staff and sell property and equipment for the university to remain financially viable. The university has had budget shortfalls from 2017 to 2021.

=== Presidents ===
The following people have served as president of CUW:

- Carl Huth (Director), 1881–1882
- Emil Hamann (Temporary President), 1882–1885
- Christoph H. Loeber, 1885–1893
- Max J.F. Albrecht, 1893–1921
- G. Christian Barth, 1921–1934
- Leroy C. Rincker, 1936–1953
- Walter W. Stuenkel, 1953–1976
- Wilbert Rosin, 1977–1979
- R. John Buuck, 1979–1996
- Patrick T. Ferry, 1997–2021
- William R. Cario (Interim President), 2021–2023
- Erik P. Ankerberg, 2023–present

Of those presidents, all were ordained ministers in the LCMS excluding Carl Huth, William Cario, and Erik Ankerberg. Barth, Stuenkel, Rosin, Buuck, Ferry, and Ankerberg held doctorate degrees.

=== Theological concerns and the suspension of Gregory Schulz ===
One of Concordia's tenured professors, Gregory Schulz, published an article criticizing the school for its use of terms such as "diversity", "equity", and "inclusion" in its search for a new president, among multiple other issues on campus which he collectively named "Woke dysphoria". On February 18, 2022, he was indefinitely suspended by Interim President William Cario, banned from campus, and locked out of school accounts for demonstrating "conduct unbecoming a Christian", among other accusations from the school administration.

Letters defending Schulz were sent to the university by the Foundation for Individual Rights in Education and the Academic Freedom Alliance. The suspension gained media coverage in various forms, as well as a petition which amassed nearly 6000 supporters.

Schulz's article, suspension, and subsequent events sparked widespread theological concern about the university (and the entire Concordia University System) among conservative Lutherans. The president of the LCMS, Matthew Harrison, made plans to conduct an in-person visitation on March 23–25, 2022. The university welcomed Harrison's visitation team, who gathered information from administration, faculty, staff, and students.

On May 9, 2022, a letter from Harrison to the Board of Regents called out issues such as breaches of bylaws, encroachment of secularism and Critical Race Theory, and general disregard for ecclesiastical authority. The letter also proposed various reforms for the university's presidential search process as well as for the university at large as a confessional Lutheran institution.

On June 12, 2022, the convention of the South Wisconsin District of the LCMS resolved to limit the power of members of the Board of Regents and to ensure their upholding of synod bylaws. On June 13, the convention further resolved to "identify and eliminate the promotion of social justice, or woke, ideology from the Concordia University System", e.g. "critical race theory, D. I. E. (diversity, inclusion, and equity) initiatives, and other social justice activism".

On January 1, 2024, Schulz published the book Anatomy of an Implosion, which addressed the issue of "Woke Marxism in Lutheran Higher Education", in addition to dealing more specifically with the related matters at Concordia.

== Campus ==
The university is located at 12800 North Lake Shore Drive in Mequon, Wisconsin, a city north of Milwaukee with about 23,000 residents. The university owns a 192-acre (78 ha) campus with over 3.5 miles (5.6 km) of indoor walkways, better known as "tunnels". These "tunnels" connect all academic and residence halls on campus except for the Concordia Center for Environmental Stewardship. The university and its 10 Concordia Centers are home to more than 7,900 undergraduate and graduate, traditional, as well as non-traditional students from 46 states and 34 countries. The university offers 70 undergraduate majors, 22 master's degree programs, and doctoral degrees in pharmacy, physical therapy, educational leadership, business administration and nursing practice. There are also a variety of accelerated evening and e-learning programs.

== Athletics ==
Concordia Falcons wordmark

Concordia Wisconsin teams (nicknamed the Falcons) participate in the National Collegiate Athletic Association's Division III and are members of the Northern Athletics Collegiate Conference (NACC). Men's sports include baseball, basketball, cross country, football, golf, ice hockey, lacrosse, shooting, soccer, tennis, track & field and wrestling; women's sports include acrobatics and tumbling, basketball, cheerleading, cross country, dance, golf, ice hockey, lacrosse, shooting, soccer, softball, tennis, track & field, volleyball, field hockey and wrestling.

In April 2012, CUW opened its new baseball field, Kapco Park. The field is home to both CUW's men's baseball and the Lakeshore Chinooks, a local minor league baseball team part-owned by Robin Yount and Bob Uecker. Kapco Park has the maximum capacity for 3,000 fans in various seating areas throughout the facility including reserved seats, fan decks, general admission and grass seating, all with beautiful views of Lake Michigan. This ballpark has a synthetic turf field, except the pitchers mound, for consistent play throughout the year. It also has a fully functioning press box, dugouts, concession area and restrooms. The park sits on the northeast corner of the campus, located on the shores of Lake Michigan.

In 2013, CUW announced the addition of acrobatics and tumbling, the university's 24th sport with a competitive championship. CUW was expected to begin its first season of competition during the spring of 2015 with an approximate roster of 30 to 40 student-athletes. The official competition season is February–April. The Falcons became the 12th school to sponsor the emerging sport, in association with the National Collegiate Acrobatics & Tumbling Association.

=== Mascot ===
CUW is represented by Freddy the Falcon. The school's athletic colors are royal blue, white, and grey.

== Student life ==
The university has more than 70 student organizations in various fields of interest.

CUW's Student Government Association (SGA) oversees all student organizations on campus. It is made up of resident senators from each dormitory, commuter senators who live off-campus, organization senators who represent campus organizations, and the executive board. SGA receives its funding from the $40 Student Government Program fee that full-time students pay. SGA works with the students, faculty, campus ministry, and the administration to represent the students in all aspects of life at Concordia.

The CUW Campus Activities Board coordinates, markets, and facilitates activities for the entire campus throughout the year. These events include Homecoming, An Evening at the Lounge, Casino Night, Winterfest, and many new and traditional events.

CUW's student policy prohibits same-sex marriage, same-sex sexual contact, and all sex outside of marriage. The LCMS regards homosexuality, homosexual thoughts, and homosexual actions as sinful. A pre-seminary student who came out as gay during his junior year was told by the university that he had no future in the Lutheran church (the LCMS does not ordain homosexual people as ministers).

== Notable people ==
=== Alumni ===
- David Benke, tenth president of the Atlantic District of the Lutheran Church–Missouri Synod
- Bernard Bull, president of Concordia University Nebraska
- André Carson, U.S. Representative, second Muslim elected to Congress
- David Clarke, Sheriff of Milwaukee County
- Theodore Dammann, 23rd Secretary of State for Wisconsin
- Ralph W. Klein, Old Testament scholar and professor at Lutheran School of Theology at Chicago
- Richard Lischer, theologian and professor at Duke Divinity School
- Martin E. Marty, theological scholar and philosopher
- Tim Polasek, College football coach
- John Scardina, professional football player
- Kurt W. Schuller, Wisconsin politician
- Louis J. Sieck, president of Concordia Seminary in St. Louis
- Walter Wangerin Jr., author and educator
- Norman Wengert, political scientist

=== Faculty ===
- Rebecca Ehretsman, eighteenth president of Wartburg College
