= Exodus Transitional Community =

American non-profit organization

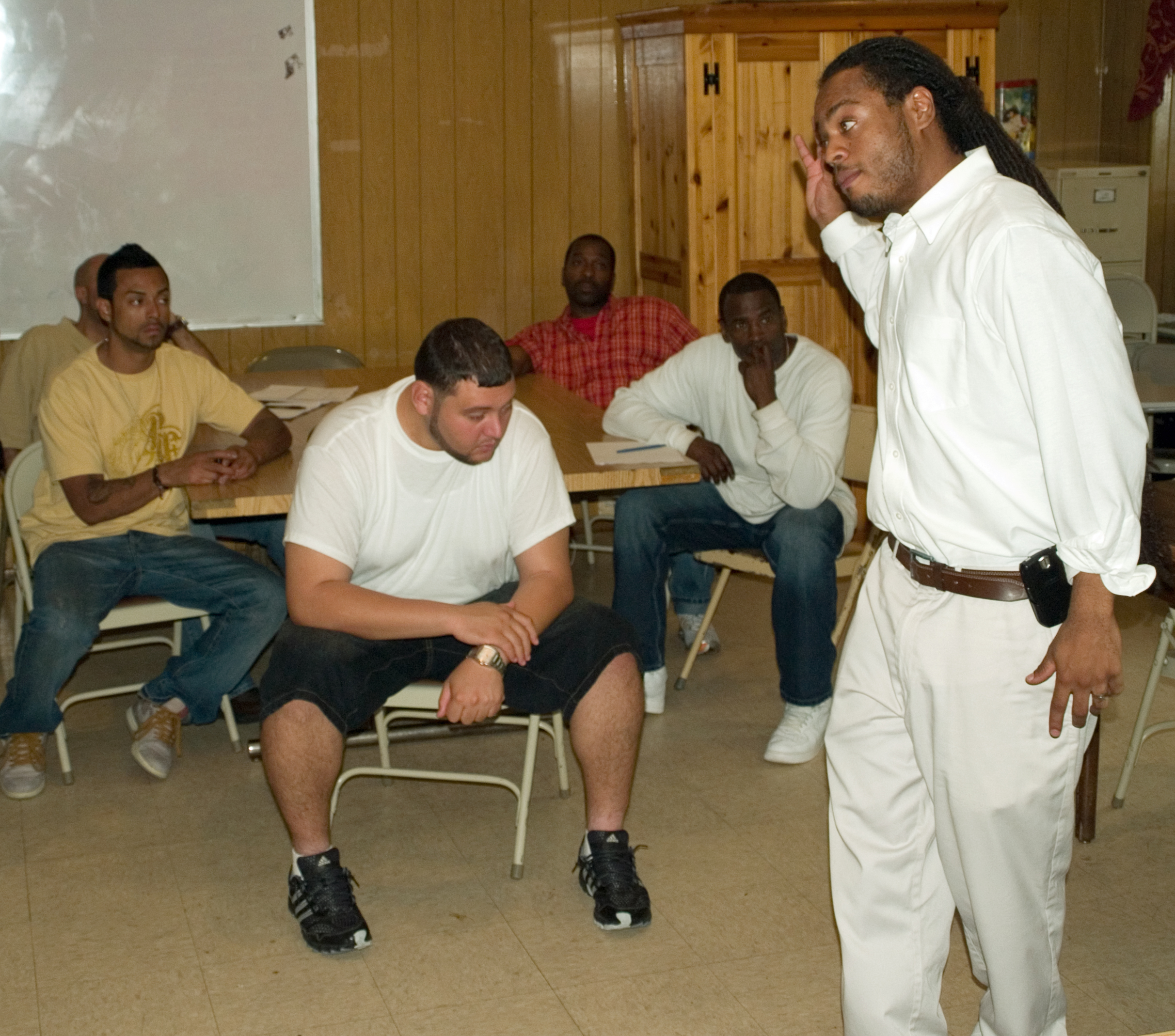
Alvin Willis, an intake counsel, talks to new clients of the program.

The Exodus Transitional Community is a non-profit organization that provides support services to men and women who are in transition from incarceration to full-integration into their communities. It helps these individuals build stable lives by promoting their social and economic well-being so as to break the cycle of recidivism.

== History ==
Exodus Transitional Community, Inc. originated behind prison walls in the 1970s. A group of New York State prisoners that were serving lengthy sentences developed, along with Chaplain Rev. Ed Muller, what they called the "Exodus Group". The Exodus Group offered opportunities for study and discussion based on a model of self-discovery, acceptance of responsibility for past behavior, and dedication to change. The prisoners worked on their self-development and prepared for their eventual release into society. With the assistance of Rev. Bill Webber, then president of the New York Theological Seminary, the Exodus Group's spirit of empowerment led to the development of an accredited master's degree program in Sing Sing Correctional Facility. After many meetings, speaking engagements, and requests for assistance, Exodus Transitional Community, Inc. received its first substantial contribution and officially opened its doors in March 1999.
