= St. John's Lutheran Church (Conover, North Carolina) =

Historic Lutheran congregation in North Carolina, US

Coordinates: 35.7316°N 81.1854°W

Saint John's Lutheran Church
- St. John's Lutheran Church & cemetery

Religion
- Affiliation: Lutheran Church–Missouri Synod
- Province: LCMS Southeastern District
- Leadership: Rev. Scott D. Johnson & Rev. Anton Lagoutine

Location
- Location: Conover, North Carolina, United States
- State: North Carolina
- Interactive map of Saint John's Lutheran Church

St. John's Lutheran Church is a congregation of the Lutheran Church–Missouri Synod located in Conover, North Carolina, and a member of the LCMS' Southeastern District. Officially formed in 1798, the church has a rich German history.

== History ==
The first evidence of a congregation on the current site is 1765, but the official land grant was bestowed upon the congregation in 1798. The founders of the church were largely Pennsylvania Dutch (Germans). The early records of the church have been lost partly as the result of two fires—the first in 1950, the second in 2001. However, in both fires, the church's bell tower, which boasts a distinct blue neon sign in the shape of a cross, has remained intact. The church buildings have, at different times, been used by the Reformed Church in America and various Lutheran synods. The members of St. John's were instrumental in the founding of two Lutheran colleges—the early but now non-existent Concordia College of Conover and Lenoir-Rhyne College (now Lenoir-Rhyne University).

== Building ==
The current sanctuary was dedicated in 2003. It houses a pipe organ constructed by Casavant Frères of Saint-Hyacinthe, Quebec.
