= Kieschnick =

Kieschnick is a surname. Kieschnick is Sorbian (or Wendish) for "cottager." Notable people with this name include:

- Brooks Kieschnick (born 1972), American retired baseball player
- Gerald B. Kieschnick (born 1943), the 12th president of the Lutheran Church–Missouri Synod (LCMS)
- Roger Kieschnick (born 1987), American baseball outfielder
