= Patrick Ferry =

American historian

President of Concordia University Wisconsin
- In office August 1997 – June 2021

Personal details
- Education: St. John's College (B.A.); Concordia Theological Seminary (M.Div.); University of Colorado Boulder (Ph.D.)

Patrick Ferry is an American academic administrator and pastor, serving as the president of Concordia University Wisconsin in Mequon, Wisconsin, from 1997 to 2021. The higher education institution is affiliated with the Lutheran Church–Missouri Synod (LCMS).

== Background ==
Ferry began his career at Concordia University Wisconsin as a professor of history in 1991. Prior to that time, he served as an educator for the University of Wyoming during the 1990–1991 school year, the Lutheran campus pastor for the University of Wyoming in Laramie, Wyoming, from 1989 to 1991, and the assistant pastor at Wheat Ridge Lutheran Church in Wheat Ridge, Colorado, from 1987 to 1989.

In July 2019, Ferry published his first book, a memoir entitled Faith in the Freshman: A Story of Hopes and Hoops that recounts his formative years, including his time as a basketball player at what he described as one of the worst college basketball programs in the country, St. John's College in Winfield, Kansas, the early formation of his Lutheran faith; and his experiences as a father and college president.

In September 2020, Ferry announced his intent to retire from Concordia University Wisconsin in June 2021 after 30 years of service, 24 as president.

== Education ==
Ferry earned his bachelor's degree from St. John's College in Winfield, Kansas, in 1981. He completed his M.Div. from Concordia Theological Seminary in Fort Wayne, Indiana, in 1987. He also earned a Ph.D. in European history from the University of Colorado Boulder in 1996.

Ferry is the board chairman for the Lutheran Educational Conference of North America and a member of the board of the Wisconsin Foundation of Independent Colleges. Ferry also serves as a vice president of the Concordia University System of the LCMS.

== Religious affiliation ==
Ferry is a member of Mount Calvary Lutheran Church in Milwaukee, Wisconsin. He is an ordained pastor of the Lutheran Church–Missouri Synod.
