= Robert Kuhn =

Robert Kuhn may refer to:

- Robert Lawrence Kuhn (born 1944), American author, investment banker, China specialist, television host
- Robert T. Kuhn (born 1937), American clergyman, president of the Lutheran Church - Missouri Synod
