= Lutheran Educational Conference of North America =

The Lutheran Educational Conference of North America (LECNA) is a consortium of Lutheran liberal arts colleges and universities. Formed in 1910, it is the oldest existing inter-Lutheran organization in the United States and Canada. LECNA's purpose is to encourage, assist, and promote cooperation among Lutheran colleges and universities in the United States and Canada.

== Member institutions ==
The conference (or consortium) includes 40 member institutions:

- Augsburg University
- Augustana College (Illinois)
- Augustana University (South Dakota)
- Bethany College (Kansas)
- Capital University
- Carthage College
- California Lutheran University
- Concordia University College of Alberta
- Concordia University Texas
- Concordia College (Minnesota)
- Concordia College, Bronxville
- Concordia College, Selma
- Concordia University, Saint Paul
- Concordia University, Ann Arbor, Michigan
- Concordia University Chicago
- Concordia University (California)
- Concordia University, Nebraska
- Concordia University (Portland, Oregon)
- Concordia University Wisconsin
- Finlandia University
- Gettysburg College
- Gustavus Adolphus College
- Grand View University
- Lenoir-Rhyne College
- Luther College (Iowa)
- Luther College (Saskatchewan)
- Midland University
- Muhlenberg College
- Newberry College
- Pacific Lutheran University
- Roanoke College
- St. Olaf College
- Susquehanna University
- Thiel College
- Trinity Lutheran College (Washington)
- Texas Lutheran University
- Valparaiso University
- Wagner College
- Wartburg College
- Wittenberg University
