= Eugene H. Peterson =

American author and translator (1932–2018)

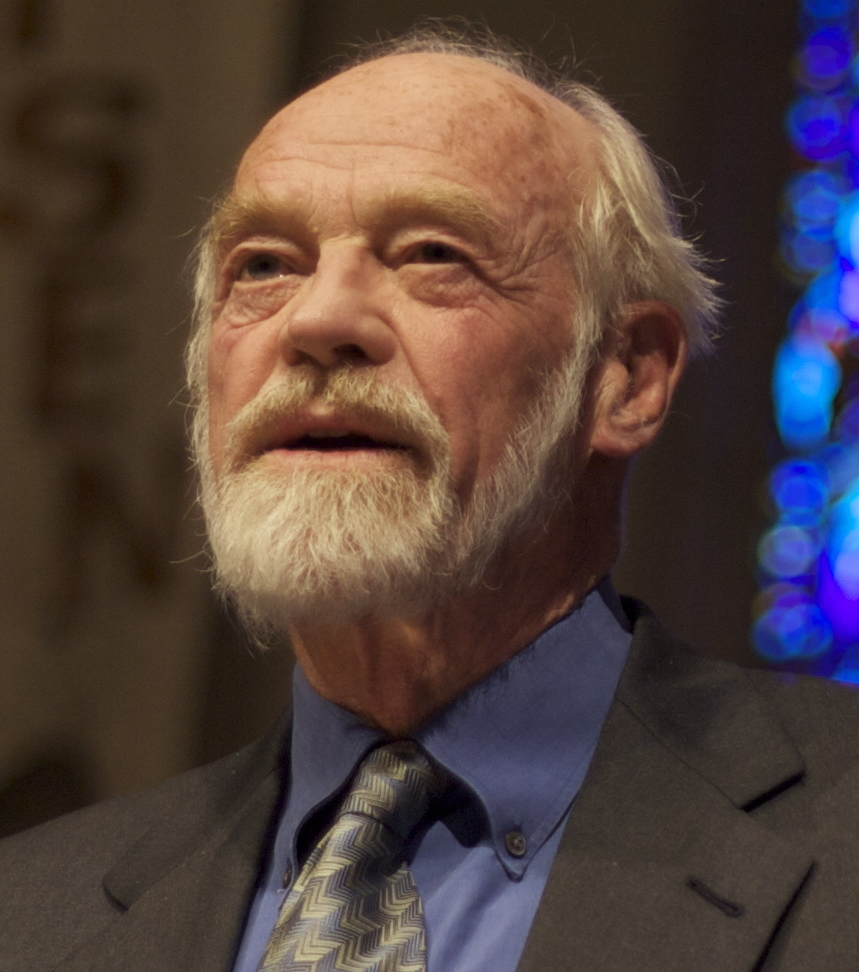
- Peterson speaking in Seattle, 2009
- Born: Eugene Hoiland Peterson; November 6, 1932; Stanwood, Washington, US
- Died: October 22, 2018 (aged 85); Lakeside, Montana, US
- Spouse: Janice Stubbs (m. 1958)
- Children: 3

Ecclesiastical career
- Religion: Christianity
- Church: Presbyterian Church (USA)

Academic background
- Education: Seattle Pacific University (BA); New York Theological Seminary (BST); Johns Hopkins University (MA)
- Influences: W. H. Auden; Karl Barth; Georges Bernanos; Charles Dickens; Fyodor Dostoevsky; George Eliot; William Faulkner; John of the Cross; Marilynne Robinson; Teresa of Ávila; Alexander Whyte

Academic work
- Discipline: Theology
- Institutions: Regent College
- Notable works: The Message (1993–2002)

Eugene Hoiland Peterson (November 6, 1932 – October 22, 2018) was an American Mainline Protestant minister, scholar, Presbyterian theologian, author, and poet. He wrote more than 30 books, including the Gold Medallion Book Award–winner The Message: The Bible in Contemporary Language (NavPress, 2002), an idiomatic paraphrasing commentary and translation of the Bible into modern American English using a dynamic equivalence translation approach.

== Background ==
Peterson was born on November 6, 1932, in East Stanwood, Washington, and grew up in Kalispell, Montana. He earned his Bachelor of Arts degree in philosophy from Seattle Pacific University, his Bachelor of Sacred Theology degree from New York Theological Seminary, and his Master of Arts degree in Semitic languages from Johns Hopkins University. He also held several honorary doctoral degrees.

In 1958, Peterson married Jan Stubbs. They had three children.

== Career ==
In 1962, Peterson was a founding pastor of Christ Our King Presbyterian Church (PCUSA) in Bel Air, Maryland, where he served for 29 years before retiring in 1991. He emphasized the message of Jesus as being communal rather than individual in its nature. He was the James M. Houston Professor of Spiritual Theology at Regent College in Vancouver, British Columbia, from 1992 to 1998.

=== The Message ===
Peterson is probably best known for The Message: The Bible in Contemporary Language. The stated goal of The Message was to make the original meaning more understandable and accessible to the modern reader. Peterson said:

When Paul of Tarsus wrote a letter, the people who received it understood it instantly, When the prophet Isaiah preached a sermon, I can't imagine that people went to the library to figure it out. That was the basic premise under which I worked. I began with the New Testament in the Greek — a rough and jagged language, not so grammatically clean. I just typed out a page the way I thought it would have sounded to the Galatians.

Peterson worked on The Message throughout the 1990s, translating the original Hebrew, Greek, and Aramaic texts and paraphrasing them into contemporary American English slang. The translation was published in 2002 and had sold more than 15 million copies by 2018.

=== Same-sex marriage controversy ===
In 2017, a Religion News Service interviewer asked Peterson about same-sex marriage, which had been endorsed by his denomination, the Presbyterian Church (USA). Peterson spoke positively of gay and lesbian Christians he had come to know in the past twenty years, and he described homosexuality as "not a right thing or wrong thing." Asked if he would be willing to perform a same-sex wedding ceremony, he replied, "Yes." The interview caused an immediate uproar in conservative Christian circles. LifeWay Christian Books announced plans to stop selling Peterson's works. The following day, however, Peterson published a statement affirming "a biblical view of marriage: one man to one woman" and retracting his affirmative answer to the question about officiating at a same-sex wedding. "I regret the confusion and bombast that this interview has fostered. It has never been my intention to participate in the kind of lightless heat that such abstract, hypothetical comments and conversations generate."

Peterson died the following year. In his 2021 authorized biography, A Burning in My Bones, Winn Collier reported that Peterson's retraction statement had actually been written by Peterson's editor and publisher, and released after Peterson reviewed it. Peterson's son, Eric, doubted that the statement accurately reflected his father's convictions.

== Death ==
Peterson had dementia in his later years. He was hospitalized on October 8, 2018, after his health took an abrupt and dramatic turn. "[It] was caused by infection", said his son Eric Peterson in an email. Peterson had retired from public life in 2017 after publishing his final book, As Kingfishers Catch Fire. This was around the same time as the same-sex controversy around him surfaced. Collier, Peterson's biographer, shared the family's poignant memory from the days leading up to Peterson's death: "During [his final] days, it was apparent that he was navigating the thin and sacred space between earth and heaven. We overheard him speaking to people we can only presume were welcoming him into paradise." The family also commented how "[t]here may have even been a time or two when he accessed his Pentecostal roots and spoke in tongues as well." Peterson remained "joyful and smiling" in his final days.

Peterson died at his home in Lakeside, Montana, on October 22, 2018, at the age of 85, a week after entering hospice care for complications related to congestive heart failure.

== Books ==
- Growing Up in Christ: A Guide for Families with Adolescents (John Knox, 1976); then as Growing Up with Your Teenager (F. H. Revell, 1987); and then, with an additional chapter, as Like Dew Your Youth: Growing Up with Your Teenager (Eerdmans, 1994)
- A Year with the Psalms: 365 Meditations and Prayers (Word Books, 1979); revised as Praying with the Psalms: A Year of Daily Prayers and Reflections on the Words of David (HarperCollins, 1994)
- Five Smooth Stones for Pastoral Work (John Knox, 1980); then by (Eerdmans, 1992)
- A Long Obedience in the Same Direction: Discipleship in an Instant Society (InterVarsity, 1980)
- Traveling Light: Reflections on the Free Life (InterVarsity, 1982); then as Traveling Light: Modern Meditations on St. Paul's Letter of Freedom (Helmers & Howard Publishing, 1988)
- Run with the Horses: The Quest for Life at Its Best (InterVarsity, 1983)
- Earth and Altar: The Community of Prayer in a Self-Bound Society (Paulist Press/ InterVarsity, 1985); then as Where Your Treasure Is: Psalms that Summon You from Self to Community (Eerdmans, 1993)
- Forces Concealed in Quiet: Meditations from the Writings of John the Apostle [Gospel of John, 1-3 John, and Revelation] (Thomas Nelson, 1985)
- Working the Angles: The Shape of Pastoral Integrity (Eerdmans, 1987)
- Reversed Thunder: The Revelation of John and the Praying Imagination (Harper & Row, 1988)
- Answering God: The Psalms as Tools for Prayer (Harper & Row, 1989)
- The Contemplative Pastor: Returning to the Art of Spiritual Direction. The Leadership Library, vol. 17 (Christianity Today/Word, 1989); then (Eerdmans, 1993)
- Under the Unpredictable Plant: An Exploration in Vocational Holiness (Eerdmans, 1992)
- Subversive Spirituality (Eerdmans, 1994); then eds. Jim Lyster, John Sharon, Peter Santucci (Eerdmans/Regent College, 1997)
- Take and Read: Spiritual Reading, An Annotated List (Eerdmans, 1996); then published jointly (Eerdmans/Regent College, 2000)
- Living the Message: Daily Reflections with Eugene H. Peterson, ed. Janice Stubbs Peterson (HarperSanFrancisco, 1996)
- Leap Over a Wall: Earthy Spirituality for Everyday Christians (HarperCollins, 1997)
- The Wisdom of Each Other: A Conversation between Spiritual Friends (Zondervan, 1998)
- First and Second Samuel. Westminster Bible Companion, eds. Patrick D. Miller and David L. Bartlett (Westminster John Knox, 1999)
- The Unnecessary Pastor: Rediscovering the Call. Co-authored by Marva J. Dawn, ed. Peter Santucci (Eerdmans/ Regent College, 2000)
- The Message: The Bible in Contemporary Language (NavPress, 2002)
- The Christmas Troll (NavPress, 2004).
- Christ Plays in Ten Thousand Places: A Conversation in Spiritual Theology (Eerdmans, 2005)
- Eat This Book: A Conversation in the Art of Spiritual Reading (Eerdmans, 2006)
- Living the Resurrection: The Risen Christ in an Everyday Life (NavPress, 2006)
- The Jesus Way: A Conversation on the Ways That Jesus Is the Way (Eerdmans, 2007)
- Conversations: The Message with its Translator (NavPress, 2007); as The Message Study Bible: Capturing the Notes and Reflections of Eugene H. Peterson (NavPress, 2012)
- Tell It Slant: A Conversation on the Language of Jesus in His Stories and Prayers (Eerdmans, 2008)
- Practice Resurrection: A Conversation on Growing Up in Christ (Eerdmans, 2010)
- The Pastor: A Memoir (HarperOne, 2011)
- Holy Luck (Eerdmans, 2013)
- As Kingfishers Catch Fire: A Conversation on the Ways of God Formed by the Words of God (WaterBrook, 2017)
- Every Step an Arrival: A 90-Day Devotional for Exploring God's Word (WaterBrook, 2018)
- Letters to a Young Pastor. With Eric Peterson (NavPress, 2020)
- This Hallelujah Banquet: How the End of What We Were Reveals Who We Can Be (WaterBrook, 2021)
- On Living Well: Brief Reflections on Wisdom for Walking in the Way of Jesus (WaterBrook, 2021)
- Lights a Lovely Mile: Collected Sermons of the Church Year (WaterBrook, 2023)

Praying with the Bible series

- Praying with Jesus: A Year of Daily Prayer and Reflection on the Words and Actions of Jesus (Harper San Francisco, 1993) ISBN 0-06-066566-1 ISBN 978-0060665661
- Praying with the Psalms: A Year of Daily Prayer and Reflection on the Words of David (Harper San Francisco, 1993) ISBN 0-06-066567-X ISBN 978-0060665678
- Praying with Moses: A Year of Daily Prayers and Reflections on the Words and Actions of Moses (Harper San Francisco, 1994) ISBN 0-06-066518-1 ISBN 978-0060665180
- Praying with the Early Christians: A Year of Daily Prayers and Reflections on the Words of the Early Christians (Harper San Francisco, 1994) ISBN 0-06-066517-3 ISBN 978-0060665173
- Praying with Paul: A Year of Daily Prayers and Reflections on the Words and Actions of Paul (Harper San Francisco, 1995) ISBN 0-06-066433-9 ISBN 978-0060664336
- Praying with the Prophets: A Year of Daily Prayers and Reflections on the Words and Actions of the Prophets (Harper San Francisco, 1995) ISBN 0-06-066431-2 ISBN 978-0060664312
