= Eastern District of the Lutheran Church – Missouri Synod =

Subdivision of Christian denomination in the U.S.

Eastern District of the LCMS

Location
- Country: United States
- Territory: Western New York, Pennsylvania (except York and Lancaster counties), Garrett County, Maryland
- Headquarters: Williamsville, New York

Statistics
- Congregations: 135
- Schools: 30 preschool; 13 elementary
- Members: 40,000

Information
- Denomination: Lutheran Church – Missouri Synod
- Established: 1854

Current leadership
- President: Rev. John Pingel

Map
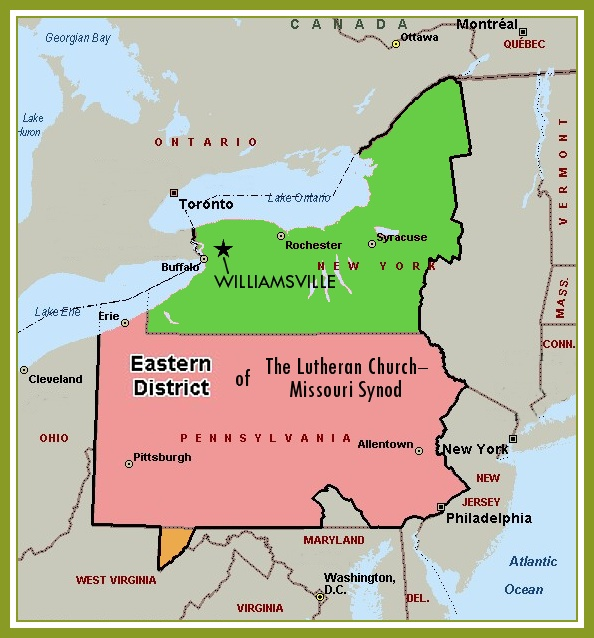

Website
- www.lcmsed.org

The Eastern District is one of the 35 districts of the Lutheran Church – Missouri Synod (LCMS), and covers: most of upstate New York; Pennsylvania, with the exception of York and Lancaster Counties; and Garrett County at the western corner of the Maryland panhandle. The rest of New York, including New York City, is in the Atlantic District; York and Lancaster Counties in Pennsylvania and the remainder of Maryland are in the Southeastern District. In addition, sixteen congregations in the Eastern District's area are in the non-geographic English District, and eleven Pennsylvania congregations are in the SELC District. The Eastern District includes 135 congregations and missions, subdivided into 11 circuits, as well as 28 preschools and 9 elementary schools. Baptized membership in Eastern District congregations is approximately 40,000.

The Eastern District is one of the Synod's four original districts formed in 1854; much of its territory was separated into the Atlantic District in 1906. District offices are located in Williamsville, New York. Delegates from each congregation meet in convention every three years to elect the district president, vice presidents, circuit visitors, a board of directors, and other officers. The Rev. John Pingel became the district president in 2022. The 100th Regular Convention was held June 17–18, 2022 in Tonawanda, New York.

== Presidents ==
Rev. Ernst Gerhard Wilhelm Keyl, the founding president of the Eastern District

- Rev. Ernst G. W. Keyl, 1854–1869
- Rev. P. Carl Gross, 1869–1875
- Rev. J. P. Beyer, 1875–1888
- Rev. Peter Brand, 1888–1899
- Rev. Herman H. Walker, 1899-1915
- Rev. Franz (Francis) C. Verwiebe, 1915–1921
- Rev. William Broeker, 1921–1928
- Rev. J. K. E. Horst, 1928–1931
- Rev. Franz (Francis) C. Verwiebe, 1931–1938
- Rev. Oscar A. Sauer, 1938–1939
- Rev. Paul Fretthold, 1939–1945
- Rev. Charles A. Behnke, 1945–1955
- Rev. Eric C. Malte, 1955–1958
- Rev. Gustav M. Karkau, 1958–1966
- Rev. Herman R. Frincke, 1966–1976
- Rev. Albert W. Bahr, 1976-1978
- Rev. Arnold Kromphardt, 1978–1991
- Rev. Dr. David Belasic, 1991–2000
- Rev. Dr. John G. Brunner, 2000–2009
- Rev. Dr. Chris C. Wicher, 2009–2022
- Rev. John Pingel, 2022–present

Frincke was one of four district presidents who were removed from office by Synod President J. A. O. Preus on April 2, 1976, for non-compliance with synodical directives on the ordination and placement of improperly endorsed ministerial candidates from Seminex. Bahr was appointed in his place.
