= Southern Illinois District of the Lutheran Church – Missouri Synod =

Subdivision of Christian denomination in the U.S.

Southern Illinois District of the LCMS

Location
- Country: United States
- Territory: Southern third of Illinois
- Headquarters: Belleville, Illinois

Statistics
- Congregations: 96
- Schools: 14 preschool; 22 elementary; 3 secondary
- Members: 43,046

Information
- Denomination: Lutheran Church – Missouri Synod
- Established: 1907

Current leadership
- President: Rev. Heath R. Curtis

Map
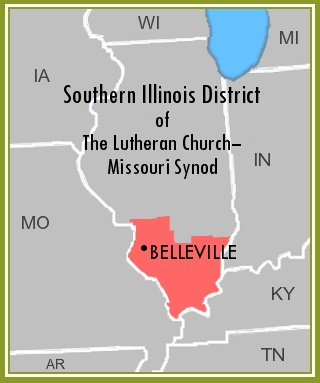

Website
- www.sidlcms.org

The Southern Illinois District is one of the 35 districts of the Lutheran Church – Missouri Synod (LCMS), and covers the southern third of the state of Illinois; the rest of the state is divided between the Northern Illinois District and the Central Illinois District. In addition, one congregation in Granite City is in the non-geographic SELC District. The Southern Illinois District includes 96 congregations and 1 mission start, subdivided into 11 circuits, as well as 14 preschools, 22 elementary schools, and 3 high schools. Baptized membership in district congregations is 43,046. District pastors and lay members are involved in ministry in 27 prisons and jails located in the District. The District also carries out campus ministry at two colleges and supports an elementary school in East St. Louis.

The Southern Illinois District was formed in 1907 when the Illinois District was divided. District offices are located in Belleville, Illinois. Delegates from each congregation meet in convention every three years to elect the district president, vice presidents, circuit counselors, a board of directors, and other officers. The Rev. Timothy J. Scharr became the district president August 29, 2010, upon the election of the Rev. Herbert C. Mueller, Jr. as the First Vice President of the LCMS and was elected to a full three year term in 2012. The current district president is the Rev. Heath R. Curtis, who took office on February 22, 2025.

== Presidents ==
- Rev. Fred William Brockmann, 1907–1909
- Rev. Ulfert Iben, 1909–1912
- Rev. Johannes Gottlieb Frederick Kleinhans, 1912–1933
- Rev. C. Thomas Spitz, Sr., 1933–1945
- Rev. Erhard H. Bohrer, 1945–1946
- Rev. Paul Juergensen, 1946–1947
- Rev. Harry C. Welp, 1947–1957
- Rev. Walter William Adolf Raedeke, 1957–1958
- Rev. W. Theophil Janzow, 1958–1959
- Rev. Alfred Buls, 1959–1967
- Rev. Herman F. Neunaber, 1967–1976
- Rev. Alvin V. Kollmann, 1976–1994
- Rev. Herbert C. Mueller, Jr., 1994–-2010
- Rev. Timothy J. Scharr, 2010–2025
- Rev. Heath R. Curtis, 2025–present

Neunaber was one of several district presidents who were warned of removal from office in 1975 by Synod President J. A. O. Preus for non-compliance with synodical directives on the ordination and placement of improperly endorsed ministerial candidates from Seminex, although Preus opted to only admonish him. Neunaber later became bishop of the Great Rivers Synod of the Association of Evangelical Lutheran Churches (AELC) from 1976 to 1979.
