= The Message (Bible) =

English paraphrase of the Bible

- Full name: The Message: The Bible in Contemporary Language
- Abbreviation: MSG
- NT published: 1993
- Complete Bible published: 2002
- Translation type: Extreme Paraphrase and Dynamic Interpretive
- Revision: 2018
- Publisher: NavPress
- Copyright: THE MESSAGE: The Bible in Contemporary Language copyright © 1993, 2002, 2018 by Eugene H. Peterson. All rights reserved.
- Religious affiliation: Presbyterian
- Website: messagebible.com
- Genesis 1:1–3 First this: God created the Heavens and Earth—all you see, all you don't see. Earth was a soup of nothingness, a bottomless emptiness, an inky blackness. God's Spirit brooded like a bird above the watery abyss. God spoke: "Light!" And light appeared. John 3:16 "This is how much God loved the world: He gave his Son, his one and only Son. And this is why: so that no one need be destroyed; by believing in him, anyone can have a whole and lasting life.

The Message: The Bible in Contemporary Language (MSG) is a paraphrase of the Bible in contemporary English. It was authored by Eugene H. Peterson, and was published in segments from 1993 to 2002. The initial press run for the 2002 publication was 500,000, with 320,000 of those copies sold in advance.

A Catholic version, The Message – Catholic / Ecumenical Edition, was published in 2013.

== Features ==
According to the Introduction to the New Testament of The Message, its "contemporary idiom keeps the language of the Message (Bible) current and fresh and understandable". Peterson notes that in the course of the project, he realized this was exactly what he had been doing in his thirty-five years as a pastor, "always looking for an English way to make the biblical text relevant to the conditions of the people".

== Translation consultants ==
The publisher states: "Peterson's work has been thoroughly reviewed by a team of recognized Old and New Testament scholars to ensure that it is accurate and faithful to the original languages."

Old Testament team:

- Robert L. Hubbard Jr., North Park Theological Seminary (chair)
- Richard E. Averbeck, Trinity Evangelical Divinity School
- Bryan E. Beyer, Columbia International University
- Lamar E. Cooper Sr., Criswell College
- Peter E. Enns, Eastern University
- Duane A. Garrett, The Southern Baptist Theological Seminary
- Donald R. Glenn, Dallas Theological Seminary
- Paul R. House, Beeson Divinity School, Samford University
- V. Philips Long, Regent College
- Tremper Longman, Westmont College
- John N. Oswalt, Asbury Theological Seminary
- Richard L. Pratt Jr., Reformed Theological Seminary, Third Mill Ministries
- John H. Walton, Wheaton College
- Prescott H. Williams Jr., Austin Presbyterian Theological Seminary
- Marvin R. Wilson, Gordon College

New Testament team:

- William W. Klein, Denver Seminary (chair)
- Darrell L. Bock, Dallas Theological Seminary
- Donald A. Hagner, Fuller Theological Seminary
- Moises Silva, Gordon-Conwell Theological Seminary
- Rodney A. Whitacre, Trinity School of Ministry

=== Catholic version ===
Deuterocanonical book translator:

- William Griffin, St. Lawrence Seminary

== Comparison to other translations ==
The Message was translated by Peterson from the original languages. It is a highly idiomatic translation, using contemporary slang from the US rather than a more neutral International English, and it falls on the extreme dynamic end of the dynamic and formal equivalence spectrum. Some scholars, like Michael J. Gorman, consider some of Peterson's idiomatic renderings unconventional. The work was awarded the Evangelical Christian Publishers Association Gold Medallion in 2003 for being the title retailers prized.

=== Psalm 23:1-4 ===
New International Version:

1 The LORD is my shepherd, I lack nothing.
2 He makes me lie down in green pastures,
he leads me beside quiet waters,
3 he refreshes my soul.
He guides me along the right paths
for his name’s sake.
4 Even though I walk
through the darkest valley,
I will fear no evil,
for you are with me;
your rod and your staff,
they comfort me.

King James Version:

1 The Lord is my shepherd; I shall not want.
2 He maketh me to lie down in green pastures: he leadeth me beside the still waters.
3 He restoreth my soul: he leadeth me in the paths of righteousness for his name's sake.
4 Yea, though I walk through the valley of the shadow of death, I will fear no evil: for thou art with me; thy rod and thy staff they comfort me.

The Living Bible:

1 Because the Lord is my Shepherd, I have everything I need!
2-3 He lets me rest in the meadow grass and leads me beside the quiet streams. He gives me new strength. He helps me do what honors him the most.
4 Even when walking through the dark valley of death I will not be afraid, for you are close beside me, guarding, guiding all the way.

The Message:

1–3 GOD, my shepherd!
I don’t need a thing.
You have bedded me down in lush meadows,
you find me quiet pools to drink from.
True to your word,
you let me catch my breath
and send me in the right direction.
4 Even when the way goes through
Death Valley,
I’m not afraid
when you walk at my side.
Your trusty shepherd’s crook
makes me feel secure.

=== Lord's Prayer (Matthew 6:9-13) ===
New International Version:

9 "This, then, is how you should pray:
'Our Father in heaven,
hallowed be your name,
10 your kingdom come,
your will be done,
on earth as it is in heaven.
11 Give us today our daily bread.
12 And forgive us our debts,
as we also have forgiven our debtors.
13 And lead us not into temptation,
but deliver us from the evil one.'"

King James Version:

9 After this manner therefore pray ye: Our Father which art in heaven, Hallowed be thy name.
10 Thy kingdom come, Thy will be done in earth, as it is in heaven.
11 Give us this day our daily bread.
12 And forgive us our debts, as we forgive our debtors.
13 And lead us not into temptation, but deliver us from evil: For thine is the kingdom, and the power, and the glory, for ever. Amen.

The Living Bible:

9 "Pray along these lines: 'Our Father in heaven, we honor your holy name.
10 We ask that your kingdom will come now. May your will be done here on earth, just as it is in heaven.
11 Give us our food again today, as usual,
12 and forgive us our sins, just as we have forgiven those who have sinned against us.
13 Don't bring us into temptation, but deliver us from the Evil One. Amen.'

The Message:

7–13
[...]
Our Father in heaven,
Reveal who you are.
Set the world right;
Do what's best—
as above, so below.
Keep us alive with three square meals.
Keep us forgiven with you and forgiving others.
Keep us safe from ourselves and the Devil.
You're in charge!
You can do anything you want!
You're ablaze in beauty!
Yes. Yes. Yes.

== Editions ==
Old Testament:

- The Pentateuch: ISBN 1-57683-196-5
- The Books of History: ISBN 1-57683-194-9
- The Wisdom Books: ISBN 1-57683-126-4
- The Prophets: ISBN 1-57683-195-7

New Testament:

- Youth Edition: ISBN 0-89109-793-7
- Text Edition: ISBN 0-89109-728-7

Entire Bible:

- With verse markings (The Message Remix): ISBN 1-57683-434-4
- Without verse markings: ISBN 1-57683-289-9
- With verse markings (The Message: The Numbered Edition): ISBN 1-57683-673-8; this edition was recognized as an ECPA Christian Book Award winner.
- Catholic/Ecumenical Edition: 2013, ISBN 978-0879464943

== Criticisms ==
The Message has faced criticism regarding its faithfulness to original Hebrew and Greek Bible manuscripts and its perceived incorporation of terminology and themes associated with the New Age movement.

=== New Age undertones ===
Critics argue that The Message exhibits New Age undertones, drawing parallels to concepts influenced by Hermeticism and other metaphysical philosophies propagated by figures like Helena Blavatsky and the early Theosophical Society, which significantly shaped New Age spirituality.

One notable point of contention is Peterson's inclusion of the Hermetic phrase "As above, so below" within the Lord's Prayer in Matthew 6:9–13. Warren Smith, a former New Age follower, highlights that this phrase, widely used in New Age circles with metaphysical connotations, replaces the traditional "heaven and earth" in The Message.

Furthermore, The Message consistently translates the Greek word Kyrios as "Master Jesus" instead of "Lord Jesus" throughout the New Testament. In Theosophical and New Age thought, "Master Jesus" is frequently understood as one of many "ascended masters"—enlightened beings believed to offer guidance to humanity.

The phrase "the One" is also used approximately one hundred times in The Message to refer to Jesus and God. In various New Age belief systems, "the One" commonly denotes a pantheistic concept of God, where divinity permeates all things, implying a single interconnected unity.

Several passages in The Message have been identified as potentially reflecting a New Age pantheistic view of God. For instance, its rendering of Ephesians 4:6 states:

Ephesians 4:6 (emphasis added)
Literal translation	The Message Bible
one God and Father of all who is over all and through all and in all	one God and Father of all, who rules over all, works through all, and is present in all. Everything you are and think and do is permeated with Oneness.

While traditional Christian interpretations of Ephesians 4:6 typically refer to God's presence in Christian believers through the Holy Spirit, The Message's addition of "Everything you are and think and do is permeated with Oneness" is seen by Smith (2019) as aligning with a pantheistic understanding of God's presence in all things. "Oneness" itself is a term frequently used in New Age contexts to describe a pantheistic view of God.

=== Inaccuracies ===
Critics also point to instances where The Message significantly deviates from original biblical texts, leading to what they consider inaccuracies.

An example is its interpretation of Galatians 5:22–23:

Galatians 5:22-23 (emphasis added)
Literal translation	The Message Bible
But the fruit of the Spirit is love, joy, peace, patience, kindness, goodness, faithfulness.	We develop willingness to stick with things, a sense of compassion in the heart, and a conviction that a basic holiness permeates things and people.

The Message's addition of "a conviction that a basic holiness permeates things and people" is argued to contradict the biblical perspective on human sinfulness.

Another example is Romans 15:13, where The Message uses phrases like "the God of green hope" and "life-giving energy":

Romans 15:13 (emphasis added)
Literal translation	The Message Bible
And may the God of hope fill you with all joy and peace in believing, so that by the power of the Holy Spirit you may abound in hope.	Oh! May the God of green hope fill you up with joy, fill you up with peace, so that your believing lives, filled with the life-giving energy of the Holy Spirit, will brim over with hope!

These phrases have been suggested to reflect New Age beliefs in nature deities, such as Gaia, often associated with the color green and believed to provide 'life-giving energy.'

== Reactions to criticisms ==
The Christian evangelical organization Reachout Trust advises against the use of The Message for "all Bible-believing Christians and anyone exploring or studying Christianity." Conversely, theologian Mike Frost suggests that while The Message is not an accurate translation, its contemporary style can serve as a useful gateway to more serious Bible study.
