= David Benke =

American pastor

David H. Benke
- Born: May 5, 1946 (age 80); Milwaukee, Wisconsin
- Occupations: Pastor; Atlantic District President
- Spouse: Judith (Platt) Benke (m. 1968)
- Parent(s): Raymond and Dorothy Benke
- Relatives: Robert Benke (1953-present), Mike Benke (1947-present), Richard Benke (1953-1953), Carrol (Benke) Shinegold

David Benke is a Lutheran pastor and the former president of the Atlantic District of the Lutheran Church–Missouri Synod, or LCMS. After the 9/11 attacks, Benke participated in an interfaith event. For doing so, he was accused by some of violating LCMS teachings and was suspended in 2002. The suspension was met with equal controversy, and in 2003, the President of The LCMS reinstated him and the charges were withdrawn.

== Education and career ==
Benke was born on May 5, 1946, in Milwaukee, Wisconsin, as the first child of Raymond and Dorothea Benke. He attended Lutheran schools in Milwaukee and earned an Associate of Arts degree from Concordia College, Milwaukee (now Concordia University Wisconsin) in 1966. He earned a Bachelor of Arts degree with honors from Concordia Senior College in Fort Wayne, Indiana. On August 17, 1968, he married Judith Platt, a teacher who graduated from the University of Wisconsin–Madison. Benke earned his Masters of Divinity degree from Concordia Seminary and was ordained a pastor at his boyhood church in Milwaukee on June 15, 1972. His career as an ordained pastor included time as an assistant pastor at Zion Lutheran Church in St. Louis and a religion teacher at Martin Luther High School in New York City. He became pastor of St. Peter's Lutheran Church in Brooklyn, and he served as pastor there from 1975 to 1991 and from 1998–present. While at St. Peter's, Benke earned his Doctor of Ministry degree from the New York Theological Seminary in May 1983.

Benke was elected president of the Atlantic District of the Lutheran Church–Missouri Synod in 1991 and has been re-elected seven times, most recently in 2012.

== Events following September 11 attacks ==
Following the attacks of September 11, 2001, he participated in an interfaith event honoring the victims of 9/11. The event took place at Yankee Stadium and included high-profile speakers of many different religious denominations. His participation in this event was met with opposition by some Missouri Synod Lutherans, who claimed that his participation constituted syncretism and unionism. One such individual was Dr. Wallace Schulz, who was at that time the host of The Lutheran Hour and Second Vice President of the Synod. For several months following the Yankee Stadium event, Schulz tried to negotiate with Benke for a public apology. Schulz conducted an investigation into the allegations and found that Benke had violated synodical teachings in several areas. As Benke offered no apology publicly or privately, on July 6, 2002, Schulz suspended him. However, on April 10, 2003, the President of the Synod, Gerald B. Kieschnick, reinstated Benke. The charges against Benke were eventually withdrawn because an investigation determined he had received permission to attend the Yankee Stadium event from Kieschnick, his ecclesiastical supervisor.
