= Eleanor Moody-Shepherd =

American researcher and teacher

Eleanor Moody-Shepherd is a researcher and teacher in areas of domestic violence, women leadership and women in the bible. She was the dean of students at New York Theological Seminary and a professor of Women Studies at the seminary.

She is an ordained Minister with the Presbyterian Church, USA.

== Career ==
Eleanor Moody-Shepherd was the dean of students for the New York Theological Seminary. The New York Theological Seminary Women's Center was renamed Eleanor Moody-Shepherd Women's Resource Center to honor Shepherd. and the launching of the Birthing Center Think Tank for Women. A free one Day forum was held entitled 'Thinking Outside of the Womb that included the voices of students, family friends, faculty, churches and partnering institutions as they birthed the women's Birthing Think Center Think Tank for Women, so-as to empower women in strengthening relationships between women, men, and children in their communities. The Resource Center for Women was founded in 1986.

The Eleanor Moody-Shepherd Resource Center for Women in Ministry was founded in 1986. It provides fellowship events, learning experiences and programs. It is an organizing forum for women of diverse ethnic backgrounds. The Red Tent Project was launched by the Eleanor Moody-Shepherd Resource Center for Women in Ministry.

She is an organizer for international travel study seminars to the Holy Land, Africa, and other parts of the world. She co-organizes trips to the southern part of the United States of America for the study of history, the Civil Rights Movement, and southern religious teaches. Moody-Shepherd is an educational consultant, preacher, and motivational speaker. She is an author, and a co-author of "Bringing the City to Light: Pastoral Formation in a Multicultural Urban Context," with Martha Jacobs and Rebeca Radillo. It is published in the book Equipping the Saints: Best Practices in Contextual Education.

== Publications ==
=== Chapters ===
- Moody-Shepherd, Eleanor; Heltzel, Peter Goodwin (2008). "Empire, Race, and the Evangelical Multitude: Jesse Jackson, Jim Wallis, and Evangelical Coalitions for Justice". In Benson, Bruce Ellis; Heltzel, Peter Goodwin (eds.). Evangelicals and Empire: Christian Alternatives to the Political Status Quo. Brazos Press.
- Moody-Shepherd, Eleanor. "Our Voices Loud and Clear". In Hunt, Mary E.; Neu, Diann L. (eds.). Christianity: Many Voices, Many Views.
