= George W. Webber (minister) =

American Protestant minister

George William Webber
- Title: Reverend

Personal life
- Born: May 2, 1920 Des Moines, Iowa, U.S.
- Died: July 10, 2010 (aged 90) Maplewood, New Jersey, U.S.
- Notable work(s): God's Colony in Man's World; Congregation in Mission; Today's Church

Religious life
- Religion: Protestant
- Sect: United Church of Christ

George William Webber (May 2, 1920 – July 10, 2010) was an American Protestant minister, and social activist who served as president of the New York Theological Seminary from 1969 to 1983. In 1948, Webber opened a string of storefront churches starting with a church in East Harlem and developed a program to teach theology to inmates at Sing Sing.

== Early life and education ==
Webber was born on May 2, 1920, in Des Moines, Iowa, where he attended Theodore Roosevelt High School. He earned his undergraduate degree from Harvard University, attending on a basketball scholarship, and enlisted in the United States Navy in 1942. He had originally planned to become a lawyer, but decided to become a minister after thinking during time on his own during long watches as a gunnery officer aboard the USS Breeman (DE-104). After completing his military service he graduated with a Bachelor of Divinity degree from Union Theological Seminary and was awarded a Ph.D. at Columbia University in philosophy of religion. He was ordained as a minister by the United Church of Christ.

== Career ==
In 1948, together with two graduates of Union Theological Seminary he established the East Harlem Protestant Parish, with the goal of leading social change at the local level and serving the needy. This first church led to the formation of additional storefront churches. While many Protestants were moving to the suburbs, Webber moved his family to a housing project in Harlem. Webber was named as President of the New York Theological Seminary in March 1969, an appointment that his predecessor John Sutherland Bonnell opposed, citing concerns that Webber's plan for "radical experimentation" at the school would lead to placing too much focus on social action rather than on evangelism. During his tenure as president of the seminary from 1969 to 1983, Webber doubled the size of the school's enrollment, reaching out to expand attendance by African American, Hispanic and female students. He was awarded an honorary degree from Yale University in 1981, which recognized him as a "prophet for the cause of justice".

In 1974, United States Ambassador to South Vietnam Graham Martin wrote a lengthy letter to Webber, asking him to use his "great influence" with the Viet Cong to convince them to suspend further attacks on civilian targets. Martin publicly blamed Webber as "implicitly responsible" for a mortar attack that resulted in the deaths of 32 South Vietnamese children.

== Later life ==
Webber created a theological training program at Sing Sing prison in Ossining, New York, which had awarded Master of Theology degrees to 350 inmates by the time of Webber's death in 2010. Many of the graduates went on to lead churches and other social service careers, with very few returning to prison. Graduates of the prison program have worked as chaplain's assistants and as counselors, with several pursuing ordination after their release. In a 1993 article in The New York Times, Ari L. Goldman called the program the only one of its kind in the United States.

=== Death ===
Webber died at age 90 on July 10, 2010, at his home in Maplewood, New Jersey as a result of complications of Alzheimer's disease. He was survived by his wife, the former Helen Barton, as well as by two daughters, three sons, 11 grandchildren and three great-grandchildren.

== Books published ==
He was the author of three books about his ministry:

- Webber, George W (July 2009). God's Colony in Man's World: Christian Love in Action (2009 ed.). Kessinger Publishing, LLC. ISBN 978-1-104-84077-8.- Total pages: 158
- Webber, George W (1979). Today's church: a community of exiles and pilgrims (1979 ed.). Abingdon. ISBN 978-0-687-42320-0.- Total pages: 160
- Webber, George W (2001). The congregation in mission: emerging structures for the church in an urban society (1964 ed.). Abingdon Press. ISBN 978-2-280-03453-1.- Total pages: 208
- Webber, George W (1990). Led by the Spirit: the story of New York Theological Seminary (1990 ed.). Pilgrim Press. ISBN 978-0-8298-0850-6.- Total pages: 208
