= John Scardina =

American football player (born 1958)

No. 78
- Position: Tackle

Personal information
- Born: July 26, 1958 (age 68); Milwaukee, Wisconsin
- Listed height: 6 ft 4 in (1.93 m)
- Listed weight: 265 lb (120 kg)

Career information
- College: Concordia (WI), Lincoln (MO)
- NFL draft: 1980: undrafted

Career history
- Racine Raiders (1980-1986); Minnesota Vikings (1987)
- Stats at Pro Football Reference

John Scardina is an American former professional football player. He played in the National Football League for the Minnesota Vikings in 1987 as a tackle. He played at the collegiate level at Concordia University Wisconsin and Lincoln University.

== Biography ==
Scardina was born on July 26, 1958, in Milwaukee, Wisconsin. He was inducted into the Minor League Football Hall of Fame in 2000.
