= Central Illinois District of the Lutheran Church – Missouri Synod =

Subdivision of Christian denomination in the U.S.

Central Illinois District of the LCMS

Location
- Country: United States
- Territory: Central Illinois
- Headquarters: Springfield, Illinois

Statistics
- Congregations: 149
- Schools: 43 preschool; 23 elementary; 5 secondary
- Members: 50,200

Information
- Denomination: Lutheran Church – Missouri Synod
- Established: 1907

Current leadership
- President: Rev. Mark Eddy

Map
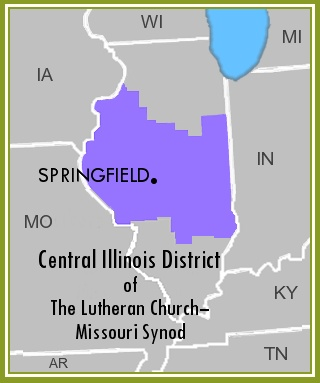

Website
- www.cidlcms.org

The Central Illinois District is one of the 35 districts of the Lutheran Church – Missouri Synod (LCMS), and covers the middle third of the state of Illinois; the rest of the state is divided between the Northern Illinois District and the Southern Illinois District. As of January 2026, the district includes approximately 149 congregations and missions, subdivided into 16 circuits, as well as 43 preschools, 23 elementary schools, and 5 high schools. Baptized membership in district congregations is over 50,000.

The Central Illinois District was formed in 1907 when the former Illinois District was divided into the Northern Illinois District, the Southern Illinois District, and it. District offices are located in the state capital, Springfield, Illinois. Delegates from each congregation meet in convention every three years to elect the district president, vice presidents, circuit counselors, a board of directors, and other officers.

In January 2026, District President Michael W. Mohr was arrested and federally charged with producing child pornography. Mohr was suspended by LCMS president Matthew Harrison, and was replaced by district vice president Michael Burdick as acting president of the district. Mohr subsequently resigned from the LCMS clergy roster. Burdick stepped down as acting president in February 2026, and the district board of directors named the Rev. Mark Eddy as his successor.

== Presidents ==
- Rev. Frederick Brand, 1907–1917
- Rev. Fred William Brockmann, 1917–1918
- Rev. August Friedrich Wilhelm Heyne, 1918–1927
- Rev. P. Schulz, 1927–1932
- Rev. Philip Wilhelm, 1932–1933
- Rev. Walter Ernest Hohenstein, 1933–1935
- Rev. John Carl Schuelke, 1935–1942
- Rev. Albert Otto Carl Bernthal, 1942–1948
- Rev. Emil Frederick Tonn, 1948–1954
- Rev. Alvin W. Mueller, 1954–1963
- Rev. Lewis C. Niemoeller, 1963–1970
- Rev. Rudolph A. Haak, 1970–1974
- Rev. Arthur T. Kuehnert, 1974–1985
- Rev. Robert T. Kuhn, 1985–1995
- Rev. David J. Bueltmann, 1995–2012
- Rev. Mark A. Miller, 2012–2022
- Rev. Michael Mohr, 2022–2026
- Rev. Michael Burdick, 2026 (acting)
- Rev. Mark Eddy, 2026–present
