= Gerald B. Kieschnick =

Lutheran pastor, President of the LCMS (born 1943)

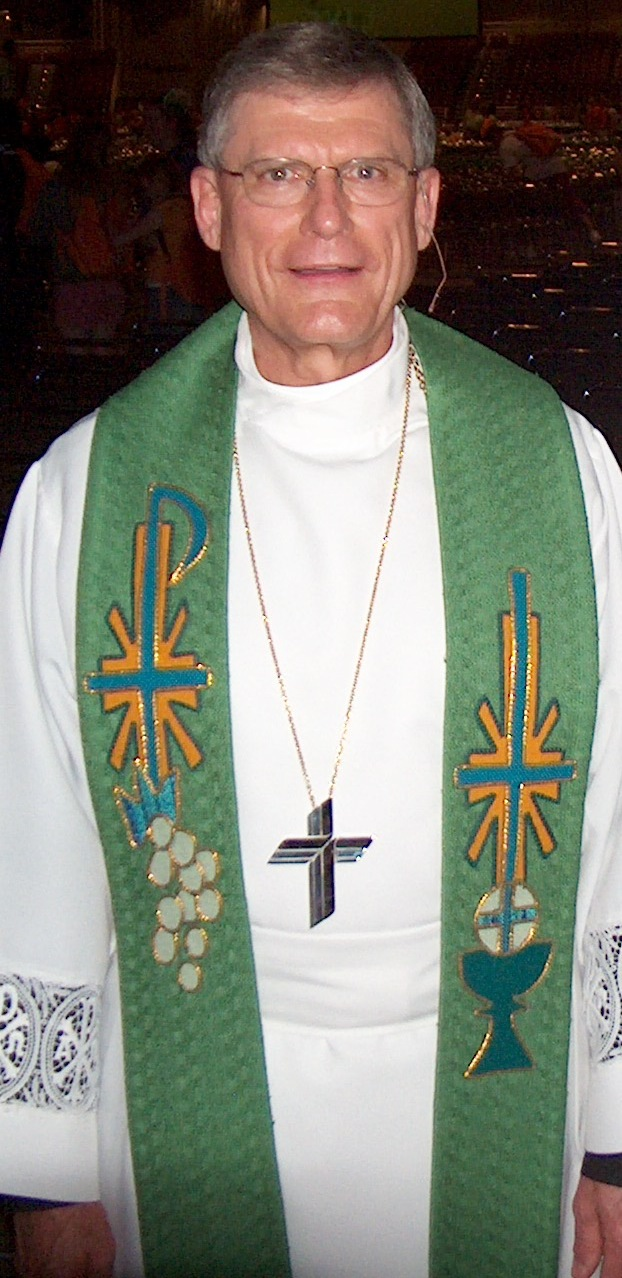
- Kieschnick at the 2004 LCMS National Youth Gathering in Orlando, Florida
- Born: January 29, 1943 (age 83); Houston, Texas
- Education: Texas A&M University (1964); Concordia Theological Seminary, Springfield (1970); Concordia Theological Seminary, Fort Wayne (1977)
- Spouse: Terry Lee Kieschnick ('nee Roos)
- Children: Two
- Church: Lutheran Church–Missouri Synod
- Ordained: 1970
- Congregations served: Good Shepherd Lutheran Church, Biloxi, Mississippi; Redeemer Lutheran Church, Beaumont, Texas; Faith Lutheran Church, Georgetown, Texas

Gerald Bryan Kieschnick (born January 29, 1943, in Houston, Texas) was the 12th president of The Lutheran Church – Missouri Synod (LCMS), being elected to three terms, in 2001, 2004, and 2007. He was defeated in his bid for a fourth term by Matthew C. Harrison on July 13, 2010, at the 64th Regular Convention of the LCMS, and his presidency ended on August 31, 2010. He later became the chief executive officer of Legacy Deo (formerly known as the Lutheran Foundation of Texas) until his retirement in 2025.

Kieschnick and his wife, Terry, have two grown children and two grandchildren, all of whom live in Texas.

== Early career ==
Kieschnick attended Texas A&M University, graduating with a bachelor of science in 1964. He is a 1970 graduate of Concordia Theological Seminary (CTS) in Springfield, Illinois (now located in Fort Wayne, Indiana), obtained his Master of Divinity in 1977 from CTS in Fort Wayne, and received an honorary doctor of laws degree in 1996 from Concordia University in Austin, Texas.

After his ordination in 1970, Kieschnick served as pastor at Good Shepherd Lutheran Church in Biloxi, Mississippi, until 1973; at Redeemer Lutheran Church in Beaumont, Texas, from 1973 to 1981; and at Faith Lutheran Church in Georgetown, Texas, from 1981 to 1986.

He served the Texas District of the LCMS as a circuit counselor from 1978 to 1981 and as director of public relations from 1977 to 1986. Kieschnick was director of development at Lutheran Foundation of Texas from 1986 to 1988 and then served as its executive director from 1988 to 1991.

In 1991, Kieschnick was elected president of the LCMS's Texas District and served in that position until 2001. In addition, from 1998 until his election as LCMS president, Kieschnick chaired the LCMS Commission on Theology and Church Relations and served on the program committee of the LCMS Council of Presidents.

== LCMS presidential election and first term ==
At the LCMS' 2001 convention in St. Louis, Kieschnick was elected to his first three-year term as president of the 2.6-million-member church. He won by 18 votes out of 1,182 total votes cast in the fourth round of balloting over Dean O. Wenthe, then president of Concordia Theological Seminary, Fort Wayne, Indiana. Three other candidates had dropped off in the first three ballots. One of those candidates, Daniel Preus, subsequently was elected to be the church body's first vice president.

Kieschnick's first presidential term was almost immediately beset by controversy (see "Interfaith issues," below). He faced opposition within the church hierarchy, including from four of the synod's five vice-presidents and a majority of the board of directors. Polarization in the LCMS dated back at least to the Seminex controversy in the early 1970s that centered on the faculty of Concordia Seminary, St. Louis. But by the 1990s, members of the LCMS' more conservative wing (who often dub themselves "confessional Lutherans") and its more mission-oriented wing had both established internal caucuses, organizations, and news services to promote their viewpoints and to campaign for synod leadership candidates.

=== Interfaith issues ===
Kieschnick spent much of his first term under fire for his support of Atlantic District president David Benke. On September 23, 2001, Benke took part in an interfaith prayer event at Yankee Stadium sponsored by the city of New York to commemorate the victims of the September 11, 2001, attacks on the World Trade Center. Daniel Preus and others argued that Benke, by participating alongside non-Lutheran clergy and leaders of non-Christian faiths, had engaged in practices that the synod condemns as "unionism" and "syncretism", respectively.

Kieschnick and his supporters replied that the event was not a worship service, as Preus maintained, but a civic event, and that Benke had given Christian witness in a permissible manner. In the synod's official newspaper, Reporter, which reported on the controversy, Kieschnick said that his support for Benke's participation was based on a document titled "The Lutheran Understanding of Church Fellowship". That document had been prepared by a predecessor LCMS president (Alvin L. Barry) and the synod's Commission on Theology and Church Relations, chaired by Kieschnick, and then commended for use and guidance by the synod's 2001 convention. In a section under "civic events", the document states that "offering prayers, speaking, and reading Scripture at events sponsored by governments, schools and volunteer organizations would be a problem if the organization in charge restricted a Christian witness.... Without such a restriction, a Lutheran pastor may for valid and good reason participate in civic affairs such as an inauguration, a graduation, or a right-to-life activity. These occasions may provide opportunity to witness to the Gospel. Pastors may have honest differences of opinion about whether or to what extent it is appropriate or helpful to participate in these or similar civic events. In these cases, charity must prevail." The document continues, "There are also 'once in a lifetime' situations. It is virtually impossible to anticipate all such situations or to establish rules in advance. Specific answers cannot be given to cover every type of situation pastors and congregations face. These situations can be evaluated only on a case-by-case basis and may evoke different responses from different pastors who may be equally committed to LCMS fellowship principles. The LCMS has always recognized this."

Two LCMS ministers sought to bring charges against Kieschnick that, if upheld, would have led to his removal from the clergy roster of the synod. The matter ended with the charges against Kieschnick being voided by a ruling of the synod's Commission on Constitutional Matters and Benke being cleared of charges that also had been brought against him. For several years, the Benke controversy left some LCMS members speaking of a "crisis in the Synod" and warning openly of the possibilities for a schism.

=== Worldwide mission effort ===
During Kieschnick's first term in office, the synod's board of directors approved a proposal from the Board for Mission Services for a 15-year initiative to reach 100 million non-Christians worldwide with the Gospel of Jesus Christ. Mark Weinrich, senior director for LCMS World Mission Support, said that the plan, subsequently titled "Ablaze!", was consistent with a mission emphasis for the synod that Kieschnick had promoted. "President Kieschnick set the vision in his acceptance speech because he talked about shaking the earth with the Gospel," Weinrich said.

The 2004 synod convention took note of the Ablaze! initiative by adopting a number of mission-oriented resolutions. Among those was Resolution 1-04 to accept the challenge to reach 100 million people with the Gospel by 2017 (the 500th anniversary of the Reformation) and to seek to raise $100 million over and above the current mission budget for additional mission support by 2010. The fund-raising effort, subsequently titled "Fan Into Flame," was reported to have raised $58,900,172 as of July 1, 2010 with additional $40 million in major gift requests pending at the time of the 2010 synod convention.

Only one passing reference to the Ablaze! initiative and no references to "Fan Into Flame" appeared in the synod's Convention Proceedings for its national conventions in 2013, 2016, and 2019 after the election of Matthew Harrison as synod president in 2010. Delegates reaffirmed the synod's commitment to its stated mission under the triennial emphasis names of "Witness, Mercy, Life Together" (2013–2019) and "Making Disciples for Life" (since 2019), together with the adoption of specific mission priorities. A final report on the outcomes and costs of the "Fan Into Flame" fundraising campaign was published in the 2013 Convention Workbook distributed to the Synod's member congregations and delegates prior to that convention, with a shorter summary final campaign report made available to LCMS member congregations in April 2012. Campaign participants contributed $55,136,989 with an additional $14,174,732 pledged, of which $5,397,297 had to be written off as uncollectable due to personal economic realities or changes in commitment among donors due to Kieschnick's loss in the 2010 election. The campaign ultimately incurred $19,882,793 in related expenses. Among the campaign's successes was the rejuvenation of financial support for LCMS missionaries by testing and adopting a network-based direct funding model widely used among non-Lutheran evangelical Christian bodies and groups.

== Reelection and second term ==
In 2004, Kieschnick won reelection to the presidency on the first ballot with 653 votes (53 percent of 1,237 votes cast for five nominees). First Vice President Daniel Preus was second among the five nominees with 391 votes (32% of ballots cast). William R. Diekelman, president of the synod's Oklahoma District, subsequently defeated Preus on the second ballot for first vice president with 52% of the votes cast.

=== Blue Ribbon Task Force on Synod Structure and Governance ===
On June 10, 2005, Kieschnick sent a memo to selected leaders in the LCMS who had agreed to serve on a newly created panel titled the "Blue Ribbon Task Force on Synodical Structure and Governance" (the word "synodical" in the title was later changed to "synod"), also to be known as the BRTFSSG. Kieschnick wrote to the BRTFSSG members, "I am asking the task force to do a thorough, zero-based assessment of the entirety of the system of governance and organizational structure of The Lutheran Church–Missouri Synod and to make recommendations for improvements in the form of a report to the 2007 Synodical [sic] convention. Your recommended improvements should suggest a form of structure and governance for the decades ahead that is appropriately representative, incorporating sufficient checks and balances of authority without being cumbersome, clumsy, or excessively complex. It should facilitate maximum operating efficiency in behalf of and in support of members of our Synod in accomplishing the mission of our Lord and HIs church."

In a March 1, 2005, pastoral letter to the synod, Kieschnick had written, "There is a great need for a thorough and fundamental review of what our Synod is, how it is organized, and how it functions. What was first created as an organizational system for a Synod made up of a small number of congregations now struggles to serve more than 6,150 congregations."

The work of the BRTFSSG extended beyond the 2007 convention, and its final report was not issued until October 2009, about nine months prior to the 2010 convention (see under "Reelection and third term," below).

== Reelection and third term ==
At the 2007 convention of the LCMS, Kieschnick was reelected on the first ballot, receiving 52.3 percent of the total vote.

=== Blue Ribbon Task Force on Synod Structure and Governance (continued) ===
Although the Blue Ribbon Task Force on Synod Structure and Governance was to have finished its work in time for the 2007 convention, it did not. Work continued throughout Kieschnick's third term.

At the end of 2007, Kieschnick discussed the task force's work in "President's Leadership News," distributed as a supplement to the synod's Reporter newspaper. "The work of the Blue Ribbon Task Force on Synod Structure and Governance is about improving our ability, in the words of the Synod’s mission statement, 'vigorously to make known the love of Christ by word and deed within our churches, communities, and the world,'" Kieschnick wrote. He added that its work is about "doing everything humanly possible to ensure for the Synod a viable future so that it can continue to carry out this mission for years to come."

Two years later, on October 15, 2009, the task force issued its final report in anticipation of the 2010 Synod convention. The report made 21 specific recommendations. One of those recommendations spoke to the structure of the "corporate Synod". When the report was written, the structure included seven program boards and six commissions, most with staff, that carried out functions outlined in the synod's bylaws. The task force said that while the boards and commissions are accountable to the synod convention, they operate independently of each other "to some extent as a series of silos". The task force wrote that this structure lacks accountability to the needs of congregations, is inefficient and expensive, and creates complications in business oversight and legal compliance. It therefore recommended a new structure that would realign national ministries around two "mission commissions", one for national mission and one for international mission. Each commission would have a staff that would be responsible to the president of the LCMS through a "chief mission officer" appointed by the president with the concurrence of the synod's board of directors.

Kieschnick issued a response to the 21 task force recommendations, which he generally supported. Regarding the recommendation for major change in the structure of the corporate synod, its newspaper reported, "Kieschnick supports the recommendation to eliminate the current boards and commissions, stating it would solve the problems of supervision and accountability within the Synod structure. But he also says that having the chief mission officer accountable to him 'could be seen as concentration of excessive authority in the office of the Synod president. That is neither the task force’s intention nor my desire.'”

In a pre-convention issue of the Reporter, nominees for president responded to a question about their support for the task force's recommendations. Kieschnick wrote, "For more than four years task force members have addressed challenges in our Synod—unnecessary bureaucracy, lack of coordination, ambiguous supervisory relationships, inequitable representation, inefficient organization, insufficient accountability, etc. They have sought and responded to feedback from convention delegates and other leaders. While having expressed a few concerns, I believe task force recommendations are critical." Taking a different view was Rev. Matthew C. Harrison, executive director of LCMS World Relief and Human Care, also nominated for president, who wrote, "Part of me might like the massive increase in power proposed for the Synod President. That’s why it’s not a good idea."

== 2010 election ==
On July 13, 2010, Kieschnick was defeated for re-election to a fourth term of office by Harrison. The vote was 643 to 527. The same convention adopted many of the recommendations of the Blue Ribbon Task Force on Synod Structure and Governance, including the provision that program staff would be accountable to the Synod's member congregations through the synod president, the structure of which included a new "chief mission officer", rather than separate program boards and appointed executives. Support services personnel would be accountable to the Synod board of directors, not the synod president, through the chief financial officer or chief administrative officer. Those positions would be appointed by the Synod's board of directors.

== Post-presidency ==
On March 1, 2011, Concordia University Texas announced that it had engaged Kieschnick to fill the newly created position of Presidential Ambassador for Mission Advancement, a position he held through 2015. In January 2016, Kieschnick returned to the Lutheran Foundation of Texas, becoming its CEO on January 1, 2017. In January 2017, the Lutheran Foundation of Texas changed its name to Legacy Deo. It encourages estate planning and charitable giving, with a mission to "inspire giving that impacts life forever". He retired from Legacy Deo in 2025 after 14 years of service. In May 2024, Kieschnick appeared on the video podcast Lead Time and aired his grievances about the current synodical leadership.

== Sources ==
=== Newspaper articles ===
- Patricia Rice, "Missouri Synod Elects Moderate as President," St. Louis Post-Dispatch, 16 July 2001.
- "Houston native takes synod helm," Houston Chronicle, 21 July 2001.
- Tom Heinen, "Lutherans' doctrinal clash builds," Milwaukee Journal Sentinel, 21 July 2001.
- Tim Townsend, "Church leader faces reelection fight," St. Louis Post-Dispatch, 11 July 2004.
- Adam Jadhav, "Embattled Lutheran president wins vote," St. Louis Post-Dispatch, 21 July 2004.
- "Amendment A falls short of affirmation," LCMS Reporter, March 2005.
- LCMS Q-&-A document on Amendment A (PDF), 2004.
- Mollie Ziegler Hemingway, "Radio Silence", Wall Street Journal 28 March 2008.

Religious titles
| Preceded by Robert T. Kuhn | President; Lutheran Church–Missouri Synod; 2001–2010 | Succeeded by Matthew C. Harrison |
