= Northern Illinois District of the Lutheran Church – Missouri Synod =

Subdivision of Christian denomination in the U.S.

Northern Illinois District of the LCMS

Location
- Country: United States
- Territory: Northern Illinois
- Headquarters: River Forest, Illinois

Statistics
- Congregations: 226
- Schools: 54 preschool; 67 elementary; 9 secondary
- Members: 127,000

Information
- Denomination: Lutheran Church – Missouri Synod
- Established: 1907

Current leadership
- President: Rev. Dr. Allan R. Buss

Map
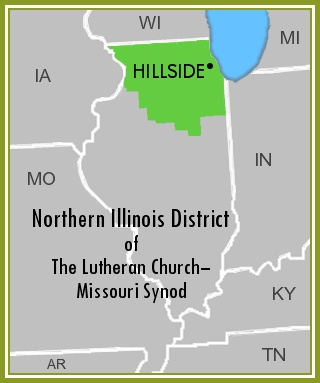

Website
- www.nidlcms.org

The Northern Illinois District is one of the 35 districts of the Lutheran Church – Missouri Synod (LCMS), and covers the northern third of the state of Illinois, including the Illinois portions of the Chicago metropolitan area; the rest of the state is divided between the Central Illinois District and the Southern Illinois District. In addition, 26 congregations in the Chicago area (20 of them in the city itself) are in the non-geographic English District, and five congregations in northern Illinois (including one in Chicago) are in the SELC District. The Northern Illinois District includes approximately 226 congregations and missions, subdivided into 28 circuits, as well as 54 preschools, 67 elementary schools, and 9 high schools. The district has approximately 127,000 baptized members.

The Northern Illinois District was formed in 1907 when the Illinois District was divided. District offices are located in River Forest, Illinois, on the campus of Concordia University Chicago. Delegates from each congregation meet in convention every three years to elect the district president, four vice presidents, circuit counselors, a board of directors, and other officers. The Rev. Dan Gilbert became the district president in September 2006 was re-elected to a third term in 2012. After the Rev. Dan Gilbert reached his term limits in 2018, Rev. Dr. Allan R. Buss was elected as the district president.

Concordia University Chicago in River Forest, Illinois, part of the LCMS' Concordia University System, is located within the district.

== Presidents ==
- Rev. Hermann Engelbrecht, Sr., 1907–1909
- Rev. William Christian Kohn, 1909–1913
- Rev. Friedrich Heinrich Brunn, 1913–1927
- Rev. Alex Ullrich, 1927–1936
- Rev. Ernest Theodore Lams, 1936–1945
- Rev. Arthur Henry Werfelmann, 1945–1960
- Rev. Theodore F. Nickel, 1960–1962
- Rev. Carl L. Abel, 1962–1963
- Rev. Erwin L. Paul, 1963–1966
- Rev. Edmund H. Happel, 1966–1985
- Rev. Theodore L. Laesch, 1985–1997
- Rev. William H. Ameiss, 1997–2006
- Rev. Dan P. Gilbert, 2006–2018
- Rev. Dr. Allan R. Buss, 2018–present
