= Ernst G. W. Keyl =

German-born Lutheran clergyman

Ernst Gerhard Wilhelm Keyl
- Born: May 22, 1804; Leipzig, Germany
- Died: August 4, 1872 (aged 68); Monroe, Michigan
- Education: Leipzig University, 1829
- Occupation: Pastor
- Years active: 1829–1871
- Title: President, Eastern District of the Lutheran Church–Missouri Synod
- Term: 1854–1869

Ernst Gerhard Wilhelm Keyl (May 22, 1804 in Leipzig, Germany – August 4, 1872 in Monroe, Michigan) was a German-born Lutheran clergyman who worked in the United States. He was a founder and the first president of the Eastern District of the Lutheran Church–Missouri Synod's (LCMS).

== Biography ==
Keyl graduated from Leipzig University in 1829 and served as a pastor Niederfrohna, near Penig, beginning in 1829. As a follower of Martin Stephan, he emigrated to the United States in 1839 in the Saxon Emigration. He later served as pastor in Frohna, Missouri (1839–1847); Freistadt and Milwaukee, Wisconsin (1847–1850); Baltimore, Maryland (1850–1869); and Willshire, Ohio. (1869–1871). He was the first president of the Eastern District of the LCMS from 1854 to 1869). He was a scholar of the life and work of Martin Luther.

== Works ==
- Lutherophilus (St. Louis, 1854)
- Katechismus-Auslegung aus Dr. Luther's Schriften (4 vols., 1853–68)
- Predigt-Entwürfe über die Sonn und Festtags-Evangelien aus Dr. Luther's Predigten (1866)

His biography was published by J. F. Kostering (St. Louis, 1882).
