= Florida–Georgia District of the Lutheran Church – Missouri Synod =

Subdivision of Christian denomination in the U.S.

Florida-Georgia District of the LCMS

Location
- Country: United States
- Territory: Georgia, Florida (except for the Panhandle), the Bahamas
- Headquarters: Orlando, Florida

Statistics
- Congregations: 203
- Schools: 45 preschool; 35 elementary; 2 secondary
- Members: 53,800

Information
- Denomination: Lutheran Church – Missouri Synod
- Established: 1948

Current leadership
- President: Rev. James H. Rockey

Map
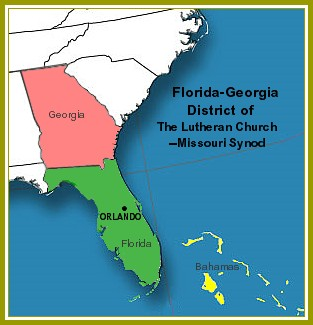

Website
- www.flga-lcms.org

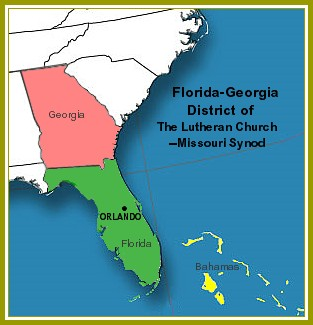
The Florida-Georgia District encompasses the states of Georgia and Florida, with the exception of the Florida Panhandle. It also includes the only LCMS congregation in the Bahamas. The district office is located in Orlando, Florida.

The Florida–Georgia District is one of the 35 districts of the Lutheran Church – Missouri Synod (LCMS), and encompasses the states of Georgia and Florida, with the exception of the Florida Panhandle which is part of the Southern District; in addition, four Florida congregations and two Georgia congregations are in the non-geographic English District, and four more Florida congregations are in the non-geographic SELC District. The Florida-Georgia District includes approximately 203 congregations and missions, subdivided into 22 circuits, as well as 45 preschools, 35 elementary schools, and 2 high schools. Baptized membership in district congregations is approximately 53,800.

The Florida–Georgia District was formed in 1948 out of the Southern District, with a number of Georgia congregations also moving from the Southeastern District. District offices are located in Orlando, Florida. Delegates from each congregation meet in convention every three years to elect the district president, vice presidents, circuit counselors, a board of directors, and other officers. The Rev. James H. Rockey was elected District President in 2022.

== Presidents ==
- Rev. Conrad F. Kellermann, 1948–1957
- Rev. Frederick W. Lorberg, 1957–1963
- Rev. August Bernthal, 1963–1974
- Rev. L. Lloyd Behnken, 1974–1987 (died in office)
- Rev. Thomas R. Zehnder, 1987–1997
- Rev. Edgar Trinklein, 1997
- Rev. Gerhard C. Michael Jr., 1997–2009
- Rev. Greg Walton, 2009–2022
- Rev. James H. Rockey, 2022–current
