= Reachout Trust =

British evangelical Christian organisation

- Logo, Reachout Trust
- Formation: 1982
- Type: Evangelical Christian Ministry
- Headquarters: Swansea
- Location: United Kingdom
- Official language: English
- Chairman: Michael Thomas
- Website: http://reachouttrust.org/

Reachout Trust is a British evangelical Christian organisation. Its stated aims are to "examine in the light of the Christian gospel the beliefs and practices of people within the cults, occults, new age and all not upholding to biblical truth."

Reachout Trust addresses many different groups including Jehovah's Witnesses, the Latter Day Saint movement, and Christadelphians as well as the occult and New Age. Reachout Trust also produce information about other groups and religions and writes about various influential Christian figures (such as tele-evangelists and authors) and various groups within non-evangelical Christianity, such as Roman Catholicism.

Reachout Trust communicates the perceived dangers of those groups' beliefs and/or practices to the evangelical Christian community and presents the Christian gospel from an evangelical perspective to members of those groups. Reachout also teaches the Christian Church about biblical warnings concerning error and how to engage with those holding to ideas the Bible identifies as errors. The organisation is based in Swansea. Reachout Trust produces articles on their website, and on a blog, publish books and booklets, have a YouTube channel, as well as having a presence on social media. They also visit interested churches and groups.

== History ==
The organisation was formed in 1982, under director Doug Harris. Their first newsletter, produced in 1984, was four pages long and consisted of a few hundred photocopies. That grew to a Quarterly sixteen pages sent out to several thousand individuals and churches across the country. These days the newsletter is online. In 1988, they published Awake! To the Watch Tower by Doug Harris, later cited as a reference by Linda Edwards and Robert Crompton. In 1996 they published Mormonism A Gold Plated Religion by Michael and Ann Thomas.

The first Reachout Convention was held in New Malden Baptist Church in 1984. After that, it moved to Kingstanding Elim Church until 1991 when it was held at the Wycliffe Centre at High Wycombe. Having outgrown that venue, it moved in 1996 to the Pioneer Centre near Kidderminster. In 2008, it again moved to the more central location of Hothorpe Hall, Leicestershire. Since Doug Harris's death in 2013 the trust has moved more towards small groups, visiting churches, and online ministry. The first conference in ten years was held in September 2022 at the Hayes Conference Centre in Swanwick, Derbyshire. Having successfully held three conferences they are becoming again a fixture in the Reachout Trust year.

From a group of people at the first meeting, the organisation has grown to over a hundred attending a full weekend of seminars. Seminars and workshops cover all the main religions the Reachout Trust considers cults, including the LDS Church and Jehovah's Witnesses, but also other groups such as Freemasonry, as well as instruction in dealing with the occult and the New Age.

In 2002, David McKay of the group the Jesus Christians contacted the Reachout Trust through a pseudonym in order to elicit a response which he could then utilise to manipulate the media. McKay's plan backfired, and the results were documented in an article in The Guardian. Also in 2002, a member of the organisation commented on the potential influence of the film Harry Potter and the Chamber of Secrets on young children, stating that it may influence children to explore the occult. In 2004, the organisation held a three-day conference in order to assist and consult with families affected by cults and the occult.

In 2013 Reachout's founder, Doug Harris, died following a short illness. At the invitation of the trustees the leadership of the trust was taken up by Michael Thomas, a former Mormon and long-time friend and director of the trust, who worked alongside Harris for many years.
