= Robert T. Kuhn =

American Lutheran church leader (1937–2025)

- Born: April 5, 1937
- Died: March 1, 2025 (aged 87)
- Church: Lutheran Church – Missouri Synod (LCMS)
- Ordained: June 29, 1958
- Offices held: President, LCMS (2001)

Robert T. Kuhn (April 5, 1937 – March 1, 2025) was an American Christian leader who was the 11th president of the Lutheran Church – Missouri Synod (LCMS), serving from March to August 2001. As first vice president, Kuhn assumed the office of president of the synod in 2001 following the death of President Alvin L. Barry. He later served as the East-Southeast Region Vice President of the LCMS.

Prior to serving as synodical president, Kuhn served as pastor of various congregations, president of the Central Illinois District of the LCMS from 1989 to 1995, and First Vice President of the LCMS from September 1995 through March 2001. He resided in Oviedo, Florida. Kuhn died on March 1, 2025, at the age of 87.

Religious titles
Preceded by Alvin L. Barry	President; Lutheran Church–Missouri Synod; 2001	Succeeded by Gerald B. Kieschnick
