= Matthew Harrison (minister) =

21st-century American Lutheran Church official

The Reverend Matthew C. Harrison
- President
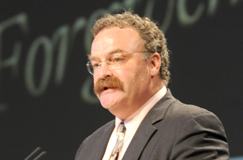
- Harrison in 2010
- Church: Lutheran Church–Missouri Synod
- Elected: July 13, 2010
- Installed: September 11, 2010
- Predecessor: Gerald B. Kieschnick
- Previous posts: Executive Director, LCMS World Relief/Human Care

Orders
- Ordination: 1991

Personal details
- Born: March 14, 1962 (age 64) Sioux City, Iowa
- Spouse: Kathy Harrison (née Schimm)
- Children: Two sons
- Education: Concordia Theological Seminary, Fort Wayne (M.S.T., 1991), (M.Div., 1989); Morningside College, Sioux City (1984)

Matthew Carl Harrison (born March 14, 1962) is the 13th and current president of the Lutheran Church–Missouri Synod (LCMS). As president, he is the chief ecclesiastical supervisor of the Synod and is responsible for the national program ministries of the LCMS, including the Office of International Mission, which calls and employs some 150 missionaries globally.

Harrison was first elected to the presidency on July 13, 2010, at the synod's 64th regular convention in Houston, Texas. Harrison officially took office on September 1, 2010, and was formally installed in a service on September 11, 2010, at Concordia Seminary in St. Louis. He was elected by a 54–45% margin on the first ballot. He was elected to a second three-year term following a first ballot victory in the church body's first online presidential election in July 2013 . He was elected to a third three-year term in June 2016, having received 56.96 percent of the vote on the first ballot. In June 2019, Harrison was elected to a fourth three-year term with 51.76 percent of the vote on the first ballot. In June 2023, he was elected to a fifth term with 52.32% of the first ballot vote. He was the first LCMS president elected to a fifth term since 1947. In June 2026, he was elected to a sixth term on the third ballot with 50.1% of the vote.

He had previously served as the Executive Director of the Department of LCMS World Relief and Human Care, and as founding president of the LCMS Housing Corporation (also known as Lutheran Housing Support).

== Early years ==
Harrison was born in Sioux City, Iowa, on March 14, 1962. He was baptized at Bethel Lutheran Church in Lawton, Iowa, and grew up in Sioux City, where his family belonged to Redeemer Lutheran Church. He graduated from Sioux City East High School in 1980 and Morningside College in 1987. Harrison then attended Concordia Theological Seminary in Fort Wayne, Indiana, from which he earned a Master of Divinity in 1989 and a Master of Sacred Theology degree in 1991. In 2011, he received honorary doctorates from Concordia Theological Seminary and from Concordia University Ann Arbor in Michigan.

== Ministry ==
Harrison's first parish was at St. Peter's Lutheran Church in Westgate, Iowa, where he served from 1991 to 1995.

Harrison served as pastor of Zion Lutheran Church of Fort Wayne, Indiana, from 1995 to 2001. During his ministry at Zion, the urban decay around the church moved him to join with St. Peter Catholic Church and community leaders to revitalize the Hanna-Creighton neighborhood. This joint effort recruited investors to clear many dilapidated homes, restore others, and build new ones in the ten block area. The effort was a success and led to the construction of a new branch of the Allen County Public Library and an office for the Fort Wayne Urban League in the neighborhood. This initiative continues in the City of Fort Wayne's Renaissance Pointe project.

In Harrison's role as head of LCMS World Relief beginning in 2001, he made several trips to work with those in need among the slums of Kibera, Kenya, and in other East African countries. He worked in Asia following the 2004 Indian Ocean earthquake and tsunami and in Louisiana in 2005 following Hurricane Katrina. He also spent several months in early 2010 coordinating LCMS aid in Haiti following the 2010 Haiti earthquake.

On February 16, 2012, Harrison testified in front of the United States House Committee on Oversight and Government Reform in opposition to contraceptive mandates imposed upon parachurch organizations by the Patient Protection and Affordable Care Act.

== Works ==
=== As author ===
- Christ Have Mercy: How to Put Your Faith in Action. St. Louis, MO: Concordia Publishing House, 2008.
- In the Beginning: A Collection of Essays and Bible Studies on the Sanctity of Early Human Life. With Charles P. Arand and James Lamb. St. Louis, MO: Concordia Publishing House, 2007.
- It's Time: LCMS Unity and Mission: the Real Problem We Face and How to Solve It. n.p., 2008.
- A Little Book on Joy: the Secret of Living a Good News Life in a Bad News World. Lutheran Legacy, 2009. Re-published by Concordia Publishing House, 2011.
- Sanctification and Charitable Works in Lutheran Theology. Lutheran Church—Missouri Synod Board of World Relief and Human Care, 2006
- Sermon on John 14:1–14 at Concordia Theological Seminary's Kramer Chapel, April 30, 2010.
- Letters from a Pastor's Heart. St. Louis, MO: Concordia Publishing House, 2016.
- Why Am I Joy:fully Lutheran?: Instruction, Meditation, and Prayers on Luther's Small Catechism. St. Louis, MO: Concordia Publishing House, 2018.

=== As translator and editor ===
- Gerhard, Johann. Meditations on Divine Mercy: A Classic Treasury of Devotional Prayers. Saint Louis: Concordia Pub. House, 2003.
- Löhe, Wilhelm, Holger Sonntag, Adriane Dorr, and Philip Hendrickson. Löhe on Mercy: Six Chapters for Everyone, the Seventh for the Servants of Mercy, 1858-1860. [Mercy insights series]. St. Louis: Lutheran Church—Missouri Synod, World Relief and Human Care, 2006.
- Sasse, Hermann. Christ and His Church: Essays by Hermann Sasse. With Ronald R. Feuerhahn and Paul T. McCain. Office of the President of the LCMS, 1997.
- Sasse, Hermann, Letters to Lutheran Pastors. Ed. With Charles Evanson, W. Gawrisch, Ralph Gehrke, Fred Kramer, Rachel Mumme, Norman Nagel, Paul Peters, Peter Petzling, E. Reim, J. Michael Reu, David P. Scaer, Charles Schaum, Andrew Smith, Holgar Sonntag, Paul Strawn, W. Wegner, trans. 3 vols. St. Louis, MO: Concordia Publishing House, 2013-15.
- Sasse, Hermann. The Lonely Way: Selected Essays and Letters. With Ronald R. Feuerhahn, eds. and trans. 2 vols. St. Louis, MO: Concordia Pub. House, 2001.
- Sasse, Hermann. Union and Confession. With Ronald R. Feuerhahn and Paul T. McCain. Office of the President of the LCMS, 1997.
- Walther, C.F.W., Friedrich Wyneken, H. C. Schwan, Franz Pieper, Friedrich Pfotenhauer, W. Sihler, and Theodor Julius Brohm. At Home in the House of My Fathers: Presidential Sermons, Essays, Letters, and Addresses from the Missouri Synod's Great Era of Unity and Growth. [Fort Wayne, IN]: Lutheran Legacy, 2009.
- Women Pastors?: The Ordination of Women in Biblical Lutheran Perspective: a Collection of Essays. With John T. Pless, eds. St. Louis, MO: Concordia Pub. House, 2009.
- Closed Communion?: Admission to the Lord's Supper in Biblical Lutheran Perspective. With John T. Pless, eds. St. Louis, MO: Concordia Pub. House, 2017.

Religious titles
Preceded by Gerald B. Kieschnick	President of the Lutheran Church–Missouri Synod; 2010–present	Incumbent
