= Southeastern District of the Lutheran Church – Missouri Synod =

Subdivision of Christian denomination in the U.S.

Southeastern District of the LCMS

Location
- Country: United States
- Territory: Delaware, North Carolina, South Carolina, Virginia, Maryland (excluding Garrett County), York and Lancaster counties in Pennsylvania, and Washington, D.C.
- Headquarters: Richmond, Virginia

Statistics
- Congregations: 212
- Schools: 64 preschool; 21 elementary; 3 secondary
- Members: 52,056

Information
- Denomination: Lutheran Church – Missouri Synod
- Established: 1939

Current leadership
- President: Rev. Dr. William Harmon

Map
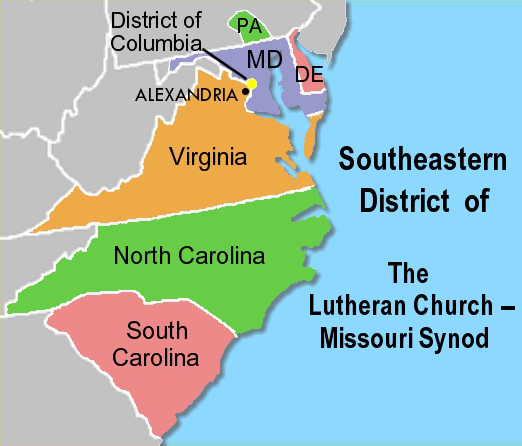

Website
- se.lcms.org

The Southeastern District is one of the 35 districts of the Lutheran Church – Missouri Synod (LCMS). It encompasses Washington, D.C., and the states of Delaware, North Carolina, South Carolina, and Virginia, as well Maryland with the exception of Garrett County at its western end; it also includes York and Lancaster Counties in Pennsylvania. Garrett County and the rest of Pennsylvania are part of the Eastern District; also, one Virginia congregation is in the non-geographic English District, and two of the state's congregations are in the SELC District. The Southeastern District includes approximately 219 congregations and missions, subdivided into 19 circuits, as well as 64 preschools, 21 elementary schools, and three high schools. Baptized membership in district congregations is over 52,000.

The Southeastern District was formed in 1939 out of the Eastern District, and also incorporated a number of congregations which had previously been in the English District – including those in the Carolinas and part of Georgia; the Georgia areas were separated into the Florida–Georgia District in 1948. District offices are located in Richmond, Virginia, relocating there from Arlington, Virginia in 2023. Delegates from each congregation meet in convention every three years to elect the district president, vice presidents, circuit counselors, a board of directors, and other officers. The Rev. Dr. William Harmon was elected and installed as district president in 2022.

== Presidents ==
- Rev. J. George Spilman, 1939–1945
- Rev. Oscar Adelbert Saner, 1945–1948
- Rev. Rudolph Stang Ressmeyer, 1948–1954
- Rev. William H. Kohn, 1954–1959
- Rev. Leslie F. Frerking, 1959–1963
- Rev. William H. Kohn, 1963–1967
- Rev. Martin C. Poch, 1967–1970
- Rev. Charles S. Mueller, 1970–1978
- Rev. Richard T. Hinz, 1978–1994
- Rev. Roy A. Maack, 1994–1997
- Rev. Dr. Arthur W. Scherer, 1997–2003
- Rev. Dr. Jon T. Diefenthaler, 2003–2012
- Rev. Dr. John R. Denninger, 2012–2022
- Rev. Dr. William Harmon, 2022–present

== External links8 ==
- Southeastern District web site
- LCMS: Southeastern District
- LCMS Congregation Directory
