= Atlantic District of the Lutheran Church – Missouri Synod =

Subdivision of Christian denomination in the U.S.

Atlantic District of the LCMS

Location
- Country: United States
- Territory: Eastern New York state
- Headquarters: New York, New York

Statistics
- Congregations: 98
- Schools: 31 preschool; 15 elementary; 5 secondary
- Members: 26,000

Information
- Denomination: Lutheran Church – Missouri Synod
- Established: 1906

Current leadership
- Bishop/President: Rev. Dien Taylor

Map
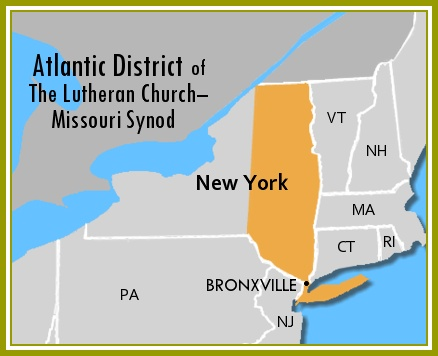

Website
- www.ad-lcms.org

The Atlantic District is one of the 35 districts of the Lutheran Church – Missouri Synod (LCMS) and covers eastern New York state: New York City, Long Island, the Hudson Valley, and the Capital District. It comprises approximately 100 congregations and a number of mission stations, subdivided into 9 circuits, as well as 31 preschools, 15 elementary schools, and 5 high schools. Baptized membership in Atlantic District congregations is approximately 26,000. The rest of New York is included in the Eastern District; in addition, four congregations in the New York City area are in the non-geographic English District, and one congregation in Yonkers is in the SELC District.

The Atlantic District was separated from the Eastern District in May 1906. Portions of the district were split off into the New England District and the New Jersey District in 1972. District offices are located in New York, New York. Delegates from each congregation meet in convention every three years to elect the district president, vice presidents, circuit counselors, a board of directors, and other officers. Derek Lecakes was re-elected as the district president at the 61st Regular Convention that was held on July 22–23, 2022, at Our Savior's Lutheran Church in Albany, New York. He subsequently was replaced by Dien Ashley Taylor, who had been elected first vice president at the convention.

Concordia College (New York), which was part of the LCMS's Concordia University System, ceased offering classes as of August 2021, with a final conferral of degrees in December 2021. A district congregation, the Evangelical Lutheran Church of Saint Matthew, in Washington Heights, Manhattan, was founded in 1664 and is the oldest congregation in the LCMS.

== Bishops/Presidents ==
- Rev. Ernst C. L. Schulze, 1906–1918
- Rev. Philip H. L. Birkner, 1918–1930
- Rev. Arthur J. C. Brunn, 1930–1941
- Rev. George K. A. Koenig, 1941–1942
- Rev. Herman J. Rippe, 1942–1960
- Rev. Karl F. Graesser, 1960–1967
- Rev. Rudolph P. F. Ressmeyer, 1967–1976
- Rev. Henry L. Koepchen, 1976 (acting president)
- Rev. Ronald F. Fink, 1976–1989
- Rev. James Zwernemann, 1989–1991
- Rev. Dr. David H. Benke, 1991–2015
- Rev. Derek Lecakes, 2015–2022
- Rev. Dr. Dien Ashley Taylor, 2022–present

Ressmeyer was one of four district presidents who were removed from office by Synod President J. A. O. Preus on April 2, 1976, for non-compliance with synodical directives on the ordination and placement of improperly endorsed ministerial candidates from Seminex.

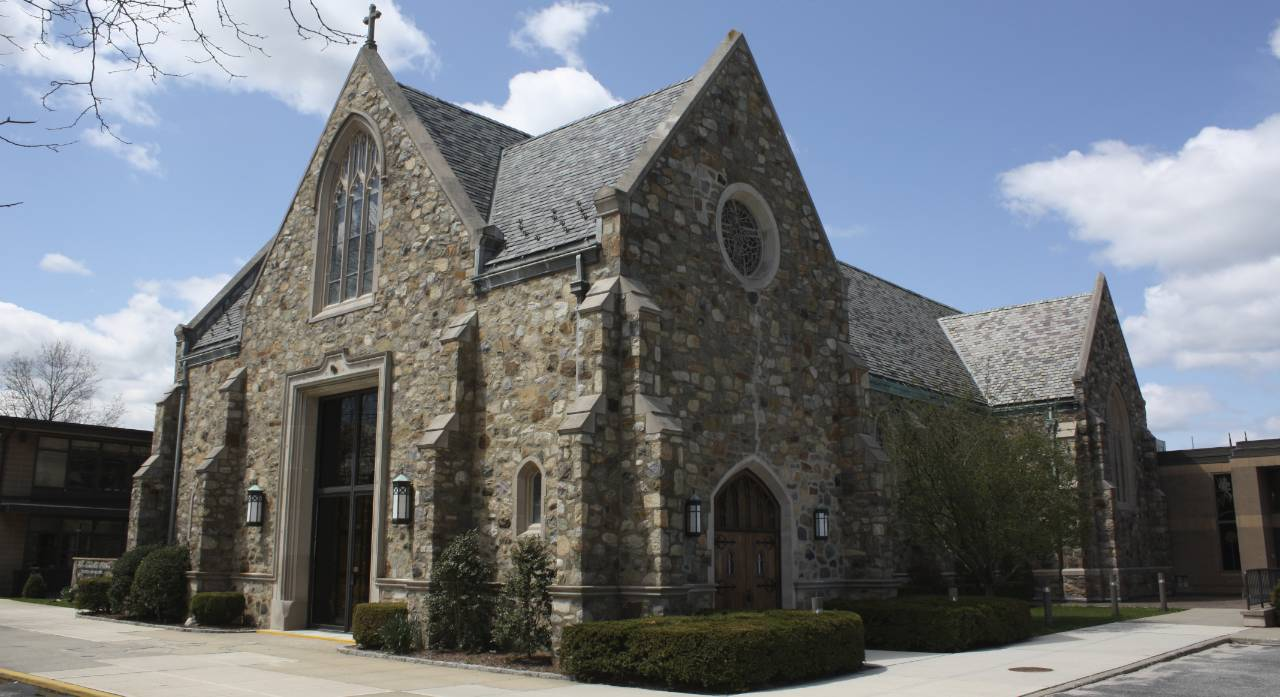
Trinity Lutheran Church in Hicksville, NY

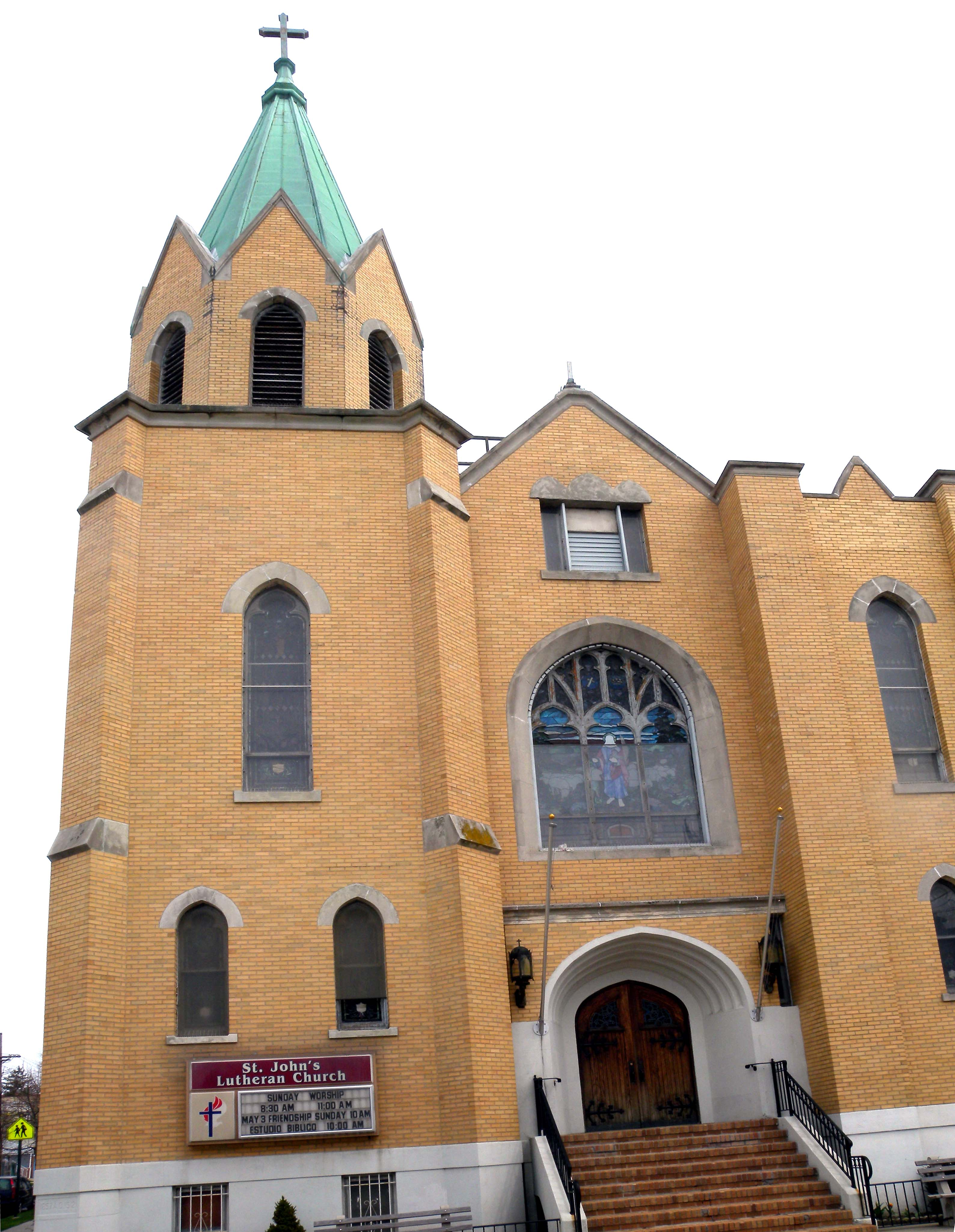
St John, College Point

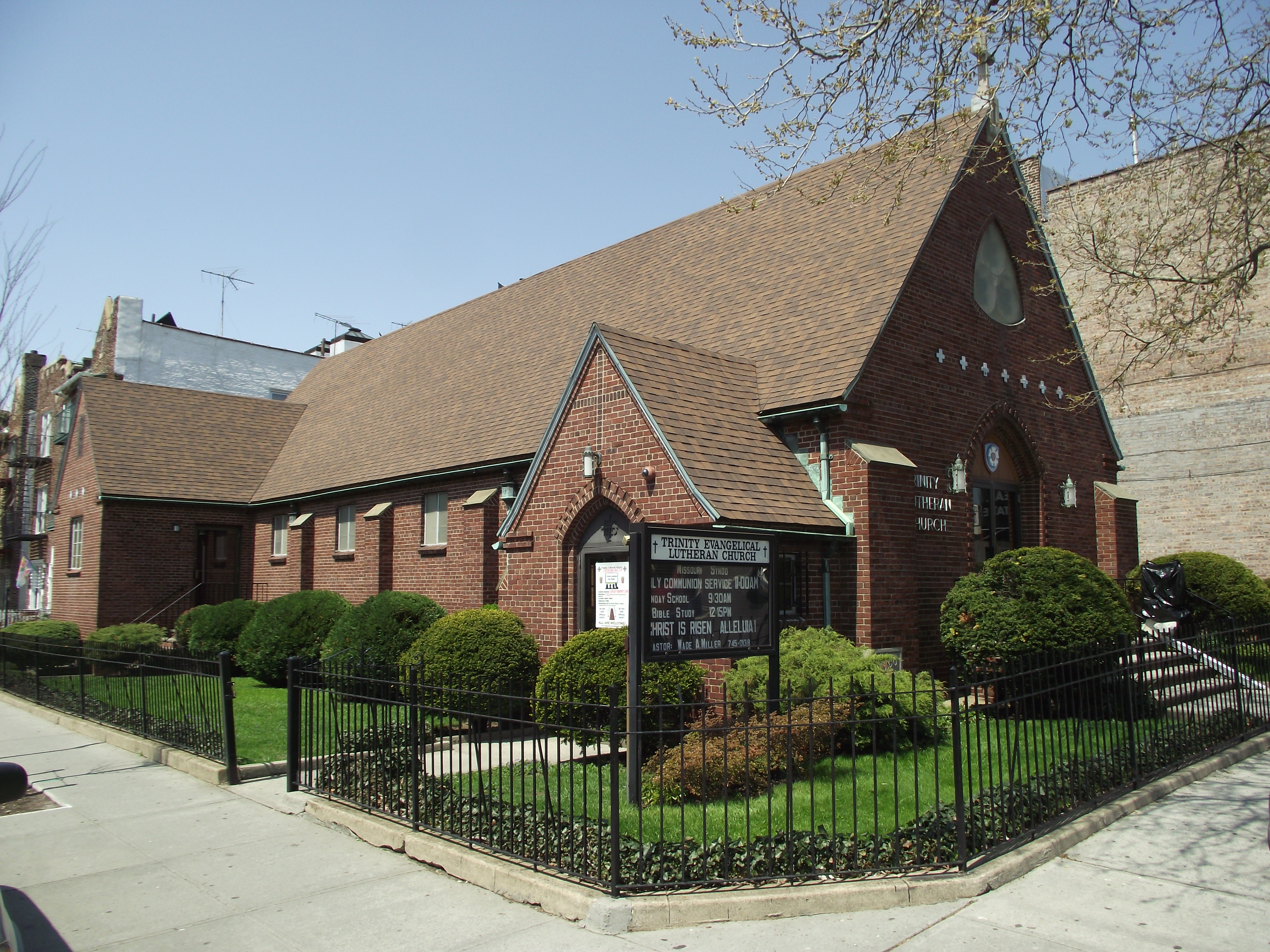
Trinity, Bay Ridge

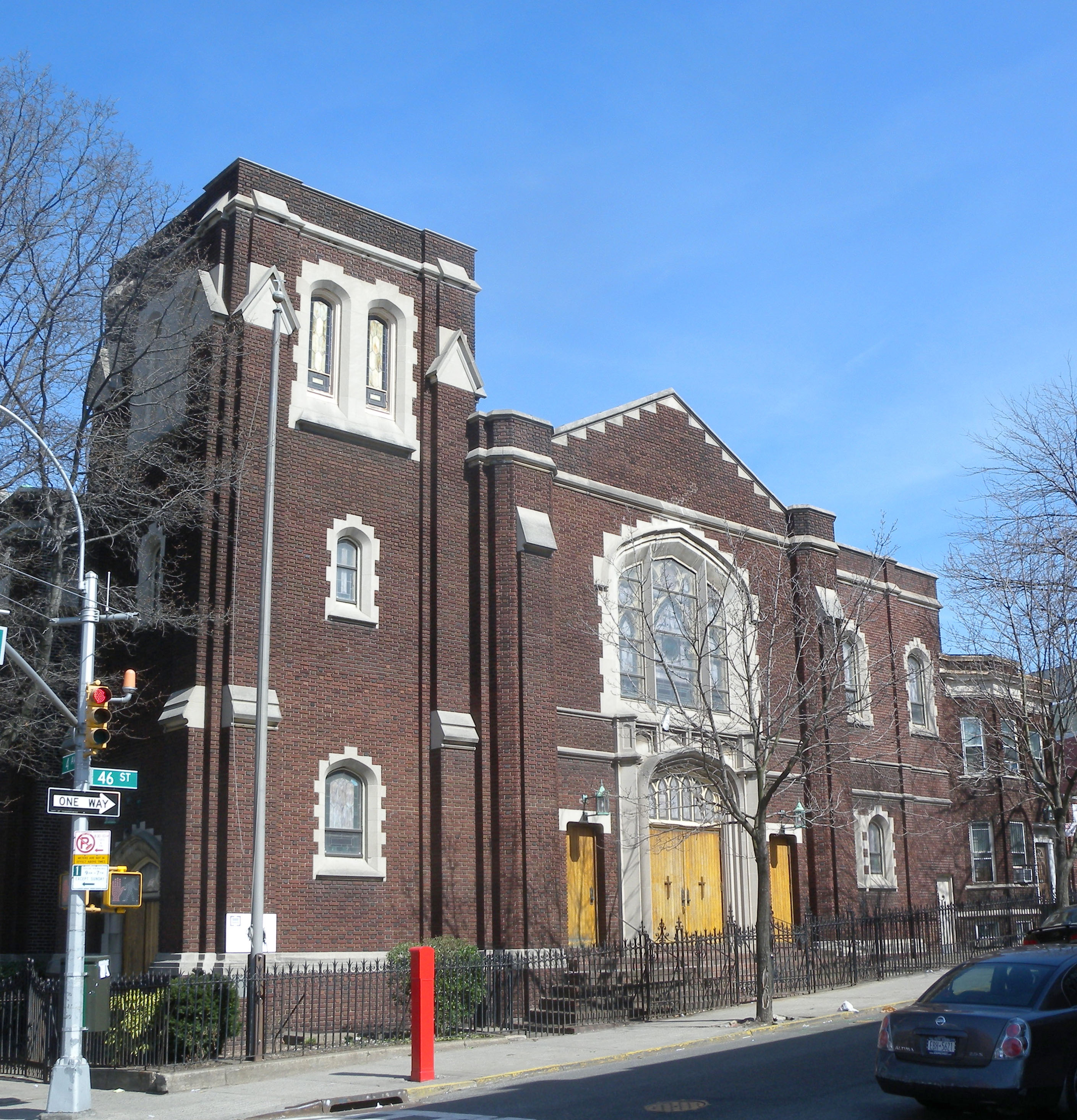
Trinity Lutheran, Sunset Park, Brooklyn
