= Kade =

Kade may refer to:

== People with the given name ==
- Kade Anderson (born 2004), American baseball player
- Kade Banks (born 2000), New Zealand rugby union footballer
- Kade Bell (born 1993), American football coach
- Kade Chandler (born 2000), Australian rules footballer
- Kade Craig (born 2002), English footballer
- Kade Dykes (born 2002), Australian rugby league footballer
- Kade Ferris (1969–2023), Native American anthropologist
- Kade Harvey (born 1975), Australian cricketer
- Kade Kolodjashnij (born 1995), Australian rules footballer
- Kade McClure (born 1996), American baseball player
- Kade Munday (born 1983), Australian cricketer
- Kade Pieper (born 2005), American football player
- Kade Poki (born 1988), New Zealand rugby union footballer
- Kade Ruotolo (born 2003), American mixed-martial artist
- Kade Simpson (born 1984), Australian rules footballer
- Kade Snowden (born 1986), Australian rugby league footballer
- Kade Stewart (born 1997), Australian rules footballer
- Kade Strowd (born 1997), American baseball player
- Kade L. Twist (born 1971), American Indigenous artist
- Kade Warner (born 1998), American football player
- Kade Weston (born 1986), American football player
- Kade Wolhuter (born 2001), South African rugby union player

== People with the surname ==
- Anton Kade (born 2004), German footballer
- Arthur Kade, American financial adviser
- Julius Kade (born 1999), German footballer
- Max Kade (1882–1967), German-American entrepreneur
- Otto Kade (1819–1900), German musicologist
- Otto Adolf Wenzel Kade (1927–1980), German linguist
- Stacey Kade, American author

== Places ==
- Kade, Germany
- Kade, Ghana
- Kade (Ghana parliament constituency)
- Kade Point, South Georgia

== Other uses ==
- Kade Hotspurs, Ghanaian soccer club in Kade, Ghana
- De Kade, a music venue in Zaandam, Netherlands

== See also ==
- Cade (disambiguation)
- Hitsertse Kade, a hamlet in the Netherlands
- Kade-Duesenberg German House and Cultural Center, Valparaiso University, Indiana, US
