= Robert V. Schnabel =

16th President of Valparaiso University
- In office 1978–1988
- Preceded by: Albert Huegli
- Succeeded by: Alan Harre

President of Concordia College (New York)
- In office 1971–1976

Personal details
- Born: September 28, 1922 Scarsdale, New York, United States
- Died: September 1, 2009 (aged 86) Angola, Indiana, United States
- Spouse: Ellen Foelber
- Children: 2

Academic background
- Education: Concordia College (New York), Concordia Seminary, Concordia Senior College, Indiana University, University of Michigan
- Alma mater: Bowdoin College; Fordham University

Academic work
- Institutions: Concordia College (New York); Wartburg College; Valparaiso University

Robert V. Schnabel was an American academic administrator who served as the 16th President of Valparaiso University from 1978 to 1988. He had previously served as President of Concordia College in Bronxville, New York, from 1971 to 1976.

== Early life and education ==
Schnabel was born on September 28, 1922, in Scarsdale, New York, to Frederick Victor Schnabel and Louise Frick.

He was a cum laude graduate of Bowdoin College in Brunswick, Maine. He received his master's and PhD in philosophy and education from Fordham University in New York City.

== Career ==
Schnabel taught philosophy at Concordia Senior College in Fort Wayne, Indiana, for 14 years, where he was also the chairman of the philosophy department and the academic dean.

=== President of Concordia College (Bronxville, NY) ===
In 1971, Schnabel was elected President of Concordia College in Bronxville, New York. During his presidency at Concordia, he transformed the college from a two-year to a four-year institution.

Schnabel, a moderate, clashed with the conservative Board of Directors who believed that college teachings should adhere strictly to the literal truths of the Bible. When the board voted on March 25, 1976, to change the college's hiring policy, Schnabel resigned from his position. Schnabel portrayed his resignation as a decision to return to the work he loved to do, but there were many indications that Schnabel's disagreement with the board over the matter of faculty appointments led him to conclude he could no longer function freely.

Dr. Herman K. Wentzel, the college's academic dean, called Schnabel's resignation a "great loss to the college."

=== Wartburg College ===
Schnabel was the Vice President of Academic Affairs and dean of faculty at Wartburg College in Waverly, Iowa.

=== President of Valparaiso University ===
In 1978, Schnabel was elected President of Valparaiso University in Valparaiso, Indiana. During his presidency, he worked to recruit academically stronger students and provide more support to the faculty, all while increasing standards in faculty research. He deemed this necessary to realize Valpo's goal of becoming a "national Lutheran University of high academic standing."

== Later life and death ==
After Schnabel's retirement, he and his wife travelled to more than 20 countries.

Schnabel died in Angola, Indiana on September 1, 2009.

A memorial service was held for him at the Peace Lutheran Church in Fremont, Indiana and the Chapel of the Resurrection at Valparaiso University in Valparaiso, Indiana.

== Legacy ==
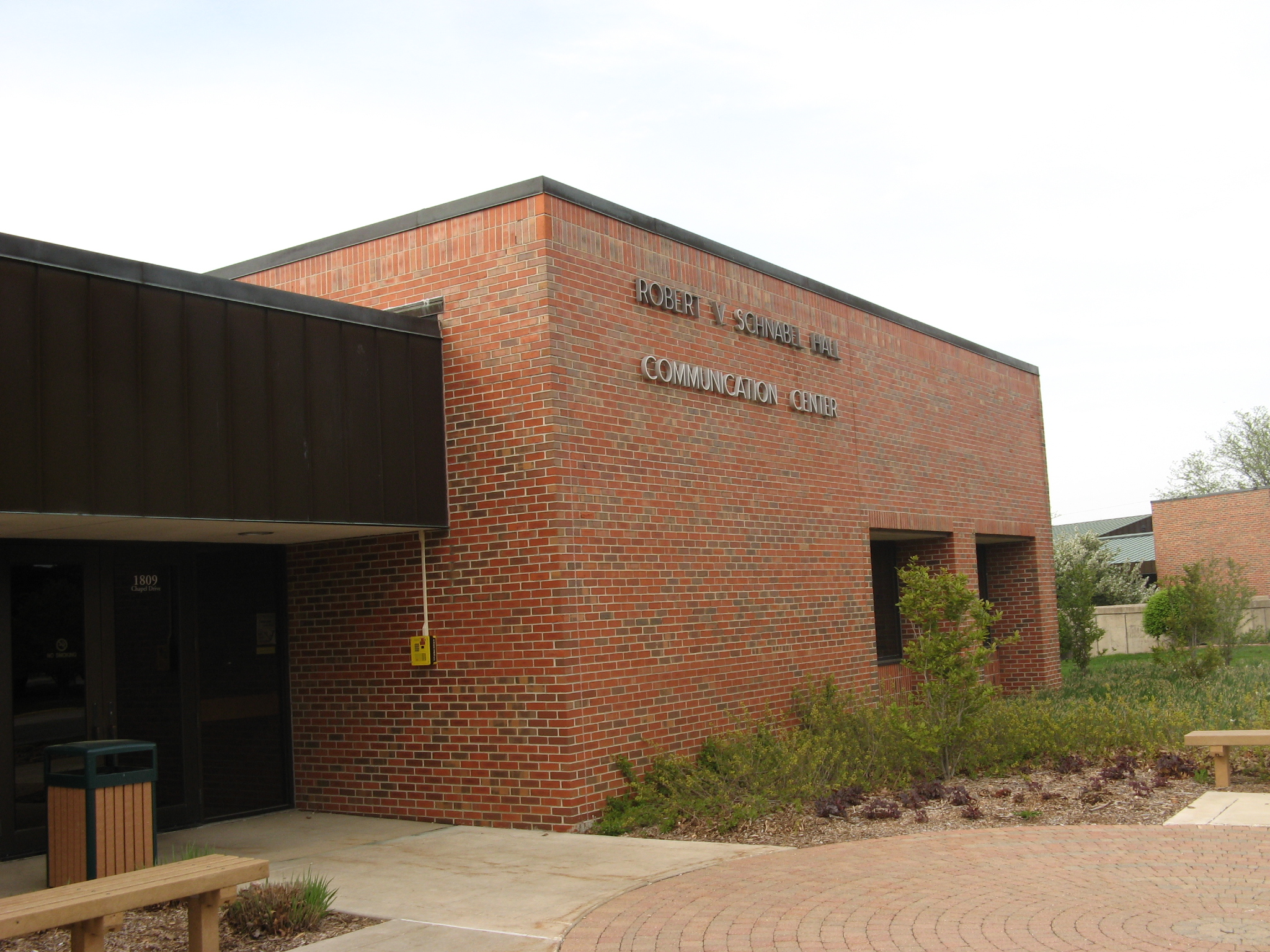
Schnabel Hall at Valparaiso University

Valparaiso University's Schnabel Hall is named after him.

Academic offices
Preceded by Albert G. Huegli	17th President of Valparaiso University; 1978-1988	Succeeded by Alan F. Harre
