= Cade =

Cade is a surname and male given name of English origin. It is most likely derived from the Middle English form of the Old English given name "Cada", which itself is derived from a number of Brittonic names beginning with "Catu", meaning "battle". In the United States, it is currently the 97th most popular baby name and 340th most popular male give name overall.

== Given name ==
- Cade Cavalli (born 1998), American baseball player
- Cade Cole (born 1983), American attorney
- Cade Courtley (born 1969), American television host
- Cade Cowell (born 2003), American soccer player
- Cade Cunningham (born 2001), American basketball player
- Cade Cust (born 1998), Australian rugby league footballer
- Cade Davis (born 1988), American basketball player
- Cade Doughty (born 2001), American baseball player
- Cade Fairchild (born 1989), American ice hockey player
- Cade Foehner (born 1996), American singer
- Cade Foster (born 1991), American football player
- Cade Gibson (born 1998), American baseball player
- Cade Horton (born 2001), American baseball player
- Cade Johnson (born 1999), American football player
- Cade Klubnik (born 2003), American football player
- Cade Marlowe (born 1997), American baseball player
- Cade Mays (born 1999), American football player
- Cade McNamara (born 2000), American football player
- Cade McNown (born 1977), American football player
- Cade Otton (born 1999), American football player
- Cade Povich (born 2000), American baseball player
- Cade Smith (born 1999), Canadian baseball player
- Cade Stover (born 2000), American football player
- Cade Townsend (born 2005), American baseball player
- Cade Tyson (born 2003), American basketball player
- Cade Uluave (born 2005), American football player
- Cade York (born 2001), American football player

== Surname ==
- Adrian Cade (born 1961), English cricketer
- Cathy Cade (born 1942), American photographer
- Ebb Cade (1890–1953), American construction worker
- Eddie Cade (born 1973), American football player
- Elsa Salazar Cade (born 1952), Mexican-American teacher
- Jack Cade (1???–1450), English rebel
- James Cade, Canadian actor
- Jamie Cade (born 1984), English footballer
- Joe Cade (1900–??), American baseball player
- Johanne Cade, American television personality
- John Cade (disambiguation), multiple people
- Lance Cade (1981–2010), American professional wrestler
- Lionel Cade (1918–1990), American politician
- Marilyn Cade (1947–2020), American activist
- Marina Cade (born 1969), Australian rower
- Michael Cade (born 1972), American actor
- Mossy Cade (born 1961), American football player
- Phil Cade (1916–2001), American race car driver
- Robert Cade (1927–2007), American physician
- Rosana Cade, Scottish performance artist
- Rowena Cade (1893–1983), English theatre director
- Salusbury Cade (1660–1720), English physician
- Stanford Cade (1895–1973), British surgeon
- Tom Cade (1928–2019), American ornithologist
- William Cade (1883–1957), Australian conductor
- William H. Cade, American zoologist

== Fictional characters ==
- Jubal Cade, in a series of novels by Angus Wells
- Sam Cade, protagonist of Cade's County, an American television series starring Glenn Ford
- the title character of Gunner Cade, an American science fiction novel by Cyril M. Kornbluth and Judith Merril
- the title character of Cade, a 1966 thriller novel by British writer James Hadley Chase
- Cade Langmore, a recurring character in the American television series Ozark
- Cade LaSalle, in the American television series NCIS: New Orleans
- Cade Merrill, the protagonist of The Blair Witch Files.
- Cade Skywalker, protagonist of the Star Wars Legacy comic book series
- Cade, in season 8 of the American television series The Vampire Diaries
