= WVUR-FM =

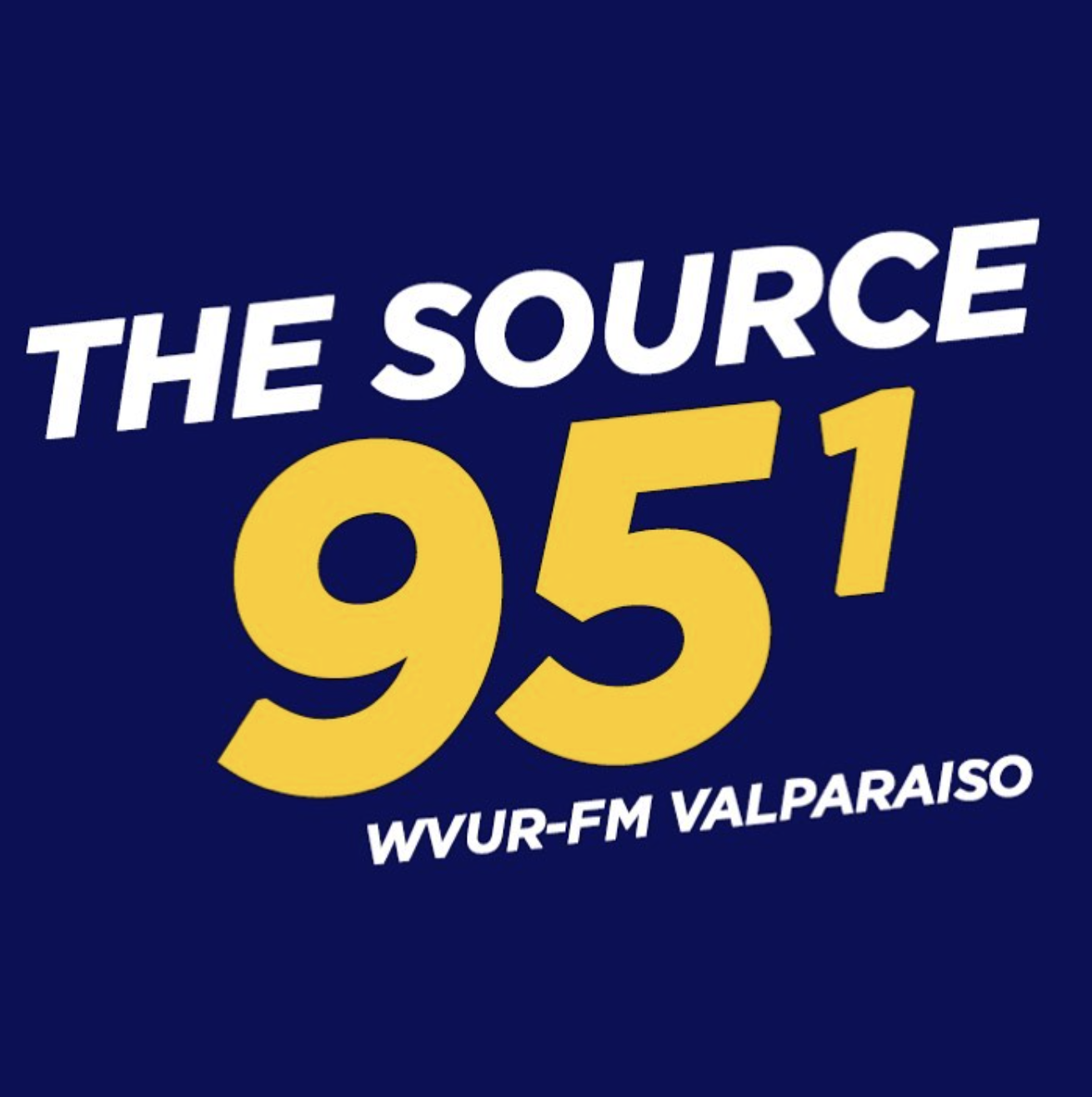
- Valparaiso, Indiana; United States
- Broadcast area: Six miles (9.7 km) radius from Valparaiso, Indiana
- Frequency: 95.1 MHz
- Branding: "The Source 95 WVUR"

Programming
- Format: College radio

Ownership
- Owner: Valparaiso University; (The Lutheran University Assoc., Inc.)

History
- First air date: September 25, 1966
- Call sign meaning: "Valparaiso University Radio"

Technical information
- Licensing authority: FCC
- Facility ID: 69776
- Class: D
- ERP: 36 watts
- HAAT: 38 meters (125 ft)
- Transmitter coordinates: 41°27′57″N 87°02′29″W

Links
- Public license information: Public file; LMS
- Website: wvurthesource.com

WVUR-FM, The Source 95 is the student-run college radio station of Valparaiso University in Valparaiso, Indiana. It broadcasts at 95.1 MHz FM and streams online at WVUR's website. The station features a range of students, staff, members of the public, and faculty members who contribute to the station. Each semester some students participate with The Source on a regular basis, making it one of the largest organizations on campus. The Source plays a wide variety of music including rock, alternative, jazz, punk, and indie. Many students have specialty shows in which they play their own mix in addition to the regular automated rotation. WVUR Sports is an integral part of the station. Hundreds of VU Athletics games are broadcast each year on the air and online. The Evening Source also exists, providing the area with news at five pm.

== Programming and promotion ==
The Source 95 is an entirely student-operated variety station. Its primary programming is music, which includes a standard rotation based on a combination of standard alternative fare and the CMJ Top 200/Indie/College Radio format, other genre-specific shows, and free-form shows during evenings and weekends. The station also includes talk with The Morning Show and news and weather with periodic updates throughout all programming, as well as The Evening Source news show. Programming also includes more than 100 sports broadcasts per year. WVUR Sports broadcasts Valparaiso University sporting events live on the air and on the WVUR online webcast.

=== Awards ===
The station won Indiana Association of Student Broadcasters awards in recent years, including Radio School of the Year in 2006, 2008, and 2010.

== History ==
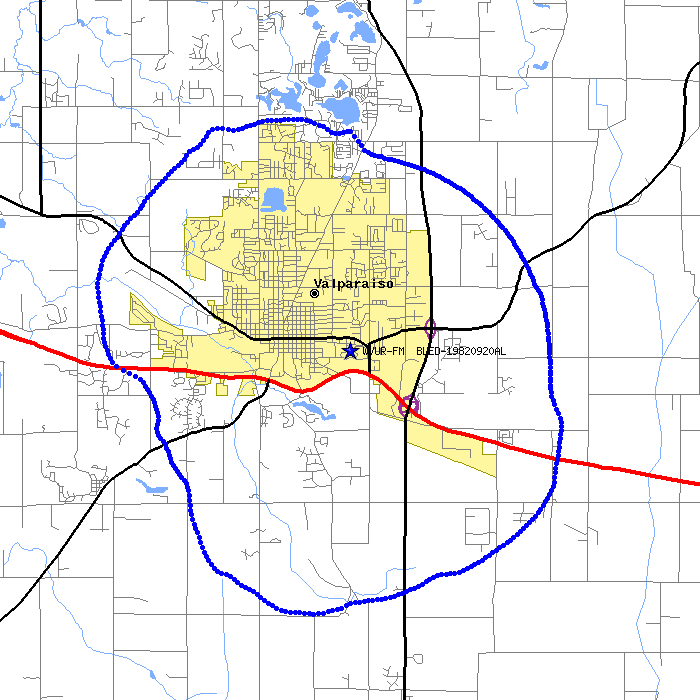
WVUR-FM Service Area Map

=== Development ===
In May 1949, a group of students submitted a proposal to the Valparaiso University Board of Directors to build an educational FM radio station in the basement of Guild Hall. However, after ten years without progress, VU law school student Jack Lawson led a committee to plan a radio station. With the help of DePauw University radio station WGRE, the committee obtained information necessary to found a radio station. After experimenting in November 1959 with a closed-circuit station nicknamed WPRX reaching only Wehrenberg Hall, President O. P. Kretzmann addressed the student body at 11 p.m. on November 11, 1960, on 600 AM. The low-power station broadcast out of Benton Hall and reached all but one dormitory. WVUR's first six years included transmission via telephone cables, and in 1966 WVUR became the first FM station in the city of Valparaiso, operating on frequency 89.5.

=== FM Radio ===
Permission was granted in February 1961 to construct a non-commercial educational FM station. Due to legal concerns, the station was turned over from the students to the administration. Though this move sparked heavy opposition, the transition began during the 1965–1966 academic year. On September 25, 1966, the FCC granted a license to WVUR-FM 89.5 MHz The Voice, making it the first radio station in the city of Valparaiso. The studio was still located in Benton Hall and included a new lounge nicknamed The Penthouse. The studios relocated to Heimlich Hall during the 1970–1971 academic year and moved again to the Journalism Center on January 11, 1978. On September 24, 1982, a new tower was constructed atop Brandt Hall, which brought increased wattage and the station's current frequency and name: WVUR 95.1 FM The Source.

=== Modernization ===
In August 1998, WVUR relocated to Schnabel Hall. In 1999, the station began web streaming sporting events. During the 2001–2002 academic year, the station upgraded to a computer automated system and commenced broadcasting 24 hours per day, 7 days per week, including during all academic breaks. The station also began taking requests by phone. In 2017 the station removed its on-air phone and thus stopped taking requests by phone.

In 2006, WVUR began posting podcasts, media from concerts, and assorted other media such as station-made remixes on its website. On January 16, 2007, the station added a modern rock/alternative format to complement the current CMJ Indie rotation. Fall Out Boy's This Ain't a Scene, It's an Arms Race was the first official song to play in the new format.

In 2012, WVUR started to stream its full broadcast online 24/7, expanding the sports-only stream to include music, talk, and all other programming. The Source officially began full streaming at 9:51 a.m. on May 2, 2012. The first song officially played both on the air and online in this new era was Foster The People's Don't Stop (Color on the Walls).

In 2015, new general manager Andrew Whitmyer found the format insufficient for the station's needs and switched to a full mix station. In 2020, sports director Garrett Willis took up the project to get WVUR a new TieLine system for broadcasting Beacon athletics. The new system is the first that is owned by the university station.

New General Manager Zach Collins put WVUR under a partial renovation in 2021. This included updating equipment, reorganizing materials, and renovating the common area space and allocating different offices to new departments at the station. This also included an updated software update to the 24/7 playlist and reorganization of the sports department following the new TieLine equipment back in 2020. WVUR also has their first official app that can be downloaded on any Apple device from a Safari browser and can access TuneIn, give station updates, and allow students to join the station by the click of a button. The app can be found at the link here. www.jotform.com/app/220437252570147/

== Alumni ==
- Adam Amin, ESPN and national radio (sportscaster)
- Ginger Zee ('02) ABC News Network/Good Morning America, New York, New York (Meteorologist)

== See also ==
- Campus radio
- List of college radio stations in the United States
