= Albert Huegli =

15th President of Valparaiso University
- In office 1968–1978
- Preceded by: O. P. Kretzmann
- Succeeded by: Robert V. Schnabel

Personal details
- Born: 1913 Detroit, Michigan, United States
- Died: 18 October 1998 (aged 84–85) Rochester Hills, Michigan, United States
- Spouse: Frances
- Children: 4 (including 3 stepchildren)

Albert George Huegli was an American professor and academic administrator who served as the 15th President of Valparaiso University from 1968 to 1978. He previously held the position as the university's vice president for Academic Affairs from 1961 to 1968.

== Biography ==
Albert George Huegli was born in 1913 in Detroit, Michigan. He was the grandson of Johannes Adam Huegli, who personally encouraged future 12th President of Valparaiso University, W. H. T. Dau, to enter the Lutheran ministry.

He received his PhD in philosophy from Northwestern University. He served 21 years at Concordia University, River Forest as a professor of history and political science, and also served as an academic dean of the university.

In 1961, Huegli joined Valparaiso University as vice president of academic affairs from 1961 to 1968, and then later became president of the university, which he served from 1968 to 1978. During this time, 18 buildings on the campus were renovated.

After retirement, he served six years as a visiting scholar at the University of Michigan.

== Legacy ==
In Valparaiso, Indiana, Valparaiso University's Huegli Hall, which houses offices for faculty in the College of Arts and Sciences, is named in Huegli's honor.

== Bibliography ==
- Church And State Under God (3 October 1997)

Academic offices
Preceded by O. P. Kretzmann	16th President of Valparaiso University; 1968-1978	Succeeded by Robert V. Schnabel
