= Alan Harre =

American academic administrator (1940–2020)

17th President of Valparaiso University
- In office 1988–2008
- Preceded by: Robert V. Schnabel
- Succeeded by: Mark A. Heckler

6th President of Concordia University, St. Paul
- In office 1984–1988
- Preceded by: Gerhardt W. Hyatt
- Succeeded by: John F. Johnson

Acting President of Concordia University, Nebraska
- In office ? – 1983 or 1984

Personal details
- Born: June 12, 1940 Nashville, Illinois, United States
- Died: August 20, 2020 (aged 80) Seward, Nebraska, United States
- Spouse: Diane Mack
- Children: 3
- Occupations: pastor, professor, university administrator and president

Academic background
- Education: Concordia Senior College, Concordia Seminary, Presbyterian School of Christian Education
- Alma mater: Wayne State University (PhD)
- Thesis: Need to Achieve and Commitment as Factors in the Withdrawal of Males from the Lutheran Teaching Ministry (1976)

Alan F. Harre (1940–2020) was the seventeenth president of Valparaiso University, a post he held for 20 years from 1988 to 2008. He was succeeded by Elizabethtown College alumnus, Mark A. Heckler. Harre was designated President Emeritus of Valparaiso University on July 1, 2008, and was voted one of Valparaiso University's 150 most influential people in history by 2009. He was also the sixth president of Concordia University, St. Paul, from 1984 to 1988.

== Early life and education ==
Alan Frederick Harre was born on June 12, 1940, in Nashville, Illinois, to Adolph and Hilda Harre. He attended St. Paul's College in Concordia, Missouri and graduated in 1960. He received his bachelor's of arts degree in 1962 from Concordia College in Fort Wayne, Indiana. He received his master of divinity degree in 1966 from Concordia Seminary in Clayton, Missouri. In 1967, he received a master's of arts degree from the Presbyterian School of Christian Education in Richmond, Virginia. He then attended Wayne State University.

== Works ==
=== Thesis ===
- Harre, Alan F. (1976). Need to Achieve and Commitment as Factors in the Withdrawal of Males from the Lutheran Teaching Ministry (PhD). Wayne State University. OCLC 3509638.

=== Books ===
- Harre, Alan F. (1984). Close the Back Door: ways to create a caring congregational fellowship. Speaking the Gospel Series. St. Louis, MO: Concordia Publishing House. ISBN 978-0-570-03932-7. OCLC 10348718.

Academic offices
Preceded by Robert V. Schnabel	18th President of Valparaiso University; 1988–2008	Succeeded by Mark A. Heckler
