= Cade (disambiguation) =

Cade is a given name and a surname. It may also refer to:

== CADE ==
- Administrative Council for Economic Defense, a Brazilian antitrust regulator commonly known by its Portuguese acronym CADE
- CADE Ejecutivos or CADE, an annual event for Peruvian business leaders, politicians and academics
- Conference on Automated Deduction, an academic conference beginning in 1974
- Customer Account Data Engine, the name of two American Internal Revenue Service tax databases

== Other uses ==
- Cade (horse) (1734–1756), British racehorse, an important foundation sire of Thoroughbred racehorses
- Cade Museum for Creativity and Invention, Gainesville, Florida, United States
- Cade, Oklahoma, United States, an unincorporated community
- Juniperus oxycedrus, also called Cade, a species of juniper
- Cade, a trilogy by science fiction author Douglas Hill

== See also ==
- Kade (disambiguation)
