= Kade-Duesenberg German House and Cultural Center =

Coordinates: 41°27′42″N 87°3′0″W

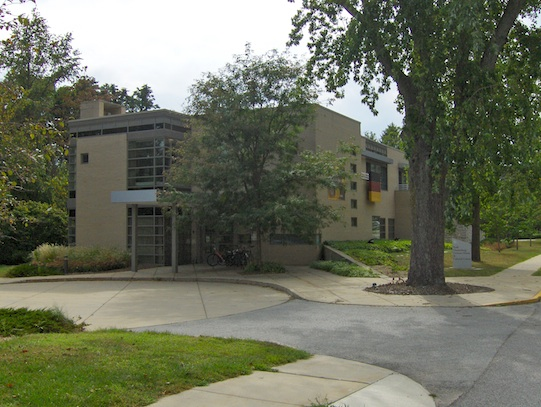
The Kade-Duesenberg German House and Cultural Center located at 822 Mound Street in Valparaiso, IN

The Kade-Duesenberg German House and Cultural Center is a residential and academic building on the campus of Valparaiso University in Valparaiso, Indiana.

== Description ==
On the upper floor of the building, up to twelve students studying German live with a native-speaker Resident Assistant. They cook together five nights a week and pledge to speak German when in the shared areas of the house. On the lower floor of the building, there are two classrooms and other programming spaces for class meetings, film screenings, workshops, a weekly coffee hour, and a Kinder lernen Deutsch class for elementary children. There are occasional exhibitions on German history, literature, and art.

== History ==
The German House and Cultural Center was constructed in 1999/2000. The $3.2 million project was funded by the Max Kade Foundation and alumni benefactors Richard and Phyllis Duesenberg and Robert and Lori Duesenberg. The two-story, 10,200-square-foot (950 m^{2}) building was designed by Design Organization in the style of the German Bauhaus movement of the 1920s. It was distinguished with Northwest Indiana's 2001 "Commercial Project of the Year" award, as well as the 2001 Community Improvement Award presented by the Greater Valparaiso Chamber of Commerce and the Porter County Builders Association, Inc.

A traditional German ceremony, the Richtfest, marked the "topping out" or completion of the framework of the Kade-Duesenberg German House and Cultural Center on December 6, 1999. The ceremony included remarks by benefactors and by the president of the campus German Club, Janice Mulholland. Members of the Valparaiso University Brass Ensemble, conducted by Richard Watson, and the Gjallar Quartet provided music; and the newly appointed cultural center director, Dr. Sarah DeMaris, gave a toast in German to the workers, to the donors, and to all who would use the building. The highlight of the Richtfest was the traditional raising of a ribbon-festooned evergreen at the highest point on the building.

The German House and Cultural Center was dedicated on September 23, 2000 at a ceremony attended by Jürgen Chrobog, German ambassador; Hans-Ulrich Seidt, head of the German Cultural Affairs Department; and major donors Richard and Phyllis Duesenberg, Robert and Lori Duesenberg, Karl and Shirley Kreft, and Henry and June Giebel. The dedication was preceded by a procession of Valparaiso University faculty in academic garb from the University's Chapel of the Resurrection to the new building. The dedication was held concurrently with a celebration of the university's 75th year of affiliation with the Lutheran University Association. Senator Paul Simon, a long-time supporter of foreign language education, was the keynote speaker.

The Kade-Duesenberg German House and Cultural Center celebrated its 10-year anniversary in 2010. After serving for 10 years as the Director of Kade-Duesenberg German House, Dr. Sarah DeMaris retired from her administrative duties. Dr. Jennifer Bjornstad currently serves as the Director.
