= Concordia Senior College =

College in Fort Wayne, Indiana, US

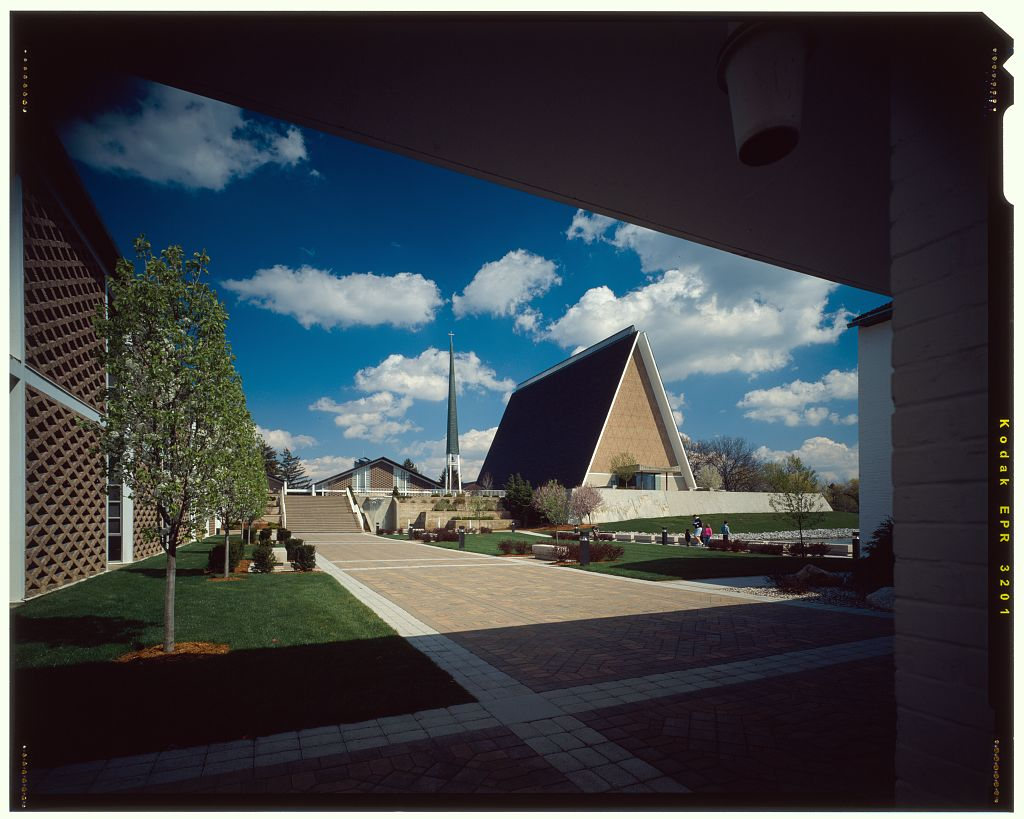
- Active: 1957–1977
- Religious affiliation: Lutheran Church–Missouri Synod
- Location: Fort Wayne, Indiana, United States; 41°8′21.6″N 85°6′32.8″W
- Campus: Suburban

Concordia Senior College was a liberal arts college located in Fort Wayne, Indiana, and affiliated with the Lutheran Church – Missouri Synod (LCMS). It was founded in 1957 and closed in 1977.

The senior college was a new type of institution for the LCMS. It provided future pastors with training before they attended a seminary, during their third and fourth undergraduate years of college. Concordia Senior College was by-and-large an all-men's institution with no female faculty, although there were a small number of female students who were housed in a separate dormitory.

In 1977, the function of Concordia Senior College was transferred to other LCMS colleges, the Concordia University System. Today those colleges are responsible for much of the undergraduate training of future LCMS pastors. The campus became the home of the Concordia Theological Seminary as that institution relocated from Springfield, Illinois.

== Architecture ==
Concordia's Fort Wayne campus was designed by acclaimed Finnish-American architect Eero Saarinen and his associates between 1953 and 1958. It occupies 191 acres (77 ha) along the banks of the St. Joseph River and was made up of around 40 buildings.

Saarinen centered the campus around a plaza defined by an A-frame chapel. Surrounding that were three ranges of dormitories, radiating outwards. Most buildings featured 23.5 degree roof pitches as part of Saarinen's attempt to make the campus reminiscent of a northern European village.

The campus was built with brick as a primary material, along with a Saarinen-designed Concordia roof tile manufactured by the Ludowici-Celadon Company.

== Athletics ==
The Concordia Senior College's athletic teams were called the Saxons (named for the Lutheran immigrants from Saxony to Missouri in the late 1830s who then helped form the LCMS). The college was a member of the National Association of Intercollegiate Athletics (NAIA), primarily competing in the Mid-Central College Conference (MCCC; now currently known as the Crossroads League since the 2012–13 school year) from 1959–60 to 1971–72, and then as an independent until the school's closure.

== Notable people ==
- David Benke – Lutheran pastor and the former president of the Atlantic District of the LCMS
- Clifford Flanigan – American professor of English, medievalist, and theatre historian
- Alan Harre – eighteenth president of Valparaiso University
- Joel D. Heck – professor of theology at Concordia University Texas
- Ralph W. Klein – American Old Testament scholar
- Robert Kolb – professor emeritus of Systematic Theology at Concordia Seminary,
- James F. Laatsch – former member of the Wisconsin State Assembly
- Donald K. Muchow – former rear admiral and Chief of Chaplains of the United States Navy
- Richard Pervo – American biblical scholar
- Norbert Schedler – faculty member (associate professor, 1963–1967; chair of the Department of Philosophy, 1968–1969)
- Paul W. Schroeder – American historian
- Ronald Frank Thiemann – American political theologian
