= Clifford Flanigan =

American historian

Clifford Flanigan (August 2, 1941 – October 27, 1993) was an American professor of English, medievalist, and theatre historian.

== Life and career ==
Charles Clifford Flanigan grew up as an only child in Baltimore, Maryland, in a family descended from German and Irish immigrants. He graduated from Baltimore City College a year early, at the age of 16. Seeking to become a Lutheran pastor, he began theological studies at Concordia College in Bronxville, New York and then continued them at Concordia Senior College in Fort Wayne, Indiana. His master's degree was granted by Concordia Seminary near St. Louis, Missouri, in 1967. Although a Protestant, Flanigan followed the Catholic liturgical year with interest and observed many saints' days and feasts in a private manner and also by visiting Catholic churches.

He began studying Comparative Literature and Medieval history at Washington University in St. Louis while still at seminary. After deciding against entering the ministry, he enrolled full-time in doctoral studies at Washington University. When, in 1973, he completed his dissertation on the origins of liturgical drama, he was already employed as a junior professor at Indiana University Bloomington's program in Comparative Literature. An article, excerpted from his dissertation, received a prize from the Medieval Academy of America in 1976.

Flanigan was a gifted teacher. After his unexpected and early death, his students and colleagues organized two symposia in his honor, 1994 in Bloomington and 1995 in Kalamazoo. Flanigan's research was considered by many medievalist colleagues of the time to be unconventional and progressive, because he applied ideas from recent Critical Theory to medieval topics.

As a dramaturg, director, and actor, Flanigan was devoted to staging medieval dramas, for instance the Passion Play from the Carmina Burana, which was performed in Bloomington and New York City. He collaborated on a total of nine such performances.

== Selected books written or edited by Flanigan ==
- The Fleury "Playbook". Essays and Studies, ed. C. Clifford Flanigan, Thomas P. Campbell, Clifford Davidson (Kalamazoo 1985).
- Liturgical Drama and Dramatic Liturgy. A Study of the Quem queritis Easter Dialogue and its Cultic Context (Ann Arbor [Michigan] 1981).

== Literature about Flanigan ==
- Claus Clüver, In Memoriam C. Clifford Flanigan, 2 August 1941 – 27 October 1993, in: Papers by and for C. Clifford Flanigan: The Ritual Life of Medieval Europe, ed. Robert L.A. Clark. Romard 52–53 (2014), p. 23–26, esp. p. 23–25.
- Liturgy and the Arts in the Middle Ages. Studies in Honour of C. Clifford Flanigan, ed. Eva Louise Lillie–Nils Holger Petersen (Copenhagen 1996).
