= Concordia College (New York) =

Private college in Bronxville, New York (1881–2021)

Concordia College New York
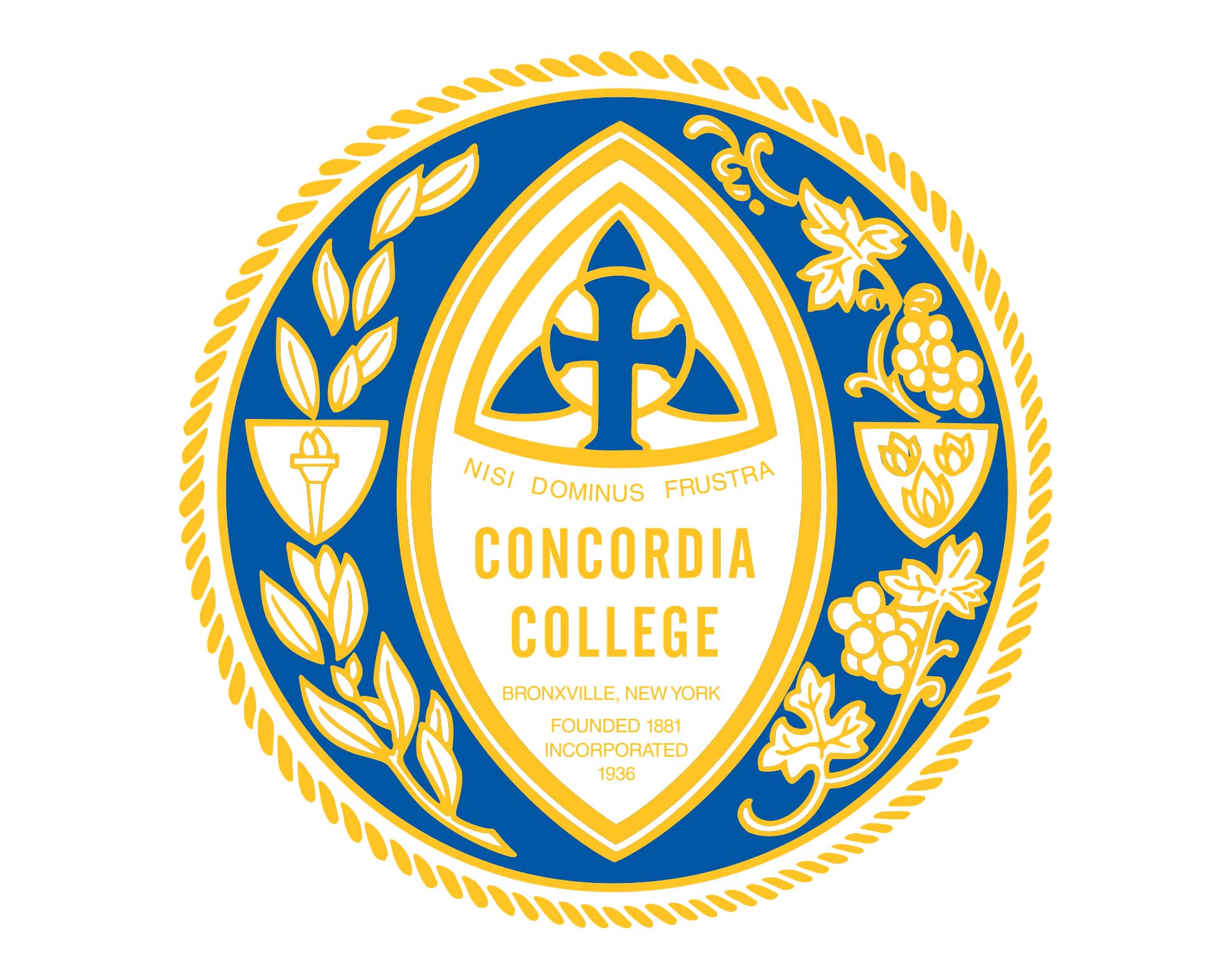
- Seal of Concordia College
- Type: Private college
- Active: 1881–2021
- Parent institution: Concordia University System
- Religious affiliation: Lutheran Church–Missouri Synod
- Endowment: 14 million (2020)
- President: John Arthur Nunes
- Provost: Rachel Eells
- Academic staff: 50
- Students: 1,597
- Undergraduates: 1,129
- Postgraduates: 468
- Location: Bronxville, New York, US; 40.943°N 73.8215°W
- Campus: Suburban 33 acres (main campus)
- Colors: Gold and Blue
- Nickname: Clippers
- Sporting affiliations: NCAA Division II and Central Atlantic Collegiate Conference
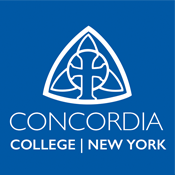

Concordia College (CCNY) was a private college in Bronxville, New York, United States. It was sponsored by the Lutheran Church–Missouri Synod (LCMS) and was a member of the Concordia University System. It was chartered by the Board of Regents of the University of the State of New York to offer associate, bachelor, and master's degrees.

Concordia, founded in 1881 as Concordia Progymnasium, received its original charter from the State Regents in 1936. From 1918 to 1969, it was named Concordia Collegiate Institute; in 1969, the preparatory school was closed and the present name of the college was authorized by a charter change. In 1972, the State Regents authorized the college to grant the baccalaureate degree. In 2011, the State Regents authorized the college to grant the master's degree.

On January 28, 2021, Concordia announced that it would cease offering classes as of the Fall 2021 semester and that Iona College would purchase the Bronxville campus and provide a "teach-out" for current students. A parade of graduates was held on May 8, 2021, to mark the final May commencement. Classes ceased being offered by the college in August 2021, with a final conferral of degrees in December 2021.

== History ==
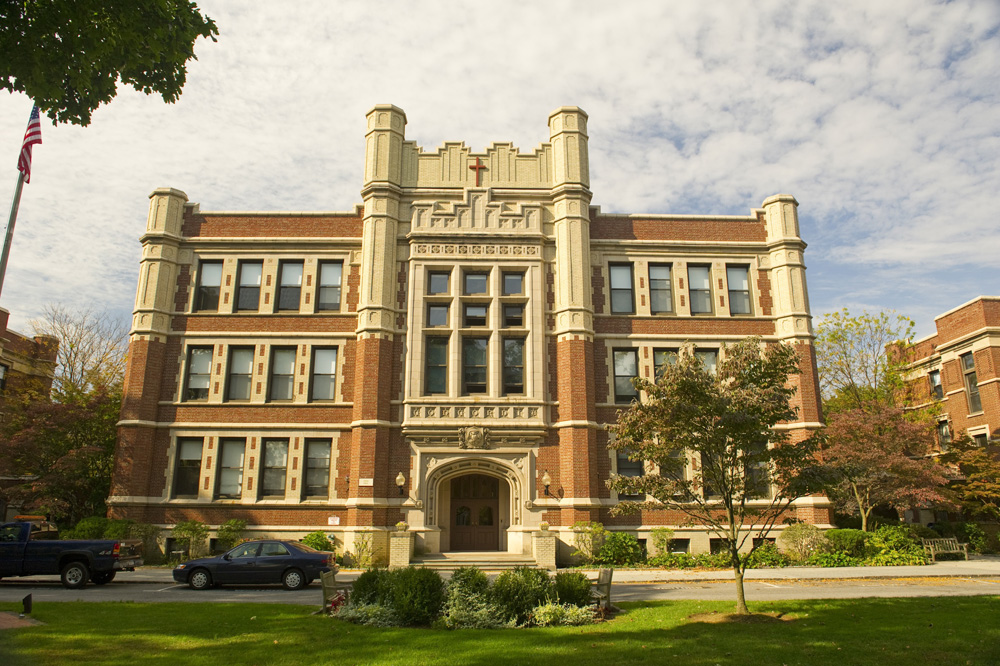
Feth Main Building

Concordia College was founded in 1881 in Manhattan as a part of the Lutheran Church of St. Matthew in Manhattan. It was established as a feeder school for Concordia Seminary in St. Louis, Missouri. Edmund Bohm and J.H. Sieker (director and pastor, respectively, of the Lutheran Church of St. Matthew) established a Sexta and a Quinta (the equivalent to the first two years of high school) at St. Mathew Academy and thereby in effect began a Progymnasium.

Concordia soon outgrew its modest beginning, and by February 1893, land had been purchased in Unionville, New York (now Hawthorne) for $9,000 donated by M. S. Becker. A sub-committee was elected to locate land outside of New York City. Pastor Edmund Bohm, William Dick, and Henry Fischer took a train to the Unionville Station in Westchester County. Property was selected based on the persuasiveness of a real estate agent and a local farmer who claimed that oats, corn, vegetables, and hay could be harvested from the land and that the property contained enough stones to build a foundation.

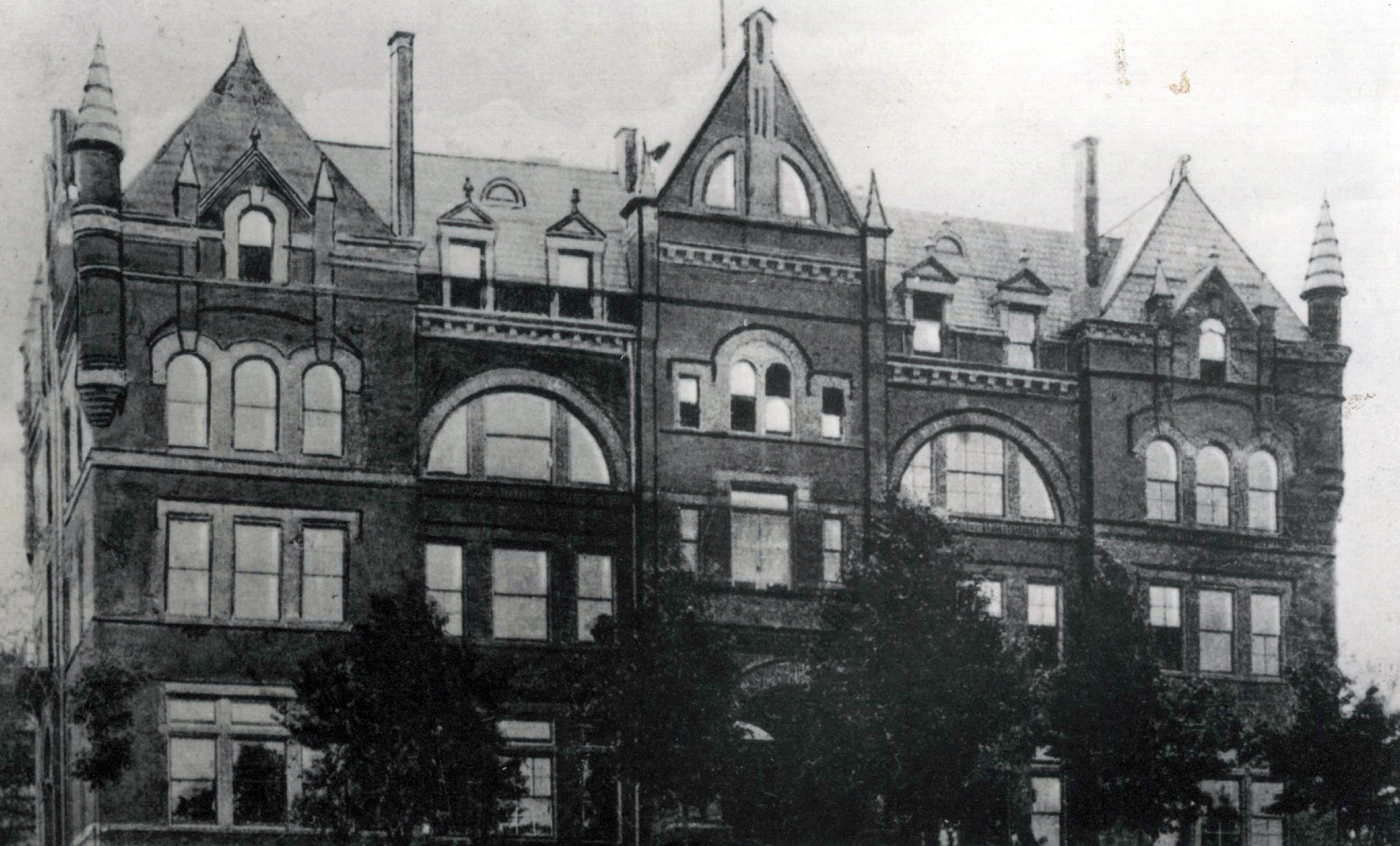
CCNY Hawthorne Building

After great consideration (and myriad maintenance issues) the college was moved once again to its current home in Bronxville. Fourteen acres (5.7 ha) were bought for $52,383 on April 23, 1908. The Bronxville property, like the Hawthorne campus, was chosen for its close proximity to Manhattan and for its bucolic backdrop. Three buildings—Feth Hall, Bohm Hall, and the Commons—were designed by Edward Lippincott Tilton and constructed in eight months for $160,000, which included furnishings and landscaping. On January 4, 1910, the Bronxville campus opened with a student body of 100 young men.

On June 28, 2019, the Middle States Commission on Higher Education placed Concordia's accreditation on probation due to issues of assessment and financial stability. Despite efforts to improve its finances, Concordia announced on January 28, 2021, that it would cease classes starting with the Fall 2021 semester. The announcement noted that the COVID-19 pandemic had accelerated the decline in the college's financial position.

The Roman Catholic Iona College in nearby New Rochelle reached an agreement with Concordia in May 2021 to purchase Concordia's Bronxville campus and provide a 'teach-out' for Concordia's current students. The former Concordia Campus was subsequently used to house the NewYork-Presbyterian Iona School of Health Sciences, established after a $20 million gift from NewYork-Presbyterian.

== Scheele Memorial Library ==
The Scheele Memorial Library was dedicated on June 9, 1974, and honors the parents of Joan Scheele Mueller. Her father (business executive William Scheele) and mother were longtime members of Immanuel Lutheran Church in Brooklyn, New York.

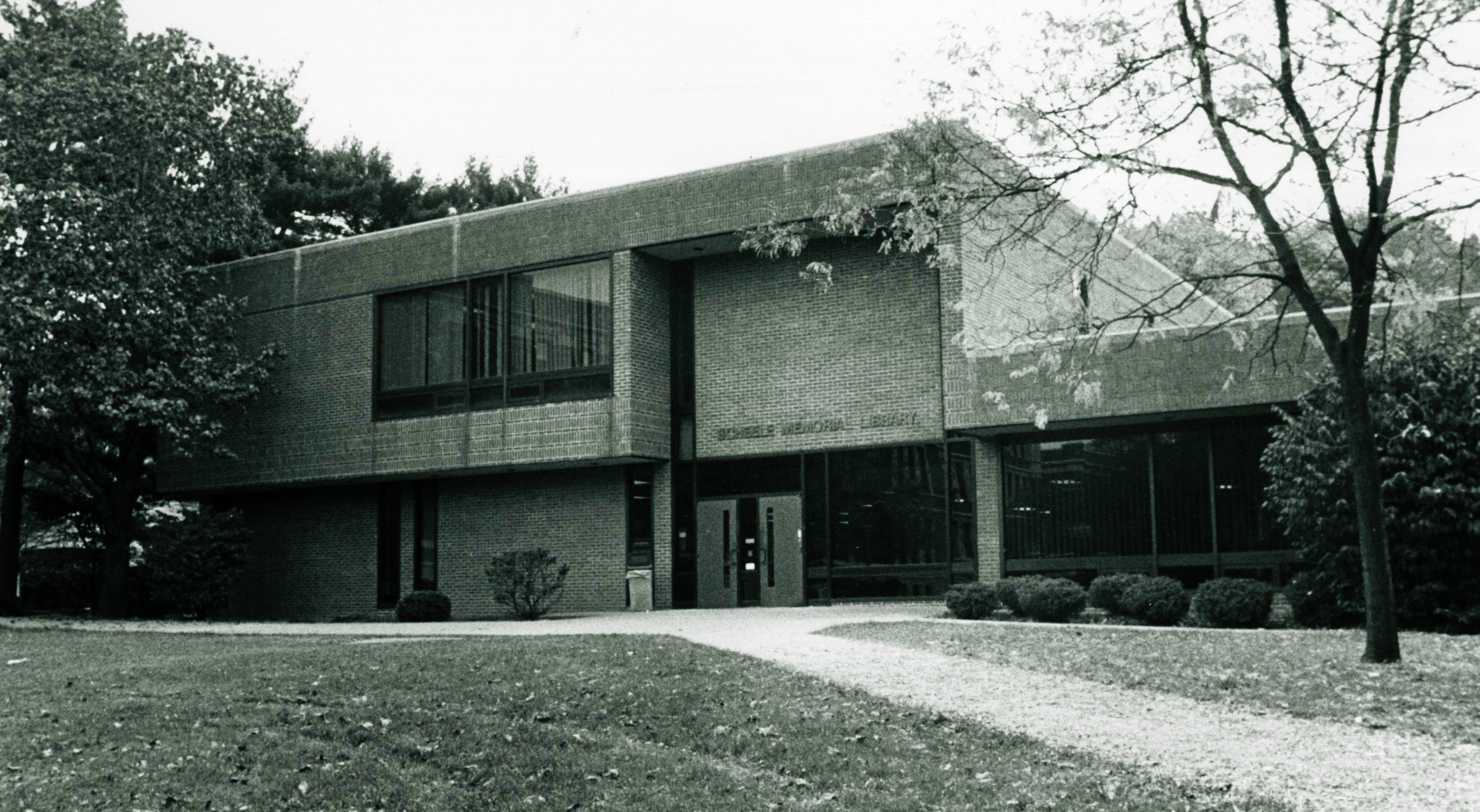
Scheele Library 1974

The Concordia College Archives preserves historical records of the college. The archives document the college, beginning at its first location in Manhattan, the move to Hawthorne, as well as the purchase of the present site and all its additions in Bronxville. The collection includes documents, office files, scrapbooks, newspaper clippings, photographs, college publications, musical recordings, audio visual materials and artifacts.

== Academics ==
Concordia offered the Bachelor of Arts (B.A.) and Bachelor of Science (B.S.) degrees. The college also offered (on campus and online) the Master of Science in Childhood Special Education, Early Childhood Special Education, Business Leadership, a post-baccalaureate Nursing program, an R.N. to B.S. program, and accelerated associate and bachelor's degree completion programs for adults.

=== Nursing program ===
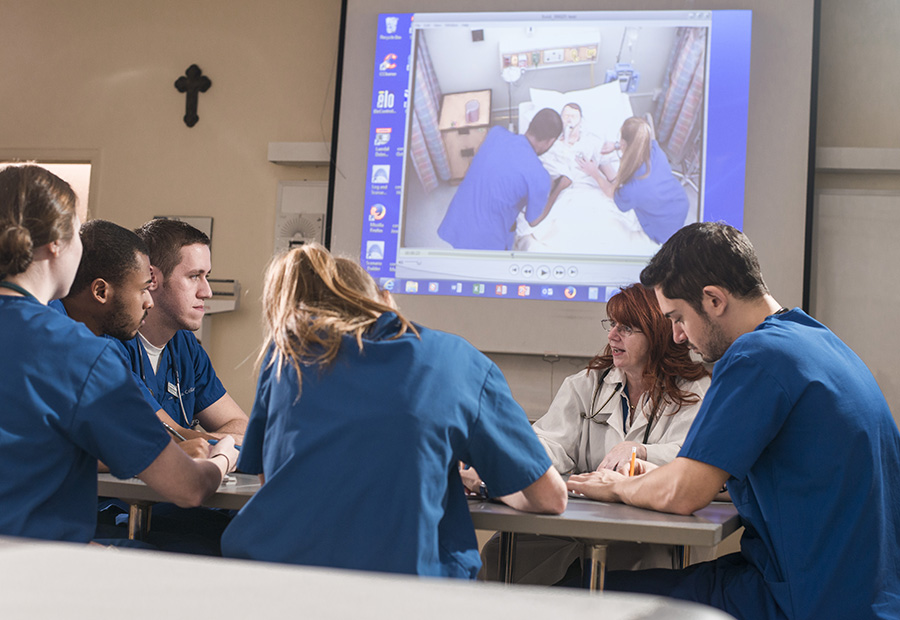
Nursing Students

Concordia College offered three nursing programs: the Traditional Undergraduate program, the Post-Baccalaureate program, and a RN to BS program.

The Traditional Undergraduate program was designed for first-year and transfer students and provided courses for traditional undergraduate students who seek a Bachelor of Science degree. The Post-Baccalaureate program was an accelerated, 15-month Bachelor of Science program for students with a bachelor's degree in another field. The RN to BS program was designed for Registered Nurses who seek a bachelor's degree to advance their careers.

In 2018, Concordia College's nursing students had an 94.8% pass rate for first-time RN NCLEX test-takers.

== Students and faculty ==
Concordia's students came from 23 states and more than 37 countries worldwide. The student-to-professor ratio was 13 to 1. Total enrollment was 1,037 students before of its closing in 2021. 93% of the college's students received some form of financial aid, whether grants or loans, and approximately 60% of Concordia's students lived on campus.

=== Student organizations ===
Concordia College's clubs and organizations were formed by students with common interests and objectives. The clubs and organizations that existed at Concordia are listed below.

Student Government: Executive Board, Student Senate, Inter-Greek Council; Committees on Issues and Voting, and Outreach

Publications: The Arcade (yearbook), The Prelude (Fellow's journal), and The Clippings (electronic newspaper)

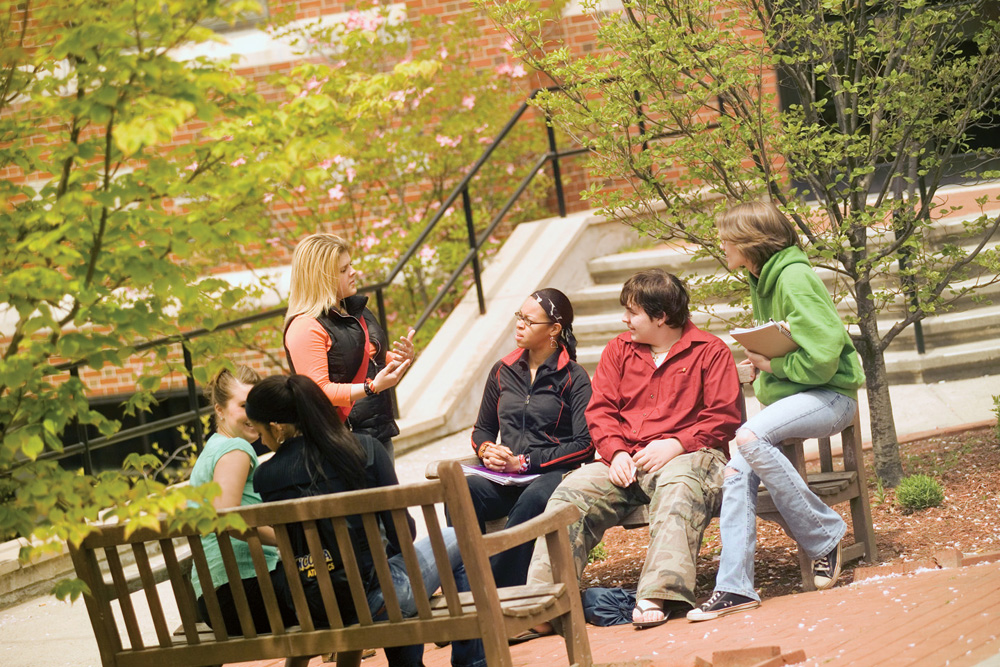
Concordia College Student Life Campus

Culture/Fine Arts: Concordia Players, Tour Choir, Festival Choir, Gospel Choir, Chapel Choir, Chamber Ensembles, International, Jazz Ensembles, Music and Talent Club, Multicultural Club, and Praise Dance Team, and Spanish Dance Club Service/Spiritual Clubs: Alpha Sigma Chi, Delta Omega Pi, Theta Zeta Upsilon, Omega Psi Eta, Business Club, Education Club, Social Work Club, Praise Dance Team, Christian Campus Ministries

Social/Recreational: Commuter Council, International Club, Student Activities Committee, Cheerleading, and Intramurals

Academic Clubs: Biology Club, Psychology Club, Pre-Law Club, Alpha Mu Gamma Foreign Language Honor Society, Alpha Sigma Lambda Adult Education Honor Society, Kappa Delta Pi Honor Society, Nursing National Honor Society, and the National Student Nursing Association

== Athletics ==
At the time of the school's closing, Concordia–New York (CCNY) athletic teams were the Clippers. The college was a long-time competitor in the Division II level of the National Collegiate Athletic Association (NCAA), primarily competing as a member of the Central Atlantic Collegiate Conference (CACC) from 2009–10 to 2020–21. The Clippers previously competed in the East Coast Conference (ECC; originally known as the New York Collegiate Athletic Conference (NYCAC) until after the 2005–06 academic year) from 1989–90 to 2008–09.

Concordia–New York (CCNY) sponsored 12 varsity intercollegiate teams as of the 2018–19 school year: Men's sports included baseball, basketball, cross country, golf, soccer and tennis; women's sports included basketball, cross country, soccer, softball, tennis and volleyball.

=== Facilities ===
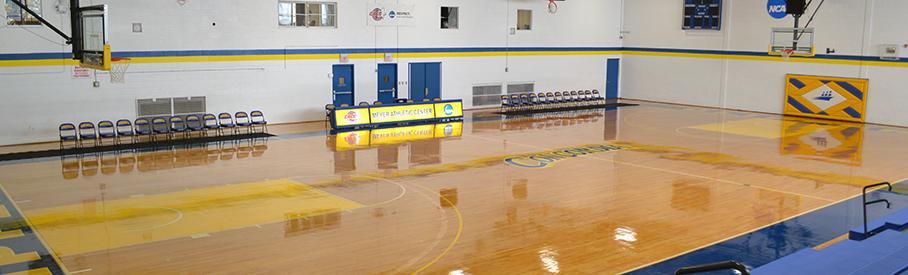
Meyer Athletic Center

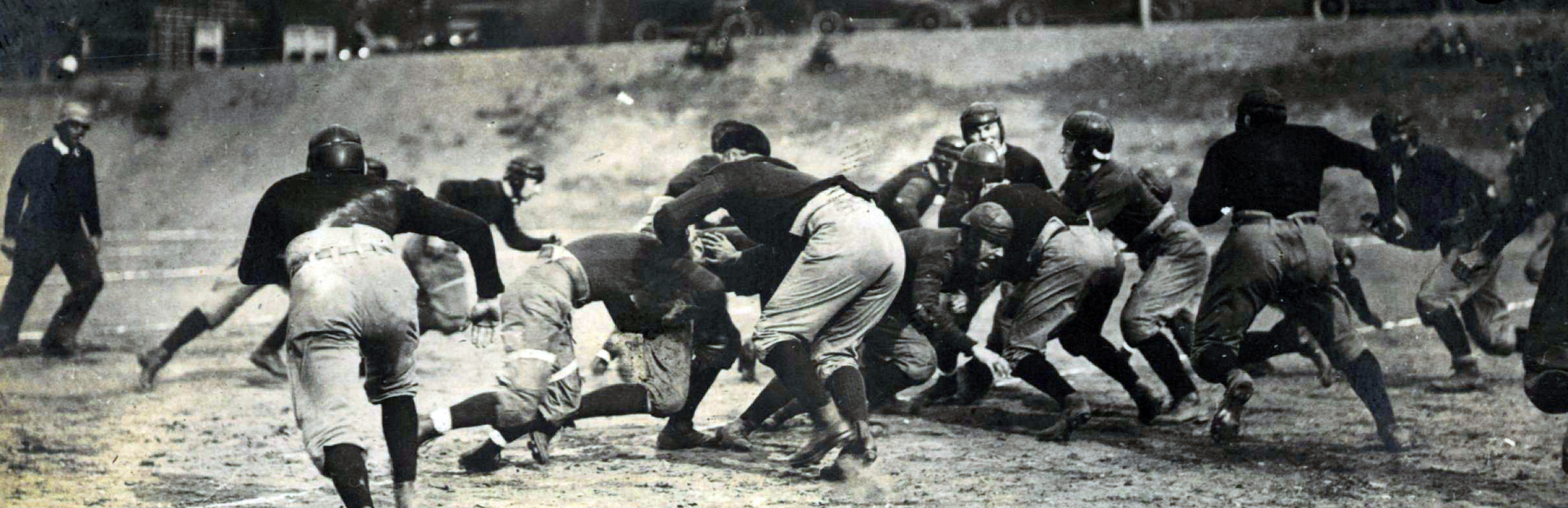
CCNY - 1900s Football

The Meyer Athletic Center's 700-seat gymnasium was home to the Concordia College men's and women's basketball teams and volleyball team. It also housed the Department of Athletics offices, as well as the athletic training room, locker rooms for both men and women, and a fitness center. Also in the complex were the Clipper Baseball Field, Clipper Softball Field, and the Clipper Soccer Field.

== Concordia Conservatory ==
Concordia Conservatory was a center for music education in Westchester County. The Conservatory attempts to integrate music into the cultural life of the lower Westchester community. In addition to grassroots programs in schools, libraries, assisted living, and day care centers, the Conservatory offers performances. More than 150 performances are given each year including: Music-on-Parade for Scholarship, the Hoch Chamber Music Series, the Chamber Music Festival, and faculty concerts.

Despite the college closing, Concordia Conservatory continued as an independent organization, though moving to nearby Stamford, Connecticut.

== Donald A. Krenz Academic Center ==
The 12,000-square-foot (1,100 m^{2}) Krenz Center addition to the Scheele Memorial Library's second floor, completed in August 2006, contained classrooms, including the 82-seat Pietruski Auditorium, a 20-station computer teaching room, the Darlene Hedin Krenz Center for New Media and Digital Production, The Yeager Collection, and the OSilas Art Gallery. It was named after Donald Krenz who was chairman of Concordia College's 13-member Board of Regents, a New York City lawyer, and businessman.

The center was selected for the 2009 American School and University Magazine Education Interiors Showcase. The project was chosen "for its ability to integrate current and future technology, innovative use of materials, life-cycle cost versus first cost, timelessness, safety and security, clarity of design concept, and accommodation of an enhanced educational mission."

The Yeager Collection is a collection of autographs of American businessmen, financiers, and wealth creators. It is underwritten by George and Barbara Yeager.

The OSilas Gallery (underwritten by Si and Vicki Ford) opened on September 14, 2006. The gallery provided exhibitions, lectures, workshops, and art tours featuring a variety of art genres and styles, such as historic, contemporary, and new media. Many of these events were integrated with art and other academic programs at the college; an exhibition of Concordia student art was held annually.

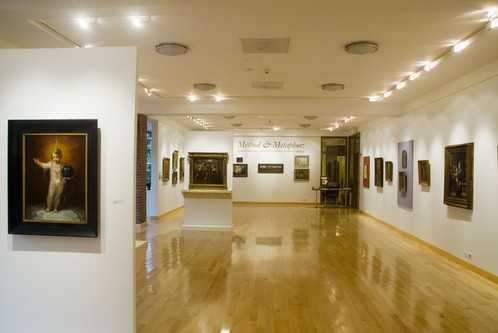
OSilas Gallery

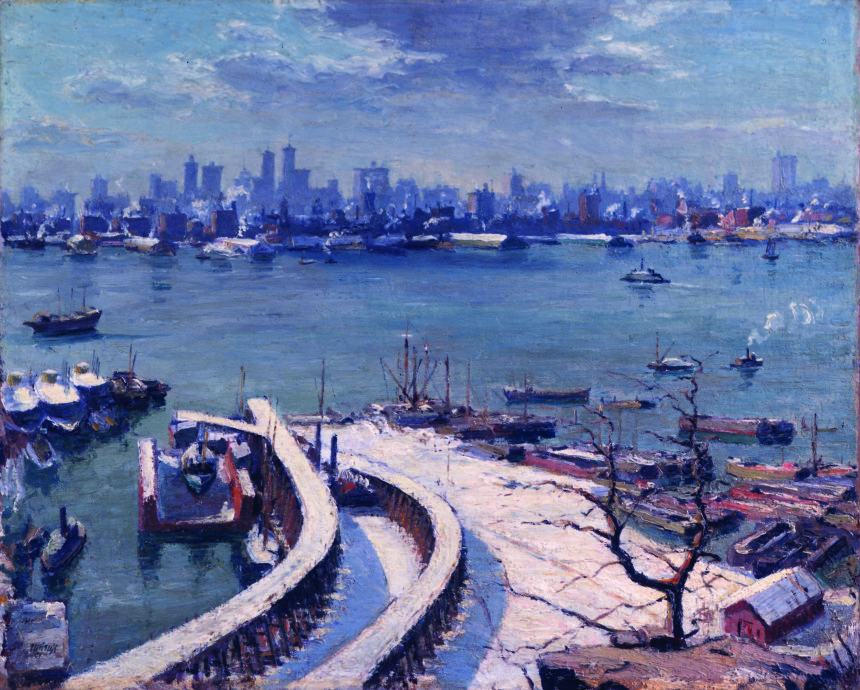
THE DAVIES COLLECTION

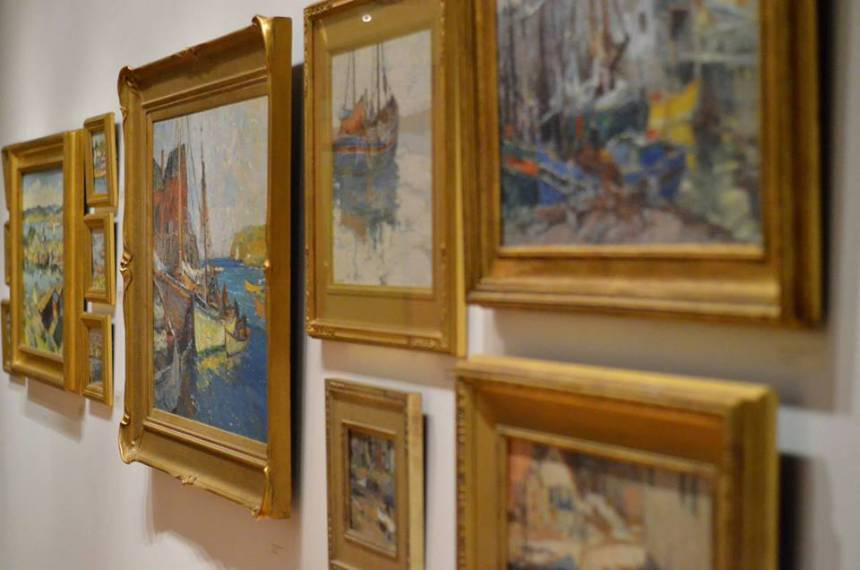
OSilas Gallery Paintings

== Schoenfeld Building ==
In 1926, the college's Board of Control unsuccessfully petitioned the LCMS to build a campus gym. Subsequently, the Schoenfeld Memorial Campaign committee was formed and set out to raise $100,000 for construction costs. The Schoenfeld Gymnasium was ultimately erected by the efforts of both the church congregation and The Lutheran Education Society. The gym opened on October 1, 1928. The final cost for the construction project was $140,000. The gymnasium was originally designed by American architect: James Gamble Rogers.

The gym was dedicated to William F. Schoenfeld, "one of the foremost Lutheran ministers in New York". Among many accomplishments associated with the Lutheran Church, Schoenfeld was pastor for 21 years of the Immanuel Church in Manhattan and one of the founders of the Lutheran Education Society. He "died suddenly July 30 [1919], on Buck Mountain, near Lake George, N.Y".

In 1994, three million dollars was raised to convert the Schoenfeld building into a drama facility and center for student life. On September 30, 1995, the building was re-opened to the college community.

On October 30, 2015, the new Schoenfeld Campus Center opened. The new modifications included a food court, expanded seating area, an enhanced game room, a redesigned campus store, new study lounges, and a redesigned garden in the outdoor courtyard.

== Accreditation ==
Concordia College was accredited by the Middle States Commission on Higher Education.

The Social Work program was accredited by the Commission on Accreditation of the Council on Social Work Education (CSWE).

The Teacher Education Program at Concordia College-New York was accredited by the Council for the Accreditation of Education Preparation (CAEP).

The Nursing Program was accredited by the Commission on Collegiate Nursing Education (CCNE).

The Business Program was a candidate for accreditation by the International Assembly for Collegiate Business Education (IACBE).

The college was registered by the New York State Education Department and the college's International Center for English as a Second Language was a member of the American Association of Intensive English Programs.

== Notable alumni ==
- Dell Alston, professional baseball player
- Mike Avilés, professional baseball player
- John Doherty, professional baseball player
- Clifford Flanigan, professor of English, medievalist, and theatre history scholar
- Willie Fraser, professional baseball player
- O. P. Kretzmann, Lutheran pastor, professor, author, and long-tenured president of Valparaiso University
- Scott Leius, professional baseball player
- Walter A. Maier, Lutheran broadcaster and professor who served as the first speaker of The Lutheran Hour and as professor at Concordia Seminary
- Robert H. Smith, New Testament theologian who served as professor at Concordia Seminary, Seminex, and Pacific Lutheran Theological Seminary
- John Tietjen, Lutheran leader who served as president of Concordia Seminary and Seminex

== See also ==
- List of defunct colleges and universities in New York
