= Kade Munday =

Australian cricketer (born 1983)

Personal information
- Full name: Kade Michael Munday
- Born: 4 January 1983 (age 43); Burnie, Tasmania, Australia
- Batting: Right-handed
- Bowling: Right-arm medium

Domestic team information
- Years: Team
- 2000/01: Tasmania
- Only List A: 21 January 2001 Tasmania v South Australia

Career statistics
Competition	List A
Matches	1
Runs scored	1
Batting average	1.00
100s/50s	0/0
Top score	1
Catches/stumpings	0/– date = 15 August
- Source: CricketArchive, 2010

Kade Michael Munday (born 4 January 1983) is an Australian cricketer who has played for Tasmania and an Australian rules footballer who played for the Tasmanian Football League club Burnie Dockers.

Born in Burnie, Tasmania, Munday starred as a right-handed batsman in Tasmanian junior cricket and was selected for the Australia Under-19 cricket team training squad for the 2002 ICC Under-19 World Cup, but did not play for the team. He played one List A match for Tasmania, against South Australia on 21 January 2001, scoring one run.

In football, Munday plays on the wing and is a 200-game veteran and co-captain of the Burnie Dockers Football Club. He has also represented Tasmania many times.
