= John Cade (disambiguation) =

John Cade (1912–1980) was an Australian psychiatrist.

John Cade may also refer to:

- Jack Cade (1420–1450), leader of the Kent Rebellion
- John Cade (Knaresborough MP) (fl. 1571) for Knaresborough (UK Parliament constituency)
- John Cade (antiquarian) (1734–1806), English tradesman and writer on Roman remains
- John Cade (jockey) (1751–1826), St. Leger winning British jockey
- John H. Cade Jr. (1928–1988), Louisiana Republican state chairman
- John A. Cade (1929–1996), Maryland State Senator

== Characters ==
- Johnny Cade, a character in the 1967 novel The Outsiders by S. E. Hinton
