= Arthur Kade =

American financial advisor

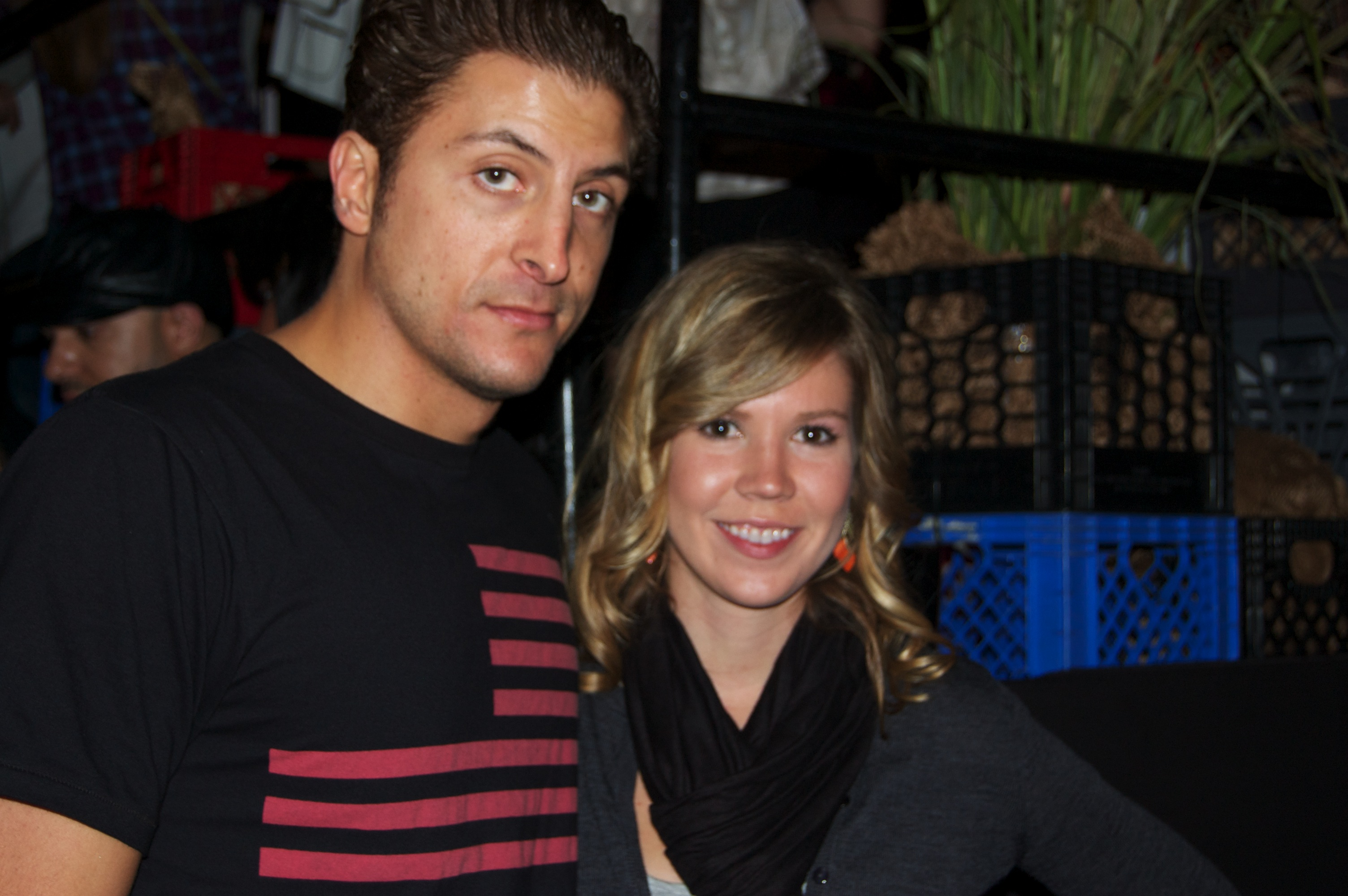
Image of Arthur Kade

Arthur Kade (né Kadyshes) is an American former financial adviser, actor, and television personality.

== Biography ==
Raised by his grandmother in Northeast Philadelphia, Kade attended Temple University. Upon graduation, he began a career as a financial adviser with American Express Financial Advisers. In early 2009, he embarked on what he calls "The Journey", a pursuit of his lifelong dream to become an actor and model.

Kade appeared as an extra in Gossip Girl and has been featured on television, radio, in blogs and newspapers, including a profile in Philadelphia Magazine.

He also appeared in an episode of the Showtime series La La Land, in which the Borat-like host Marc Wootton, hoping for "a master class in self-confidence", interviewed Kade while pretending to be a London cabbie wanting to become an actor.

Critics have argued that Kade's primary goal is to achieve fame at any cost, leading to criticism of his aggressive self-promotion

His behavior has even led some to speculate that his public persona is an elaborate performance art project. Authors James Frey and Anna David met Kade to investigate this theory. Frey, who says Kade's website is "one of the funniest, most absurd, most ridiculous things" he's ever seen, later wrote that he and David found Kade "nice and polite" and "a real person, one that was slightly delusional about himself, but not at all resembling the buffoon on his website or in his videos". Kade later blogged that the writers were "blown away with my looks and body", called Frey "an amazing author", and rated David "a cool, classy 7.5; probably a 9 fifteen years ago".

In 2010, Kade announced he was playing a character in an attempt to create a television show in the style of comedian Sacha Baron Cohen.

In 2011, he started interviewing celebrities and currently hosts the New York City-based talk show #InTheLab with Arthur Kade.
