= De Kade =

Coordinates: 52°26′22″N 4°49′36″E

De Kade was a 700-capacity live music venue located in Zaandam, Netherlands. It opened in 1997 and closed in 2013. Major artists performed at De Kade, including Glenn Hughes, Uriah Heep, Porcupine Tree and King Diamond.
