= Salusbury Cade =

English physician

- Born: 1660? Kent
- Died: 22 December 1720
- Occupation: Physician

Salusbury Cade (1660? – 22 December 1720) was an English physician.

== Biography ==
Cade was born in Kent about 1660, was educated as a foundation scholar at Lewisham grammar school. He was of Trinity College, Oxford, and graduated M.D. in 1691, having been admitted a licentiate of the Royal College of Physicians three years previously. He was elected a fellow in 1694, and was twice censor. He was appointed physician to St. Bartholomew's Hospital on 14 October 1708, and held the office till his death, on 22 December 1720. He lived at Greenwich till he obtained this appointment, and thenceforward in the Old Bailey. A Latin letter of Cade's, dated 8 September 1716, on the treatment of small-pox, is printed in Robert Freind's folio edition of Dr. John Freind's ‘Works’ (London, 1733). It shows him to have had a large experience of the disease. He makes the interesting observation that he had never known a case of hæmaturia in small-pox survive the sixteenth day from the eruption, and his remarks on treatment are enlightened. His name is met with as giving official sanction to books published during his censorship, and in the ‘Pharmacopœia Pauperum’ of 1718 a prescription of his for a powder to be taken internally for skin diseases is preserved. It was called Pulvis Æthiopicus, and consisted of one part of æthiopic mineral to two of crude antimony.
