= O. P. Kretzmann =

American pastor and university president (1901–1975)

14th President of Valparaiso University
- In office 1940–1968
- Succeeded by: Albert Huegli

Personal details
- Born: May 7, 1901 Stamford, Connecticut, United States
- Died: September 14, 1975 (aged 74)
- Occupations: Lutheran pastor, professor, author, university president

Academic background
- Education: Columbia University, Johns Hopkins University, Harvard University, University of Chicago
- Alma mater: Concordia Collegiate Institute (Bronxville, New York); Concordia Seminary (St. Louis, Missouri)

Academic work
- Institutions: Concordia Theological Seminary; Valparaiso University

Otto Paul (O. P.) Kretzmann (May 7, 1901 – September 14, 1975) was an American Lutheran pastor, professor, author, and long-tenured president of Valparaiso University.

== Early life and education ==
Otto Paul Kretzmann was born in Stamford, Connecticut in 1901 and grew up in New York City in a Lutheran family. His father, grandfather, and five brothers were all Lutheran pastors. He was called 'John' by family and close friends, but later went by and published under his initials, 'O. P.'. Kretzmann graduated from Concordia Collegiate Institute in Bronxville, New York in 1920. He attended Concordia Seminary in St. Louis, Missouri and graduated in 1924 with a master's degree in sacred theology. Kretzmann later studied for, but did not finish, further graduate degrees at Columbia University, Johns Hopkins University, Harvard University, and the University of Chicago.

== Career ==
From 1924 to 1934 Kretzmann was a faculty member at Concordia Theological Seminary, located at that time in Springfield, Illinois. He became executive secretary of the Walther League—an international Lutheran youth organization named for theologian C. F. W. Walther—in 1934, and served until 1940.

In 1940, Kretzmann became president of Valparaiso University in Valparaiso, Indiana, a position he held for 28 years. After stepping down from the presidency in 1968, he served as chancellor until 1974. Kretzmann was one of the most influential figures in the history of the university, presiding over a tenfold growth in enrollment. He was also one of the founders of The Cresset, the university's literature, public affairs, and arts review magazine.

O. P. Kretzmann had been awarded ten honorary doctoral degrees by the time of his death in 1975.

== Published works ==
- ——— (1935). Norman D. Kretzmann; John Paul Kretzmann (eds.). The Road Back to God (2003 ed.). Valparaiso University and Wheat Ridge Ministries. ISBN 0-9712294-1-4. A book of chapel devotions which were verbally delivered to participants of a summer camp between 1931 and 1935. The camp was for teenagers of the Central Illinois District of the Walther League, a Lutheran organization.
- ——— (1944). The Pilgrim, and anthology of articles which have appeared in ""The Cresset". St. Louis, MO: Concordia Publishing House. OCLC 273967281. - An anthology of articles from The Cresset, which was published by the Walther League.
- ——— (1950). Christian Higher Education (? date is not certain ed.). Valparaiso, IN: Valparaiso University Association. OCLC 22477426.
- Several books of sermons
- Collections of devotionals, which Kretzmann called "Devotional Readings for Times of Change", including The Road Back to God

Academic offices
Preceded by Oscar C. Kreinheder	15th President of Valparaiso University; 1940–1968	Succeeded by Albert G. Huegli
