= Joe Cade =

American baseball player

- Pitcher
- Born: April 5, 1900; St. Louis, Missouri, US
- Threw: Right

Negro league baseball debut
- 1929, for the Bacharach Giants

Last appearance
- 1929, for the Bacharach Giants

Teams
- Bacharach Giants (1929)

Joseph Cade (April 5, 1900 – death date unknown) was an American Negro league pitcher in the 1920s.

A native of St. Louis, Missouri, Cade played for the Bacharach Giants in 1929. In 11 recorded games on the mound, he posted a 6.56 ERA over 35.2 innings.
