= Max Kade =

German-American businessman (1882–1967)

Dr. h.c. Max Kade (13 October 1882, Steinbach near Schwäbisch Hall, Württemberg, Germany – 15 July 1967, Davos, Switzerland) was an emigrant from Germany to New York City who became successful in the pharmaceutical industry. Kade was committed to advancing German-American relations. He established a foundation in New York to promote scientific and technical progress and to further the peaceful coexistence of nations.

== Life ==
Max Kade was born October 13, 1882, in Steinbach, a village near Schwäbisch Hall, Germany. His father was a partner in a machine factory and iron foundry. After finishing school, Kade completed a commercial apprenticeship in his father's business. Later he lived in Völklingen and Antwerp. In 1904 he emigrated to North America, living first in Montreal, then moving to New York in 1907. With a partner, he founded Seeck & Kade Inc., a pharmaceutical company, which after 1911 he directed alone. The company had great success with its cough syrup "Pertussin".

On January 26, 1908, Kade married Annette Marie Baudais. They had no children. In the 1920s the couple began to lend their fortune to philanthropic and social causes. Great attention was bestowed upon his home city, Steinbach, which had become part of Schwäbisch Hall in 1930. Kade was also an art collector and a patron of the arts who made many valuable gifts to German museums.

In addition to his honorary citizenship of Steinbach (1929) and Schwäbisch Hall (1935), Max Kade received numerous honors from the universities he aided. He died on July 15, 1967, at the age of 85 years, during a stay at a health resort in Davos, Switzerland. He was buried in Steinbach.

== Max Kade Foundation ==
In 1944, Kade and his wife founded the Max Kade Foundation in New York. Following World War II, the foundation concentrated primarily on the needs of war victims and rescuing works of art and other objects of the German cultural heritage. Later it shifted its focus to supporting university activities, in particular, German-American cultural relations. One of its primary goals involves the promotion of mutual understanding of the people and cultures of Germany and the United States. The foundation has funded research facilities, libraries, dormitories, meeting places, as well as German and German-American studies programs. Max Kade Houses or Institutes exist at 30 locations in the United States and 17 in Germany.
