= Valparaiso University =

Lutheran university in Valparaiso, Indiana, US

- Former names: Valparaiso Male and Female College (1859–1871); Northern Indiana Normal School and Business Institute (1873–1900) Valparaiso College (1900–1906)
- Motto: In luce tua videmus lucem (Latin)
- Motto in English: In Thy light we see light
- Type: Private university
- Established: 1859; 167 years ago
- Religious affiliation: Lutheran
- Academic affiliations: Space-grant
- Endowment: $321.45 million (2025)
- President: Rev. Brian E. Konkol
- Faculty: 191 full-time
- Students: 2,451 (fall 2025)
- Undergraduates: 2,071 (fall 2025)
- Postgraduates: 380 (fall 2025)
- Location: Valparaiso, Indiana, U.S. 41°27′49″N 87°02′37″W
- Campus: Suburban, 350 acres (141.6 ha)
- Newspaper: The Torch
- Radio: WVUR-FM
- Colors: Brown and gold
- Nickname: Beacons
- Website: www.valpo.edu

Valparaiso University (Valpo) is a private university in Valparaiso, Indiana, United States. It is an independent Lutheran university with five colleges. As of Fall 2025, the university enrolls 2,451 students and has a 350-acre (140 ha) campus.

The university is known for its Lutheran Christian heritage and has one of the largest chapels on a U.S. college campus. In 2025, it accepted 89% of applicants for enrollment.

== History ==
=== Valparaiso Male and Female College ===
In 1859, residents of the city of Valparaiso raised $11,000 in support of the Methodist Church locating the college there. The school opened on September 21, 1859, to 75 students, and was one of the first coeducational colleges in the nation. Students paid tuition expenses of $8 per term (three terms per year), plus nearby room and board costs of approximately $2 per week. Instruction at the college began with young children, and most of the students were in elementary and grade levels. Courses at the collegiate level included math, literature, history, sciences, and philosophy. Courses stressing the Christian faith included "moral philosophy" and "moral science." During the Civil War, many students and administrators enrolled in the army. Financing problems led to the closing of the school in 1871.

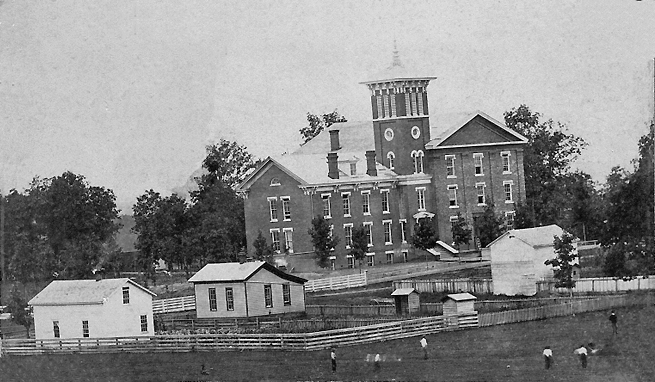
Valparaiso Male and Female College, circa 1870

=== Northern Indiana Normal School and Business Institute ===
The school, reopened by Henry Baker Brown in 1873, was named the Northern Indiana Normal School and Business Institute.

=== Valparaiso College, then Valparaiso University ===
In 1900, the school was renamed Valparaiso College and gained its current university status after being rechartered in 1906.

In 1902, Valparaiso became affiliated with the American College of Medicine and Surgery. The name was later changed to the Chicago College of Medicine and Surgery in 1907. Students could save money by spending their first two medical college years in Valparaiso.

In 1905, Valparaiso formed an affiliation with Chicago College of Dental Surgery to provide dental education for its students. For the next two decades, Valparaiso gained a national reputation as an economic institution of higher learning, earning its positive nickname The Poor Man’s Harvard. At the height of enrollment in 1907, it was the second-largest school in the nation, behind only Harvard University. In 1914, the monthly literary magazine The Torch was founded; it became the university's weekly student newspaper in 1915.

The university began intercollegiate athletic competition in 1916. Valparaiso's first game was a basketball game against the Chicago YMCA Training School, in which Valparaiso fielded players from intramural teams.

In 1917, World War I and the death of President Brown took their toll, and the school was forced into bankruptcy. Valparaiso University sold the Chicago College of Medicine and Surgery to Loyola University Chicago. In 1923, a fire destroyed the original 1860 Old College Building, and Valparaiso could not afford to clean the site. This was one of many financial problems Valparaiso faced in 1923, as President Horace M. Evans tried to settle a $375,000 debt. Evans appealed to the Rockefeller Foundation and other wealthy individuals before asking the Indiana state legislature to make the university public. The legislature refused, and Evans almost sold the university to the Ku Klux Klan, but the deal was stopped due to "legal technicalities", likely cited to save face for both organizations.

Valparaiso University was eventually bought by the Lutheran University Association, a conglomerate of the National Lutheran Education Alliance and American Luther League.

=== Lutheran revival ===
In July 1925, the Lutheran University Association, affiliated with the Lutheran Church – Missouri Synod, took over ownership of the school. The association was a group of clergy and church laity that saw promise in the school and wanted to create an academic institution not controlled by any church denomination. Valparaiso is still operated by the Lutheran University Association and remains an independent Lutheran institution that enjoys close relations with the Lutheran Church – Missouri Synod and Evangelical Lutheran Church in America.

On March 13, 1929, the North Central Association of Colleges and Schools accredited the university. Two years later, President Kreinheder created the Valparaiso University Guild, a volunteer and philanthropy organization to help students, and in 1934 the Alumni Association began operation. The university's College of Engineering started a cooperative education program with Purdue University in 1938. At the end of the 1930s, the university completed a new gymnasium. In 1941, Valparaiso instituted its Department of Art. Coincident with the beginning of World War II, Valparaiso University renamed its yearbook from The Uhlan (a German soldier) to The Beacon. The next year Valparaiso changed its athletic team name from the Uhlans to the Crusaders.

=== Golden Era ===
In 1940, O. P. Kretzmann became president of the university. During his 28 years in office, he marshaled significant changes, many of which remain in place. Valparaiso University bought about 90 acres (36 ha) of land in 1944 east of campus near the corner of Sturdy Road and US Highway 30. The large oak tree occupying this land was named "Merlin" and remains a central feature of the campus. This purchase would transform the campus, as the university moved to its current location over many years.

Kretzmann increased enrollment from 400 to more than 4,000. Academic rigor increased along with enrollment. Valparaiso created its Honor Code in 1943 and remains in place today, as students continue to write the code on top of assignments. After the Second World War, Valparaiso offered its first four-year degrees: mechanical, civil, and electrical engineering. On November 27, 1956, the Chapel Auditorium burned down. The university quickly rebuilt its worship space: the Chapel of the Resurrection was dedicated on September 27, 1959. Valparaiso installed a subcritical nuclear reactor in 1958, and in the 1970s the University Branch of the United States Atomic Energy Commission called Valpo's nuclear physics lab "a model for all small universities wishing to provide excellent training in the field of undergraduate physics."

President Kretzmann founded Christ College, the honors college of Valparaiso University, in 1967. Christ College was only the third such honors college in the nation. The campus radio station WVUR-FM began broadcasting in 1960. Robert F. Kennedy spoke before 5,000 people in 1968 at VU while campaigning, and in the same year, the university began its long-standing international study centers in Cambridge, England, and Reutlingen, Germany. During student protests in 1970, Kinsey Hall burned. The first class of the College of Nursing graduated in 1971. In 1976, Valparaiso University began NCAA Division I competition.

In 1991, Valparaiso became home to the Lilly Fellows Program, a national program that supports young scholar-teachers, during its inaugural year. This program has grown to almost 100 universities. The 1998 men's basketball team reached the Sweet Sixteen of the Division I national tournament. In 2002, a new international study center was established in Hangzhou, China (since shuttered). Phi Beta Kappa established a chapter at Valparaiso University in 2004. In 2013 the university completed a solar furnace and research facility, the only undergraduate institution to operate a solar furnace, and one of only five solar furnaces in the US.

=== Enrollment declines and financial challenges ===
In 2008, Mark Heckler became Valparaiso University's 18th president. During his initial years in office, Heckler embarked on the "most comprehensive and collaborative strategic-planning endeavor in the University’s history". The plan included goals such as increasing enrollment to 6,000 students, multiple building initiatives, and increased global engagement; however student enrollment never increased as desired, and the university began to face serious financial strain as construction debt servicing and administrative staffing costs grew, while student enrollment faltered at the undergraduate level. At the graduate level, poor rates of law students passing the bar exam led to a drop-off in enrollment and accreditation challenges.

After 2015, Valparaiso University began to struggle with enrollment and retention of students. The student population dropped from 4,544 in the fall of 2015 to 2,939 in the fall of 2022 and the law school was closed in 2020. During the COVID-19 pandemic, the university's enrollment and budgetary problems reached an acute point, resulting in the discontinuances of multiple undergraduate programs (secondary education major, theatre major and minor, Chinese minor, French major, Greek and Roman studies major and minor). Due to financial stress, the university also laid off numerous lecturers and more than a dozen other tenure-track faculty in remaining programs and offered a retirement incentive buy-out package to long-term faculty and staff to incentivize voluntary departures. Meanwhile, the student retention rate also fell to 77%.

Amid these enrollment struggles, the university has also faced controversy. In 2021, the Indiana Attorney General's office announced an investigation into the university's Confucius Institute, alleging that it promotes Chinese propaganda. The university closed the institute and denied the allegations. In 2023, the board of directors decided to sell three paintings, including one by Georgia O'Keeffe, from the Brauer Museum of Art to renovate freshman dorms. This raised strong opposition from the namesake of the museum and protest from some faculty and students about the erosion of the arts. The university eventually closed the museum and eliminated the corresponding staff positions, including its namesake director. The university announced in early 2024 that 28 additional programs would go into review for discontinuance due to budgetary problems, and embarked on the closure and demolition of additional buildings to reduce utilities costs. Later that year in July, VU confirmed the discontinuance of 30 programs.

== Campus ==
=== Old campus ===
Old College Building, Valparaiso University, circa 1918

The Old Campus of Valparaiso University is adjacent to and a part of the historic downtown district of the city. Old Campus is the site of the School of Law, made up of Wesemann Hall and Heritage Hall. Heritage was the oldest remaining building on the campus and was put on the National Register of Historic Places in 1976. In 2009, the school started a restoration project, essentially rebuilding the facility. The school's fraternities and the Kade-Duesenberg German House and Cultural Center are on an old campus as was the Martin Luther King, Jr., Cultural Center before acts of vandalism and arson destroyed the building in 2009. Old Campus is also the site of Valpo's Doppler weather radar. North of Old Campus is Lebien Hall, home to the College of Nursing and Health Professions.

=== New campus ===
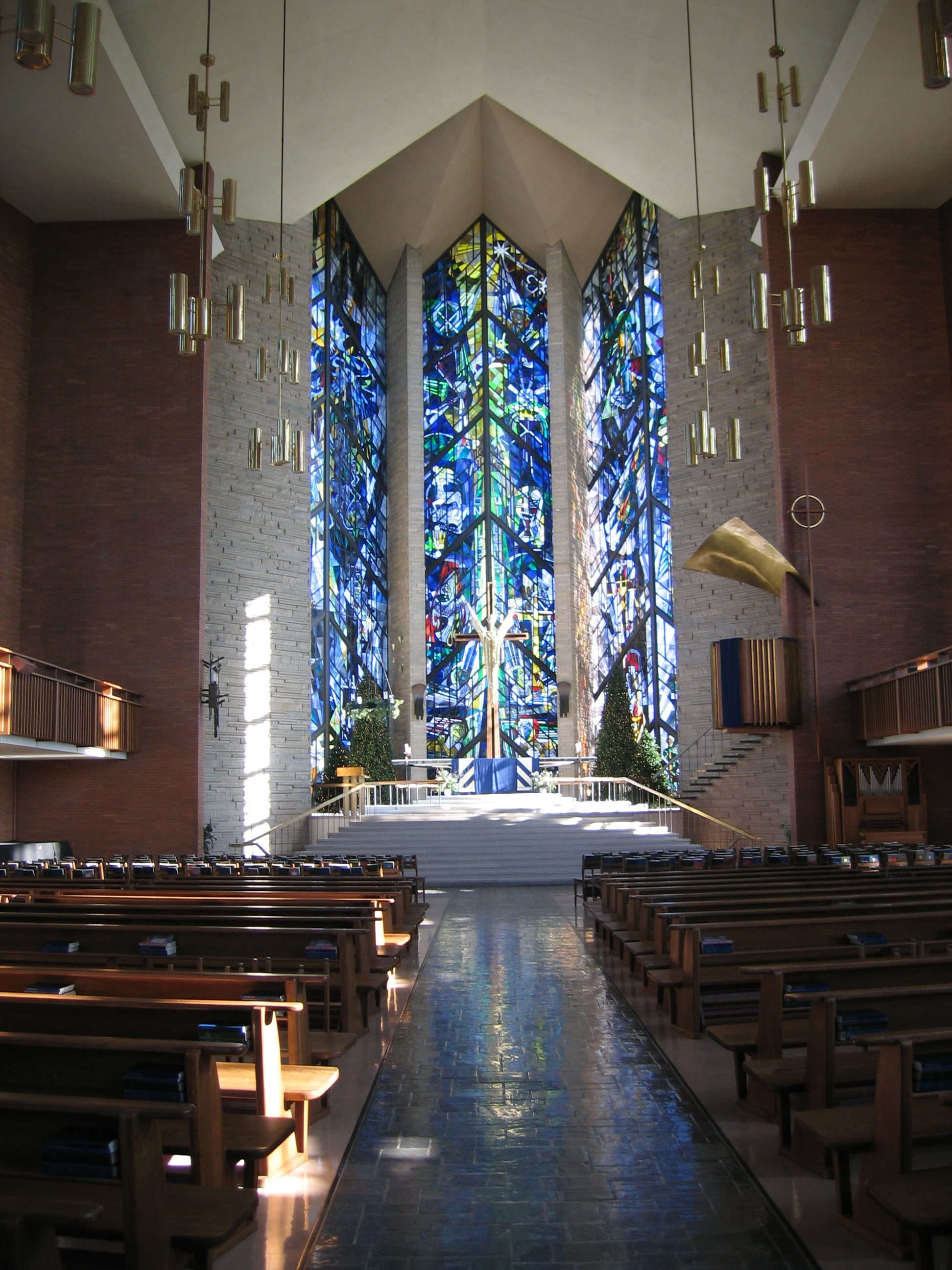
Chapel of the Resurrection

Beginning in the 1950s, the school expanded eastward to occupy what is now known as the "new campus". Today, it is the center of the university, home to thousands of students in nine dormitories as well as most of the academic buildings.

At the center of campus is the Chapel of the Resurrection, a 98-foot (30 m)-a high building that is the home of Valparaiso University's many worship services and convocations. Built on the highest elevation on the university's campus, it has been a Northwest Indiana landmark since 1959. In 2011, Rev. Mark and Kathy Helge gave a $15-million gift for a major expansion to the chapel. The 11,000-square-foot (1,000 m^{2}) addition opened in the fall of 2015.

The Christopher Center Library (built in 2004) houses over 500,000 books and numerous video and audio resources. It is a popular place for students to gather and study. The Valparaiso University Center for the Arts (VUCA) offers multiple performance facilities and the Center houses the nationally renowned Brauer Museum of Art.

Kallay-Christopher Hall opened in 2004 and is home to the Department of Geography and Meteorology. Kallay-Christopher has an observation deck and large weather lab facilities. Adjoining Kallay-Christopher Hall is Schnabel Hall, which is home to communications students, WVUR-FM, the university's student-run radio station, and VUTV, the university's student-run television station.

The Donald V. Fites Innovations Center, an addition to the College of Engineering's Gellersen Hall, was completed in the summer of 2011. The LEED-certified building has two suites of labs that support advanced undergraduate research in areas such as materials science and energy systems. The Department of Physics and Astronomy has a 16-inch (406 mm) computerized reflecting telescope to aid in NASA research and VisBox-X2, a virtual reality system used to immerse students in a visualized three-dimensional image.

The 52,000-square-foot (4,800 m^{2}) Arts and Sciences Building, adjacent to the Christopher Center for Library and Information Resources, opened in 2012 and houses classrooms and offices for faculty in the College of Arts and Sciences.

The James S. Markiewicz Solar Energy Research Facility was dedicated in September 2013. Professors and students use the energy research facility, profiled in The Atlantic, in developing methods to produce low-carbon magnesium with 90 percent less fossil fuel energy than standard production methods.

The 202,000-square-foot (18,800 m^{2}) Harre Union opened in 2009. Named in honor of former University President Alan F. Harre, who retired in 2008, it is more than three times the size of the previous union. The Harre Union has consolidated all dining services on campus, except the law school. It has room for all student organizations, as well as a new bookstore, lounge areas, student mailboxes for every student on campus, entertainment areas, a large ballroom, a career center, and an outdoor terrace overlooking the chapel. The design architect was Sasaki Associates, Inc. and the architect of record was Design Organization.

In June 2013, the Duesenberg Welcome Center on campus was completed for visitors coming to campus. The creation of this building was funded by Valparaiso University alumni, Richard and Phyllis Duesenberg.

A new residence hall, Beacon Hall, opened in 2014.

A "STEM village" of three new buildings will soon replace Neils Science Center and become the new home for the biology, chemistry, and physics departments. The first of these buildings was completed in 2017. Neils Science Center was erected in 1974 and includes a planetarium, greenhouse, and a now decommissioned subcritical nuclear reactor that helped the facility received an Atomic Energy Commission citation as a model undergraduate physics laboratory. The new 55,000-square-foot (5,110 m^{2}) Center for the Sciences: Chemistry and Biochemistry opened in fall 2017.

== Academics ==
=== Undergraduate programs ===
Valparaiso is organized into five undergraduate colleges: Arts and Sciences, Business, Engineering, Nursing and Health Professions, and Christ College.

==== College of Arts and Sciences ====
The College of Arts and Sciences integrates liberal arts and professional development. It provides hands-on, undergraduate research opportunities and internships to accompany the classroom experience. With more than 70 academic programs in 21 departments, the College of Arts and Sciences supplies the liberal arts core for all programs.

==== College of Business ====
The College of Business is among the elite 25 percent of undergraduate business programs nationally accredited by the AACSB International — The Association to Advance Collegiate Schools of Business. The College of Business offers focused majors in accounting, business analytics, finance, international business, management, and marketing. Starting in 2018 Fall, the college of business is offering a new major and minor in supply chain and logistics management.

==== College of Engineering ====
The 2021 U.S. News & World Report named the College of Engineering the 13th-best undergraduate engineering program among institutions that do not have doctorate programs. The College of Engineering won the 2012 Engineering Award presented by the National Council of Examiners for Engineering. About 90 percent of undergraduates complete the program within four years. The college provides several service learning opportunities as well as undergraduate research opportunities.

==== Christ College ====
Christ College is the interdisciplinary Honors College of Valparaiso University. Known on campus as "CC", Christ College was chartered by President O. P. Kretzmann in 1967. In 1964, Kretzmann convened a committee to plan a successor to the Directed Studies Program, which was established to better serve the influx of gifted students to the institution. This new college within VU would seek students who had "a passion for learning and the pursuit of excellence generally."

The Christ College curriculum was to be based, in part, on the University of Chicago's "Liberal Arts" core model. Incoming freshmen would read classical texts and use the Socratic Method to discover "that they did not know what they thought they knew." In later years, courses that transcend assignment to a particular academic discipline challenged students to explore important questions from an imaginative perspective. This structure remains intact as every freshman enrolls in the Freshman Program, which consists of a 16-credit, two-semester course that introduces students to classic works of history, literature, art, music, philosophy, religion and theology, and social science.

In addition to classes, several traditions create camaraderie and foster the intellectual formation of students. The most notable of these annual events are the fall Christ College Freshman Production and the spring Christ College Oxford Debates. The Freshman Production is an original play or musical that is written, scored, choreographed, directed, produced, and performed exclusively by members of the Christ College freshman class. The Christ College Oxford Debates are a series of formal debates in which two groups of students represent either the affirmative or negative side of a topic they have researched for five or six weeks. Following the debate, the debate moderator asks the audience members to "vote their minds" and decide the winner of the debate. Another notable academic opportunity offered by Christ College is the Student Scholarship Symposium, in which undergraduates present research in a formal lecture setting. It features student-selected research projects, from a diverse set of academic fields, delivered in a critical and interactive environment. Students in the college often spend a semester studying at one of Valparaiso's overseas study centers; many take a Christ College Abroad course, which is led by faculty each spring break.

Approximately 90 students, or 10 percent of the university's incoming class, are admitted each year. Students in the honors college concurrently enroll in another undergraduate college at Valparaiso and can complete their study with a major or a minor in humanities to complement the major received in their main field of study.

=== Graduate studies ===
Valparaiso University offers a variety of master's, doctoral, and graduate certificate programs.

=== Law school ===
Founded in 1879, the Law School was accredited by the American Bar Association in 1929 and the Association of American of Law Schools in 1930. In 2010, Valparaiso law students had an 83 percent first-time bar pass rate. After a censure by the ABA in October 2016, the university sought to downsize the law school or merge it with another institution. In November 2017, the university announced the law school would not enroll a new class in 2018, and in October 2018 the university announced it would close the law school and was developing a plan to allow the remaining students to complete their degrees.

=== Study abroad ===
More than a third of all undergraduate students study abroad, placing Valparaiso University among the top 40 institutions in the country. VU offers more than 40 study-abroad programs around the world, and the duration of study-abroad programs ranges from a week to a full academic year. In 2013, the U.S. Department of State named VU as one of the colleges and universities that produced the most Fulbright scholars. Between 2003 and 2013, 26 Valparaiso students studied abroad as a Fulbright scholar.

Valpo maintains four global study centers (Cambridge, England; Reutlingen, Germany; Hangzhou, China; and San José, Costa Rica), each of which provides group trips and excursions, a course on the life and culture of the host country, and specialized housing, all under the guidance of an on-site resident director. Valparaiso partners with International Education Programs, or IEP. Other sites students can study in include Athens, Greece; Granada, Spain; Zaragoza, Spain; Cergy-Pointoise, France; La Rochelle, France; Paris, France; Limerick, Ireland; Newcastle, Australia; Rottenburg am Neckar, Germany; Tübingen, Germany; Chiang Mai, Thailand; Delhi, India; Coimbatore, India; Osaka, Japan; Viña Del Mar, Chile; Puebla, Mexico; and Windhoek, Namibia.

=== Distance learning ===
The university offers online degree programs such as the Post-MSN Doctorate in Nursing Practice. The accelerated degree programs are Web-based.

== Reputation and rankings ==
Academic rankings

National
- Forbes: 384
- U.S. News & World Report: 204
- WSJ/College Pulse: 261

In the 2025 U.S. News & World Report university rankings, Valparaiso was ranked tied for 204th among national universities. U.S. News & World Report rated the university 45th in "Best Value Schools", tied for 262nd in Top Performers on Social Mobility, and tied for 15th in Best Undergraduate Engineering Programs.

Washington Monthly, which publishes its College Guide annually, ranked Valparaiso #149 for social mobility, #182 for research, and #291 for service among national universities in 2021.

== Student body ==
=== Students ===
Valparaiso University Students are from geographically diverse backgrounds. Of the nearly 3,000 students, only one-third are from the school's home state of Indiana. The remainder comes from almost every other state of the United States and nearly 50 countries. Over half graduate in the top quarter of their high school class, and 77 percent return to Valparaiso after their freshman year. Annually, more than $26 million is awarded by the university to more than 80 percent of the student body, which is administered based on factors such as community involvement, interests, recommendations, and personality, as well as grade point average, class ranking, and standardized test scores.

Sixty-one percent of Valparaiso University students live on the school's city campus and all students who do not have senior status are required to live in residence halls. Eleven percent of students are Lutheran, and 75 percent participate in faith-related activities. Valparaiso supports more than 100 student-administered organizations, clubs, and activities. Fifty percent participate in intramural athletics, and more than 1,000 students give more than 45,000 hours of community service to the region each year.

=== Greek life ===
More than 25 percent of Valparaiso students are members of one of the school's ten national fraternities or seven national sororities. The 2013-2014 Fraternity & Sorority Life Annual Report documented more than 10,000 hours of community service and $45,000 of financial report to local and national non-profits. All but one organization had a cumulative GPA above 3.0 during the spring semester, and the average GPA across all of Greek Life was 3.247.

=== Honor societies ===
Valparaiso hosts chapters of all major honors fraternities, including Mortar Board National College Senior Honor Society.

=== Student activism ===
Valparaiso University has a history of student activism. Prominent examples with long-lasting effects include:

==== Kinsey Hall fire ====
While many colleges amended or canceled the remainder of the 1969–1970 school year after the Kent State shootings due to unrest, the Valparaiso administration ignored student calls for seminars and forums about violence at other campuses. A large group of students then organized a protest march from the campus Victory Bell to the Porter County courthouse. Continued protests led to discussions between the administration and student leaders. When these talks failed, still-unidentified students set fire to the empty Kinsey Hall administrative building in the early morning. The fire destroyed the building.

==== Student-led restoration of the engineering college ====
The existence of Valparaiso University's College of Engineering is the result of student activism. The university's engineering program had been reduced to a two-year associate degree in response to reduced enrollment during an economic depression, which dominated the 1930s. When students began inquiring in 1948 regarding the possibility of restoring a four-year degree program, university president O.P. Kretzmann cited a lack of space and lack of resources to build a new facility. Students responded with an offer to build the new facility if he would guarantee faculty positions, to which the president agreed. The students constructed the facility themselves using their engineering education and an intense fundraising campaign, and by 1951 the new College of Engineering was again granting four-year bachelor's degrees. This story received national attention and was the subject of the feature-length film Venture of Faith. In 1968, the College of Engineering was rehoused in the newly built Gellersen Engineering and Mathematics Center. Following the fire at Kinsey Hall, the old engineering building became the home to the Art department. On April 29, 2022, the building, which had been renamed to the Art-Psychology building, had a fire that resulted in the complete loss of the building.

=== Student media ===
Valparaiso University's student media organizations (WVUR: The Source, VUTV, The Beacon, The Torch, and The Lighter) are long-standing.

== Athletics ==
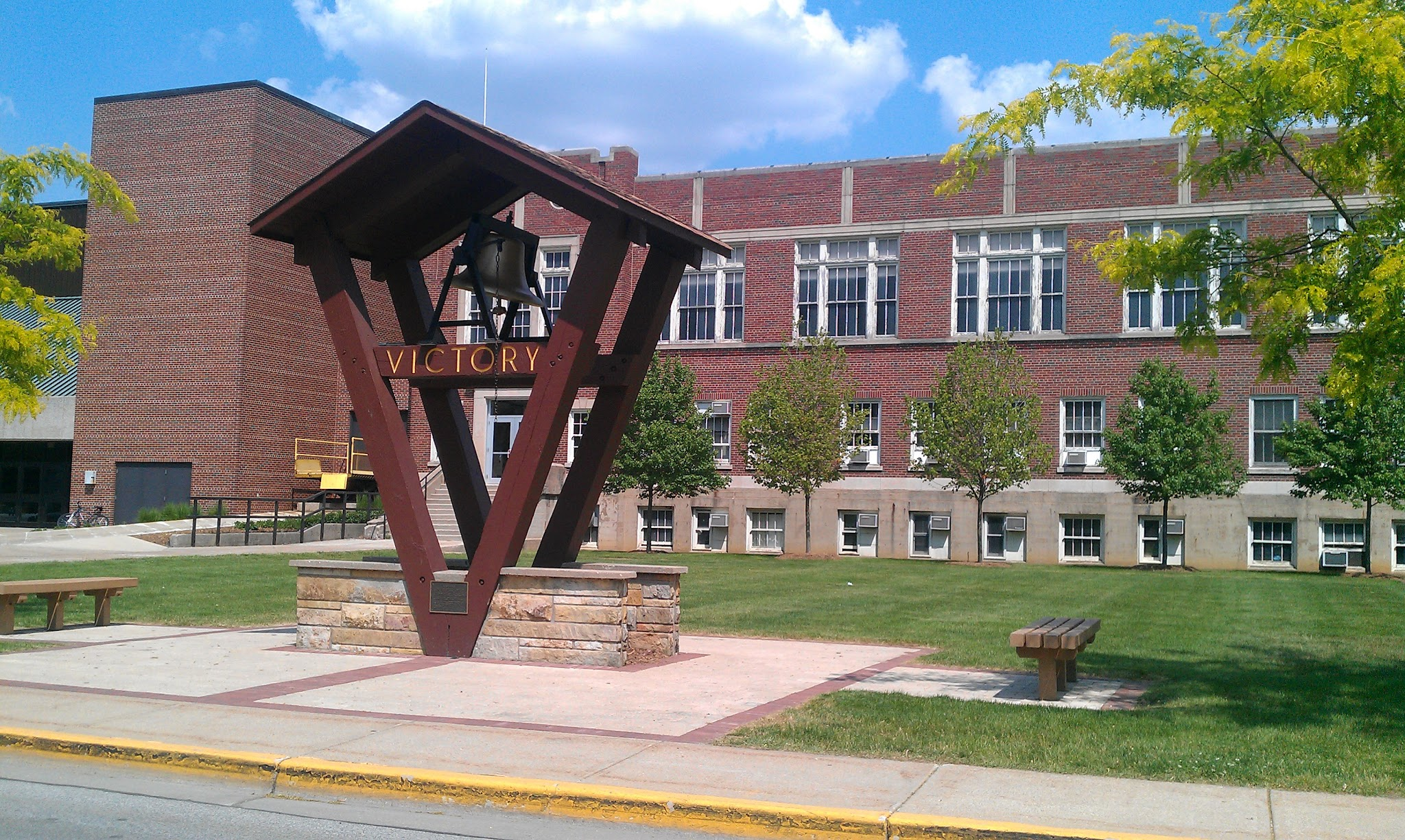
The Victory Bell, rung after athletic victories and campus celebrations, stands near the Athletics and Recreation Center.

Valparaiso's colors are brown and gold and athletic teams are known as the Beacons. Most athletic events are held in the Athletics-Recreation Center (ARC), which is the primary sporting facility on campus. Valparaiso's eighteen teams and nearly 600 student-athletes mostly participate in NCAA Division I (I-FCS for football) in the Missouri Valley Conference. Valparaiso competes in four sports that the MVC does not sponsor. The football team plays in the Pioneer Football League at Brown Field. Men's swimming and men's tennis compete in the Summit League, and bowling (a women-only sport at the NCAA level) competes in Conference USA.

In 1942, Valparaiso University fielded the tallest basketball team in the world, and the so-called "Valparaiso Giants" or "The World's Tallest Team" played at Madison Square Garden in the 1944–1945 season. The VU football team played in the Cigar Bowl on New Year's Day 1951. Valparaiso is also known for its men's basketball head coach Homer Drew and his son Bryce Drew, who led the team to its Sweet Sixteen appearance in the 1998 NCAA basketball tournament by making "The Shot", a three-point shot as time expired, to beat favored Ole Miss by one point. Bryce Drew was named head coach in the spring of 2011. Valparaiso is also the home of the National Lutheran Basketball Tournament.

The men's soccer team won the Horizon League regular season conference championship in 2011. Men's basketball followed with a 2011 Horizon League crown of its own while the baseball and softball teams both won regular season and Horizon League Tournament titles, representing the conference in the NCAA Tournament. In addition, the bowling team earned a berth at the NCAA Championships in just its third season of existence. In addition, Head Coach Carin Avery led the women's volleyball team to great success recently. In their 2014–2015 season, they pursued their 13th consecutive 20-win season. They were one of 10 programs nationwide to have won at least 20 matches in each of the previous 12 years, during which time Avery led the team to three conference regular season and tournament championships, as well as advancing to the NCAA Tournament on three occasions. In the spring of 2013 the men's golf team won the Horizon League Championship and advanced to the NCAA Tournament.

NCAA Division I teams include baseball (men), basketball, bowling (women), cross country, football (men), golf, soccer, softball (women), swimming, tennis, track & field, and volleyball. The university has cheerleading and spirit squads, as well as several intramural and club sports: flag football, innertube water polo, miniature golf, sand volleyball, soccer, softball, swimming, tennis, ultimate frisbee, and volleyball.

On February 11, 2021, Valparaiso announced it would retire the "Crusaders" nickname because of the "negative connotation and violence associated with the Crusader imagery". On August 10, 2021 "Beacons" was announced as the new nickname.

== Notable people ==
=== Faculty ===
- Marcia Bunge, theologian in Christ College from 1997 to 2012 who researches children and childhood in religion and ethics
- Faisal Kutty, law; internationally recognized scholar, writer and public speaker
- Gilbert Meilaender, ethics and theology; held the Duesenberg Chair in Christian Ethics from 1996 to 2014, as of 2020 Senior Research Professor of Theology. Also serves as a Fellow of the Hastings Center and as Paul Ramsey Fellow at the Notre Dame Center for Ethics and Culture
- Walter Wangerin, Jr., English and theology; National Book Award winning author of The Book of the Dun Cow
