= List of Lutheran denominations =

Lutheran denominations are Protestant church bodies that identify, to a greater or lesser extent, with the theology of Martin Luther and with the writings contained in the Book of Concord. Most Lutheran denominations are affiliated with one or more regional, national, or international associations, the largest of which—the Lutheran World Federation—has over 74 million members worldwide. There are also two smaller and more conservative international associations—the International Lutheran Council, with 7.15 million members, and the Confessional Evangelical Lutheran Conference, with approximately 500,000 members. Finally, the Global Confessional and Missional Lutheran Forum (Global Forum) is a global gathering of Confessional Lutheran bodies who wish to emphasize missional discipleship as the focal point of ministry in the world.

This list is grouped by affiliation with the four major international Lutheran associations mentioned above. This list does not include groups that have been merged into other groups (e.g. Hauge Synod) nor groups that have become defunct (e.g. Eielsen Synod). Some of the denominations belong to more than one of the four associations.

== Lutheran World Federation ==
The Lutheran World Federation (LWF) is the largest association of national and regional Lutheran church bodies in the world. Founded in 1947 by 47 church bodies from 26 countries, the LWF has grown to include 145 church bodies in 98 countries.

Country	Church body	Year founded	Members (Note: Membership numbers are the most recent available as of April 2018.)	Ref
Angola	Evangelical Lutheran Church of Angola	--	49,500	
Argentina	Evangelical Church of the River Plate (Note: United Church)	c. 1965	27,500	
Argentina	United Evangelical Lutheran Church	--	11,000	
Australia	Lutheran Church of Australia (Note: Associate member) (Note: Member of both the Lutheran World Federation and the International Lutheran Council)	1966	48,760	
Austria	Protestant Church of the Augsburg Confession in Austria	--	302,875	
Bangladesh	Bangladesh Lutheran Church	--	6,000	
Bangladesh	Bangladesh Northern Evangelical Lutheran Church	--	10,000	
Bolivia	Bolivian Evangelical Lutheran Church	1972	14,000	
Botswana	Evangelical Lutheran Church in Botswana	--	18,800	
Brazil	Evangelical Church of the Lutheran Confession in Brazil	1824	671,389	
Cameroon	Church of the Lutheran Brethren of Cameroon	1969	157,276	
Cameroon	Evangelical Lutheran Church in Cameroon	--	350,000	
Canada	Evangelical Lutheran Church in Canada	1986	114,431	
Central African Republic	Evangelical Lutheran Church of the Central African Republic	--	120,000	
Chile	Evangelical Lutheran Church in Chile	1906	3,000	
Chile	Lutheran Church in Chile	1975	1,976	
Colombia	Evangelical Lutheran Church of Colombia	--	1,701	
Costa Rica	Lutheran Costa Rican Church	1988	500	
Croatia	Evangelical Church in the Republic of Croatia	--	3,329	
Czech Republic	Evangelical Church of Czech Brethren	1918	78,299	
Czech Republic	Silesian Evangelical Church of the Augsburg Confession	--	16,000	
Democratic Republic of the Congo	Evangelical Lutheran Church in Congo	c. 1960	122,055	
Denmark	Evangelical Lutheran Church in Denmark	1536	4,276,271	
El Salvador	Salvadoran Lutheran Church	--	20,000	
Eritrea	Evangelical Lutheran Church of Eritrea	--	11,000	
Estonia	Estonian Evangelical Lutheran Church	1917	180,000	
Ethiopia	Ethiopian Evangelical Church Mekane Yesus (Note: Also member of the Global Confessional and Missional Lutheran Forum)	1959	8,310,129	
Finland	Evangelical Lutheran Church of Finland	1809	3,625,007	
France	Protestant Church of Augsburg Confession of Alsace and Lorraine	2006	250,000	
France	Malagasy Protestant Church in France	--	10,000	
France	United Protestant Church of France	2012	330,000	
Germany	Evangelical Lutheran Church in Baden	1850	2,906	
Germany	Evangelical Lutheran Church in Bavaria (Note: Member of the EKD)	--	2,456,140	
Germany	Evangelical Lutheran Church in Brunswick	--	341,919	
Germany	Evangelical Church in Central Germany	2009	766,416	
Germany	Evangelical Lutheran Church of Hanover	--	2,714,781	
Germany	Church of Lippe (Lutheran section)	1888	28,000	
Germany	Evangelical Lutheran Church in Northern Germany	2012	2,063,904	
Germany	Evangelical Lutheran Church in Oldenburg	--	423,756	
Germany	Evangelical Lutheran Church of Saxony	--	701,008	
Germany	Evangelical Lutheran Church of Schaumburg-Lippe	--	54,159	
Germany	Evangelical Church in Württemberg	--	2,054,505	
Ghana	Evangelical Lutheran Church of Ghana	1958	29,000	
Guatemala	Guatemala Lutheran Church	--	300	
Guyana	Evangelical Lutheran Church in Guyana	--	16,153	
Honduras	Christian Lutheran Church of Honduras	--	1,700	
Hong Kong	Hong Kong and Macau Lutheran Church	--	2,201	
Hong Kong	Chinese Rhenish Church Hong Kong Synod	--	13,500	
Hong Kong	Evangelical Lutheran Church of Hong Kong	1954	18,351	
Hong Kong	Tsung Tsin Mission of Hong Kong	--	11,278	
Hungary	Evangelical Lutheran Church in Hungary	--	179,618	
Iceland	Evangelical Lutheran Church of Iceland	--	227,266	
India	Andhra Evangelical Lutheran Church (Note: Member of the United Evangelical Lutheran Churches in India)	--	4,50,000	
India	Arcot Lutheran Church	--	40,000	
India	Bodo Evangelical Lutheran Church	--	11,510	
India	Evangelical Lutheran Church in Madhya Pradesh	--	20,000	
India	Evangelical Lutheran Church in the Himalayan States	--	27,345	
India	Good Shepherd Evangelical Lutheran Church	--	13,280	
India	Gossner Evangelical Lutheran Church in Chotanagpur and Assam	--	382,790	
India	India Evangelical Lutheran Church	1958	125,000	
India	Jeypore Evangelical Lutheran Church	--	175,000	
India	Northern Evangelical Lutheran Church	--	87,541	
India	South Andhra Lutheran Church	--	60,000	
India	Tamil Evangelical Lutheran Church	--	111,587	
Indonesia	Batak Christian Community Church	--	25,000	
Indonesia	Christian Communion of Indonesia Church in Nias (Gereja AMIN)	--	18,500	
Indonesia	Christian Protestant Angkola Church	--	29,455	
Indonesia	Christian Protestant Church in Indonesia	--	258,914	
Indonesia	Communion of Protestant Christian Church	--	63,274	
Indonesia	Indonesian Christian Church	--	355,000	
Indonesia	Indonesian Christian Lutheran Church	--	17,305	
Indonesia	Pakpak Dairi Christian Protestant Church	--	39,428	
Indonesia	Protestant Christian Batak Church	1861	4,500,000	
Indonesia	Protestant Christian Church	--	456,802	
Indonesia	Protestant Christian Church in Mentawai	--	50,000	
Indonesia	Simalungun Protestant Christian Church	--	220,586	
Indonesia	United Protestant Church	--	12,057	
Palestine	Evangelical Lutheran Church in Jordan and the Holy Land	1959	3,000	
Italy	Evangelical Lutheran Church in Italy	1949	7,000	
Japan	Japan Evangelical Lutheran Church	1946	22,000	
Japan	Japan Lutheran Church	1968	2,381	
Japan	Kinki Evangelical Lutheran Church	--	2,757	
Kenya	Evangelical Lutheran Church in Kenya	1948	100,000	
Kenya	Kenya Evangelical Lutheran Church	--	44,000	
Latvia	Evangelical Lutheran Church of Latvia	--	250,000	
Latvia	Latvian Evangelical Lutheran Church Abroad	--	22,172	
Liberia	Lutheran Church in Liberia	--	70,000	
Lithuania	Evangelical Lutheran Church of Lithuania	--	20,000	
Madagascar	Malagasy Lutheran Church	--	3,000,000	
Malawi	Evangelical Lutheran Church in Malawi	--	102,000	
Malaysia	Basel Christian Church of Malaysia	1925	63,000	
Malaysia	Evangelical Lutheran Church in Malaysia	1994	4,145	
Malaysia	Lutheran Church in Malaysia	1962	8,822	
Malaysia	Protestant Church in Sabah	--	52,000	
Mexico	Mexican Lutheran Church	--	1,500	
Mozambique	Evangelical Lutheran Church in Mozambique	--	12,606	
Namibia	Evangelical Lutheran Church in Namibia (ELCIN-GELC)	1960	4,434	
Namibia	Evangelical Lutheran Church in the Republic of Namibia	--	420,000	
Namibia	Evangelical Lutheran Church in Namibia (ELCIN)	--	772,398	
Nepal	Nepal Evangelical Lutheran Church	--	1,196	
Netherlands	Protestant Church in the Netherlands	2004	1,969,755	
Nicaragua	Nicaraguan Lutheran Church of Faith and Hope	--	7,050	
Nigeria	The Lutheran Church of Christ in Nigeria	--	2,200,000	
Nigeria	Lutheran Church of Nigeria	1936	121,000	
Norway	Church of Norway	--	3,526,133	
Norway	Evangelical Lutheran Free Church of Norway	--	21,490	
Papua New Guinea	Evangelical Lutheran Church of Papua New Guinea	--	1,200,000	
Papua New Guinea	Gutnius Lutheran Church	--	149,869	
Peru	Lutheran Church of Peru	--	496	
Philippines	Lutheran Church in the Philippines	1971	55,000	
Poland	Evangelical Church of the Augsburg Confession in Poland	c. 1570	71,000	
Republic of the Congo	Evangelical Lutheran Church of Congo	--	3,612	
Romania	Evangelical Church of the Augsburg Confession in Romania	1550	12,347	
Romania	Evangelical Lutheran Church in Romania	--	27,540	
Russia	Federation of Evangelical Lutheran Churches in Russia and Other States	2011	24,050	
Russia	Evangelical Lutheran Church of Ingria in Russia	--	15,000	
Rwanda	Lutheran Church of Rwanda	--	6,372	
Senegal	The Lutheran Church of Senegal	--	4,053	
Serbia	Slovak Evangelical Church of the Augsburg Confession in Serbia	--	49,000	
Sierra Leone	Evangelical Lutheran Church in Sierra Leone	1988	5,000	
Singapore	Lutheran Church in Singapore	1997	2,964	
Slovakia	Evangelical Church of the Augsburg Confession in the Slovak Republic	--	224,581	
Slovenia	Evangelical Church of the Augsburg Confession in Slovenia	--	20,000	
South Africa	Evangelical Lutheran Church in Southern Africa	1975	580,000	
South Africa	Evangelical Lutheran Church in Southern Africa (Cape Church)	--	3,994	
South Africa	Evangelical Lutheran Church in Southern Africa (N-T)	1981	9,656	
South Africa	Moravian Church in South Africa	--	50,000	
South Korea	Lutheran Church in Korea	1971	4,824	
Sri Lanka	Lanka Lutheran Church	--	5,324	
Suriname	Evangelical Lutheran Church in Suriname	--	4,000	
Sweden	Church of Sweden	--	5,563,351	
Switzerland	Federation of Evangelical Lutheran Churches in Switzerland and the Principality of Liechtenstein	--	4,968	
Taiwan	Lutheran Church of Taiwan (Republic of China)	--	1,949	
Taiwan	Lutheran Church of the Republic of China	--	580	
Taiwan	Taiwan Lutheran Church	--	10,481	
Tanzania	Evangelical Lutheran Church in Tanzania	--	6,531,336	
Thailand	Evangelical Lutheran Church in Thailand	--	4,766	
United Kingdom	Lutheran Church in Great Britain	--	1,500	
United States	Evangelical Lutheran Church in America	1988	3,765,362	
Venezuela	Evangelical Lutheran Church in Venezuela	--	1,950	
Zambia	Evangelical Lutheran Church in Zambia	--	4,000	
Zimbabwe	Evangelical Lutheran Church in Zimbabwe	1962	292,880	

== International Lutheran Council ==
Founded in 1993, the International Lutheran Council (ILC) is the second largest international association of Lutheran churches after the LWF, representing 7.15 million Lutherans in 54 church bodies as of 2018. Unlike the members of the LWF, not all members of the ILC are in altar and pulpit fellowship with one another.

Country	Church body	Year founded	Members	Ref
Argentina	Evangelical Lutheran Church of Argentina	1905	27,890	
Australia	Lutheran Church of Australia	1966	60,000	
Belgium	Evangelical Lutheran Church in Belgium	--	150	
Bolivia	Christian Evangelical Lutheran Church of Bolivia	--	906	
Brazil	Evangelical Lutheran Church of Brazil	1904	243,520	
Canada	Lutheran Church—Canada	1988	58,216	
Chile	Confessional Lutheran Church of Chile	1992	135	
Denmark	Evangelical Lutheran Free Church in Denmark	1855	90	
Finland	Evangelical Lutheran Mission Diocese of Finland	2013	2,313	
France	Evangelical Lutheran Church - Synod of France	1927	821	
Germany	Independent Evangelical Lutheran Church	1888	33,474	
Ghana	Evangelical Lutheran Church of Ghana	1958	29,000	
Guatemala	Lutheran Church in Guatemala	--	4,200	
Haiti	Evangelical Lutheran Church of Haiti	--	10,000	
Hong Kong	Lutheran Church-Hong Kong Synod	--	12,355	
India	India Evangelical Lutheran Church	1958	125,000	
Japan	Japan Lutheran Church	1968	2,381	
Kenya	Evangelical Lutheran Church in Kenya	1948	100,000	
Mexico	Lutheran Synod of Mexico	--	1,211	
Nicaragua	Lutheran Church Synod of Nicaragua	2008	1,800	
Nigeria	Lutheran Church of Nigeria	1936	121,000	
Norway	The Lutheran Church in Norway	2005	90	
Papua New Guinea	Gutnius Lutheran Church	--	149,869	
Paraguay	Evangelical Lutheran Church of Paraguay	1983	4,079	
Peru	Evangelical Lutheran Church - Peru	--	500	
Philippines	Lutheran Church in the Philippines	1971	55,000	
Portugal	Portuguese Evangelical Lutheran Church	1959	95	
Russia	Evangelical Lutheran Church of Ingria in Russia	--	15,000	
Russia	Siberian Evangelical Lutheran Church	2003	2,100	
South Africa	Free Evangelical Lutheran Synod in South Africa	1892	2,829	
South Africa	Lutheran Church in Southern Africa	1967	20,000	
South Korea	Lutheran Church in Korea	1971	4,824	
Spain	Evangelical Lutheran Church of Spain	2004	--	
Sri Lanka	Ceylon Evangelical Lutheran Church	--	5,324	
Taiwan	China Evangelical Lutheran Church	--	2,010	
United Kingdom	Evangelical Lutheran Church of England	1954	1,600	
United States	American Association of Lutheran Churches	1987	14,000	
United States	Lutheran Church—Missouri Synod	1847	2,017,834	
United States	Lutheran Ministerium and Synod – USA	1995	--	
Venezuela	Lutheran Church of Venezuela	--	1,607	

== Confessional Evangelical Lutheran Conference ==
The Confessional Evangelical Lutheran Conference (CELC) is the third major international association of Lutheran church bodies, representing approximately 500,000 Lutherans in 32 church bodies.

Country	Church body	Year founded	Members	Ref
Australia	Evangelical Lutheran Synod of Australia	--	--	
Bulgaria	Bulgarian Lutheran Church	1994	310	
Cameroon	Lutheran Church of Cameroon	--	650	
Czech Republic	Czech Evangelical Lutheran Church	1991	249	
Finland	Lutheran Confessional Church (Finland)	2002	26	
Germany	Evangelical Lutheran Free Church (Germany)	1876	1,300	
Indonesia	Gereja Lutheran Indonesia	--	1,362	
Japan	Lutheran Evangelical Christian Church	1962	375	
Latvia	Confessional Lutheran Church in Latvia	1999	300	
Malawi	Lutheran Church of Central Africa Malawi Conference	1963	41,000	
Mexico	Confessional Evangelical Lutheran Church (Mexico)	--	650	
Nigeria	All Saints Lutheran Church of Nigeria	1991	1,674	
Nigeria	Christ the King Lutheran Church—Nigeria	1969	3,727	
Norway	Lutheran Confessional Church (Norway)	2009	57	
Peru	Evangelical Lutheran Synod of Peru	--	970	
Puerto Rico	Evangelical Lutheran Confessional Church—Puerto Rico	1990	216	
Russia	Evangelical Lutheran Church "Concord"	1995	--	
Sweden	Lutheran Confessional Church (Sweden)	1974	220	
Ukraine	Ukrainian Lutheran Church	1996	2,500	
United States	Evangelical Lutheran Synod	1918	19,000	
United States	Wisconsin Evangelical Lutheran Synod	1850	363,997	
Zambia	Lutheran Church of Central Africa Zambia Conference	1955	10,000	

== Global Confessional and Missional Lutheran Forum ==
The Global Confessional and Missional Lutheran Forum (Global Forum) is the fourth major international association of Lutheran church bodies and organizations, representing Lutherans in church bodies across 15 nations.

Country	Church body	Year founded	Members	Ref
Bolivia	Christian Evangelical Lutheran Church of Bolivia	--	906	
Denmark	Evangelical Lutheran Network	2006	--	
Denmark	Lutheran Mission	1868	10,000	
Ethiopia	Ethiopian Evangelical Church Mekane Yesus	1959	8,310,129	
Germany	Church Coalition for the Bible and Confession	1967	--	
Germany	International Christian Network	1970	--	
India	Christu Suda Communications and Ministries	2001	--	
Indonesia	Indonesian Lutheran Christian Church	1965	17,305	
Kenya	Evangelical Lutheran Church in Kenya	1948	100,000	
Mongolia	Mongolian Evangelical Lutheran Church	--	--	
Norway	Norwegian Lutheran Mission	1891	50,000	
Norway	Inner Mission Federation	1898	--	
Peru	Evangelical Lutheran Church - Peru	1978	500	
South Sudan	Lutheran Church of South Sudan	2011	6,463	
Sweden	Mission Province	2003	--	
Tanzania	Evangelical Lutheran Church in Tanzania	1963	6,531,336	
Canada and the United States	North American Lutheran Church	2010	142,000	

== Unaffiliated Lutheran denominations ==
The following denominations are not members of the LWF, ILC, CELC or Global Forum, though several of them work with or are in fellowship with individual members of those associations. In addition, a number of these denominations have fellowship agreements with one another, without being part of any larger association. Note that several of these denominations have congregations in multiple countries. In such cases, the denomination is listed under the country in which its headquarters is located.

Country	Church body	Year founded	Members	Ref
Angola	Confessional Lutheran Church in Angola (Note: Mission partner of the LCMS, LCC, or another ILC-affiliated denomination)	--	--	
Australia	Australian Evangelical Lutheran Church	1992	--	
Australia	Evangelical Lutheran Congregations of the Reformation	1966	--	
Benin	Evangelical Lutheran Church of Benin	1997	--	
Burundi	Evangelical Lutheran Church in Burundi	1997	1,800	
Cambodia	Cambodia Lutheran Church	2017	1,000	
Canada	Canadian Association of Lutheran Congregations	1991	--	
Canada	Church of the Lutheran Brethren Canada	--	--	
Chad	Church of the Lutheran Brethren of Chad	--	113,684	
China	China Lutheran Gospel Church	--	225	
Czech Republic	Evangelical Church of the Augsburg Confession in the Czech Republic	--	--	
Democratic Republic of the Congo	Evangelical Lutheran Church of East Congo	1977	10,000	
Denmark	Confessional Orthodox Evangelical Lutheran Communion	2019	--	
Eritrea	Evangelical Church of Eritrea	--	--	
Estonia	Estonian Lutheran Association of Peace	1997	--	
Ethiopia	Lutheran Church of Ethiopia	--	20,000	
Faroe Islands	Evangelical Lutheran Church on the Faroe Islands	2007	40,234	
Finland	Confessional Lutheran Church of Finland	1928	318	
Finland	The Union of Independent Evangelical Lutheran Congregations in Finland	1928	482	
Ghana	Apostolic Lutheran Church of Ghana (Note: Laestadian)	1995	500	
Guam	Lutheran Church of Guam	2011	--	
Guinea	Evangelical Lutheran Church in Guinea	1996	3,000	
India	Good Samaritan Evangelical Lutheran Church	--	57,635	
India	Gospel Outreach Ministries	1992	--	
India	Latvian Evangelical Lutheran Church in Tamil Nadu	1981	--	
India	Lutheran Fellowship of India	1998	--	
India	North Western Gossner Evangelical Lutheran Church	--	118,283	
Ireland	Lutheran Church in Ireland	1962	5,623	
Ivory Coast	Evangelical Lutheran Church–Ivory Coast Synod	--	1,500	
Japan	Fellowship Deaconry Evangelical Church	--	--	
Japan	Japan Lutheran Brethren Church	--	1,263	
Japan	West Japan Evangelical Lutheran Church	--	3,933	
Kazakhstan	Evangelical Lutheran Church in Kazakhstan	--	--	
Kenya	Evangelical Lutheran Fellowship of Africa	--	--	
Kyrgyzstan	Concordia Lutheran Church	2001	600	
Liberia	Apostolic Lutheran Church of Liberia	--	--	
Liberia	Evangelical Lutheran Church in Liberia	2009	11,000	
Moldova	Evangelical Lutheran Church in the Republic of Moldova	1999	--	
Mozambique	Lutheran Church of Concord in Mozambique	--	1,600	
Myanmar	Apostolic Lutheran Church of Myanmar	--	--	
New Zealand	Evangelical Lutheran Church of New Zealand	2018	--	
Nigeria	Fellowship of Lutheran Congregations – Nigeria	--	--	
Panama	Brotherhood of Popular Pastoral Action - Lutheran Coordination	--	--	
Panama	Evangelical Lutheran Church of Panama	--	200	
Philippines	Tagakaulo Lutheran Church of Christ in the Philippines	1998	--	
Russia	Evangelical Lutheran Church of Augsburg Confession in Russia (Note: Evangelical Catholic)	2006	--	
South Africa	United Lutheran Church in South Africa	1997	--	
Sudan	Evangelical Lutheran Church in Sudan and South Sudan (Note: Formerly known as the Evangelical Lutheran Church of Sudan)	1993	20,000	
Serbia	Evangelical Christian Church of Augsburg Confession in Serbia	1998	10000	^{[302]}
Sweden	Concordia Lutheran Church	1984	--	
Sweden	Evangelical Lutheran Church in Sweden	1968	--	
Taiwan	Church of the Lutheran Brethren of Taiwan	--	--	
Tanzania	Lutheran Church in East Africa	--	10,000	
Thailand	Thailand Concordia Lutheran Church	2004	600	
The Gambia	Evangelical Lutheran Church of The Gambia	1999	2,000	
Togo	Evangelical Lutheran Church of Christ – Togo	--	--	
Togo	Lutheran Church of Togo	2009	5,000	
Turkey	Istanbul Lutheran Church	2005	--	
Uganda	Lutheran Church Mission in Uganda	1994	25,000	
Uganda	Uganda Lutheran Church Foundation	--	9,084	
United States	Apostolic Lutheran Church of America	1928	9,000	
United States	Association of Confessional Lutheran Churches	2007	--	
United States	Association of Free Lutheran Congregations	1962	44,500	
United States	Association of independent evangelical Lutheran churches	--	--	
United States	Augsburg Lutheran Churches	2001	--	
United States	Church of the Lutheran Brethren of America	1900	8,860	
United States	Church of the Lutheran Confession	1960	8,108	
United States	Concordia Lutheran Conference	1956	--	
United States	Conservative Lutheran Association	1980	1,267	
United States	Evangelical Lutheran Church Estonian Synod	2010	--	
United States	Evangelical Lutheran Conference & Ministerium of North America	1999	--	
United States	Evangelical Lutheran Diocese of North America	2006	--	
United States	General Lutheran Church	2014	^{[302]}	
United States	Illinois Lutheran Conference	1979	--	
United States	Independent Lutheran Diocese	2008	--	
United States	Laestadian Lutheran Church	1973	--	
United States	Latvian Evangelical Lutheran Church in America	1957	10,950	
United States	Lutheran Church - International	1967	1000	
United States	Lutheran Churches of the Reformation	1964	1,300	
United States	Lutheran Congregations in Mission for Christ	2001	300,000	
United States	Lutheran Conference of Confessional Fellowship	1983	--	
United States	The Lutheran Evangelical Protestant Church	2001	--	
United States	Lutheran Ministerium and Synod - USA	1995	--	
United States	Lutheran Orthodox Church	--	--	
United States	Missionary Lutheran Church	2013	--	
United States	Old Apostolic Lutheran Church of America	1899	25,000	
United States	Orthodox Lutheran Confessional Conference	2006	--	
United States	Protes'tant Conference	1927	1000	
United States	United Lutheran Mission Association	2005	--	
Zambia	Lutheran Evangelical Church in Africa—Zambia Diocese	--	--	

== See also ==
- List of Lutheran dioceses and archdioceses
- List of Lutheran denominations in North America
