= List of ELCA synods =

A map of the nine ELCA regions. Note that the Slovak Zion Synod falls under Region 7 and the Bahamas and the Caribbean under Region 9.

The Evangelical Lutheran Church in America (ELCA) consists of 65 synods which are configured into nine regional offices. Each of the synods of the ELCA elects one bishop and three synod council officers (vice president, secretary, and treasurer) at its Synod Assembly to oversee the spiritual and organizational activities of its member congregations and elect representatives to the ELCA's churchwide assembly which is in turn led by the presiding bishop. Each synod also has companion relationships with one or more international Lutheran church bodies.

Though synods mostly follow geographical lines, the Slovak Zion Synod is non-geographic and has congregations in multiple U.S. states as well as one in Canada.

== Region 1 (Northwestern United States) ==
Synod name	Area	Bishop	Membership	Congregations	Companion churches
Alaska Synod	Alaska	Timothy Oslovich	7,806	30	none
Northwest Washington Synod	Northwest Washington	Shelley Bryan Wee	29,340	98	Russia (ELCROS)
Southwestern Washington Synod	Southwest Washington	Richard E. Jaech	23,365	84	Namibia (ELCIN, ELCRN, DELK)
Northwest Intermountain Synod	Eastern Washington, Idaho	Meggan Manlove	18,704	89	Tanzania (ELCT: Ulanga Kilombero)
Oregon Synod	Oregon	Laurie A. Larson Caesar	26,252	109	Poland (ECACRP)
Montana Synod^{[d]}	Montana	Laurie A. Jungling	28,667	123	Bolivia (IELB) South Africa (ELCSA: Cape Orange Diocese)
Totals			134,134	533	

== Region 2 (Southwestern US and Wyoming) ==
Synod name	Area	Bishop	Membership	Congregations	Companion churches
Sierra Pacific Synod	North & Central California, Northern Nevada	Jeff Johnson	34,286	180	El Salvador (ILS) Rwanda (LCR) Taiwan (TLC)
Southwest California Synod	Southwest California	Brenda Bos	20,888	114	El Salvador (ILS) Hong Kong (ELCHK)
Pacifica Synod^{[g]}	Inland Empire (CA), Hawaii	David C. Nagler	23,384	103	Malaysia (BCCM)
Grand Canyon Synod	Arizona, Southern Nevada	Deborah K. Hutterer	38,182	88	Senegal (ELS)
Rocky Mountain Synod^{[d]}	Colorado, New Mexico, Utah, Wyoming, West Texas	Meghan Johnston Aelabouni	49,652	154	Madagascar (FLM: 4 synods)
Totals			166,392	639	

== Region 3 (Minnesota and the Dakotas) ==
Synod name	Area	Bishop	Membership	Congregations	Companion churches
Western North Dakota Synod	Western North Dakota	Craig A. Schweitzer	54,946	169	Central African Republic (EELRCA)
Eastern North Dakota Synod	Eastern North Dakota	Tessa M. Leiseth	88,328	201	Central African Republic (EELRCA)
South Dakota Synod	South Dakota	Constanze Hagmaier	96,880	202	Cameroon (EELC) Nicaragua (ILFE)
Northwestern Minnesota Synod	Northwest Minnesota	Bill Tesch	82,479	221	India (AELC)
Northeastern Minnesota Synod	Northeast Minnesota	Amy Odgren	53,584	132	Honduras (ICLH) India (SALC) Russia (ELCIR)
Southwestern Minnesota Synod	Southwest Minnesota	Dee Pederson	102,163	232	South Africa (ELCSA: South Eastern Diocese)
Minneapolis Area Synod	Minneapolis (MN)	Jen Nagel	156,316	141	Germany (EKD: Saxony) Nigeria (LCCN)
Saint Paul Area Synod	Saint Paul (MN)	Patricia J. Lull	102,414	105	Guatemala (ILAG) Tanzania (ELCT: Iringa Diocese)
Southeastern Minnesota Synod	Southeast Minnesota	Regina Hassanally	108,067	166	Colombia (IELCO) Tanzania (ELCT: Central Diocese) South Sudan (ELCAMSS)
Totals			845,177	1,569	

== Region 4 (Central United States) ==
Synod name	Area	Bishop	Membership	Congregations	Companion churches
Nebraska Synod	Nebraska	Scott Johnson	87,686	234	Argentina/Uruguay (IELU) Tanzania (ELCT: Northern Diocese)
Central States Synod^{[a]}	Kansas, Missouri	Donna Simon	41,541	165	Papua New Guinea (ELCPNG) Russia (ELCUSFE)
Arkansas-Oklahoma Synod	Arkansas, Oklahoma	Michael Girlinghouse	7,156	50	Great Britain (LCiGB) Tanzania (ELCT: Morogoro Diocese)
Northern Texas-Northern Louisiana Synod	North Texas, North Louisiana	Erik Gronberg	18,197	94	Sierra Leone (ELCSL)
Southwestern Texas Synod	Southwestern Texas	Susan Briner	31,507	123	Costa Rica (ILCO)
Texas-Louisiana Gulf Coast Synod	Texas Gulf Coast, South Louisiana	Michael W. Rinehart	30,345	104	Central African Republic (EELRCA) Peru (IELP)
Totals			216,432	770	

== Region 5 (Illinois, Iowa, Wisconsin, Upper Peninsula) ==
Synod name	Area	Bishop	Membership	Congregations	Companion churches
Metropolitan Chicago Synod	Chicago (IL)	Wayne Miller	69,073	171	South Africa (ELCSA: Central Diocese)
Northern Illinois Synod	Northern Illinois	Stacie Fidlar	57,139	143	India (Acrot) Tanzania (ELCT: North Central Diocese)
Central/Southern Illinois Synod	Central & Southern Illinois	S. John Roth	34,956	121	Madagascar (FLM: 2 synods)
Southeastern Iowa Synod	Southeast Iowa	Amy Current	79,208	136	Tanzania (ELCT: Pare and Mwanga dioceses)
Western Iowa Synod	Western Iowa	Scott Dalen	42,754	121	Chile (IELCH) Tanzania (ELCT: North Southern Diocese)
Northeastern Iowa Synod	Northeastern Iowa	Kevin T. Jones	63,259	145	Hungary (ELCH) Namibia (ELCIN, ELCRN, DELK)
Northern Great Lakes Synod	Upper Michigan	Katherine Finegan	21,487	79	Tanzania (ELCT: Eastern & Coastal Diocese)
Northwest Synod of Wisconsin^{[b]}	Northwest Wisconsin	Martin R. Halom	77,924	195	Malawi (ELCM)
East-Central Synod of Wisconsin^{[b]}	Eastern Wisconsin	Ann Edison-Albright	64,208	118	South Africa (ELCSA: Western Diocese)
Greater Milwaukee Synod	Milwaukee (WI)	Paul Erickson	59,143	119	El Salvador (ILS) Tanzania (ELCT: Meru Diocese)
South-Central Synod of Wisconsin^{[b]}	Southern Wisconsin	Joy Mortensen-Wiebe	81,011	133	India (NELC)
La Crosse Area Synod	La Crosse (WI)	Felix Malpica	29,513	72	Czechia (ECCB) Peru (IELP)
Totals			679,675	1,553	

== Region 6 (Indiana, Kentucky, Ohio, Lower Peninsula) ==
Synod name	Area	Bishop	Membership	Congregations	Companion churches
Southeast Michigan Synod	Southeast Michigan	Donald P. Kreiss	34,448	106	Jordan/Palestine (ELCJHL) Tanzania (ELCT: Mbulu Diocese)
North/West Lower Michigan Synod	North & West Michigan	Craig A. Satterlee	30,565	109	Honduras (ICLH) Latvia (LELB) Papua New Guinea (ELCPNG)
Indiana-Kentucky Synod	Indiana, Kentucky	Timothy M. Graham	43,760	176	Chile (IELCH) Indonesia (HKBP)
Northwestern Ohio Synod	Northwest Ohio	Daniel G. Beaudoin	62,108	160	Serbia (SECACS) Tanzania (ELCT: Dodoma Diocese)
Northeastern Ohio Synod	Northeast Ohio	Laura Barbins	44,966	164	South Africa (ELCSA: Northern Diocese)
Southern Ohio Synod	Southern Ohio	Suzanne D. Dillahunt	56,262	180	Brazil (IECLB) Germany (EKD: Northern Germany) Kazakhstan (ELCRK) Tanzania (ELCT: North West Diocese)
Totals			272,109	895	

== Region 7 (New England, New Jersey, New York, Eastern PA) ==
Synod name	Area	Bishop	Membership	Congregations	Companion churches
New Jersey Synod	New Jersey	Tracie Bartholomew	44,875	156	Namibia (ELCIN, ELCRN, DELK)
New England Synod	New England, Northeast New York	Nathan D. Pipho	38,163	172	Honduras (ICLH) Jordan/Palestine (ELCJHL)
Metropolitan New York Synod	New York City, Hudson Valley, & Long Island	Katrina Foster	54,403	187	Tanzania (ELCT: North West Diocese)
Upstate New York Synod	Upstate New York	Lee M. Miller, II	43,888	161	Zambia (ELCZa) Zimbabwe (ELCZ)
Northeastern Pennsylvania Synod	Northeast Pennsylvania	Jennifer Dee	99,369	254	Argentina/Uruguay (IELU) Germany (EKD: Saxony) Slovenia (ECACS) Tanzania (ELCT: South Central Diocese)
Southeastern Pennsylvania Synod	Southeast Pennsylvania	Bryan J. Penman	59,786	148	Tanzania (ELCT: North Eastern Diocese)
Slovak Zion Synod^{[c]}	Slovak heritage (non-geographic)	Wilma S. Kucharek	2,916	20	Serbia (SECACS) Slovakia (ECACSR)
Totals			343,400	1,098	

== Region 8 (Delaware, Maryland, West Virginia, Western PA) ==
Synod name	Area	Bishop	Membership	Congregations	Companion churches
Northwestern Pennsylvania Synod	Northwest Pennsylvania	Michael Lozano	16,892	75	Germany (EKD: Central Germany) Tanzania (ELCT: North Eastern Diocese)
Southwestern Pennsylvania Synod	Southwest Pennsylvania	Kurt F. Kusserow	54,163	157	Madagascar (FLM, Tulear Synod)
Allegheny Synod	Allegheny Region (PA)	Paula J. Schmitt	27,130	114	Kenya (KELC)
Lower Susquehanna Synod	Lower Susquehanna (PA)	Stephen R. Herr	73,915	225	Tanzania (ELCT: Tulear Diocese)
Upper Susquehanna Synod	Upper Susquehanna (PA)	Craig A. Miller	25,571	119	Germany (EKD: Bavaria) Liberia (LCL)
Delaware-Maryland Synod^{[e]}	Delaware, Maryland	William J. Gohl, Jr	49,897	160	Estonia (EELK) Finland (ELCF) Tanzania (ELCT: Mara Diocese)
Metropolitan Washington, D.C. Synod	Washington, D.C. Southern Maryland, Northeast Virginia	Philip C. Hirsch	24,834	72	Namibia (ELCIN, ELCRN, DELK) El Salvador (ILS) Slovakia (ECACSR)
West Virginia-Western Maryland Synod	West Virginia-Western Maryland	Matthew L. Riegel	9,501	59	Madagascar (FLM: Betioky Atsimo Synod)
Totals			281,901	981	

== Region 9 (Southeastern US, the Caribbean) ==
Synod name	Area	Bishop	Membership	Congregations	Companion churches
Virginia Synod^{[e]}	Virginia	Phyllis Milton	30,212	151	Papua New Guinea (ELCPNG)
North Carolina Synod	North Carolina	Emily Kuhn Hartner	50,501	187	Costa Rica (ILCO) Papua New Guinea (ELCPNG)
South Carolina Synod	South Carolina	Virginia S. Aebischer	40,105	147	Colombia (IELCO) Japan (JELC) Tanzania (ELCT: South West Diocese)
Southeastern Synod	Alabama, Georgia, Mississippi, Tennessee	Kevin L. Strickland	35,062	139	Germany (EKD: Bavaria) Guatemala (ILAG) Malaysia (BCCM) Singapore (LCS)
Florida-Bahamas Synod	Florida, The Bahamas	Pedro M. Suarez	43,302	166	Cuba (IEU-SL) Guyana (ELCG) Haiti (ELH) Suriname (ELKS) Jamaica (UTCWI)
Caribbean Synod^{[f]}	Caribbean	Vivian J. Davila	3,538	33	South Africa (ELCSA: Eastern Diocese)
Totals			202,720	823	

== Notes ==
- ^{a} Name is formatted this way to avoid confusion with the Lutheran Church–Missouri Synod.
- ^{b} Name is formatted this way to avoid confusion with the Wisconsin Evangelical Lutheran Synod.
- ^{c} Synod is non-geographic, consisting of congregations of Slovak heritage.
- ^{d} Some congregations in Northwestern Wyoming have elected to be a part of the Montana Synod instead.
- ^{e} Excludes regions part of the Washington metropolitan area
- ^{f} Most member congregations of the Synod are located in Puerto Rico but also has members in Bermuda and the US Virgin Islands.
- ^{g} Not to be confused with Pacifica, California
