= Evangelical Lutheran Church =

Evangelical Lutheran Church can refer to many different Lutheran churches in the world. Among them are the following:

== North America ==
- Evangelical Lutheran Church in America, the largest Lutheran denomination in the United States
- Evangelical Lutheran Church (1917), merged into the American Lutheran Church (a predecessor to the ELCA) in 1960
- Evangelical Lutheran Church (Frederick, Maryland), a congregation
- Evangelical Lutheran Church in Canada

== Germany ==
Lutheran regional churches of the Evangelical Church in Germany:

- Evangelical Lutheran Church in Bavaria
- Evangelical Lutheran Church in Brunswick
- Evangelical-Lutheran Church of Hanover
- Evangelical Lutheran Church in Oldenburg
- Evangelical-Lutheran Church of Saxony
- Evangelical Lutheran Church of Schaumburg-Lippe
- Evangelical-Lutheran Church in Württemberg
- Evangelical Lutheran Church in Thuringia, joined a merger in 2009 to form the Evangelical Church in Central Germany, a United church Evangelical Lutheran Church in Northern Germany, formed in 2012 by a merger of the following Lutheran churches:
  - Evangelical Lutheran Church of Mecklenburg
  - North Elbian Evangelical Lutheran Church

Other German Lutheran churches:

- Evangelical Lutheran Free Church (Germany)
- Independent Evangelical-Lutheran Church

== Europe ==
- Church of Denmark, Evangelical Lutheran Church in Denmark
- Evangelical Lutheran Church of England
- Estonian Evangelical Lutheran Church
- Church of the Faroe Islands
- Evangelical Lutheran Church of Finland
- Evangelical Lutheran Church in France
- Evangelical Lutheran Church – Synod of France and Belgium
- Church of Iceland, Evangelical Lutheran Church of Iceland
- Evangelical Lutheran Church of Latvia (present also outside Europe)
- Latvian Evangelical Lutheran Church Abroad
- Evangelical Lutheran Church in Lithuania
- Evangelical Lutheran Church in the Republic of Moldova
- Evangelical Lutheran Church in the Kingdom of the Netherlands
- Church of Norway, Evangelical Lutheran Church of Norway
- Evangelical Lutheran Church in Russia and Other States
- Evangelical Lutheran Church of Ingria
- Evangelical Lutheran Church of the Augsburg Confession, Kisač, Serbia
- Church of Sweden, Evangelical Lutheran Church of Sweden

== South America ==
- Evangelical Lutheran Church of Argentina
- Evangelical Lutheran Church of Brazil
- Evangelical Lutheran Church in Chile
- Evangelical Lutheran Church of Colombia
- Evangelical Lutheran Church in Ecuador
- Evangelical Lutheran Church in Guyana
- Evangelical Lutheran Church in Suriname
- Evangelical Lutheran Church in Venezuela

== Elsewhere ==
- Evangelical Lutheran Church in Australia, merged to form the Lutheran Church of Australia
- United Evangelical Lutheran Church of Australia, merged to form the Lutheran Church of Australia
- Evangelical Lutheran Church of Ghana
- Evangelical Lutheran Church of Hong Kong
- Andhra Evangelical Lutheran Church in Andhra Pradesh, India
- Tamil Evangelical Lutheran Church, Tamil Nadu, India
- Evangelical Lutheran Church in Jordan and the Holy Land
- Evangelical Lutheran Church of Papua New Guinea
- Evangelical Lutheran Church in Southern Africa
- Evangelical Lutheran Church in Tanzania

== Global communions ==
- Lutheran World Federation
- International Lutheran Council
- Confessional Evangelical Lutheran Conference
- Global Confessional and Missional Lutheran Forum

== See also ==
- Evangelisch-lutherische Kirche (disambiguation)
- Evangelical Church of the Augsburg Confession (disambiguation)
- List of Lutheran churches
- List of Lutheran denominations
