= Patricia Lull =

Bishop

The Reverend Patricia J Lull
- Bishop of the Saint Paul Area Synod of the ELCA
- Elected: 2014, 2020
- Predecessor: Rev. Peter Rogness
- Other posts: Pastor at St. Paul American Lutheran Church; Pastor at Christ Lutheran Church; National Director for Lutheran Campus Ministry for the ELCA

Orders
- Ordination: 1979

Personal details
- Born: 1953/4 Fremont, Ohio
- Denomination: Lutheran
- Occupation: Bishop
- Education: College of Wooster; Yale Divinity School

Patricia Lull is a Bishop in the Evangelical Lutheran Church of America (ELCA) for the Saint Paul Area Synod. She is the first woman to hold the position.

== Ministry ==
Lull was ordained as a pastor in 1979. She began her ministry at St. Paul American Lutheran Church in Alpena, Michigan where she served as associate pastor from 1979 until 1984. In 1984, she moved churches to Christ Lutheran Church in Athens, Ohio, where she would remain until 1999. She served as National Director for Lutheran Campus Ministry for the ELCA from 1999-2001. She moved to Minnesota After being called to serve as dean of students at Luther Seminary, where she would serve from 2001-2010. She later served as executive director of the St. Paul Area Council of Churches from 2011-2014. While in that position, Lull was a leader in the Interfaith Youth Leadership Coalition (IYLC) alongside Fardosa Hassan.

== Time as Bishop ==
She was elected Bishop of the Saint Paul Area Synod on May 14, 2014, on the fifth ballot. She took office on July 1, 2014. She was one of seven candidates. She was re-elected on September 25, 2020, this time on the first ballot.

Lull serves as co-chair form the Lutheran-Catholic Dialogue in the United States. Lull served as an author of the ELCA’s Inter-Religious Policy Statement, adopted in 2019. In 2023, she was made an Ex officio member of the Augsburg University Board of Regents.

Lull joined multiple other bishops, including Jen Nagel and Regina Hassanally in condemning Operation Metro Surge.

== See also ==
- List of ELCA synods
- Timeline of women's ordination
