= Caribbean Conference of Churches =

The Caribbean Conference of Churches is a regional ecumenical body with 33 member churches in 34 territories across the Dutch, English, French and Spanish speaking territories of the Caribbean. It was founded in 1973 and is based in Port-of-Spain, Trinidad.

The CCC grew out of the work of the Christian Action for Development in the Caribbean (CADEC) and the Action for the Renewal of the Churches (ARC).

Member churches and organizations are made of Christians from the Catholic, Protestant and Ethiopian Orthodox Tewahedo Church (Archdiocese of the Caribbean and Latin America) denominations.

== Member Churches ==
- The Antilles Episcopal Conference (Catholic) - Regional
- African Methodist Episcopal (AME)
- Assemblea Nacional Presbyteriana de Cuba
- Eglise De Dieu (Ebenezer) - Haiti
- Ejercito de Salvacion - Cuba
- Evangelical Lutheran Church in America - Caribbean Synod
- Evangelical Lutheran Church in Suriname
- Fraternidad Bautista - Cuba
- Iglesia Cristiana Pentecostal - Cuba
- Iglesia Episcopal de Cuba
- Iglesia Episcopal Dominicana
- Iglesia Evangelica Dominicana
- Iglesia Metodista Unida de Puerto Rico
- Iglesia Metodista de Cuba
- Iglesia Reformada Unida de Cuba
- Maronite Church - Dominica
- Presbytery of Guyana
- Maronite Church - Guyana
- Salvadoran Lutheran Church
- The Church in the Province of the West Indies (Anglican)
- The Congregational Union of Guyana
- The Ethiopian Orthodox Church - Regional
- The Jamaica Baptist Union
- The Lutheran Church in Guyana
- The Methodist Church in the Caribbean and the Americas
- The Moravian Church - East West Indies Province
- The Moravian Church - Jamaica
- The Moravian Church - Suriname
- The Moravian Church - Guyana
- The Presbyterian Church of Trinidad and Tobago
- The Presbyterian Church of Guyana
- The Presbyterian Church in Grenada
- The Reformed Church - Suriname
- The Salvation Army
- The United Church of Jamaica & Grand Cayman
- The United Protestant Church of Curaçao
