= St David's, Cardiff (disambiguation) =

St David's, Cardiff is a shopping centre in Cardiff city centre.

Saint David's, Cardiff or St David's, Cardiff may also refer to:

== Buildings ==
- St David's Hall, a concert hall in Cardiff city centre
- St David's Hospital, Cardiff, a hospital in Riverside, west of the city centre
- Voco St David's Cardiff Hotel, a 5-star hotel in Cardiff Bay

=== Churches ===
- Cardiff Metropolitan Cathedral, also known as St David's Cathedral Cardiff, the Roman Catholic cathedral
- Eglwys Dewi Sant, Cardiff, a church now dedicated to St David, in St Andrew's Crescent
- St David's Church, Fairwater
