= Evangelical Church of the Augsburg Confession =

The Evangelical Church of the Augsburg Confession is the name of several Lutheran Denominations:

- Evangelical Church of the Augsburg Confession in Poland
- Evangelical Church of the Augsburg Confession in Romania
- Evangelical Church of the Augsburg Confession in Slovakia
- Evangelical Church of the Augsburg Confession in Slovenia
- Protestant Church of the Augsburg Confession of Alsace and Lorraine, France
- Protestant Church of the Augsburg Confession in Austria
- Silesian Evangelical Church of the Augsburg Confession, Czech Republic
- Slovak Evangelical Church of the Augsburg Confession in Serbia
- Slovak Evangelical Lutheran Church of the Augsburg Confession in the United States of America
- Ukrainian Lutheran Church, formerly the Evangelical Church of the Augsburg Confession in Ukraine

== See also ==
- List of Lutheran denominations
- Augsburg (disambiguation)
- Augsburg Confession
- Evangelical Church of the Lutheran Confession in Brazil
