= Stare Czaple, Pomeranian Voivodeship =

Stare Czaple
- Village
- Location within Poland
- Coordinates: 54°14′50″N 18°2′9″E
- Country: Poland
- Voivodeship: Pomeranian
- County: Kartuzy
- Gmina: Stężyca
- Population: 105

Stare Czaple [ˈstarɛ ˈt͡ʂaplɛ] is a village in the administrative district of Gmina Stężyca, within Kartuzy County, Pomeranian Voivodeship, in northern Poland.

For details of the history of the region, see History of Pomerania.

== Notable residents ==
- Adalbert Brunke (1912–2013), Bishop of the Evangelical Lutheran Church in Southern Africa
