= GELC =

GELC may refer to

- Curriki (previously known as the Global Education & Learning Community)
- German-speaking Evangelical Lutheran Church in Namibia
