= Fardosa Hassan =

- Born: 1989/1990; Somalia
- Education: Augsburg University
- Occupation: Chaplain

Fardosa Hassan (born 1989/1990) is a Sunni Muslim chaplain at Augsburg University. She is the first in that position.

== Biography ==
=== Early life ===
Hassan is a first-generation Somali-American. Her family fled the Somalian Civil War when she was one year old. Her early childhood was spent in Kenya. When sher was in elementary school, her family immigrated to Minnesota, living in the Cedar-Riverside neighborhood. She attended Washburn High School, graduating in 2008.

=== Education ===
While attending Augsburg University, she was a member of the Muslim Student Association. Hassan was an intern for Sophia Abdi Noor during her sophomore year at Augsburg. In 2011, she received the Courageous Woman Award, and was invited to the white house by Barack Obama. She graduated from Augsburg in 2012, with a degree in sociology and international relations. Hassan planned to enter into international humanitarian relief effort, but instead felt called to become a chaplain. She was hired as Augsburg's first muslim chaplain.

=== As chaplain ===
As chaplain, Hassan is a leader in the Interfaith Youth Leadership Coalition (IYLC), along with ELCA bishop Patricia Lull. She is an advocate for mental healthcare, and works with therapists and imams to fight against the idea that seeking treatment for mental illness, such as depression, is unislamic. Her role on campus has grown as the number of muslims attending Augsburg had as much as tripled between 2013 and 2016. By 2020, she was the IYLC coordinator for the Greater St. Paul area.
