= European Lutheran Conference =

Organisation of Confessional Lutheran churches

The European Lutheran Conference (ELC) is an association of Confessional Lutheran churches in Europe. The full members of the conference are in altar and pulpit fellowship with one another. The members of the ELC are also members of the International Lutheran Council.

== Member churches ==
The European Lutheran Conference includes the following Lutheran churches as full members:

- Evangelical Lutheran Church in Belgium (ELKB)
- Evangelical Lutheran Diocese in Norway (ELDiN)
- Evangelical Lutheran Free Church of Denmark (ELFKiDk)
- Evangelical Lutheran Church of England (ELCE)
- Evangelical Lutheran Church – Synod of France (EEL-SF)
- Independent Evangelical Lutheran Church (SELK) in Germany
- Portuguese Evangelical Lutheran Church (IELP)
- Spanish Evangelical Lutheran Church (IELE)

== Organization ==
The current officers are Chairman Klaus Pahlen of the SELK; Vice-chairman Leif Jensen of the ELFKiDk; and Secretary Claudio Flor of the ELCE. The 2018 Conference was in Hoddesdon, England.

== See also ==
- International Lutheran Council
- List of Lutheran denominations
