= Ann Svennungsen =

Former Lutheran bishop

The Reverend Ann M Svennungsen
- Bishop of the Minneapolis Area Synod of the ELCA
- Elected: 2012, 2018
- Predecessor: Glenn Nycklemoe
- Successor: Jen Nagel

Personal details
- Born: 1955 (age 70–71)
- Denomination: Lutheran
- Spouse: William Russell
- Children: 3
- Occupation: Bishop
- Education: Luther Seminary; Concordia College (Moorhead, Minnesota)

Ann M. Svennungsen (born 1955) is a former bishop in the Evangelical Lutheran Church of America (ELCA) for the Minneapolis Area Synod. She was the first woman to hold the position.

== Ministry ==
Svennungsen comes from a family of pastors, but was the first woman in her family to become a pastor. She served as senior pastor at Trinity Church in Moorhead, Minnesota. for twenty-two years. She was later the first woman to serve as President of Texas Lutheran University, beginning her tenure in 2007. Svennungsen served as interim pastor at St. Olaf College before being installed as bishop. During this time, she opposed 2012 Minnesota Amendment 1.

She was elected as bishop in 2012, and for a second term in 2018. As Bishop, Svennungsen was a vocal opponent of Christian Nationalism. She has also been an advocate for environmentalism. She left the office in 2024, after the election of Jen Nagel.

== Authorship ==
In 2005, Svennungsen wrote a book, Awakened to a Calling: Reflections on the Vocation of Ministry, with Presbyterian Melissa Wiginton. It is a collection of sermons by outgoing Fund for Theological Education President Dr. James Waits.

== See also ==
- List of ELCA synods
- Timeline of women's ordination
