= Council of Churches in Namibia =

- Founded: 1978

The Council of Churches in Namibia (CCN) is an ecumenical organisation in Namibia. Its member churches together represent 1.5 million people, 90% of the population of Namibia. It is a member of the Fellowship of Christian Councils in Southern Africa.

CCN has its roots in the Christian Centre, which established in 1975 "as an ecumenical meeting place for black workers in Windhoek." Its purpose was to "speak with a united voice against injustice on behalf of the voiceless; and to initiate relief projects for the poor," but its real goal was to establish the Council of Churches in Namibia, which happened in 1978. Prior to Namibian independence, the CCN spoke out against repression and racism in the apartheid regime, and was "particularly outspoken in its denunciation in South Africa's introduction of conscription for all young men in Namibia."

Since independence, the Council of Churches in Namibia has been involved in humanitarian activities such as helping political prisoners and addressing the issues of hunger and drought. CCN is an umbrella organisation, with all its member churches being autonomous and independent. It views itself as a "facilitating body" to create a "platform for dialogue on different issues."

== Membership ==
There were five founding members:

- African Methodist Episcopal Church (AME)
- Anglican Diocese of Namibia
- Evangelical Lutheran Church in Namibia (ELCIN)
- Methodist Church of Southern Africa (MCSA)
- Roman Catholic Church

Eight denominations have since joined the CCN:

- Dutch Reformed Church in Namibia
- Evangelical Lutheran Church in the Republic of Namibia
- German-speaking Evangelical Lutheran Church in Namibia (GELK)
- Protestant Unity Church
- Rhenish Church in Namibia
- United Congregational Church of Southern Africa
- United Methodist Church in Namibia
- Uniting Reformed Church in Southern Africa

The Coptic Orthodox Church is an associate member, while the Reformed Churches in South Africa, the Apostolic Faith Mission of Namibia, the Pentecostal Protestant Church, the Ecumenical Institute of Namibia, and the Young Women's Christian Association are observer members.
