= Evangelisch-lutherische Kirche =

Evangelisch-lutherische Kirche may refer to:

- any of the Lutheran churches in German-speaking countries, in particular those which are members of the Protestant Church in Germany
- the United Evangelical Lutheran Church of Germany, a subdivision of the former
- the Independent Evangelical-Lutheran Church, a confessional Lutheran church body of Germany independent of the above

== See also ==
- Evangelical Lutheran Church (disambiguation)
