= Adalbert Brunke =

- Bishop of Cape Oranje
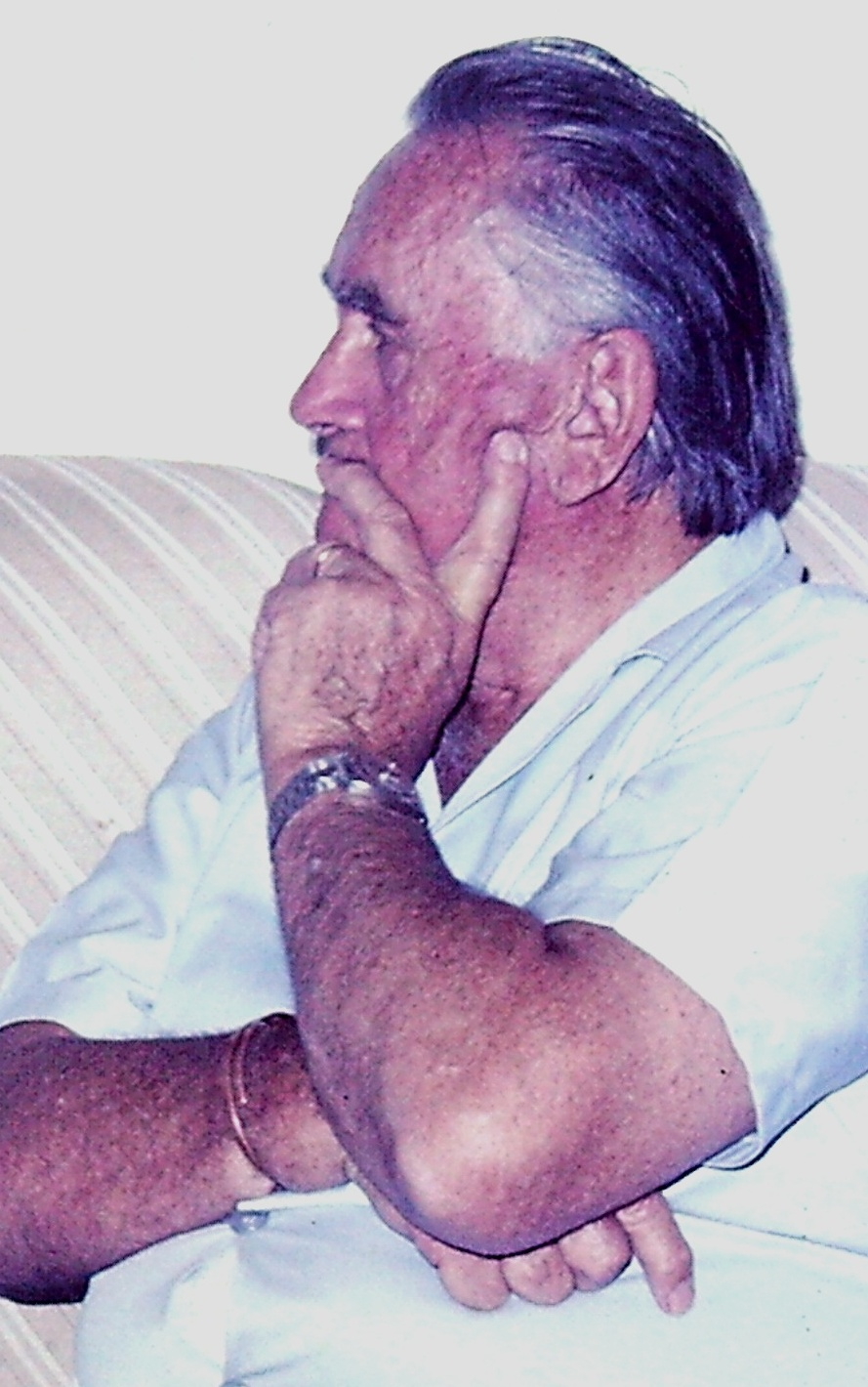
- Adalbert Brunke
- Church: Evangelical Lutheran Church in Southern Africa
- Diocese: Cape Oranje Diocese
- Elected: 1972

Personal details
- Born: May 16, 1912 Alt Czapel (Stare Czaple), West Prussia
- Died: September 25, 2013 (aged 101)

Adalbert Brunke (16 May 1912 – 25 September 2013) was the Bishop of the Cape Oranje Diocese of the Evangelical Lutheran Church in Southern Africa (ELCSA).

Brunke was born in Alt Czapel (Stare Czaple) in West Prussia. In 1939 the Lutheran Church of Germany sent him to Tanzania. After the start of the Second World War he was interned in South Africa by British authorities. In 1949 he began his missionary activity. He was elected the first bishop of his diocese in 1972. Brunke became famous for his pastoral care for Nelson Mandela throughout his detention on Robben Island. Mandela later thanked Brunke several times for his sacrificial service.
