= Extraordinary Lutheran Ministries =

American Lutheran organization founded 2007

Extraordinary Lutheran Ministries (ELM), founded on October 31, 2007, is an organization committed to the full participation of persons of all sexual orientations and gender identities in the life and ministry of the Lutheran church.

== History and background ==
Lutheran Lesbian and Gay Ministries was founded in 1990.

The Extraordinary Candidacy Project was founded in 1993. ECP credentialed openly LGBT seminarians, candidates, ordained and commissioned ministers that were preparing for professional vocations in independent Lutheran parishes and congregations of the Evangelical Lutheran Church in America (ELCA).

The ELM roster currently has 34 ministers, 2 individuals approved for call and 3 seminarians. Discipline for congregations that call pastors from the ELM roster has varied throughout the ELCA. Members of the ELM Roster are/were members of the ELCA and Evangelical Lutheran Church in Canada.

On January 1, 2009, ELM opened the official international office in Chicago, Illinois.

== Extraordinary Ordinations ==
Rooted in the extraordinary ordinations that were performed by Martin Luther and the reformers as recorded in the Lutheran Confessions, 18 Extraordinary Ordinations have taken place to date.

- 1 - 3 Extraordinary Ordination of Jeff Johnson, Ruth Frost and Phyllis Zillhart- January 22, 1990: Pastor Jeff Johnson is called by First United Lutheran Church. Pastors Frost and Zillhart are called by St. Francis Lutheran. This first extraordinary Ordination resulted in a trial and the ultimate expulsion of First United and St. Francis from the Evangelical Lutheran Church in America.
- 4. Extraordinary Ordination of Donna Simon - October 28, 2000, in Kansas City: Pastor Simon was called by Abiding Peace Lutheran.
- 5. Extraordinary Ordination of Craig Minich - February 18, 2001, in Berkeley: Pastor Minich is called by two Oakland churches and University Lutheran in Berkeley
- 6. Extraordinary Ordination of Anita C. Hill - April 28, 2001, in St. Paul, Minnesota: Pastor Hill was called to St. Paul-Reformation Lutheran Church in St. Paul, Minnesota to serve with Pastor Paul Tidemann, a straight pastor in the congregation. The congregation was censured, but the censure is later repealed.
- 7. Extraordinary Ordination of Sharon Stalkfleet - May 12, 2002, in the Bay Area: Pastor Stalkfleet is called to the East Bay Nursing Home
- 8. Extraordinary Ordination of Jay Wiesner - July 25, 2004, in Minneapolis: Pastor Wiesner was originally called by Bethany Lutheran Church in Minneapolis; he is now serving University Lutheran Church of the Incarnation in Philadelphia
- 9. Extraordinary Ordination of Erik Christensen - October 21, 2006, in Chicago: Pastor Christensen was called to St. Luke's of Logan Square.
- 10. Extraordinary Ordination of Megan Rohrer - November 18, 2006, in San Francisco: Pastor Rohrer was called to be the director of the Welcome Ministry with a call from HerChurch; Christ Church; St. Francis and Sts. Mary and Martha in San Francisco. Rohrer became the first openly transgender person to be ordained in the Lutheran church.
- 11. Extraordinary Ordination of Dawn Roginski - June 16, 2007, in San Francisco: Pastor Roginski was called on March 25, 2007, by St Francis Lutheran Church of San Francisco to serve as its Pastor of Parish Programs.
- 12. Extraordinary Ordination of Jen Rude - November 17, 2007, in Chicago: Pastor Rude was called to Resurrection Lutheran and the Night Ministry in Chicago.
- 13. Extraordinary Ordination of Jen Nagel - January 19, 2008, in Minneapolis: Pastor Nagel was called to Salem Lutheran where she had been serving for four and a half years as a pastoral minister.
- 14. Extraordinary Ordination of Lionel Ketola - May 16, 2008, in Newmarket, Ontario: Pastor Ketola was called to Holy Cross where he will serve as associate pastor and Ambassador of Reconciliation. Ketola became the first legally married gay man to be ordained in the Lutheran church. Later, the congregation and the pastors who participated in the ordination were censured by the local bishop.
- 15. Extraordinary Ordination of Lura Groen - July 26, 2008, in Houston: Pastor Groen was called to Grace Evangelical Lutheran Church.
- 16. Extraordinary Ordination of Jodi Barry - October 25, 2008, in Minneapolis: Pastor Barry was the first pastor called by Extraordinary Lutheran Ministries to a specialized ministry. Pastor Barry is a hospital chaplain.
- 17. Extraordinary Ordination of Jay Wilson - December 6, 2008, in San Francisco:
- 18. Extraordinary Ordination of Steve Keiser - January 5, 2009, in Philadelphia, Pennsylvania: Pastor Keiser was ordained at the Lutheran Church of the Holy Communion in Philadelphia.

These ordinations were later validated by the Evangelical Lutheran Church in America when the extraordinarily ordained pastors were brought into the church through a "Rite of Reconciliation." The first rite was held in San Francisco with the "SPS7," when the Revs. Jeff Johnson, Paul Brenner, Megan Rohrer, Dawn Roginski, Ross Merkel, Craig Minich and Sharron Stalkfleet were received into the ELCA. Currently all the extraordinarily ordained pastors have been received into the ELCA except for Jay Wilson.
