= The Lutheran Evangelical Protestant Church =

The Evangelical Protestant Church (GCEPC) or The Lutheran Evangelical Protestant Church (LEPC) is a mainline Protestant denomination under the General Conference of Evangelical Protestant Churches headquartered in Cayce-West Columbia, South Carolina, United States.

The LEPC was officially birthed in 2000 and was formed as a non-profit corporation under the Board of Advisors in 2001. The Lutheran Evangelical Protestant Church (EPC/GCEPC LEPC) ministers across the United States of America and around the world. Its ministers can study at the Concordia Theologica Institute of Biblical Studies. The EPC GCEPC is a member of the National Association of Evangelicals (NAE) and the World Evangelical Alliance (WEA). It is also a member of the Chaplain's Commission and the Mission America Coalition of the NAE.

Like other Lutheran denominations, the LEPC has its roots in the Protestant Reformation that began with Martin Luther’s posting of the Ninety-Five Theses. Its beliefs can be summarized as “Sola Gratia" ("by Divine Grace alone"), Sola Fide ("by Faith alone”), and Sola Scriptura ("by the Bible alone"). This doctrine of salvation through faith through divine grace is held to be true by the LEPC. Scripture alone in matters of life, faith, and practice is held to be true rather than the doctrines and traditions of men. These three are considered to be what makes the LEPC “Lutheran”. The LEPC adheres to the three creeds, Apostles, Nicene, and Athanasian, and confesses Jesus Christ as Savior and Lord and the truth and inerrancy of the Holy Scriptures.

== Core beliefs ==
The core beliefs of the EPC GCEPC/LEPC are:

1. The Holy Scriptures, in the original tongues, are the inspired and inerrant word of God; (Matthew 4:4, 2 Timothy 3:16,17)
2. In one God, eternal and self-existent, Creator and Ruler of the Universe, and manifested through the Father, Son and Holy Spirit;(John 1:18, Matthew 3:16-17, John 1:1, Rev 22:13, Romans 9:15)
3. That Jesus Christ is truly divine and truly human having been conceived of the Holy Spirit and born of the Virgin Mary;(Matthew 1:18-24)
4. That Jesus Christ died on the cross and shed His blood as a Sacrifice for our sins; He arose bodily from the dead, ascended into heaven and is seated at the right hand of the Majesty on High;(1 John 2:2, Hebrews 7:27, Mark 15:33-37, Mark 16:1-8, Luke 24:1-45, Luke 24:51, Psalm 110:1, Matthew 22:44)
5. That humankind was created in the image of God, but fell into sin causing separation from God;(Genesis 3:1-24, 1 Cor 15:21)
6. That salvation has been provided through Jesus Christ for all; and those who repent and believe on Him are born again of the Holy Spirit, receive the gift of eternal life and become the children of God;(John 1:10-13)
7. That the water baptism identifies us with the death and burial of Christ and that we should arise to walk in the newness of life;(Matthew 28:19-20, Acts 8:26-40)
8. In the ministry of the Holy Spirit to glorify Christ, to convict, to enable the believer to live a godly life and to empower the Church to carry the gospel into all the world;(Matthew 12:31, Matt 28:19, Luke 1:35, Luke11: 31, Acts 13:2)
9. In the personal and visible return of Jesus Christ for His Church;(Matthew 24:30, Rev 1:7, Rev 22:12)
10. In the bodily resurrection of the just and the unjust, the everlasting blessedness of the saved and everlasting separation from God of all those who reject Jesus Christ. (John 1:10-13, Rev 20:11-15, Rev 22:14-15, Matthew 25:31-46)

== Position statements ==
The following are the Position Statements of the EPC GCEPC/LEPC as stated on their website.

Baptism: "Water baptism identifies the believer with the death and burial of Christ and that the believer should arise to walk in newness of life. (Matthew 28:19-20, Acts 8:26-40) In baptism a believer is identified with Christ whether by immersion, sprinkling, dunking, or pouring where water is provided for such service. Baptism may be by immersion or pouring or sprinkling if water is not available for immersion."

Ordination: "Ordination into Christian service is for men and woman who have experienced salvation through faith in Christ Jesus and who are baptized believers called by Christ through the Holy Spirit to serve Him in ministry. The LEPC believes that God has set aside particular individuals for service and that ordination is man’s recognition of what God Himself has already done. Men and women may serve as co-laborers with Christ in the harvest fields. Men and women may serve as deacons, overseers, apostles, prophets, pastors, teachers, and evangelist as examples of all of these can be found in scripture concerning both male and female. From the beginning authority was given to both male and female. In Christ there is neither male nor female, Gentile or Jew, but all are children and servants of God. All are called as a royal priesthood. All levels of leadership are open to spirit led men and women of God."

Homosexuality: "The Lutheran Evangelical Protestant Church follows the Bible in all matters of faith including the issue of homosexuality. The LEPC will not knowingly ordain any practicing homosexual to the Christian ministry. The belief of the LEPC is that homosexuality should not be an issue causing division and debate within the Church at large, as Holy Scripture already settles the debate. The Christian faith and the love of Christ calls believers to love the sinner but hate the sin. LEPC Clergy minister to all people, welcomes all people following the example of the Lord, Jesus Christ."

Marriage: "Marriage is the union of a man and a woman. It is a vow made before God that the two (male and female) shall become one. The General Conference of Evangelical Protestant Churches, LEPC and EPC, does not perform same sex unions or bless same sex couples."

Abortion: "Abortion is the willful taking of innocent human life. Human life begins at conception because there is simply no other point that it can begin. Therefore, abortion is not acceptable under any circumstance except in the rare and unusual instance where the life of the mother is at real risk. Only then should an abortion be considered."

Israel and the Jewish People: "The Jewish people are God's chosen people. Believers should bless them as scripture says that God will bless those who bless Israel and curse those who curse Israel. The LEPC/EPC/GCEPC recant and renounce the works and words of Martin Luther concerning the Jewish people. Prayer is offered for the healing of the Jewish people, their peace and their prosperity. Prayer is offered for the peace of Jerusalem. With deep sorrow and regret repentance is offered to the Jewish People for the harm that Martin Luther caused and any contribution to their harm. Forgiveness is requested of the Jewish People for these actions. The Gospel is to the Jew first and then the Gentile. Gentiles (believers in Christ other than Jews) have been grafted into the vine. In Christ there is neither Jew nor Gentile but the Lord's desire is that there be one new man from the two for Christ broke down the wall of separation with His own body (Ephesians 2:14-15).The EPC GCEPC/LEPC blesses Israel and the Jewish people. Prayers are offered for the Middle East and for the salvation and peace of the Arab world."

Unity of the Body of Christ: "The EPC GCEPC/LEPC, admonishes and encourages "In the essentials unity, in the non-essentials liberty, and in all things charity." The EPC GCEPC/LEPC shares the essentials with our many Christian sisters and brothers and this is necessary to our faith and belief in Jesus Christ for salvation. Many schisms have come in the Body of Christ because of conflicts and disagreements over "non-essentials." In the non-essentials liberty is offered for where the Spirit of the Lord is, there is liberty. In all things charity is offered as well as blessing. The EPC GCEPC/LEPC labors alongside others in the Body of Christ in the work of the Lord Jesus Christ as all believers long for His second coming. The Lord Jesus Himself first announced his salvation to world, which cannot be neglected, and God added His witness through signs, wonders, and the distribution of the gifts of the Holy Spirit according to God's will. (Hebrews 2:1-4) The Lord Jesus is the head of God's Church. There are many parts but one Body. Each part of the Body of Christ has been given an assignment from the Lord to fulfill until Jesus' coming. The GCEPC/LEPC/EPC endeavors to complete this work in the spirit of unity and in the bonds of peace."

Sexual abuse: "Incidents of sexual abuse will be reported to civil authorities. Ministers known as perpetrators will not be reassigned nor will known perpetrators be allowed to continue in ministry with the LEPC/GCEPC."

== Organizational structure ==
The LEPC is overseen by the Presiding Bishop with a life appointment . The Board of Advisors appoints the Presiding Bishop with nominations from the Conference. Synod Bishops are appointed by the Presiding Bishop for life with Board of Advisor approval. All Bishops have five year reviews. The Board of Advisors serves in staggered three and two year renewable terms. EPC GCEPC/LEPC congregations and ministries are autonomous. The church is divided into geographical synods and non-geographical synods. Home groups and one new man fellowships are encouraged.

== Role of women ==
The EPC GCPEC/LEPC ordains both men and women to the gospel ministry noting that scripture states that in “Christ Jesus there is neither male not female, Jew or Greek". Also, noting that the Book of Concord states that seminaries are for the preparation of men and women but more so that Holy Scripture does not specifically direct yes or no but rather indicates by example that women did pursue the gospel ministry and did serve in positions of authority in Biblical times. The EPC GCEPC/LEPC professes the "priesthood of all believers". The current and sixth Presiding Bishop of the EPC GCEPC/LEPC is Nancy Kinard Drew. Both males and females may serve on the Executive and Advisory Boards and the Council of Bishops.

== Apostolic succession ==
The EPC GCEPC/LEPC is in historic and valid apostolic succession (AS), which is transmitted "by the laying on of hands during our ordination services of Word and Sacrament".

== Sacraments ==
The EPC GCEPC/LEPC confesses two sacraments: the Eucharist (Communion, The Lord’s Supper) and Holy Baptism. All believers are welcome at the Lord’s Table. The EPC GCEPC/LEPC will baptize infants but for salvation there must be faith in Christ. As seen by the thief on the cross who was told “Today, you shall be with me in paradise,” there are exceptions to the requirements of baptism. One is not saved through baptism only. Such practice would be empty without faith in Christ but one can be saved by faith in Christ without baptism. Baptism alone does not save. It should not be said "I am saved because I am baptized but rather I am saved because of faith in Christ therefore I am/will be baptized."

== Missions ==
The EPC GCEPC/LEPC is missions oriented and has congregations and church plants in the Democratic Republic of the Congo, Nigeria, Angola, and Kenya. Concordia Bible Institute of Kenya prepares indigenous ministers to take the salvation message to their own people. Courses through Concordia Theologica Institute for Biblical Studies are available online for those who desire to meet the educational requirements of the LEPC and link with the LEPC in ministry.

== Worship ==
The EPC GCEPC/LEPC permits a broad range of worship styles from contemporary to traditional to liturgical to renewal/charismatic and messianic.

== See also ==
- List of Lutheran denominations
