= Protestant Hospital of Ngaoundéré =

- Global Health Ministries
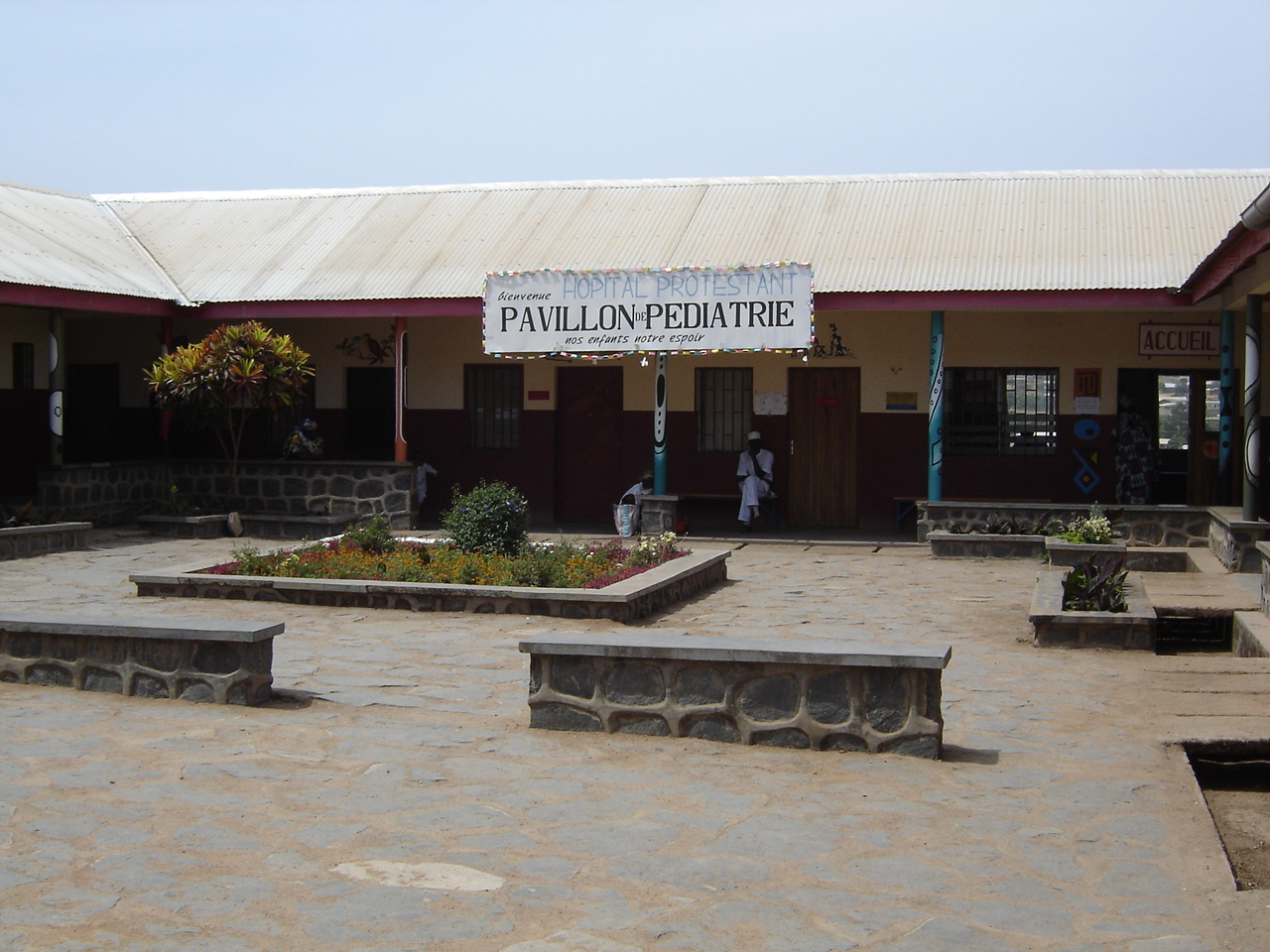
- Main entrance to the Pediatric ward

Geography
- Location: Ngaoundéré, Adamawa Region, Cameroon
- Coordinates: 7.309382°N 13.596818°E

Organisation
- Type: General
- Religious affiliation: Evangelical Lutheran Church of Cameroon

Services
- Emergency department: Yes
- Beds: 200 (2010)

Helipads
- Helipad: No

History
- Founded: 1925

Links
- Website: www.oseelc.org
- Lists: Hospitals in Cameroon

The Protestant Hospital of Ngaoundéré is a Protestant hospital in N'Gaoundere, Cameroon. Founded by Norwegian missionaries of the Norwegian Missionary Society in 1925, and partly funded by a wealthy American donator in Cameroon and the Evangelical Lutheran Church of Cameroon, the hospital has been in full operation since 1957. The Protestant Hospital of Ngaoundéré today employs over 127 people.

== History ==
In 1931 Norwegian missionaries Mr and Mrs Endressen arrived at Ngaoundéré from Madagascar. Mr. Endressen was a pastor and his wife a nurse. They began medical work, visiting patients at home and treating them. Given the number of patients who came to her, she had to ask the mission to build a room where she could hospitalize those who required a formal observation. A straw huts was erected, with one room serving as a hospital room for men and the second for women. Endressen also initiated a health education program in the neighborhood. She taught in particular the prevention of certain diseases such as malaria, tuberculosis, intestinal worms and other sexually transmitted diseases (STDs).

In 1935 however, she succumbed to illness herself and was forced to return to Norway, closing the clinic. Three years later, however, she returned in 1938 and resumed her activities. Desiring a hospital to undertake the great work, one evening she went to the present site of the hospital and prayed to God for a hospital being built. At that time, the site was not yet chosen. The Sudan Mission had already issued in 1945 the idea of collaborating with the NMS and the Fraternal Lutheran Mission (MFL) north of Cameroon for the establishment of a hospital because they lacked the funds for the construction of a hospital. This hospital should be beneficial not only for the indigenous population but also for the care for the missionaries in the area. By this time, however, the government had begun construction of a hospital in Meiganga and would not consider building another hospital and the initial proposals were rejected due to strong opposition. In 1947, however, the NMS decided to send a doctor to aid the work of Endressen. Dr. Bernt Sigurd Bjaanes, a Norwegian who had arrived with his wife in Cameroon in December 1947.

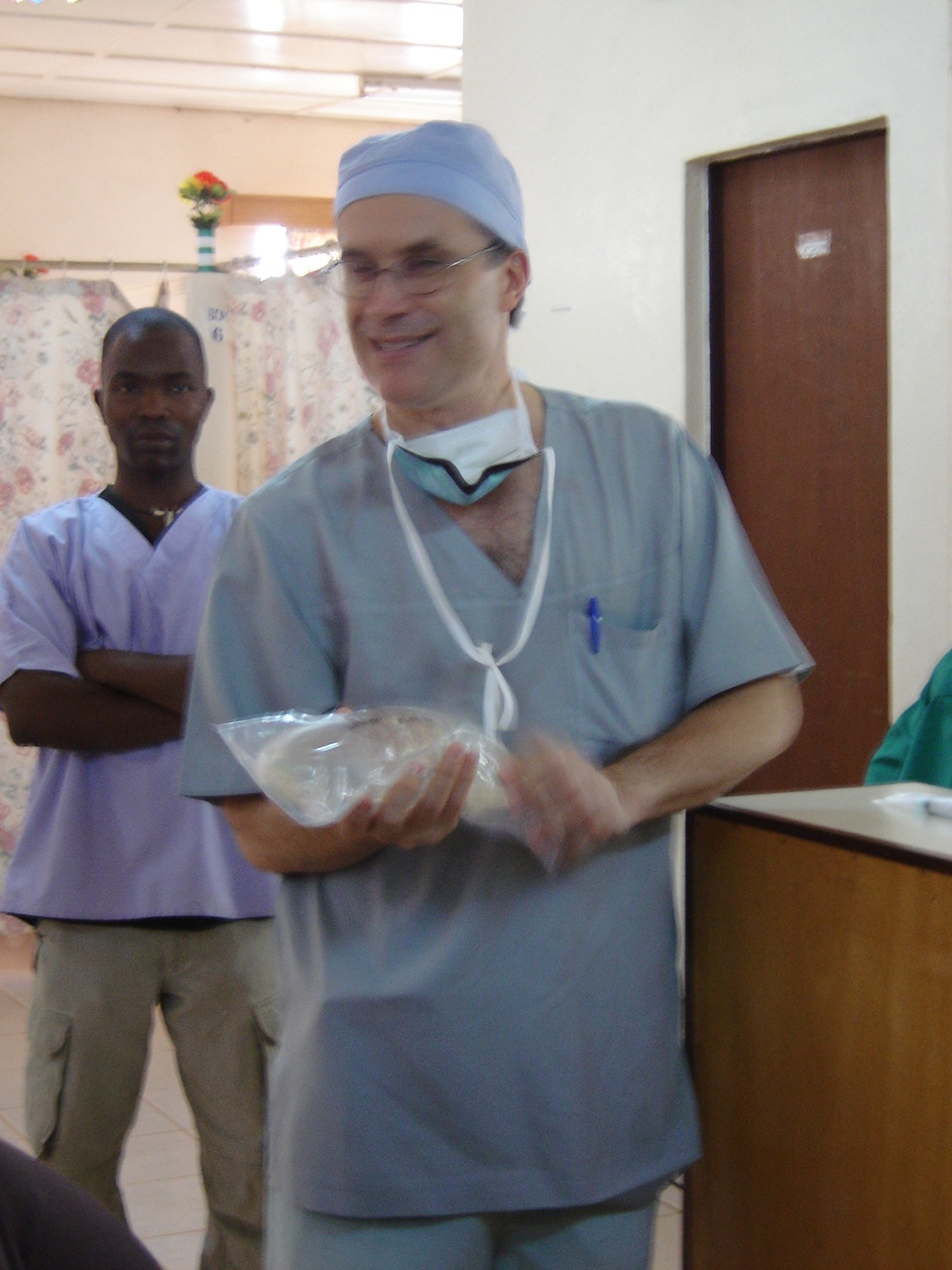
European physicians in the hospital

In 1948 a new plan was presented by the Pastor Endressen Pastor and in June of that year John Fosse, a nurse and deacon arrived and three Cameroonian medical students were added to this team. One died and was replaced by another Cameroonian, Moussa Martin, and the three students would become part of the first class of nursing students in 1954. In 1949 the idea of the creation of the Ngaoundéré Protestant Hospital was already well advanced and the site that should accommodate the hospital was found. That same year, the Directorate of NMS sent a Norwegian architect Ove Aasen, to start construction work on the clinic of Dr. Bjaanes and the hospital. When Dr. Syrdal became Superintendent of the NMS he made a great effort to reach an agreement with the Sudan Mission to build a hospital in Ngaoundéré in the early 1950s. This reached a climax at a meeting on 2 February 1953 to clarify things.

Following this development, it was now under consideration to finance the construction of the hospital. As stated above, the SM had already received enough money to build a hospital but this was not enough money to build a common hospital. In addition, the economic situation of the NMS became increasingly critical, which did not allow him to continue funding the construction of the hospital despite the fact that construction work had already started. On the proposal of Pastor Keller, secretary of the Mission, a request for assistance was sent to a French organization FIDES. A sum of 100 million francs had been requested, but only 2,882,000 francs have been achieved. FIDES were interested in particular in surgery and dentistry facilities but were not willing to finance the whole unit. By circumstance, a rich American named Young was in Cameroon and promised to contribute a sum of $ 25,000 enabling the construction of the hospital which would not only enabled full services to be provided but would finance the building of a school for nurses, and homes of the doctors and some nurses. In a letter dated 20 April 1954, Young also promised to pay the operating costs of the hospital for a minimum period of 5 years and a maximum period of 10 years. The generous donation was regarded by the missionaries as a gift from God enabling the creation of an advanced hospital in Ngaoundéré.

== Construction ==
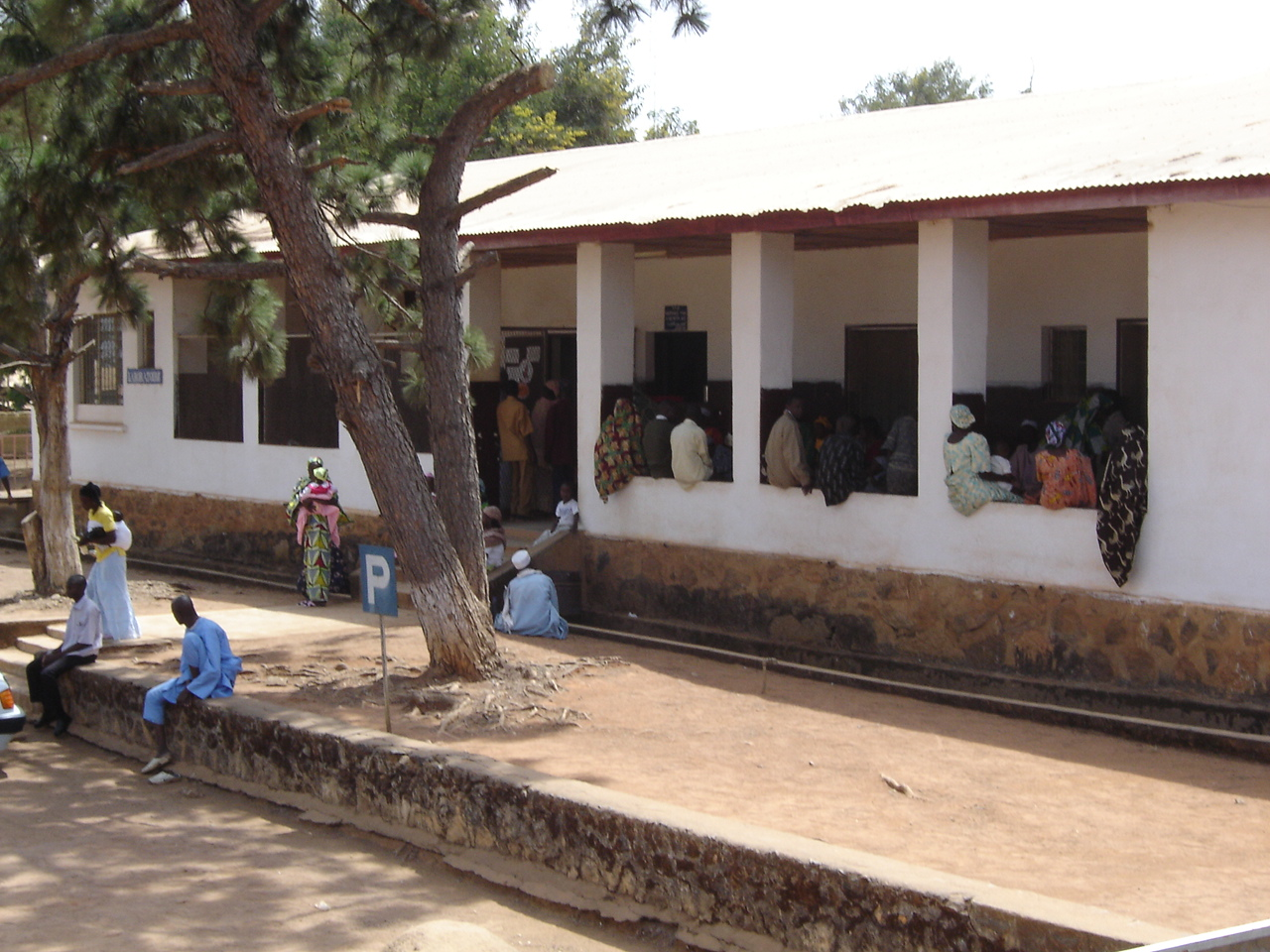
Patients at the accident and emergency unit

A construction committee was appointed to conduct the work until its completion. This committee was composed by Oscar Noss (SM) and Ada Kopstad (NMS). The use of the donation of 25,000 dollars was directly used for the construction of 2 buildings of 5 rooms for patients (50,000 francs), hospital equipment with a value of 305 000 francs, a building for a dental clinic (500 000 francs), dental equipment (500,000 francs), dental surgery (720 000 francs), a pavilion for whites, which would include 4 hospital rooms, two dining rooms, two kitchens, four showers and toilets and an exam room and deliveries (1,350 000 francs), and a chapel and a classroom for medical students (500 000 francs). The land on which the hospital was built Ngaoundéré was awarded to the Norwegian Mission by Order No. 353 of 24 June 1949. Ove Aasen was the principal architect of the hospital. On the request, the High Commissioner of the Republic of Cameroon residing in Yaoundé on 4 September 1952, according to plan which was presented by Mr. Endressen, authorised the outbuildings, a clinic, four hospital units, a sterilization facility, and the installation of water and sanitation.

In 1956 the Young Foundation gave a total of 48,800 dollars that helped build a pavilion surgery, a dental clinic, the dentist's residence, and even the house of Aasen the architect. It also built an annex for the hospital, two houses for nurses, a kitchen for the surgical pavilion, a room for the generator, ten hospital rooms and an office amounting to 41,600 dollars. It was completed in 1957 and plays an important role in healthcare in the city and surrounding area today.

== Medical services ==
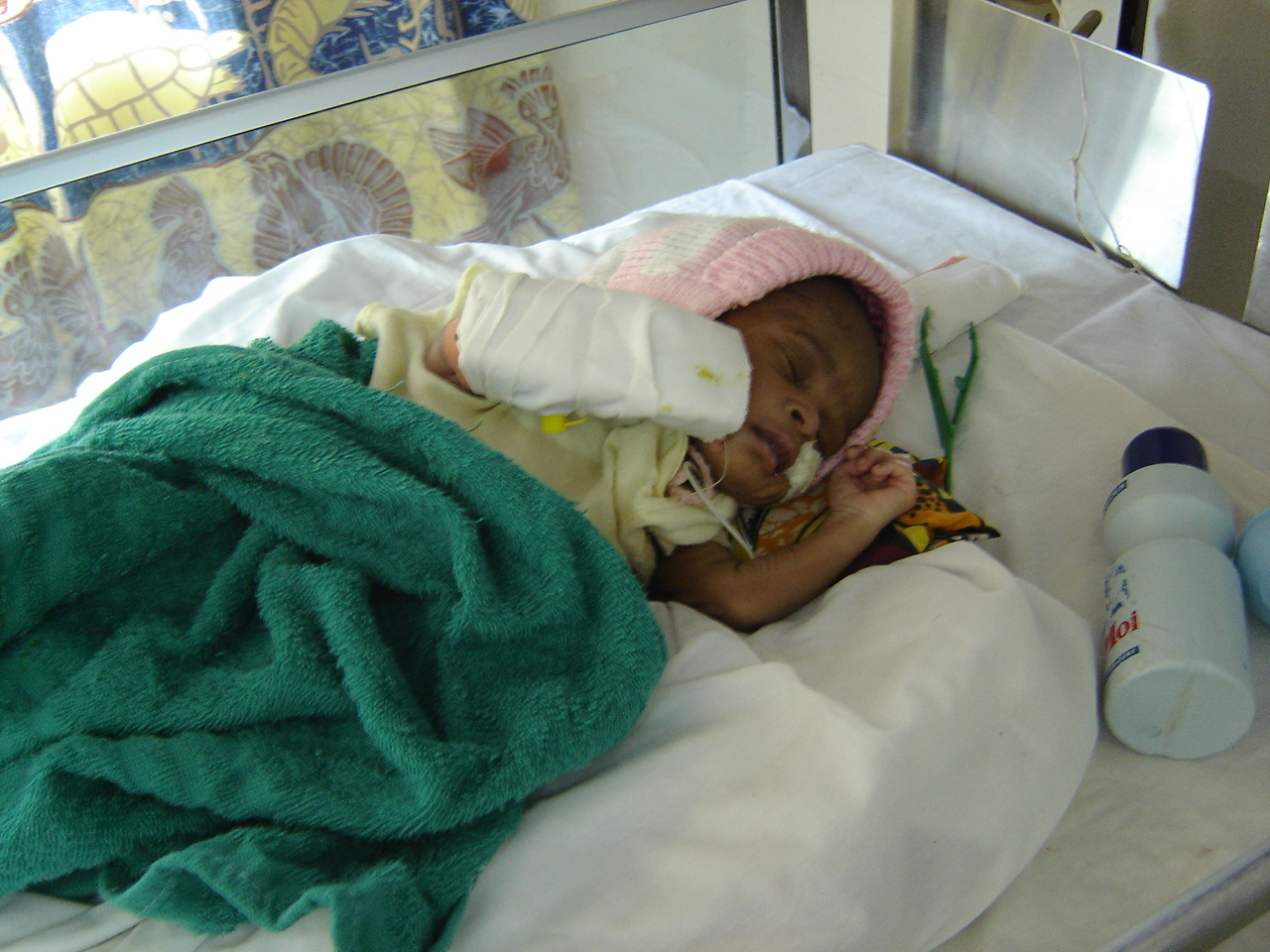
A premature baby in the hospital

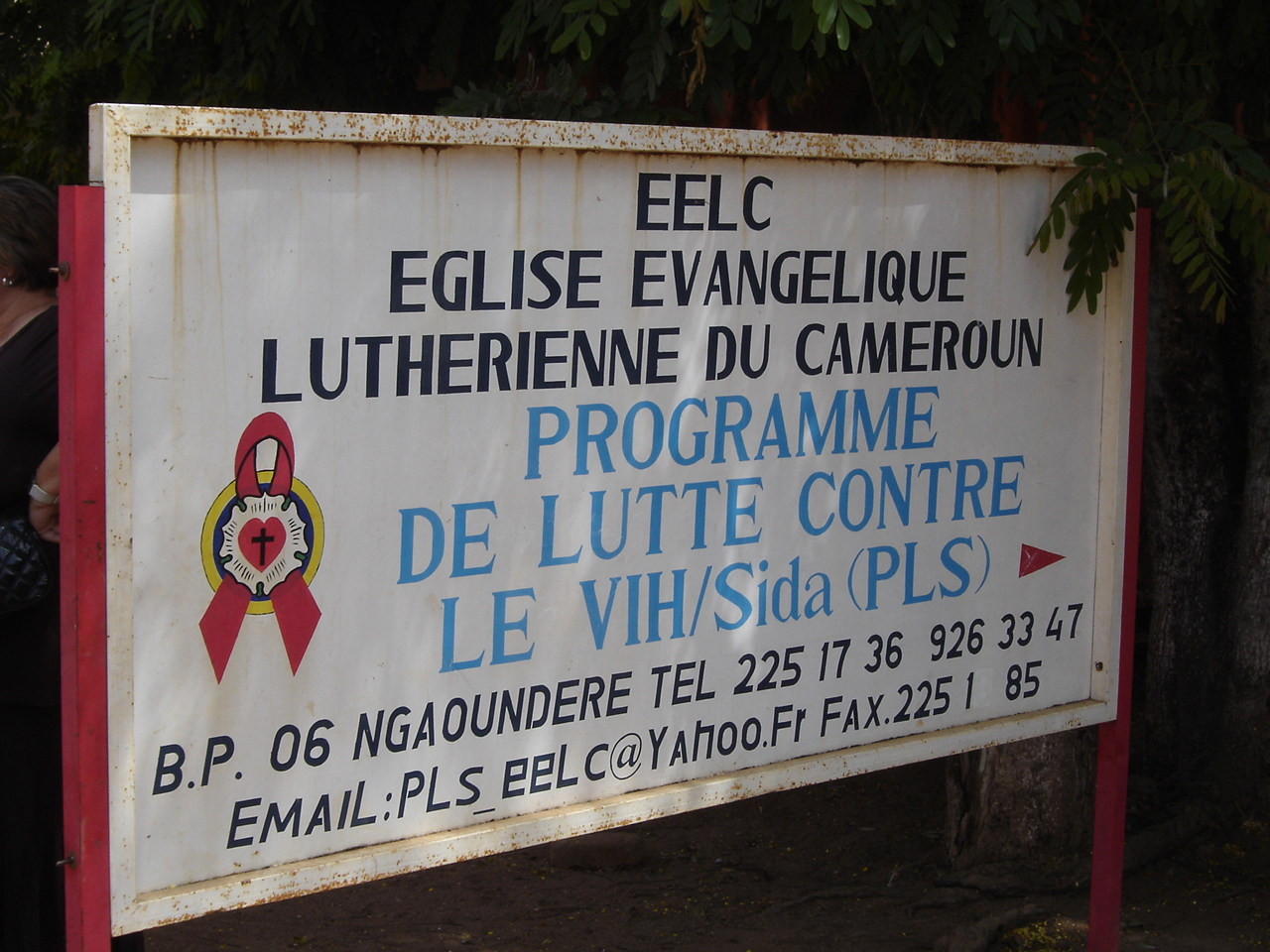
The AIDS/HIV unit

The hospital provides the following services:

- Clinic
- Department of Medicine
- Medical imaging services (X-ray, ultrasound, mammography, endoscopy);
- Maternity service
- Maternal and Child Health
- Laboratory Service
- Service operating theater
- Department of Surgery
- Department of Pediatrics
- Service Réanimation
- Burns Service
- Emergency service
- Physiotherapy service
- Service Hospital Chaplaincy
- Social Service
- Pharmacy Service and Fund
- Biomedical Maintenance Service
- Service Statistics
- Maintenance Service
- Unit Support for People Living with HIV / AIDS (UPEC)
- Prevention of Mother to Child Transmission (PMTCT)
- Program against tuberculosis
- Expanded Program on Immunization

== See also ==
- Evangelical Lutheran Church of Cameroon
