= Synod Assembly =

A synod assembly is an event in which nominated representatives of congregations in one of the regional synods of the Evangelical Lutheran Church in America vote on how to run the synod, elect in bishops, and elect representatives to the ELCA's church-wide assembly.

In the United States, Lutheran churches are divided into units called synods or districts and circuits. These units have an assembly—often referred to as a synod assembly—composed of ordained ministers and lay representatives. This governing body exercises legislative, executive, and judicial function as prescribed by its own constitution and bylaws. The pastor presides at a synod assembly.
