= St David's Church, Fairwater =

Church in Cardiff, Wales

St David's Fairwater
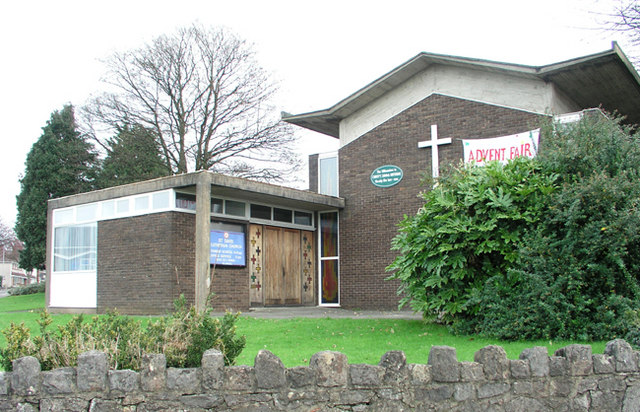
- St David's Fairwater
- 51.4897°N 3.2398°W
- Denomination: Lutheran
- Website: lutheranstdavidscardiff.webs.com

History
- Status: Active

Architecture
- Heritage designation: Grade II
- Designated: 2 April 2007
- Architect: Vernon Kinch
- Style: Brutalist
- Completed: August 1961

Specifications
- Materials: brick, concrete

Clergy
- Pastor: Revd. Arno Bessel (vacancy pastor)

St David's Church, Fairwater is a Lutheran church in Fairwater, Cardiff, Wales.

There has been a Lutheran community in central Cardiff since the 19th Century, but that in Fairwater is far more recent, forming only after new housing development in the post-war years. The church was designed by Vernon Kinch of Alex Gordon and Partners, and was completed in 1961. it belongs to the Evangelical Lutheran Church of England, and became a grade II listed building in 2007. Aside from some minor changes in joinery and the replacement of the original windows, the church is largely unaltered.
