= Presbyterian Church of Guyana =

The Presbyterian Church of Guyana was founded by missionaries of the Church of Scotland. On September 23, 1815, a Scotsmen bought an unfinished church building from the Dutch. This was the St. Andrew's Kirk, Georgetown. The first minister was Rev Archibald Brown, who arrived in September 1816. Many members were slave owners, but from 1821 slaves were admitted to the worship services. The church developed, the Presbyterian Church of Guyana was formed in 1837. By 1861, it absorbed the remnants of the Nederduitch Hervormde Kerk in Guyana. In 1945, a capital sum was paid to the presbytery and the church ceased its financial aid. In 1967, the Church of Scotland dissolved the Presbytery and it became an autonomous denomination. Membership was 5,600 in 25 congregations. It adheres to the Westminster Confession.

A member of the World Communion of Reformed Churches.
