= Sophia Abdi Noor =

Hon. Sophia Abdi Noor
- Born: Ijara Constituency, Kenya
- Awards: " Social Justice Award from the International Leadership Institute in Minnesota" Society of Kenya"

Sophia Abdi Noor is a Kenyan Politician serving as a Member of Parliament Ijara Constituency. She is the first woman to be elected as a Member of the 10th Parliament of Kenya from the North Eastern Region of Kenya.

She fights for the rights of the marginalized in the Community through Gender Equality Campaigns.[Women's Islamic Initiative in Spirituality and Equality]

== Early life and education ==
She has a Diploma in Community Development and has been very vocal in advocating against retrogressive cultural practices in her community .

She recently obtained a BA in Development Studies at Arusha Tanzania and a Masters in Executive Management development from USIU.

== Political career ==
In the August 2017 elections, Noor emerged victorious in the Ijara constituency elections .

== Work ==
After her Diploma, Noor worked with international bodies like Oxfam, Save the Children, CARE International, and World Vision, MSF-Spain, UNHCR, and MIKONO International.

== Awards ==
- Social justice award from the International Leadership Institute in Minnesota
- The International Democracy Fellowship from the Lees Aspen Center for Governance in Washington DC
- The Father John Kaiser Human Rights Award of the Year in 2007 by the Law Society of Kenya
