= Methodist Church in the Caribbean and the Americas =

Coordinates: 17.1206°N 61.8414°W

The Methodist Church in the Caribbean and Americas is a Methodist denomination in Anguilla, Antigua and Barbuda, Aruba, the Bahamas, Barbados, Belize, Bonaire, the British & the US Virgin Islands, the Cayman Islands, Costa Rica, Curaçao, Dominica, Grenada, Guyana, Haiti, Honduras, Jamaica, Panama, Saint Kitts and Nevis, Saint Lucia, Saint Martin, Saint Vincent and the Grenadines, Sint Eustatius, Trinidad and Tobago, and the Turks and Caicos Islands. The Connexion is divided into eight districts:

- Bahamas Turks and Caicos Islands District
- Belize/Honduras District
- Guyana District
- Haiti District
- Jamaica District
- Leeward Islands District
- Panama/Costa Rica District
- South Caribbean District

The church has 700 congregations and over 62,000 members. A strong relationship with the United Church of Canada and the United Methodist Church has been established. The church is a member of the Council of Evangelical Latin American and Caribbean Methodist Churches (CIEMAL: El Consejo de Iglesias Evangélicas Metodistas de América Latina y el Caribe).

As of August 2020 the current Connexional President is Bishop Everald L. Galbraith. The Conference Office is based in St John's, Antigua.

The Methodist Church was founded by the British Methodist Mission in the 18th century.
