= Evangelical Lutheran Church in Peru =

Lutheran denomination in Peru

The Evangelical Lutheran Church in Peru (Spanish: Iglesia Evangélica Luterana en el Perú, German: Deutschsprachige Evangelisch lutherische Kirche in Peru) is a Lutheran denomination in Peru, founded by a group of German pastors in 1924 in Lima, in association with the Evangelical Church of Germany (EKD in German). It is a member of the Lutheran World Federation, which it joined in 1957. It is a member of the Latin American Council of Churches. It is commonly known as Christuskirche (Church of Christ in German). The church offer services in both German and Spanish languages.
