= Augsburg (disambiguation) =

Augsburg is a city in Germany.

Augsburg may also refer to:

== Places ==
- Augsburg (district), in Bavaria, Germany
- Augsburg, Arkansas, a small town in the United States
- Augsburg, Illinois, an unincorporated community
- Prince-Bishopric of Augsburg, a prince-bishopric (principality ruled politically by a prince-bishop) of the Holy Roman Empire that belonged to the Swabian Circle

== Education ==
- Augsburg University, in Minneapolis, Minnesota, United States
- University of Augsburg, in Augsburg, Germany

== Organizations ==
- FC Augsburg, a German football club
- Grand Alliance (League of Augsburg), a European coalition during the late 17th century
- Augsburg Airways, a now defunct German airline

== Religion ==
- Augsburg Confession, a Lutheran church document
- Augsburg Fortress, the publishing house of the Evangelical Lutheran Church in America (ELCA)
- Augsburg Fortress Canada, the publishing for the Evangelical Lutheran Church in Canada (ELCIC)

== Ships ==
- SMS Augsburg, a 4,400 ton light cruiser of the Imperial Germany Navy, launched 1909
- German frigate Augsburg (F222) a frigate, in service from 1962 to 1988
- German frigate Augsburg (F213) a frigate in service from 1989 to 2015
- SS Augsburg, a steamship that disappeared in 1912

== See also ==
- Willard S. Augsbury (1858–1939), New York politician
