= Portuguese Evangelical Lutheran Church =

The Portuguese Evangelical Lutheran Church (Igreja Evangélica Luterana Portuguesa or IELP) is a Confessional Lutheran church. It is a member of the European Lutheran Conference and of the International Lutheran Council.

== History ==
=== Beginnings ===
Rev. Rodolpho Hasse visited Portugal in 1952, followed by the president of the Evangelical Lutheran Church of Brazil (IELB). They intended to introduce a radio program and investigate the possibility of missionary work in Portugal. IELB's 32nd National Convention officially authorized the beginning of work in Portugal in 1954. The first Lutheran congregation was organized in Lisbon on 3 July 1958. The Portuguese Evangelical Lutheran Church was founded on 28 May 1959.

=== Expansion ===
At first the activities of the IELP were concentrated in the region between Lisbon and Caldas da Rainha. Work was expanded northward in the 1970s. The first parish in the Porto District was established in the early 1990s.

=== Current ===
The IELP has regular activities in four localities: Mercês (Lisbon), Maia (Porto), Ponte de Lima (North), and Angra do Heroismo (Açores). The church has two active pastors and its president is Rev. Adalberto Hiller. The IELP has three congregations, 145 baptized members, and 112 communicant members.
