= Jen Nagel =

Bishop (born 1972)

The Reverend Jennifer Nagel
- Bishop of the Minneapolis Area Synod of the ELCA
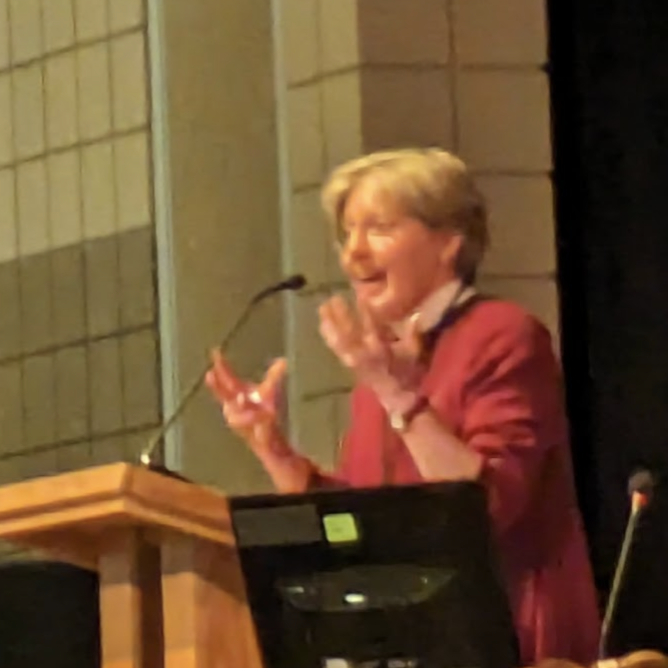
- Jen Nagel shortly after being elected, 2024
- Elected: May 4, 2024
- Predecessor: Ann Svennungsen
- Other posts: Pastor at University Lutheran Church of Hope, Pastoral Ministry (later Pastor) at Salem English Lutheran Church

Orders
- Ordination: 2008 (Extraordinary); 2010 (Recognized)

Personal details
- Born: March 16, 1972 (age 54) New Ulm, Minnesota
- Denomination: Lutheran
- Spouse: Rev. Jane McBride
- Children: 2
- Occupation: Bishop
- Education: University of Chicago Divinity School; Lutheran School of Theology at Chicago; Concordia College; University of St. Andrews-St. Mary’s School of Divinity

Jen Nagel (born March 16, 1972) is a Bishop in the Evangelical Lutheran Church of America (ELCA). She was elected to a six-year term in 2024. She is the first lesbian to hold the title of Bishop for the Minneapolis Area Synod.

== Education ==
Nagel attended University of St. Andrews-St. Mary's School of Divinity from 1992 to 1993, and graduated from Concordia College with a bachelor's degree in religion in 1994. She then attended the University of Chicago Divinity School, where she graduated with a masters of divinity in 1998. She then attended the Lutheran School of Theology at Chicago and earned a certificate of studies in 1999, along with an internship at Lord of Light Lutheran Church. She would also have an internship at the University of Michigan - Ann Arbor.

== Ministry ==
Nagel first served at Salem English Lutheran Church in Minneapolis, beginning in 2003. Initially, she served as Pastoral Ministry, until her ordination in 2008, when she became a pastor. However, non-celibate members of the LGBT the ELCA were not allowed to be officially ordained until 2009. Instead, she was 'extraordinarily ordained' by Extraordinary Lutheran Ministries, until she was formally recognized by the ELCA in 2010. From 2008 onwards, she continued as pastor of that church until 2015.

She then served as Lead Pastor for the University Lutheran Church of Hope from 2015, until her election to bishop in May 2024. She officially assumed the position on September 21, 2024. As bishop, her goals have been to strengthen the synod's ties to Lutheran churches in Nigeria and Germany. In 2025, she attended the Lutheran World Federation's Retreat of Newly Elected Leaders along with 12 other bishops in Bossey. Nagel was a vocal supporter of Yehiel Curry during his election as Presiding Bishop of the ELCA in 2025.

On October 15, 2025, she was elected the executive committee of the Conference of Bishops.

On January 12, 2026, Nagel issued a statement following the killing of Renée Good, urging local Minneapolis and State officials to "to everything in their power to protect every Minnesotan from unlawful harassment and targeting by ICE."

On Ash Wednesday of 2026, Nagel attempted to enter Whipple Federal Building to visit detainees. She, and representatives of other denominations, were turned away by guards. In response, the Minneapolis Synod of the ELCA and the Minnesota Conference of the United Church of Christ filed a lawsuit against the DHS on February 23, 2026. Federal Judge Jerry W. Blackwell ruled in favor of Nagel and the religious organizations, and ordered on March 20, 2026, that the Department of Homeland Security had to allow her and other clergy members entry. Nagel later encouraged Lutherans to vote in the 2026 United States elections, stating that "civic engagement — including voting — is a part of our baptismal vocation."

== Personal life ==
Nagel is married to Rev. Jane McBride, a pastor in the United Church of Christ. They have two children.

== See also ==
- List of ELCA synods
- Timeline of women's ordination
- Christianity and sexual orientation
- List of Christian denominations affirming LGBTQ people
