= Evangelical Lutheran Church in Zambia =

Religious organization

- Classification: Protestant
- Orientation: Lutheranism
- Region: Zambia
- Origin: 1983
- Members: 5,600

The Evangelical Lutheran Church in Zambia is an Evangelical Lutheran church in Zambia. It has a membership of 5,600 in 30 congregations and has been a member of the Lutheran World Federation since 2002. It is also affiliated with its regional expression, the Lutheran Communion in Southern Africa, and with the Christian Council of Zambia. The church's head is Rev. Alfred Chana, senior pastor.

The church was established in 1983 and registered as the Evangelical Lutheran Church in Zambia in 1986.
