= Evangelical Lutheran Church – Peru =

The Evangelical Lutheran Church - Peru (Iglesia Evangélica Luterana - Perú) is a Lutheran denomination founded in Arequipa by the Norwegian Lutheran Mission in 1978. The mission in Arequipa became an independent church in 1995, but kept support and connection with the Norwegian missionaries. As of August 2023, it is an associate member of the International Lutheran Council, having joined in 2007. It has also participated in the Global Confessional and Missional Lutheran Forum.

The IEL-P has established congregations in Arequipa, where its denominational headquarters are located, and also in Cusco, Puno, and Tacna. It operates its own Lutheran Seminary (SETELA, Seminario Teológico Luterano Andino, Andean Lutheran Theological Seminary). The IEL-P has an evangelical, confessional, conservative theology regarding the inspiration of the Bible and the historical creeds (Nicean-Athanasian, Luther's Small Catechism, and other historical documents).
