= Conservative Lutheran Association =

- Classification: Lutheran
- Associations: National Association of Evangelicals
- Region: United States
- Origin: 1965
- Congregations: 4
- Members: 994
- Other name(s): World Confessional Lutheran Association (1965–1980)

The World Confessional Lutheran Association was established in 1965 by a group of Lutheran pastors and lay people who were concerned about trends in the American Lutheran Church and other synods which were contrary to what they believed were the historical beliefs and practice of Lutheranism.

In 1980 through the involvement of Lutherans Alert National the group was renamed Conservative Lutheran Association (CLA).. It has 994 baptized members in 4 congregations, and is a member of the National Association of Evangelicals.

The CLA is not a synod, but is rather an association of churches which hold to beliefs found in the Lutheran confessions.
