= Regina Hassanally =

Lutheran bishop

The Reverend Regina Hassanally
- Bishop of the Southeastern Minnesota Synod of the ELCA
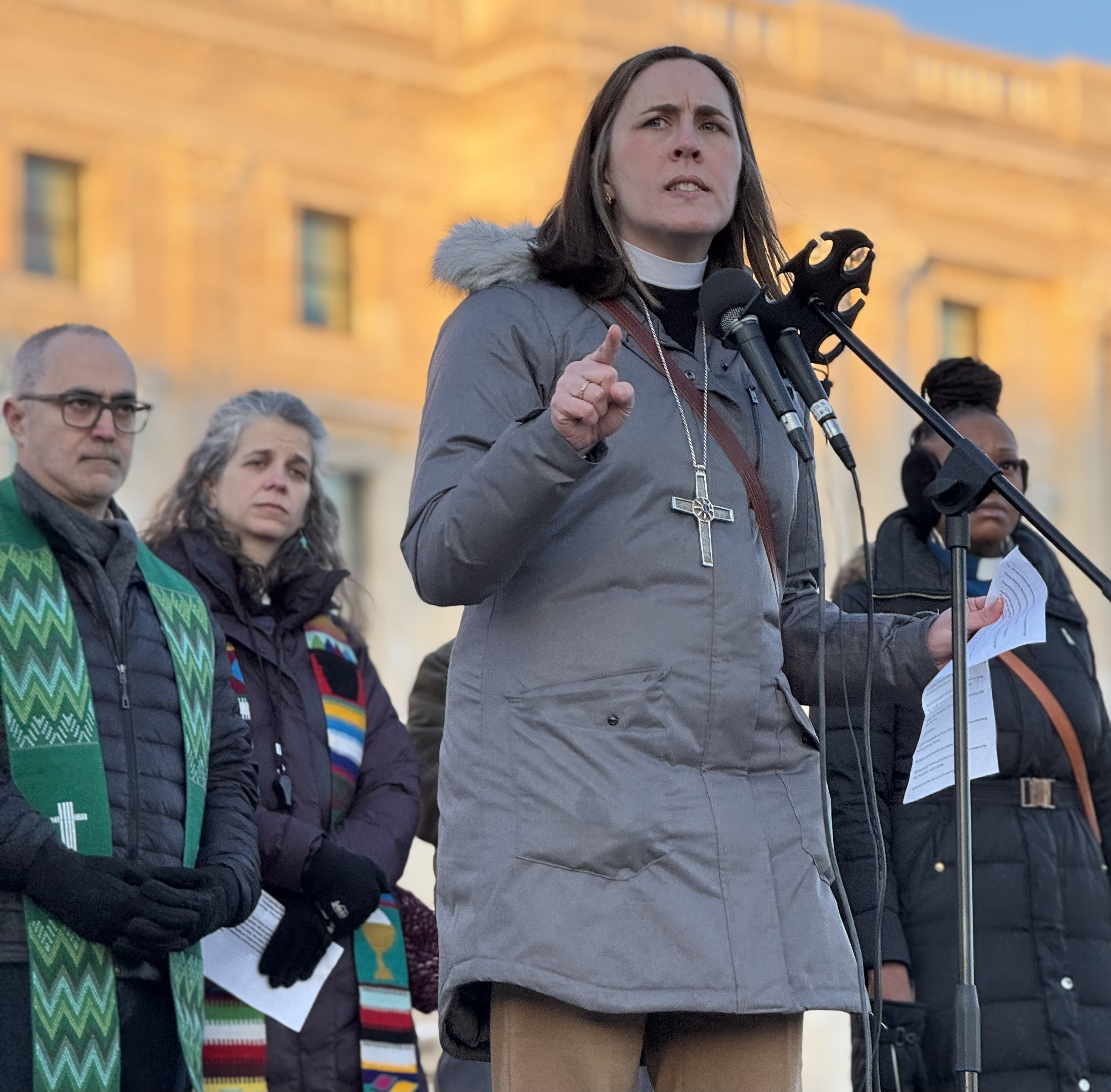
- Regina Hassanally with other clergy in 2026
- Elected: 2019, 2025
- Predecessor: Steven Delzer
- Other post: Pastor of St. Luke Lutheran Church

Personal details
- Denomination: Lutheran
- Spouse: Terrence Hassanally
- Children: 4
- Occupation: Bishop
- Education: Northwestern College; Palmer Theological Seminary

Regina Hassanally is a bishop in the Evangelical Lutheran Church in America (ELCA). She is bishop for the Southeastern Minnesota Synod. She was elected as bishop in 2019.

== Education ==
Hassanally attended Northwestern College from 2001 until 2005, graduating with a Bachelors Degree in Biology Health Professions. She then attended Palmer Theological Seminary from 2005 until 2008, graduating with a Master of Divinity Degree.

== Ministry ==
Hassanally served as director of shared ministry at St. John’s Lutheran Church in Northfield, Minnesota from 2008-2012. She was later pastor of St. Luke Lutheran Church in Goodhue, Minnesota from 2012-2019.

In 2019, she was elected as bishop of the Southeastern Minnesota Synod for a six-year term. She was re-elected in 2025. In 2019, she was elected on the fifth ballot, and she was re-elected in 2025 on the first ballot with 91% of the vote. She is the first woman to hold the position. As bishop, she has been an advocate against gun violence.

Hassanally gave a speech at a vigil following the killing of Renée Good.
