= Evangelical Lutheran Church in the Republic of Moldova =

Church body in Moldova

The Evangelical Lutheran Church in the Republic of Moldova (ELCRM)
- Classification: Protestant
- Superintendent: Vladimir Moser
- Region: Moldova and Europe
- Origin: 1994; Moldova
- Official website: http://www.lutheran.md

The Evangelical Lutheran Church in the Republic of Moldova (ELCRM) (unofficial English translation; Russian: Евангелическо-лютеранская церковь в Республике Молдова (ЕЛЦРМ)) is a small Lutheran church body in the Republic of Moldova. Reverend Vladimir Moser is the superintendent of the ELCRM.

== History ==
The Lutheran Church in Moldova has its roots in the 18th century. In 1994 Natalia and Vladimir Moser, with a group of German Lutheran families, started to rebuild the Lutheran church in Moldova. In 1997 Vladimir Moser was ordained and appointed as a preacher of the Lutheran congregation in Tiraspol. Moser founded congregations in Bender, Chișinău, Rîbnița, and Camenca. In the spring of 1999, the Evangelical Lutheran Church in the Republic of Moldova was registered formally with the Moldovan authorities.

Norsk Luthersk Lekmannsmisjon (NLL) started missionary work in Moldova in the fall of 1999 and created a formal cooperation agreement with the ELCRM. A little later the Nordisk Östmission (NÖ) also began missionary work in Moldova. also in cooperation with the ELCRM. Financial support from NÖ, has made it possible for the ELCRM to buy the Lutheran Center, a car and a garage for the church, instruments for revival meetings, as well as liturgical equipment.
