= Evangelical Lutheran Church of England =

- Classification: Protestant
- Orientation: Lutheran
- Polity: Synodical
- Associations: European Lutheran Conference; International Lutheran Council
- Region: Great Britain
- Origin: 1896 (Oldest congregation); 1954 (Officially founded)
- Congregations: 20
- Official website: https://lutheranchurch.org.uk

The Evangelical Lutheran Church of England (ELCE) is a confessional Lutheran synod in the United Kingdom. It has congregations in England, Wales and Scotland.

The ELCE's oldest congregations date back to 1896, and the ELCE itself was founded in 1954. It currently has 20 congregations and missions, and a seminary, Westfield House, in Cambridge. Together, there are about 900 baptized members.

The ELCE is a member of the European Lutheran Conference and of the International Lutheran Council.

== Congregations ==
=== Greater London ===
- Holy Trinity Lutheran Church; Tottenham, London.
- Luther-Tyndale Memorial Church; Kentish Town.
- St Andrew's Lutheran Church; Ruislip.
- Christ Lutheran Church, Petts Wood.
- St Paul's Lutheran Church; Borehamwood.

=== East of England ===
- Ascension; Brandon.
- Resurrection Lutheran Church; Cambridge.
- Redeemer Lutheran Church; Harlow.
- Ipswich Lutheran Mission.

=== South East England ===
- Our Saviour Lutheran Church; Fareham.
- Oxford Lutheran Mission.
- Rainham Lutheran Mission.

=== South West England ===
- St Peter's Lutheran Church; Plymouth.
- Cheltenham Lutheran Mission.

=== West Midlands ===
- Good Shepherd Lutheran Church, Coventry.

=== North East England ===
- St Timothy's Lutheran Mission, Sunderland.

=== Scotland ===
- St Columba Lutheran Church; East Kilbride.

=== Wales ===
- St David's Church, Fairwater; Cardiff.

== Lutheran Radio UK ==
The ELCE started broadcasting an internet-only radio station, Lutheran Radio UK, on March 4, 2012. The station features daily services, discussions, and music.

== See also ==
- Lutheran Church in Great Britain
