= The Lutheran Church of Senegal =

Lutheran church in Senegal

The Lutheran Church of Senegal (LCS) is a Lutheran church. It joined to Lutheran World Federation in 1992. It is also member in Lutheran Communion in Central & Western Africa. Church has 4,053 members and its president is Rev. Mamadou T. Diouf LCS has 13 congregations and it carries out proclamation work in two districts.
