= Lutheran Church of Rwanda =

Lutheran denomination in Rwanda

The Lutheran Church of Rwanda (Itorero Ry' Abalutheri Ry' Urwanda, Église luthérienne du Rwanda) is a Lutheran denomination in Rwanda. It is a member of the Lutheran World Federation, which it joined in 2002. It is also a member of the Conseil protestant du Rwanda. and the World Council of Churches.

The Lutheran Church of Rwanda (LCR) was established in 1994; it continued the work of German missionaries. It was formed by Rwandan refugees returning from Tanzania after the Rwandan genocide.

Preachers are trained through the Theological Education and Leadership Development (TELD) Bible school.

In 2023, its president was Bishop Evalister Mugabo.
