= Evangelical Lutheran Church in Sierra Leone =

- Classification: Protestant
- Orientation: Lutheranism
- Region: Sierra Leone
- Members: 3,150

The Evangelical Lutheran Church in Sierra Leone is an Evangelical Lutheran church in Sierra Leone. In 2011 it had a membership of around 3,150 people, It has been a member of the Lutheran World Federation since 1990.
