= Evangelical Lutheran Church in Guyana =

Protestant denomination in Guyana

- Abbreviation: ELCG
- Classification: Protestant
- Orientation: Lutheran
- Associations: Lutheran World Federation; Caribbean Conference of Churches; Guyana Council of Churches
- Origin: 1743; Berbice
- Congregations: 44 (2018)
- Members: 1,332 (2018)
- Ministers: 9 pastors; 11 deacons
- Other names: Ebenezer Lutheran Church (1743–1943); Evangelical Lutheran Church in British Guiana (1943–1966)
- Official website: www.elcguyana.org

The Evangelical Lutheran Church in Guyana (ELCG) is a Lutheran denomination in Guyana. It is a member of the Lutheran World Federation (which it joined in 1947), the Caribbean Conference of Churches, and the Guyana Council of Churches.

The first church was established in 1743 and faced various difficulties in its early history. Establishment of a relationship with American Lutherans brought extensive missionary help, but resulted in a transition to a self-sufficient church body that was not always easy. It received a government charter in 1943, but the last missionaries were not withdrawn until the 1980s.

As of 2018, the ELCG has 44 congregations with 1,332 communicant members and 9 pastors and 11 deacons.

== History ==
=== Beginnings ===
Dutch colonization efforts in Guyana began in 1580 and resulted in the establishment of the colony of Berbice between 1720 and 1732. Ebenezer Lutheran Church (ELC) was founded on October 15, 1743. It was led by the laity, there being no Lutheran minister available. The church soon established a relationship with the Lutheran church in Amsterdam, upon which it relied to supply pastors. During the next hundred years, the Amsterdam church provided a total of six ministers, but there were often long gaps between the ending of one pastorate and the beginning of the next. Moreover, members of Ebenezer were still required to pay the taxes to support the state-sponsored Dutch Reformed church.

During this early period, Ebenezer did little or no outreach to the indigenous people, an attitude shared by the government. The 1763 slave revolt, in which slaves controlled the colony for 11 months, perhaps contributed to the lack of outreach. Indeed, by 1788 the church operated a slave plantation whose profits went to the Berbice Lutheran Fund.

The congregation erected a church building in Berbice in 1752. In 1795, the congregation's application for land in the new capital, New Amsterdam, was approved, and in 1803, the original church building was reconstructed on that land. That year the British took over the Guyana colonies and initially did not encourage evangelization efforts. This began to change in 1807 with the abolition of the slave trade in the British Empire. However, the members of Ebenezer were still reluctant. In 1828, their pastor, Johannes Vos, was removed from his position by the vestry of the congregation while he was away performing weddings of slaves at Plantation Catharinasburg, Upper Canje.

Due to the severing of ties to the Amsterdam church, Ebenezer was unable to find Lutheran ministers. the congregation first engaged a Presbyterian minister to lead them. From 1841 to 1875, the church used a variety of clergy and came under the control of the Wesleyan church for 23 years. When the Lutherans retook control of the church in 1875, there were only 12 actual Lutherans.

=== Association with American Lutherans ===
In 1878, Reverend Mittelholzer became the pastor, and in 1890, he established a relationship with Lutherans in North America, leading to recognition by the East Pennsylvania Synod of the Evangelical Lutheran General Synod of the United States of America. Mittelholzer was the first indigenous pastor, and toward the end of his pastorate, other congregations were established. Upon Mittelhotzer's death in 1913, ELC petitioned the East Pennsylvania Synod for a pastor. The synod sent a Dr. Stine in response in 1915. On March 25, 1915, the North American church recognized the Guyana church as a mission of what soon was to become the United Lutheran Church in America (ULCA). In January 1916, Missionary White arrived and took charge of the ELC. A stream of missionaries from the U.S. continued from then until the early 1980s.

Charles Bowen was deployed as a missionary to East Indian people in the colony in 1919. He served until his death in 1942. His work led to the development of worship services in Hindi, and to a strategy of training local people to be catechists and for ordination. His son, Aubrey Roy Bowen, became the second indigenous pastor in 1936.

In 1943, on the two hundredth anniversary of ELC's founding, the church began publishing The Southern Cross bimonthly. That same year, a constitution establishing the Evangelical Lutheran Church in British Guiana (ELCBG) was adopted. The new church body had 12 congregations and 804 communicant members. The ELCBG was still highly controlled by the ULCA's Board for Mission, which provided the needed funding. As a result, the ELCBG was regarded in Guyana as a wealthy church.

From 1947 to the 1985, lay missionaries were sent to work alongside the clerical missionaries. From 1947 to 1961, there were two missionaries for each local clergyman. In 1953, for example, there were 11 missionaries compared to 3 locals, although there were also 26 to 30 local catechists on staff. By 1961, there were 7 local clergy, rising to 12 in 1977. The formation of the Lutheran Church in America (LCA) in 1962 resulted in the ELCBG coming under that body's Board of World Missions.

=== Self-sufficiency ===
In 1966, Guyana became an independent nation. That same year, the ELCBG adopted a new constitution and a new name, the Evangelical Lutheran Church in Guyana. In 1972, the number of local clergy equaled the number of missionaries for the first time. The LCA decided that it would be best for the ELCG if the missionary support were gradually withdrawn so that the LCG could become self sufficient. Between 1982 and 1985, all clergy missionaries were withdrawn. The Catechist Training School, in which missionaries served as faculty and which had produced most of the local clergy, was closed in 1972. The inter-Protestant Guyana Extension Seminary was intended to serve similar purposes, but did not adequately provide the needed church workers. As a result, the ELCG's conventions in 1979 and 1980 expressed great concern that the move to self-sufficiency was occurring to quickly. One problem was that the better trained local clergy were leaving Guyana for better paid and less stressful positions elsewhere.

As of 2018, the ELCG has 44 congregations with 1,332 communicant members. Its 9 pastors and 11 deacons were all trained locally. Many of the church leaders have had a semester of theological study at Wartburg Theological Seminary in Dubuque, Iowa, and a basic unit of Clinical Pastoral Education in North America.
