= Costa Rican Lutheran Church =

Lutheran denomination in Costa Rica

The Costa Rican Lutheran Church (Iglesia Luterana Costarricense) is a Lutheran denomination in Costa Rica with about 500 members. It is a member of the Lutheran World Federation, which it joined in 2002. It is also a member of the Communion of Lutheran Churches in Central America and the Ecumenical Council of Churches of Costa Rica.
