= Christian Lutheran Church of Honduras =

Christian denomination in Honduras

- Iglesia Cristiana Luterana de Honduras
- Abbreviation: ICLH
- Classification: Protestant
- Orientation: Lutheran
- President: José Martín Girón
- Associations: Lutheran World Federation
- Region: Honduras
- Headquarters: Comayaguela, Honduras
- Origin: 1983
- Branched from: Lutheran Church–Missouri Synod
- Congregations: 9
- Members: 1,200
- Official website: iclh.wordpress.com

The Christian Lutheran Church of Honduras (Spanish: Iglesia Cristiana Luterana de Honduras, abbreviated ICLH) is a Lutheran denomination in Honduras. Lutheran missions in Honduras began in 1951, when missionaries from El Salvador began ministering in the community of San Nicolás Olancho. Three decades later, in 1981, two Guatemalan missionaries began serving congregations in San Pedro Sula and Tegucigalpa. Two years later, the ICLH was officially founded under the leadership of the Lutheran Church–Missouri Synod. The ICLH joined the Lutheran World Federation in 1994. Today, the church body numbers some 1,200 members in nine congregations.
