= Evangelical Lutheran Church of Cameroon =

Evangelical Lutheran Church in Cameroon
- Logo of the EELC
- Classification: Protestant
- Orientation: Lutheran
- Leader: Rev. Dr. Ruben NGOZO
- Associations: LWF
- Region: Cameroon
- Origin: 1965; Ngaoundéré
- Branched from: Evangelical Lutheran Church of Cameroon and the Central African Republic
- Congregations: 1,300
- Members: 253,000
- Ministers: 147
- Secondary schools: Collège Protestant de Ngaoundéré ( Colprot)
- Official website: http://www.eelc-adc.org/eelc/

The Evangelical Lutheran Church of Cameroon (EELC) (French: L’Eglise Evangélique Luthérienne au Cameroun) is a Lutheran denomination in Cameroon. The EELC was registered as a religious body in Cameroon in 1965 and currently has approximately 253,000 members in 1,300 congregations nationwide.

The current bishop of the EELC is the Rev Dr Ruben Ngozo.

== History ==
The EELC traces its beginnings from the work of independent American mission known as the Sudan Mission led by Adolphus Gunderson and the Norwegian Missionary Society (NMS) led by Jens Nikolaisen in the 1920s. The Sudan Mission established itself among the Gbaya people while the NMS worked among the Mbum people in the Adamawa Region in 1923 and 1925 respectively.

In 1925, both the Sudan Mission and the NMS cooperated in their mission and a hospital was established in Ngaoundéré while a seminary was established in Meiganga.

With a framework of collaboration firmly established, discussions were initiated in 1950 for the establishment of a national church in Cameroon. In 1960, an agreement was reached and the Evangelical Lutheran Church of Cameroon and the Central African Republic French: Eglise Evangélique Luthérienne du Cameroun et de la République Centrafricaine) was established. In 1965, the Church was registered as the Evangelical Lutheran Church of Cameroon and in 1973, the Evangelical Lutheran Church of the Central African Republic formally separated as an independent national church.

== Structure ==
The EELC comprises congregations, districts, parishes and 10 episcopal regions. The overall coordination of the EELC is conducted by the Executive Board (French: Le bureau exécutif) convened by the Bishop. The Executive Board comprises the Bishop, the Assistant Bishop, the Secretary General, the Financial Controller, and the Coordinators of the three National Departments; Evangelisation and Mission, Christian Education, Communications, and Diaconal Services.

The highest decision making body is the General Synod of the EELC, composed of delegates from the various congregations. The General Synod elects a Synodal Council which is led by a lay President.

=== Presidents of the EELC ===
- 1960-1963

Rev Andersen

- 1963-1977

Rev Paul Darman

- 1967-1977

Rev Joseph Medoukan

- 1977-1985

Rev Paul Darman

- 1985-1997

Rev Songsare Amtse Pierre

- 1997-2000

Rev Philemon Barya

- 2000–September 2009

Rev Dr Thomas Nyiwe

=== Bishops of the EELC ===
- 2009 - 2013

Rev Dr Thomas Nyiwe

- 2013 -

Rev Dr Ruben Ngozo

== Medical work ==
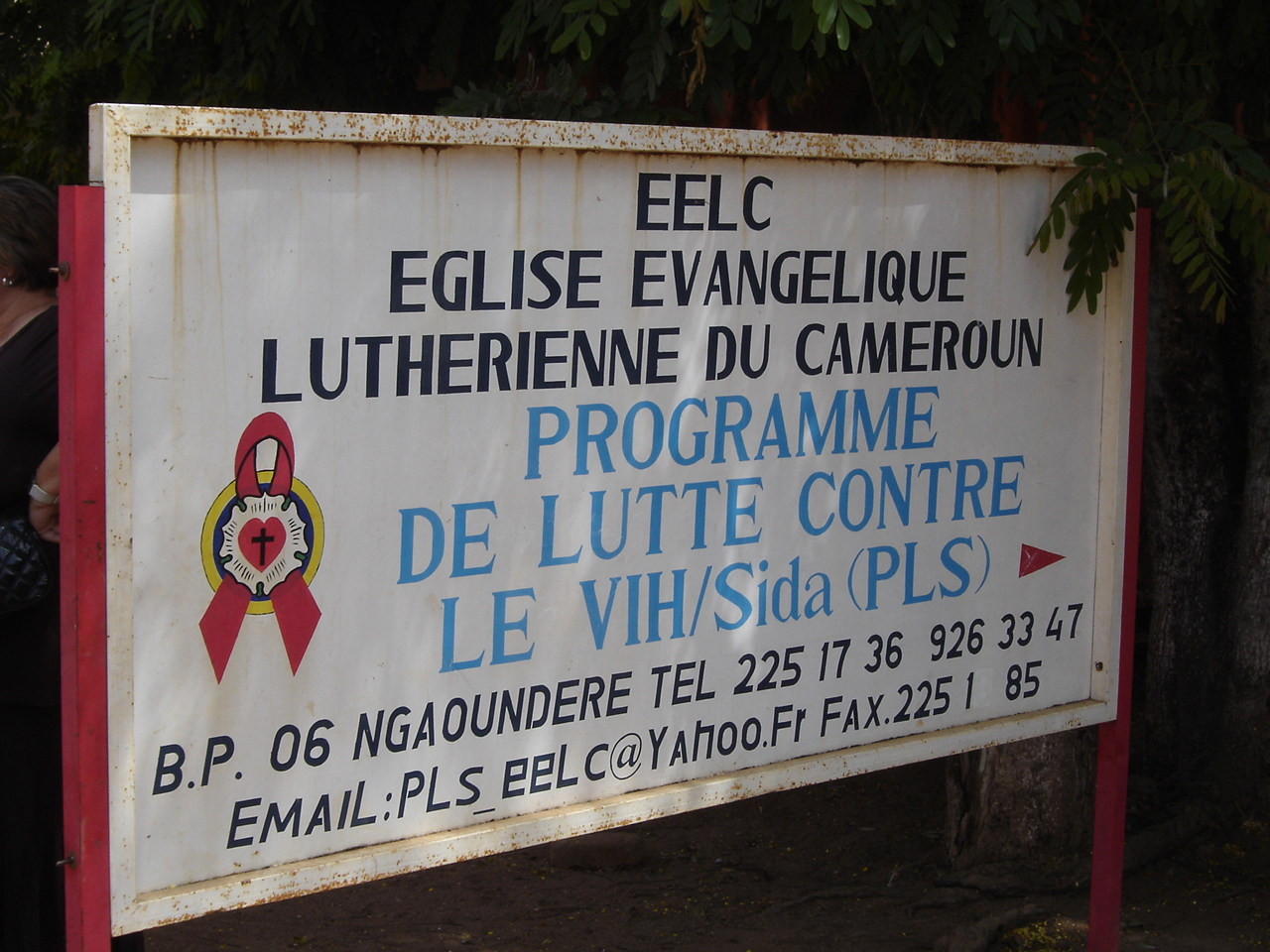
The HIV/AIDS unit run by the EELC

The Evangelical Lutheran Church of Cameroon has been active through much of the twentieth century and has been responsible for collaborating with other institutions to pursue development in Cameroon. One such program in which the church is involved is the Protestant Hospital of Ngaoundéré that was set up in the 1950s. The Health Department of the EELC, (French: Oeuvre de Santé de l’Eglise Evangélique Luthérienne au Cameroun) or OSEELC, is a large and vibrant ministry operating three large hospitals and fifteen health centres.

The three hospitals operated by the EELC are:

- Protestant Hospital of Ngaoundéré
- Protestant Hospital of Garoua-Boulaï
- Protestant Hospital of Ngaoubela

== Bible school and seminaries ==
The ELCC trains pastors, catechists and evangelists in Meiganga's Lutheran Theology Institute. Bible school are found in Tchollire, Garoua-Boulaï, Meng and Poli.

== Affiliations ==
The EELC participates actively in ecumenical work through its affiliation with:

- Lutheran World Federation
  - Lutheran Communion in Western Africa
- Council of Protestant Churches in Cameroon - CEPCA
- Federation of Evangelical Churches and Missions in Cameroon
- Joint Christian Ministry in West Africa
