= Nicaraguan Lutheran Church of Faith and Hope =

Protestant denomination in Nicaragua

The Nicaraguan Lutheran Church of Faith and Hope (Iglesia Luterana de Nicaragua Fe y Esperanza) is a Lutheran denomination in Nicaragua. It is a member of the Lutheran World Federation, which it joined in 1994.
