= Evangelical Lutheran Church in the Republic of Namibia =

Lutheran denomination in Namibia

- Classification: Protestant
- Orientation: Lutheran
- Bishop: Sagues ǀKheib
- Associations: Council of Churches in Namibia; Lutheran World Federation; World Council of Churches
- Origin: 1957
- Congregations: 100
- Members: 600,000
- Official website: www.elcrnam.org

The Evangelical Lutheran Church in the Republic of Namibia (ELCRN; German: Evangelisch-Lutherische Kirche in der Republik Namibia) is a Lutheran denomination based in Namibia. It has 54 parishes, over 100 congregations, and a total membership of about 600,000.

The ELCRN grew out of work done by the Rhenish Missionary Society starting in 1842. The denomination was established in 1957 as the Evangelical Lutheran Church in South West Africa (Rheinische Mission). It adopted its present name in 1990, following Namibian independence. It joined the Lutheran World Federation in 1970, and the World Council of Churches in 1992.

Together with the Evangelical Lutheran Church in Namibia, the ELCRN operates Paulinum Theological Seminary. In 2007, these two denominations. along with the German-speaking Evangelical Lutheran Church in Namibia, formed the United Church Council of the Lutheran Churches in Namibia. The aim of this body is ultimately to achieve church union.

In December 2015, the ELCRN postponed its synod, which usually meets every six years, "pending the rectification of alleged irregularities regarding administrative procedures." The synod took place from 30 January – 4 February 2016, but then the election of members to the national church council was "reportedly conducted improperly as some members with voting rights were denied participation in the election process." The elections were declared null and void and an extraordinary synod was then held in July 2016. No consensus could be reached, however, and the term of the current church council was extended until 31 August 2017.
