= Salvadoran Lutheran Church =

Lutheran denomination in El Salvador

The Salvadoran Lutheran Church (Iglesia Luterana Salvadoreña) is a Lutheran denomination in El Salvador. It is a member of the Lutheran World Federation, which it joined in 1986. It is also a member of the Caribbean Conference of Churches, the Communion of Lutheran Churches in Central America and the World Council of Churches.

The church's first bishop, Medardo Ernesto Gómez Soto, retired in January 2025. He was succeeded by Guadalupe Cortés.
