= Evangelical Lutheran Church of Colombia =

Protestant denomination in Colombia

The Evangelical Lutheran Church of Colombia (Iglesia Evangélica Luterana de Colombia - IELCO) is a Lutheran denomination in Colombia. It is a member of the Lutheran World Federation, which it joined in 1966.

== Education ==
Education has been one of their most important ministerial objectives of the IELCO, taking its charge from Proverbs 22:6. For this reason, the IELCO has included in its work not only Christian and theological education, but also, secular education.
