= Evangelical Lutheran Church in Suriname =

Religious denomination

The Evangelical Lutheran Church in Suriname (Evangelisch Lutherse Kerk in Suriname) is a Lutheran denomination in Suriname. It is a member of the Lutheran World Federation, which it joined in 1979. It is also a member of the Caribbean Conference of Churches.
