= German-speaking Evangelical Lutheran Church in Namibia =

Lutheran denomination based in Namibia

German-speaking Evangelical Lutheran Church in Namibia
- Deutsche Evangelisch-Lutherische Kirche in Namibia
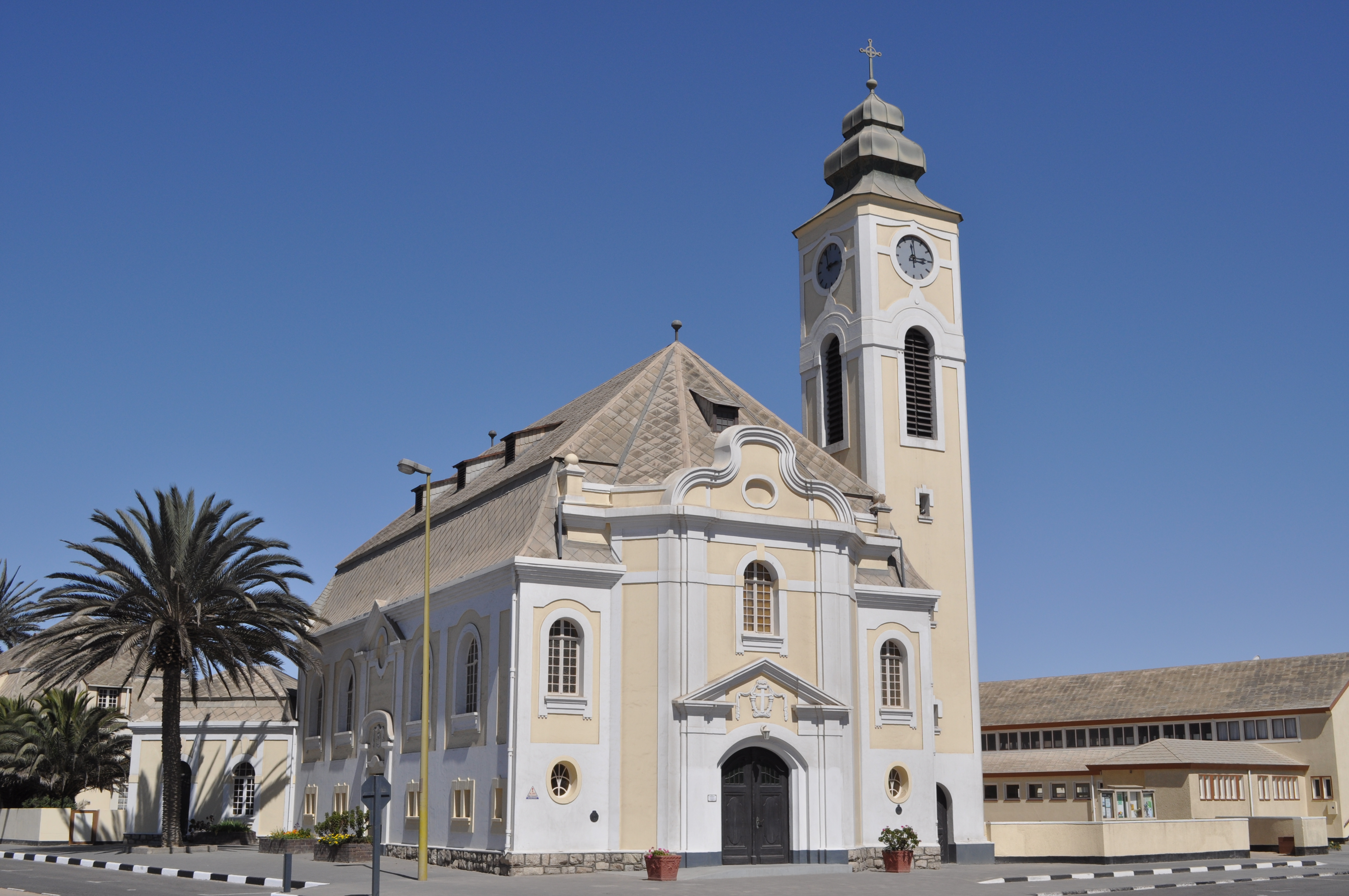
- Local church in Swakopmund
- Abbreviation: ELCIN/GELC
- Associations: Council of Churches in Namibia, Lutheran World Federation
- Language: German
- Headquarters: Windhoek, Namibia
- Territory: Namibia
- Origin: 1960; 66 years ago
- Members: 4,100 (2023)
- Official website: www.elcin-gelc.org

The German-speaking Evangelical Lutheran Church in Namibia (known as GELC or ELCIN) is a Lutheran denomination based in Namibia. It was founded in 1960, and has 4,100 members in 2023.

GELC joined the Lutheran World Federation in 1963. It is also a member of the Council of Churches in Namibia.

Along with the Evangelical Lutheran Church in Namibia and the Evangelical Lutheran Church in the Republic of Namibia, GELC formed the United Church Council of the Lutheran Churches in Namibia in 2007. The aim of this body is ultimately to achieve church union.

== See also ==
- Religion in Namibia
- Evangelical Lutheran Church in the Republic of Namibia German-speaking church
- Evangelical Lutheran Church in Namibia
