= Evangelical Lutheran Church in Southern Africa =

Lutheran Christian denomination in Africa

- Classification: Protestant
- Orientation: Lutheran
- Theology: Lutheran theology
- Polity: Episcopal
- Primate: The Rt. Rev Bishop Myaka
- Associations: Lutheran World Federation, World Council of Churches, South African Council of Churches, All Africa Conference of Churches
- Region: South Africa, Eswatini, Botswana, Lesotho
- Origin: 1975
- Congregations: 2,300 churches
- Members: 589,582 members
- Official website: http://www.elcsa.org.za/home.html

The Evangelical Lutheran Church in Southern Africa (ELCSA) is a Lutheran church in South Africa. The church has 580,000 baptized members in seven dioceses in South Africa, Botswana, and Eswatini, and is (by a wide margin) the largest Lutheran church in the southern African region. It is a member of the Botswana Council of Churches.

The ELCSA was constituted from existing church bodies in 1975, and became a member of the Lutheran World Federation in 1976. The presiding bishop's office is currently held by The Rt Rev Bishop Myaka of the South Eastern Diocese (KwaZulu-Natal Region).

== History ==
A number of regional Lutheran churches in southern Africa began unity discussions in the late 1960s. A 1969 meeting of the Unity Committee made the decision to proceed to merger, with the resulting unified church to be divided into four constituent dioceses. In 1972, the Cape Orange Lutheran Church joined the process, and the number of proposed dioceses was subsequently increased to five.

The first bishop of the ELCSA, Paulus Ben Mhlungu, was consecrated a bishop by Swedish bishop Helge Fosseus on 19 September 1971, bringing the Uppsala Line of apostolic succession into the nascent body.

A constituting assembly was held at Tlhabane, Rustenburg, from 15 to 20 December 1975. This assembly was unexpectedly attacked, with teargas bombs thrown through the windows, resulting in seventeen delegates being hospitalised. During the assembly, on 18 December 1975, the new unified church was formally constituted and named the Evangelical Lutheran Church in Southern Africa. It formally joined the Lutheran World Federation the following year.

== Structure ==
The church practises episcopal polity, with the day to day pastoral and administrative care of each diocese in the hands of its bishop, and the presiding bishop exercising that role nationally. There are seven dioceses. The presiding bishop is elected from amongst the diocesan bishops, and retains his role as ordinary of his diocese, whilst also exercising the authority of metropolitan bishop. The dioceses of the church are:

- Botswana Diocese
- Cape Orange Diocese
- Central Diocese
- Eastern Diocese
- Northern Diocese
- South Eastern Diocese
- Western Diocese

The Kingdom of Lesotho forms an eighth administrative area, but does not have the status of a diocese. It functions as a mission area. It has no bishop, but is entitled to send one lay person and one ordained person to the Church Council.

The main decision making forum of the ELCSA is the General Assembly. All bishops are ex officio members, as are all members of the Church Council. Additionally, there are 84 elected representatives. Each diocese elects 12 representatives (4 clergy and 8 laity) to serve on the General Assembly.

The executive function of ELCSA is vested in the Church Council, a smaller body that can meet more frequently. Again, all bishops are ex officio members, together with two lay members and one ordained member from each of the diocesan synods.

There is also an Episcopal Council, consisting of the bishop of each diocese together with one (elected) ordained pastor from each diocese. The Episcopal Council may meet to consider any decision made by any person, diocese, or committee, including the General Assembly or the Church Council, that it considers to be controversial, divisive, or erroneous. The Episcopal Council has the authority to postpone any decision of any church council or agency until the next meeting of that council or agency in order to promote further reflection and discussion.

== Ethnicity ==
Owing to the complex racial history of the region, the Lutheran churches of southern Africa still experience some degree of racial grouping within denominations. The ELCSA has a predominantly black membership, but actively seeks the full racial integration of Lutheran Christians and denominations in the region. The ELCSA website states, "We are looking forward to a day when all the Lutheran Churches in South Africa will be constituted into one Lutheran Church and be geographically grouped not according to colour and race."

== Contemporary issues ==
In 2005, Bishop Louis Sibiya spoke in support of polygamy and homosexuality, "provided they promote the cause of the Gospel...[saying] 'If a gay presiding bishop would - in our opinion - advance even better the course of the Gospel, let it be so.'"

In 2007, the church received approval to perform same-sex marriages, but it is unclear how many congregations have chosen to do so. In 2015, the ELCSA synod discussed same-sex unions but stated that "a marriage is understood as a union only between a man and a woman. Furthermore the valid and unchanged position of our Church is that the blessing of same sex unions is rejected". However, Bishop Dr. Biyela stated that the ELCSA "embraces homosexuals and allows them to worship in their churches as full members".

== Nelson Mandela ==
During the long period of his incarceration in the Robben Island prison, Nelson Mandela received pastoral care and spiritual counsel from the ELCSA, principally through the offices of Bishop Adalbert Brunke of the Cape Orange diocese, who subsequently received public thanks from President Mandela for his sacrificial ministry.

== See also ==
- List of Lutheran dioceses and archdioceses
