= Evangelical Church of the Augsburg Confession in Slovakia =

Lutheran church in Slovakia

- Classification: Protestant
- Orientation: Lutheran
- Polity: Episcopal-synodical
- Bishop-General: Ivan Eľko
- Associations: Lutheran World Federation; World Council of Churches; Conference of European Churches; Community of Protestant Churches in Europe
- Region: Slovakia
- Origin: 1918
- Separated from: Evangelical-Lutheran Church in Hungary
- Congregations: 326
- Members: 286,907
- Official website: https://www.ecav.sk/

The Evangelical Church of the Augsburg Confession in Slovakia (in Slovak Evanjelická cirkev augsburského vyznania na Slovensku, ECAV) is the only Lutheran church in Slovakia. The Church is a member of the Ecumenical Council of Churches in Slovakia, and the Lutheran World Federation (Central Eastern Europe Region).

== History of the church ==
The church was established in 1918 following the dissolution of the Austro-Hungarian Empire. The church opposed the Nazis in World War II. After the Communist coup d'état of 1948, the Lutheran Church lost control over its schools and social services, and many church periodicals ceased to be published. More than one hundred clergy were persecuted; many were imprisoned and restrained from exercising their ministry. Until 1989 the Church lived under the strict control of the regime and in 1993 the Synod adopted a new constitution.

== Number of adherents and beliefs ==
The ECAV is the second largest church in Slovakia. It considers the Gospel as contained in the Bible to be the source of faith in the triune God and the rule for life. Jesus is regarded as the head of the Church and it functions on the basis of the equality of God's children. The Augsburg Confession is recognized as a correct explanation of central issues of faith. Women can be ordained pastors.

At present there are 326 congregations grouped into 14 conferences (seniorats), and two districts: the East and the West Districts. There are about 361 active clergy. The Church administers 686 functional churches and ecclesiastical buildings.

== Relations with other churches ==
In addition to its membership of the Lutheran World Federation, World Council of Churches. the Conference of European Churches, and the Community of Protestant Churches in Europe, the church maintains relations with other Lutheran and Slovak Lutheran bodies including:

- Evangelical-Lutheran Church in Württemberg
- Evangelical Church in Central Germany
- Evangelical Church of the Augsburg Confession in Austria
- Evangelical Church of Czech Brethren
- Silesian Evangelical Church of the Augsburg Confession
- Slovak Evangelical Church of the Augsburg Confession in Serbia
- Evangelical Lutheran Church of Ingria
- Evangelical Lutheran Church in America (Slovak Zion Synod)
- Lutheran Church–Missouri Synod (Slovak Evangelical Lutheran Church)
- Diocese of Härnösand
- Ethiopian Evangelical Church Mekane Yesus
- Evangelical Lutheran Church in Malawi
- Evangelical Church of the Augsburg Confession in Poland
- Evangelical-Lutheran Church in Hungary
- Evangelical Church in the Republic of Croatia
- Evangelical Church of the Augsburg Confession in Slovenia
