= Bolivian Evangelical Lutheran Church =

Protestant-oriented Christian denomination in Bolivia

- Logo of the Bolivian Evangelical Lutheran Church.
- Classification: Protestant
- Orientation: Lutheranism
- Polity: Episcopal
- President: Rev. Freddy Choque
- Associations: World Council of Churches, Lutheran World Federation, Latin American Council of Churches
- Region: Bolivia
- Founder: Founded by Lutheran missionaries from the World Mission Prayer League in the United States.
- Origin: 1972; Mocomoco
- Separated from: World Mission Prayer League
- Congregations: 107
- Members: 8,526 baptized
- Ministers: 30 (Ordained)
- Official website: http://www.ielbbolivia.org.bo/

The Bolivian Evangelical Lutheran Church (Spanish: Iglesia Evangélica Luterana Boliviana (IELB) is a Protestant Church denomination located in Bolivia that professes the Lutheran branch of Christianity. Formed in 1972 by Lutheran missionaries from the United States, the church takes its members primarily and entirely from the indigenous people of Bolivia such as the Aymara and Quechua, with its members scattered across the Bolivian highlands and in and around La Paz.

== History ==
The Bolivian Evangelical Lutheran Church was founded by Lutheran missionaries from the United States working amongst the indigenous peoples of the Americas who generally have belonged to the poorest sectors of society and In Bolivia, where in some cases more than in any other Latin American country, the indigenous peoples have been marginalized and have suffered from exclusion by the Mestizos. It is only in recent years that they have become better organized and are able to claim their rights and participation in society. As the missionaries, who generally ran the day-to-day affairs of the young church, left in 1972, the local indigenous people claimed greater participation in the decision-making bodies of the church. The Bolivian Evangelical Lutheran Church was constituted that same year and since then it has become the largest Amerindian Lutheran church on the continent of South America. Despite this success the socio-economic and political situation of Bolivia still remains particularly burdening to the ministry of the church.

== Purpose ==
The IELB considers its main priority is to promote a holistic approach to evangelism and service. The church is involved in a variety of projects: alternative agriculture, animal husbandry, provision of drinking water, educational campaigns to prevent cholera, formal education (elementary school), vocational training, and communication. All these projects are planned with the communities and respond to their needs; at the same time, they provide good opportunities to introduce the gospel in a natural way to the communities involved. At the same time, the church is aiming to strengthen its institutional presence within the Bolivian context. Important contacts and even agreements in the field of education have been achieved in the past years with the Bolivian government.

== Church Governance ==
The highest decision-making authority of the church is the assembly. It elects the twelve members of the board which, through its chairpersons, exercises legislative, executive and judicial authority. The work is organized in three departments: evangelism, communication, education, health and social development.
