= Communion of Protestant Churches in Europe =

Fellowship of Protestant churches

- Gemeinschaft Evangelischer Kirchen in Europa; Communion d'Églises protestantes en Europe
- Abbreviation: CPCE, GEKE, CEPE
- Type: Communion
- Classification: Protestant
- Orientation: Lutheran; Reformed; Methodist; Calvinistic Methodist; Waldensian; Hussite
- Leader: Presidium
- Region: Europe
- Headquarters: Vienna, Austria
- Official website: https://www.leuenberg.eu/

The Communion of Protestant Churches in Europe (CPCE; German: Gemeinschaft Evangelischer Kirchen in Europa, GEKE) is a fellowship of over 100 Protestant churches which have signed the Leuenberg Agreement. Together they strive for realizing church communion, especially by cooperation in witness and service to the world. Prior to 2003 the CPCE was known as the "Leuenberg Church Fellowship".

In membership are most Lutheran and Reformed churches in Europe, the united churches that originated from mergers of those churches, and such pre-Reformation churches as the Waldensians. The European Methodist churches joined the CPCE by a common declaration of church fellowship in 1997.

The General Secretary of the CPCE is Mario Fischer. The Community's offices are located in Vienna, Austria, and are shared with those of the Protestant Church of the Augsburg Confession in Austria.

== History ==
In 1973, theologians from major European Lutheran and Reformed churches met at the Swiss conference centre Leuenberg (near Basel) and finalized the Leuenberg Agreement or Leuenberg Concord, an ecumenical document declaring unity through Jesus Christ. Under this agreement the churches agree on a common understanding of the Gospel, including elementary agreement on important doctrines including christology, predestination, Eucharist and justification. They declare church fellowship, understood as pulpit and table fellowship as well as full communion in witness and service.

The churches involved were originally joined by an organization called the "Leuenberg Church Fellowship". In 2003 this was renamed the "Community (since 2020: "Communion") of Protestant Churches in Europe" as a sign of growing beyond the Lutheran and Reformed traditions, and now includes several Methodist churches. Since then, the CPCE has started ecumenical dialogue with Anglican, Baptist, and Orthodox churches.

In 2006, the CPCE published a statute of church constitution, and in 2011 published new guidelines for churches wishing to join. This declaration made clear that "churches wishing to join recognize the ordination and ministry of women ministers in other CPCE churches".

== Member churches ==
=== European countries ===
- Iceland
  - Church of Iceland
- Norway
  - Church of Norway
- Denmark
  - Church of Denmark
  - Reformed Synod of Denmark
- United Kingdom
  - Church of Scotland
  - German-Speaking Evangelical-Lutheran Synod in Great Britain
  - Presbyterian Church of Wales
  - Methodist Church in Ireland
  - Methodist Church of Great Britain
  - United Free Church of Scotland
  - United Reformed Church
- Ireland
  - Lutheran Church in Ireland
  - Presbyterian Church in Ireland
- Netherland
  - Protestant Church in the Netherlands
  - Remonstrant Brotherhood
- Luxembourg
  - Protestant Church of Luxembourg
  - Protestant Reformed Church of Luxembourg
- Austria
  - Protestant Church of the Augsburg Confession in Austria
  - Reformed Church in Austria
- Liechtenstein
  - Evangelical Church in Liechtenstein
- Germany
  - Protestant Church in Germany
  - Evangelical Reformed Church in Germany
  - Union of Protestant Churches in the EKD
  - Conference of Churches on the Rhine
  - Federation of Evangelical Reformed Churches of Germany
  - Evangelical Lutheran Church in Northern Germany
  - Evangelical Lutheran Church of Mecklenburg
  - Pomeranian Evangelical Church
  - Evangelical Lutheran Church in Oldenburg
  - Evangelical Lutheran Church in Bavaria
  - Evangelical Church of Bremen
  - Evangelical Church in Berlin, Brandenburg and Silesian Upper Lusatia
  - Protestant Church of Anhalt
  - Evangelical Church in Central Germany
  - Evangelical Lutheran Church in Brunswick
  - Evangelical-Lutheran Church of Hanover
  - Evangelical Lutheran Church of Schaumburg-Lippe
  - Church of Lippe
  - Evangelical Church of Westphalia
  - Evangelical-Lutheran Church of Saxony
  - Evangelical Church of Hesse Electorate-Waldeck
  - Protestant Church in Hesse and Nassau
  - Evangelical Church in the Rhineland
  - Walloon Dutch Church, Hanau
  - Evangelical Church of the Palatinate
  - Protestant Church in Baden
  - Evangelical-Lutheran Church in Württemberg
  - Evangelical Reformed Church in Bavaria and Northwestern Germany
  - Evangelical Lutheran Church of Lithuania in Exile (Germany)
- Switzerland
  - Protestant Church of Switzerland
  - Federation of Evangelical Lutheran Churches in Switzerland and the Principality of Liechtenstein
- France
  - United Protestant Church of France
    - Evangelical Lutheran Church of France
    - Reformed Church of France
  - Union of Protestant Churches of Alsace and Lorraine
    - Protestant Reformed Church of Alsace and Lorraine
    - Protestant Church of Augsburg Confession of Alsace and Lorraine
- Belgium
  - United Protestant Church in Belgium
- Spain
  - Spanish Evangelical Church
- Portugal
  - Evangelical Methodist Church of Portugal
  - Evangelical Presbyterian Church of Portugal
- Italy
  - Union of Methodist and Waldensian Churches
    - Waldensian Evangelical Church
    - Methodist Church in Italy
  - Lutheran Evangelical Church in Italy
- Romania
  - Evangelical Lutheran Church of Romania
  - Reformed Church in Romania
    - Reformed Diocese of Királyhágómellék
    - Reformed Diocese of Transylvania
  - Evangelical Church of Augustan Confession in Romania
- Greece
  - Greek Evangelical Church
  - German-speaking Protestant Church in Greece
- Croatia
  - Evangelical Church in the Republic of Croatia
  - Reformed Christian Calvinist Church in Croatia
- Slovenia
  - Evangelical Church of Slovenia
- Serbia
  - Slovak Evangelical Church of the Augsburg Confession in Serbia
  - Reformed Christian Church in Serbia
- Hungary
  - Evangelical-Lutheran Church in Hungary
  - Reformed Church in Hungary
- Slovakia
  - Evangelical Church of the Augsburg Confession in Slovakia
  - Reformed Christian Church in Slovakia
- Czech Republic
  - Czechoslovak Hussite Church
  - Church of the Brethren in the Czech Republic
  - Evangelical Church of Czech Brethren
  - Silesian Evangelical Church of the Augsburg Confession
- Poland
  - Polish Reformed Church
  - Evangelical Church of the Augsburg Confession in Poland
- Ukraine
  - Reformed Church in Transcarpathia
- Russia
  - Evangelical Lutheran Church in Russia, Ukraine, Kazakhstan and Central Asia
- Estonia
  - Estonian Evangelical Lutheran Church
- Latvia
  - German Evangelical Lutheran Church of Latvia
- Lithuania
  - Evangelical Lutheran Church in Lithuania
  - Lithuanian Evangelical Reformed Church

=== Other countries ===
- Argentina
  - United Evangelical Lutheran Church in Argentina
  - Evangelical Methodist Church in Argentina
  - Reformed Church of Argentina
- Argentina – Uruguay – Paraguay
  - Waldensian Church of the River Plate
  - Evangelical Church of the River Plate
- Ecuador
  - Iglesia Evangélica Luterana del Ecuador (Evangelical Lutheran church of Ecuador)

=== International churches ===
- United Methodist Church
  - Central and Southern Europe Central Conference
  - Germany Central Conference
  - Northern Europe Central Conference
  - United Methodist church, Nordic and Baltic Area
  - United Methodist Church Eurasia Episcopal Area
- Moravian Church
- Latvian Evangelical Lutheran Church Abroad

=== Participating churches ===
- Sweden
  - Church of Sweden
  - Uniting Church in Sweden (part of the Swedish Free Church Council)
- Finland
  - Evangelical Lutheran Church of Finland

=== Former members ===
- Latvia
  - Evangelical Lutheran Church of Latvia (until 2021)

== See also ==
- Porvoo Communion
