= Kinki Evangelical Lutheran Church =

Lutheran church in Japan

- Logo of the KELC
- Classification: Protestant
- Orientation: Pietist Lutheran
- Leader: The Rev. Shigeo Sueoka
- Associations: Lutheran World Federation, Asian Lutheran Communion
- Region: Japan
- Origin: 1951; Osaka, Japan
- Branched from: Norwegian Missionary Society, Evangelical Lutheran Free Church of Norway Japan Mission
- Congregations: 29
- Members: 2,600 baptized
- Official website: www.kelc.net

The Kinki Evangelical Lutheran Church (近畿福音ルーテル教会, Kinki Fukuin Rūteru Kyōkai) or KELC is a Lutheran church in Japan. It currently has approximately 2,600 baptized members in 29 congregations nationwide.

The current president is the Rev Shigeo Sueoka.

== History ==
The KELC traces its history to the eviction of foreign Christian missionaries from mainland China in the 1950s after the establishment of the People's Republic of China. In 1951, missionaries from the Norwegian Missionary Society (NMS) and the Evangelical Lutheran Free Church of Norway (LFCN) established a mission in Japan, primarily in the Kinki region.

On November 3, 1961, 14 congregations planted by the NMS and LFCN organised themselves as the KELC. In 1976, the KELC was accepted as a full member of the Lutheran World Federation. The KELC was officially recognized as a religious body in 1980.

== Structure and organization ==
=== Congregations by prefectures ===
- Hyōgo Prefecture

Congregations in the cities of Amagasaki, Kawanishi, Kobe, Sanda and Takarazuka

- Osaka Prefecture

Congregations in the cities of Hannan, Izumisano, Osaka, Sakai, and Yao

- Wakayama Prefecture

Congregations in the cities of Kainan, and Wakayama as well as the town of Misato

- Nara Prefecture

Congregations in the cities of Nara, Sakurai and Kashihara

- Mie Prefecture

Congregations in the cities of Shima, and Tsu

== Ministries ==
Some KELC local congregations operate kindergartens and nursery schools. The KELC also sponsors the Kobe Lutheran Theological Seminary together with the West Japan Evangelical Lutheran Church.

== Affiliations & cooperation ==
The work of Lutheran missionaries resulted in the establishment of five major Lutheran church bodies and a number of smaller ones, with a total membership of approximately 30,000. The largest of these, with about 20,000 members, is the Japan Evangelical Lutheran Church. Other Lutheran churches include the Japan Lutheran Church, the West Japan Evangelical Lutheran Church, the Japan Lutheran Brethren Church, the Lutheran Evangelical Christian Church and the Fellowship Deaconry Evangelical Church (Marburger Mission).

Cooperation among the various Lutheran churches in Japan is common, particularly with respect to outreach ministries. Church planting plans are mutually shared in order to avoid duplications. Most of the Lutheran churches have also joined together to form the Lutheran Literature Society (聖文舎, Seibunsha), which publishes Christian books and materials; one notable endeavor being in the publication of a common Lutheran hymnal.

The KELC is also a full member of the Lutheran World Federation and is cooperates with the Norwegian Missionary Society and the Evangelical Lutheran Free Church of Norway Japan Mission.

== See also ==
- Christianity in Japan
- Protestantism in Japan
