= Evangelical Lutheran Church in Ecuador =

Church in Ecuador

The Evangelical Lutheran Church in Ecuador (Iglesia Evangélica Luterana en el Ecuador) is a Lutheran denomination in Ecuador. It is a member of the Lutheran World Federation, which it joined in 1957. It is a member of the Latin American Council of Churches.
