= Tsung Tsin Mission of Hong Kong =

Lutheran church in Hong Kong

- Logo of the TTMHK
- Classification: Protestant
- Orientation: Lutheran, Reformed
- Leader: Elder Wong Fook Yee
- Associations: LWF, ALC, HKLF, HKCC
- Region: Hong Kong, China
- Origin: 1847
- Separated from: Yuexi Synod, Lutheran Church of China
- Branched from: Basel Missionary Society
- Congregations: 22
- Members: 10,600
- Primary schools: 4
- Secondary schools: 6

The Tsung Tsin Mission of Hong Kong or TTMHK (Chinese: 基督教香港崇真會) is one of the eight Lutheran bodies in Hong Kong. It currently has approximately 10,600 members.

The current president of TTMHK is Elder Wong Fook Yee.

== History ==
The TTMHK was established in its current form in 1952, although it traces its establishment back to the first Basel missions among the Hakkas in Guangdong, China, in 1847. Prior to its reorganisation as an independent body, the TTMHK was one of the twenty-five districts of the Yuexi Synod (Chongzhen Church) of the Lutheran Church of China.

=== Early history ===
Mission work among the Hakka people in Guangdong was initiated with the arrival of Theodore Hamberg and Rudolph Lechler of the Basel Mission in Hong Kong under the guidance of Karl Gützlaff on March 19, 1847. While missionary work was primarily done in the western part of Guangdong, the mission had its home base in Hong Kong.

Christian services in the Hakka language began in Hong Kong on February 9, 1851, and the first baptism took place on April 13 of the same year. In 1860, a residential hall and girls' school was established in Sai Ying Pun on Hong Kong Island. A congregation was eventually established in Sai Ying Pun in 1867 which became the mission centre of the Basel Mission in China and is today known as the Kau Yan Church (Chinese: 救恩堂 or Saving Grace Church).

The first Basel church in Hong Kong Island, however, was established in 1862 in Shau Kei Wan. The first Basel church in Kowloon was established in 1897 in Sham Shui Po, while her first church in the New Territories was established in 1905.

=== Towards self reliance and self governance ===
In 1924, the Basel Church in China renamed itself the Chongzhen Church (Chinese: 崇真會) although the official name in English retained the "Mission" nomenclature. By 1929, the Hong Kong district of the Chongzhen Church had established self-sufficiency and self-governance while retaining ties with the main Chongzhen Church.

In 1949, the Chongzhen Church joined the Lutheran Church of China (LCC) as the Yuedong Synod (Chinese: 粵东區會), but the association with the LCC proved to be short as the political circumstances in China changed rapidly over the following two years. The Yuedong Synod was abolished the following year by the LCC which was transitioning rapidly into the Three Self Patriotic Movement.

=== Independence and consolidation ===
As a result of the communist takeover, the Hong Kong district of the Chongzhen Church was no longer able to keep in contact with the Chongzhen Church in the mainland, and in 1951, ties were officially severed between the district and the Chongzhen Church in China. In 1952, the Hong Kong district of the Chongzhen Church registered itself as an independent organisation using its present name with the Government of Hong Kong and had its first post-registration assembly on 1 July 1957.

In 1954, TTMHK became a founding member of the Hong Kong Christian Council (HKCC) as part of the Lutheran Church in Hong Kong. In 1956, the TTMHK became an independent member of the HKCC in its own right. It also helped set up the Lutheran Church of China - Hong Kong Association (later the Hong Kong Lutheran Federation) in 1954 and in 1974 became a member of the Lutheran World Federation.

== Beliefs and practices ==
The TTMHK is a member church of the Lutheran World Federation, a communion of Lutheran churches throughout the world. As a church in the Lutheran tradition, it accepts the teachings found in the unaltered Augsburg Confession, Luther's Small Catechism and other confessional articles and symbols of the Book of Concord. Owing to its Basel heritage, the TTMHK also accepts the teachings found in the Heidelberg Catechism.

The TTMHK accepts the ordination of women as co-workers and pastors in the denomination, and a significant percentage of their full-time workers are women.

== Structure and organisation ==
The TTMHK is organised along presbyterian lines with Reformed liturgy predominating but theologically Lutheran.

== Schools and colleges ==
The Chongzhen Church had earlier established the Lok Yuk Seminary in Meixian, Guangdong, but the seminary was forced to close in 1952. The Luk Yok Seminary re-opened in Hong Kong in 1955 and was later merged with the Chung Chi Theological Seminary in 1966. Chung Chi Seminary was eventually reorganised as the Divinity School of Chung Chi College of the Chinese University of Hong Kong. In 1977, the TTMHK co-founded the Lutheran Theological Seminary in Hong Kong together with the Chinese Rhenish Church Hong Kong Synod, the Evangelical Lutheran Church of Hong Kong and the Taiwan Lutheran Church.

The Basel Mission had traditionally invested a lot in education and this legacy is carried on by the TTMHK. The TTMHK currently sponsors or runs six secondary schools, four primary school and multiple kindergartens.

== See also ==
- Lutheran Church of China
- Christianity in Hong Kong
