= JELC =

JELC may refer to:

- Jeypore Evangelical Lutheran Church
- Japan Evangelical Lutheran Church
