= Japan Evangelical Lutheran Church =

Church in Japan

- Logo of the JELC
- Classification: Protestant
- Orientation: Lutheran
- Leader: The Rev. Sumiyuki Watanabe
- Associations: Lutheran World Federation, Asian Lutheran Communion, National Christian Council in Japan, Christian Conference of Asia, World Council of Churches
- Region: Japan
- Origin: 1898; Kumamoto, Kumamoto, Japan
- Congregations: 122
- Members: 21,990 baptized
- Official website: www.jelc.or.jp

The Japan Evangelical Lutheran Church (日本福音ルーテル教会, Nihon Fukuin Rūteru Kyōkai) or JELC is a Lutheran church in Japan. It currently has approximately 21,990 baptized members in 122 congregations nationwide.

The current president of the JELC is the Rev Sumiyuki Watanabe.

== History ==
=== Early history ===
The beginnings of the JELC go back to 1892 when the first missionaries to Japan were sent by the United Synod of the South, a predecessor of the Lutheran Church in America, arrived in Yokohama. The first worship service in Japan was observed on Easter Sunday of 1893 in the city of Saga on the island of Kyūshū under the leadership of James Augustin Brown Scherer and R. B. Peery assisted by a Japanese co-worker, Ryohei Yamanouchi.

The first 16 believers were baptised within the first 2 years of the work and by 1898, the JELC was organized with 60 baptised members with the city of Kumamoto becoming the center of Japanese Lutheranism. The first expatriate workers were soon joined by missionaries from the American Danish Lutheran Church (1898) and Finland (1900). The first church building was also consecrated in the city of Saga in 1900.

In 1909, the Lutheran Theological Seminary was established in Kumamoto to train national workers and by 1920 congregations were being established in major cities like Tokyo, Osaka, and Kobe. In 1925, the Lutheran Theological Seminary was transferred to Nakano, Tokyo.

=== Second World War ===
Shortly before the outbreak of the Second World War, the United Church of Christ in Japan (日本キリスト教団, Nihon Kirisuto Kyoudan) (UCCJ) was formed under state pressure and all Protestant denominations were forced to merge with this new body. All foreign missionaries were expelled from the country and some churches were closed in this period. The JELC ceased to exist and only reconstituted themselves upon the end of the war.

=== Post war period ===
The end of the Second World War saw an influx of foreign missionaries, particularly from the United States. As many as 12 different Lutheran denominations and mission societies established work in Japan. Former Lutheran members from the UCCJ met in Kamamoto in 1947 and decided to withdraw from the UCCJ and re-establish the JELC.

The JELC worked in close cooperation with many of the mission agencies and in 1963, the Tokai Lutheran Mission of the Evangelical Lutheran Church merged with the JELC. In 1969, the Lutheran Theological Seminary was moved to Mitaka, Tokyo and in the same year the JELC embarked on a 5-year plan to achieve self-sufficiency and by 1974, the goals set forth had generally been achieved.

=== Current developments ===
In 1993, a Mission Centennial Assembly was held in Kumamoto. Despite having a comparatively small membership with most congregations having less than 50 members, the JELC has sent successive missionaries to serve among Japanese immigrants in Brazil, serving with the Evangelical Church of the Lutheran Confession in Brazil, as well as to the United States among expatriate Japanese.

A ten-year evangelism and church restructuring program known as Power Mission 21 was adopted in 2002 to move the JELC into a new era of true independence through structural reformation and a renewed emphasis on evangelism. This includes an emphasis on youth evangelism as well as fostering the Christian growth of youth, the strengthening of the laity and lay led evangelism, clergy continuing education and a program for clergy review, as well as church/congregational restructuring in order to strengthen outreach.

== Structure and organization ==
The current president of the JELC is the Rev. Masatoshi Yamanouchi who formerly served as the Executive Director of the JELC. The JELC is divided into 5 regional districts which are further subdivided into geographical areas and institutions.

=== List of districts ===
- Kyūshū District ^{link}

Congregations in the prefectures of Fukuoka, Kumamoto, Saga, Nagasaki, Ōita, Miyazaki, and Kagoshima

- Western District ^{link}

Congregations in the prefectures of Kyoto, Osaka, Hyōgo, Okayama, Hiroshima, Shimane, Kagawa, Ehime, and Yamaguchi

- Tokai District ^{link}

Congregations in the prefectures of Shizuoka, Aichi, and Gifu

- Eastern District ^{link}

Congregations in the prefectures of Miyagi, Chiba, Tokyo, Kanagawa, Yamanashi, and Nagano

- Hokkaido District ^{link}

Congregations in the prefecture of Hokkaidō

== Ministries ==
Throughout the history of the JELC, education has been emphasized along with evangelism. Social welfare has also long been an important part of the JELC's work.

=== Education ===
- Kyūshū District

- Kyushu Gakuin Junior & Senior High School, Kumamoto, Kyūshū

Established in 1911 for the training of pastors and the education of young men. Became co-educational in 1991

- Luther Junior & Senior High School, Kumamoto, Kyūshū

Established in 1924 for the education of young women. Became co-educational in 2001

- Kyushu Lutheran College, Kumamoto, Kyūshū

Established in 1975 as the Kyushu Women's Junior College. Received accreditation as a four-year college in 1997

- Eastern District

- Japan Lutheran College, Mitaka, Tokyo

Established in 1909 as the Lutheran Theological Seminary in Kumamoto, Kyūshū. Relocated to Tokyo in 1925 and received accreditation as a four-year college in 1964. In 1996, the college is renamed Japan Lutheran College and the seminary administered as a separate entity.

- Japan Lutheran Theological Seminary, Mitaka, Tokyo

Originally part of the original Lutheran Theological Seminary, it merged with the School of Theology established by the Japan Lutheran Church and has been administered separately as the Japan Lutheran Theological Seminary since 1996.

Many local congregations in all districts serve their communities through Christian kindergartens and nursery schools.

=== Social welfare ===
Social welfare has long been an important part of Japan Evangelical Lutheran Church. Two institutions, Jiai-en (House of Mercy) in Kumamoto and The Tokyo Home for the Elderly in Tokyo, have been leading pioneers in the field of social work in Japan. The Kamagasaki Diaconia Center in the slums of Osaka includes child care, mutual learning, problem study, and community projects.

== Affiliations ==
=== Ecumenism ===
The JELC participates in ecumenical relationships through:

- National Christian Council in Japan

- Christian Conference of Asia
- World Council of Churches

- Lutheran World Federation

- Asian Lutheran Communion

The JELC also works in partnership with:

- Evangelical Lutheran Church in America

- South Carolina Synod

=== Relationship with other Lutheran churches ===
The work of Lutheran missionaries resulted in the establishment of five major Lutheran church bodies and a number of smaller ones, with a total membership of approximately 30,000. The largest of these, with about 20,000 members, is the JELC. Other Lutheran churches include the Kinki Evangelical Lutheran Church, the West Japan Evangelical Lutheran Church, the Japan Lutheran Brethren Church, the Lutheran Evangelical Christian Church and the Fellowship Deaconry Evangelical Church (Marburger Mission and Liberty Corner Mission).

Cooperation among the various Lutheran churches in Japan is common, particularly with respect to outreach ministries. Church planting plans are mutually shared in order to avoid duplications. Most of the Lutheran churches have also joined together to form the Lutheran Literature Society (成文社, Seibunsha), which publishes Christian books and materials; one notable endeavor being in the publication of a common Lutheran hymnal.

The NRK and the JELC sponsor a joint seminary in Tokyo, the Japan Lutheran Theological Seminary whilst the other Lutheran seminary in Kobe is sponsored by the Kinki Evangelical Lutheran Church and the West Japan Evangelical Lutheran Church.

== See also ==
- Christianity in Japan
- Protestantism in Japan
- Japan Evangelical Lutheran Kumamoto Church
