= Evangelical Church of the River Plate =

Protestant church body in Argentina, Paraguay and Uruguay

- Iglesia Evangélica del Río de la Plata
- Abbreviation: IERP
- Classification: Protestant
- Orientation: United church
- President: David Cirigliano
- Associations: Community of Protestant Churches in Europe, Latin American Council of Churches, Lutheran World Federation (1991), World Communion of Reformed Churches, World Council of Churches (1956)
- Region: Argentina, Paraguay, and Uruguay
- Headquarters: Buenos Aires
- Branched from: Evangelical Church in Germany
- Congregations: 45
- Members: 20,000
- Official website: http://ierp.org.ar/

The Evangelical Church of the River Plate (Spanish: Iglesia Evangélica del Río de la Plata, or IERP) is a United, Protestant denomination with congregations in Argentina, Paraguay, and Uruguay. It is named after the Río de la Plata Basin, where the majority of its congregations are located. The denomination is a member of the World Council of Churches and the Lutheran World Federation.

== History ==
The church has its origins in the founding of the first German Evangelical Congregation in Buenos Aires in 1843. Other churches were founded in Montevideo (Uruguay) in 1846 and in Asunción (Paraguay) in 1899.

The Evangelical Church of the River Plate was known as the German Evangelical La Plata Synod (Deutsche Evangelische La Plata Synode) since 1899, with the most of its membership coming from German-speaking countries. Its origins go back to the union of reformed and Lutheran Christians in Germany, occurred in Germany during the 19th century.

The IERP was affiliated with the Evangelical Church in Germany from 1934–1965, when it became independent.

In 1995 the Swiss Evangelical Church in Argentina—with 600 members, 1 congregation and several house fellowships—become affiliated with the denomination.

According to a church census, in 2025 it will have 45 churches and 20,000 members.

== Beliefs ==
It is a Protestant church, and the basis of its faith are the Holy Scriptures, with the message of God and its live in Earth in the person of Jesus Christ. As confessional ground it includes the Apostles' Creed, the Nicene Creed, the Athanasian Creed the Reformed Heidelberg Catechism, Luther's Small Catechism, and the Augsburg Confession. It also accepts the Barmen Declaration and the Leuenberg Agreement.

The church ordains women as ministers.

=== Marriage ===
A 2010 resolution allows local churches to decide about blessings of same-sex marriage.

== Ecumenism ==
The IERP is involved in several ecumenical bodies such as the Ecumenical Human Rights Movement, Uprooted People and Refugee Ecumenical Service and ISEDET (Ecumenical Theological University) in Argentina, emergency aid in Paraguay, human rights in Uruguay. The signing of the Leuenberg Agreement has helped the IERP to improve its relations with other churches, e.g. the United Evangelical Lutheran Church (IELU), the Waldensian Evangelical Church of the River Plate and the Reformed Churches in Argentina. The IERP has mutual recognition of ministries with the Methodist Church, the Disciples of Christ and the Presbyterian Church and the Federation of Swiss Protestant Churches. The church is a member of the World Communion of Reformed Churches.
