= Lutheranism in Mexico =

Christian denomination in Mexico

Lutheranism was first introduced to Mexico in the 1850s, when German-American Lutherans began serving German immigrants in Mexico, though mission work among the non-German population in Mexico did not begin until the 1940s. Today there are five Lutheran church bodies in Mexico—the Mexican Lutheran Church (affiliated with the Lutheran World Federation), the Lutheran Synod of Mexico (affiliated with the International Lutheran Council), the Confessional Evangelical Lutheran Church—Mexico (affiliated with the Confessional Evangelical Lutheran Conference), the Evangelical Lutheran Church of Mexico (unaffiliated), and the Lutheran Apostolic Alliance of Mexico (unaffiliated)—and several independent congregations.

== History ==
Beginning in the 1850s and extending into the 20th century, German-American Lutherans sent aid to the German Lutheran immigrants in Mexico, though they did not attempt any mission work among the non-German population in Mexico. As a result, the Lutheran Church in Mexico remained small throughout this period, numbering only 1,000 members in the 1910s. The Lutheran Church—Missouri Synod (LCMS) began German and English mission work in Mexico in 1922, though it was forced to abandon these efforts in 1931. The LCMS resumed its missionary efforts in 1940, this time in Spanish, under the name, "the Mexican Lutheran Conference of Missouri." The first Lutheran missionaries focused their efforts in Mexico City, Monterrey, Nuevo León, and Torreón, Coahuila. The LCMS opened a small seminary—the Instituto Concordia de Mexico—in 1947 in Monterrey.

The year 1947 also marked the beginning of the American Lutheran Church (ALC)'s mission work in Mexico, which culminated in the foundation of the Mexican Lutheran Church ten years later. That same year, the ALC opened Casa Augsburgo, a small seminary in Mexico City. By 1962, the Mexican Lutheran Church consisted of 15 congregations. Two years later, Casa Augsburgo and the Instituto Concordia de Mexico merged to form Augsburg Lutheran Seminary, which was placed under the control of the Mexican Lutheran Church. Around that same time, theological differences between the members of the Mexican Lutheran Church led to a division within the church, ultimately leading to the formation of the Lutheran Synod of Mexico (theologically aligned with the LCMS) and the Confessional Evangelical Lutheran Church—Mexico (theologically aligned with the Wisconsin Evangelical Lutheran Synod).

By 1989, there were nearly 10,000 Lutherans in Mexico.

== Mexican Lutheran Church ==
The Mexican Lutheran Church (Spanish: Iglesia Luterana Mexicana or ILM) has been a member of the Lutheran World Federation since 1957 and is also a member of the Latin American Council of Churches. In 2009, the ILM ordained its first female pastors. As of 2019, it had 1,500 members, 11 congregations, and nine pastors. Its current president, elected in January 2018, is the Rev. Roberto Trejo Haager. In 1998, the ILM jointly reopened the Augsburg Lutheran Seminary with the International Lutheran Council-affiliated Lutheran Synod of Mexico.

=== Augsburg Lutheran Seminary ===
Originally founded in 1964, the Augsburg Lutheran Seminary (Spanish: El Seminario Luterano Augsburgo) is an institution of theological higher education operated by the Mexican Lutheran Church. Between 1964 and 1981, the seminary produced 33 graduates, who went on to serve congregations throughout Mexico, Central America, and portions of South America. Between 1981 and 1997, the seminary ceased to function, but it reopened in 1998 with two professors and four students. In 2011, the seminary began offering online courses.

== Lutheran Synod of Mexico ==
The Lutheran Synod of Mexico (Spanish: Sinodo Luterano de Mexico or SLM) originates from the 1940s mission work of the Lutheran Church—Missouri Synod and the International Lutheran Laymen's League, the latter of which began broadcasting a Spanish version of The Lutheran Hour in 1941. In 1969, the SLM became an independent sister church body of the LCMS, later joining the International Lutheran Council. In 1998, the SLM jointly reopened the Augsburg Lutheran Seminary with the Mexican Lutheran Church, but doctrinal concerns soon led it to abandon this partnership. Since 2015, the SLM has partnered with the LCMS to provide seminary education through Seminario Concordia in Buenos Aires, Argentina, and Concordia Theological Seminary in Fort Wayne, Indiana. As of 2019, it had 1,211 baptized members, 20 congregations and preaching stations, and 12 pastors. Its president is the Rev. Isaac Guadalupe Garcia Castillo.

== Confessional Evangelical Lutheran Church—Mexico ==
The Confessional Evangelical Lutheran Church—Mexico (Spanish: Iglesia Evangélica Luterana Confesional or IELC) was founded in 1968, when doctrinal controversies in the Mexican Lutheran Church and its Augsburg Lutheran Seminary led two pastors to seek fellowship with the Wisconsin Evangelical Lutheran Synod. It is a member of the Confessional Evangelical Lutheran Conference. In 2005, the Confessional Evangelical Lutheran Church—Mexico opened its own seminary. As of 2019, it had 650 members, 6 pastors, 5 seminary students, 10 congregations, and 13 preaching stations. Its president is Román Aguilar.

== Evangelical Lutheran Church of Mexico ==
The Evangelical Lutheran Church of Mexico (Spanish: Iglesia Evangélica Luterana de México) was historically the largest Lutheran church body in Mexico, with around 3,000 members. The Evangelical Lutheran Church of Mexico originated from the 1942–3 missionary efforts of the Latin American Lutheran Mission (LALM), an organization that itself grew out of the Minneapolis-based "South America Prayer League" in the 1930s. It continues to be supported by the LALM.

== Lutheran Apostolic Alliance of Mexico ==
The World Mission Prayer League started mission work in Mexico in 1945, organizing congregations in La Paz, Sinaloa, and Mazatlán. A number of these congregations joined the Mexican Lutheran Church, though they were replaced by new mission plants in Puebla and Sonora. In 1977, the remaining congregations were officially organized as the Lutheran Apostolic Alliance of Mexico (Spanish: Alianza Apostólica Luterana Mexicana or AALM). In 1988, the church body claimed 250 members in 11 congregations. As of 2018, the church body consisted of 13 congregations.

== Other churches ==
In addition to the three church bodies listed above, there are also several independent Lutheran congregations in Mexico. The German-speaking Evangelical Congregation in Mexico City (German: Evangelische Gemeinde in Mexiko Stadt) was founded in 1904 and has been continuously served by German pastors since 1927. It is affiliated with the Evangelical Church in Germany. In 1963, the congregation organized the German-Mexican Center of Assistance (Spanish: Centro de Asistencia Social, A.C.), a medical and social welfare center in Mexico City. The English-, Spanish-, and Portuguese-speaking Good Shepherd Lutheran Church (Spanish: Iglesia Luterana Buen Pastor) is the result of a 1964 merger between the LCMS-affiliated Lutheran Church of the Good Shepherd (organized in 1948) and the ALC-affiliated Ascension Lutheran Church (organized in 1959). A Scandinavian congregation formerly operated in Mexico City.

== See also ==
- Protestantism in Mexico
- Religion in Mexico
