= Japan Lutheran Church =

Japanese confessional Lutheran denomination

- 日本ルーテル教団 Nihon Ruteru Kyoudan
- Logo of the JLC
- Classification: Protestant
- Orientation: Lutheran
- Polity: Congregationalist
- Leader: Rev. Shin SHIMIZU
- Associations: Lutheran World Federation
- Region: Japan
- Origin: September 19, 1948; Tokyo, Japan
- Branched from: Lutheran Church–Missouri Synod
- Congregations: 35
- Members: 766 baptized

The Japan Lutheran Church (日本ルーテル教団, Nihon Ruteru Kyoudan) or NRK (based on its Romaji initials) is a Lutheran denomination in Japan. It currently has approximately 766 baptized members in 35 congregations nationwide.

The current chairman of the NRK is Rev. Shinri Emoto.

== History ==
During the occupation of Japan by the Allied forces after the Second World War, several US Army chaplains affiliated with the Lutheran Church – Missouri Synod (LCMS) were serving the local population. Discussions were held with representatives from the Japan Evangelical Lutheran Church (JELC) as well as other churches on mission work in post-war Japan. With the information gathered, the LCMS came to the conclusion that they should send missionaries to northern Japan where the Lutheran presence was scarce in order to avoid redundancies among the various Lutheran churches and missions operating in Japan and a resolution was adopted accordingly.

In September 1948, the LCMS installed the first missionary to Japan and declared the start of the Japan Mission, in accordance with the resolution adopted. With the passing of the Broadcast Law (放送法, Hōsō Hō) in 1950 legalising commercial and private broadcasting, The Lutheran Hour radio program started broadcasting in 1951.

The NRK was officially recognised as a religious body in Japan in 1953. Cooperation with the JELC remained close and in the same year, the NRK-established School of Theology was merged with JELC's Lutheran Theological Seminary. In 1966, both the NRK and the JELC came into full communion with the adoption of the Establishment of Pulpit and Altar Fellowship and the Agreement on Cooperation in Theological Education agreements. This opened the door for the NRK's participation in activities organised by the Lutheran World Federation (LWF). In 1968, the self-governing NRK was established and it became self-supporting in 1976.

In 1997, the NRK sent a delegation to the LWF's Assembly in Hong Kong and became an associate member of the LWF in 1999. Prior to that, the NRK had already been a full member of the confessional International Lutheran Council that was constituted in 1993.

In 2021, the NRK amended its constitution to allow women to be ordained as pastors. As a result of that and other differences in doctrinal issues, the LCMS, at its 2023 convention, declared that it was no longer in fellowship with the NRK.

== Structure and organization ==
The NRK is structured with a congregational polity.

=== Congregations by geographical regions ===
- Hokkaidō

- Hokkaidō

Congregations in the cities of Asahikawa, Ebetsu, Fukagawa, Kitami, Otaru, Sapporo, and Suttsu

- Tōhoku

- Fukushima

Congregations in the cities of Fukushima

- Kantō

- Gunma

A congregation in the city of Tatebayashi

- Saitama

Congregations in the cities of Hannō and Saitama

- Chiba

A congregation in the city of Funabashi

- Tokyo

Congregations in the wards of Adachi, Chiyoda, Minato, Ōta and Suginami as well as the city of Hino

- Kanagawa

Congregations in Fujisawa, Kawasaki, and Yokohama

- Chūbu

- Niigata

Congregations in the cities of Nagaoka, Niigata, Sanjō, and Shibata

- Kyūshū

- Okinawa

A congregation in the village of Nakagusuku

== Ministries ==
Education is emphasized as a means of communicating the Gospel. Accordingly, the NRK operates Urawa Lutheran School in Urawa and Holy Hope School in Hannō. The NRK also operates the Japan Lutheran College in cooperation with the JELC and several members of the NRK sit on the college's board of regents. The NRK also operates eleven kindergartens, four preschools, an elementary school, two middle schools, two secondary schools, and a Japanese and English Language Institute (both as the Lutheran Language Institute).

The Volunteer Youth Ministry (VYM) program for lay missionaries through LCMS World Mission who committed themselves for 2½ years in ministry serving as English language teachers. Most of the volunteers were young college graduates.

== Affiliations and cooperation ==
=== Ecumenism ===
The NRK is not associated with ecumenical organizations such as the National Christian Council in Japan, the Christian Conference of Asia or the World Council of Churches. However, the NRK was a full member of the International Lutheran Council until 2025 and is an associate member of the Lutheran World Federation.

=== Relationship with other Lutheran churches ===
The work of Lutheran missionaries resulted in the establishment of five major Lutheran church bodies and a number of smaller ones, with a total membership of approximately 30,000. The largest of these, with about 20,000 members, is the JELC. Other Lutheran churches include the Kinki Evangelical Lutheran Church, the West Japan Evangelical Lutheran Church, the Japan Lutheran Brethren Church, the Japan Evangelical Lutheran Church and the Fellowship Deaconry Evangelical Church (Marburger Mission).

Cooperation among the various Lutheran churches in Japan is common, particularly with respect to outreach ministries. Church planting plans are mutually shared in order to avoid duplications. Most of the Lutheran churches have also joined together to form the Lutheran Literature Society (聖文舎, Seibunsha), which publishes Christian books and materials; one notable endeavor being in the publication of a common Lutheran hymnal.

The NRK and the JELC sponsor a joint seminary in Tokyo, the Japan Lutheran Theological Seminary while the other Lutheran seminary in Kobe is sponsored by the Kinki Evangelical Lutheran Church and the West Japan Evangelical Lutheran Church.

== See also ==
- Christianity in Japan
- Protestantism in Japan
