= Lutheran Church in Chile =

Denomination of Lutheranism in Chile

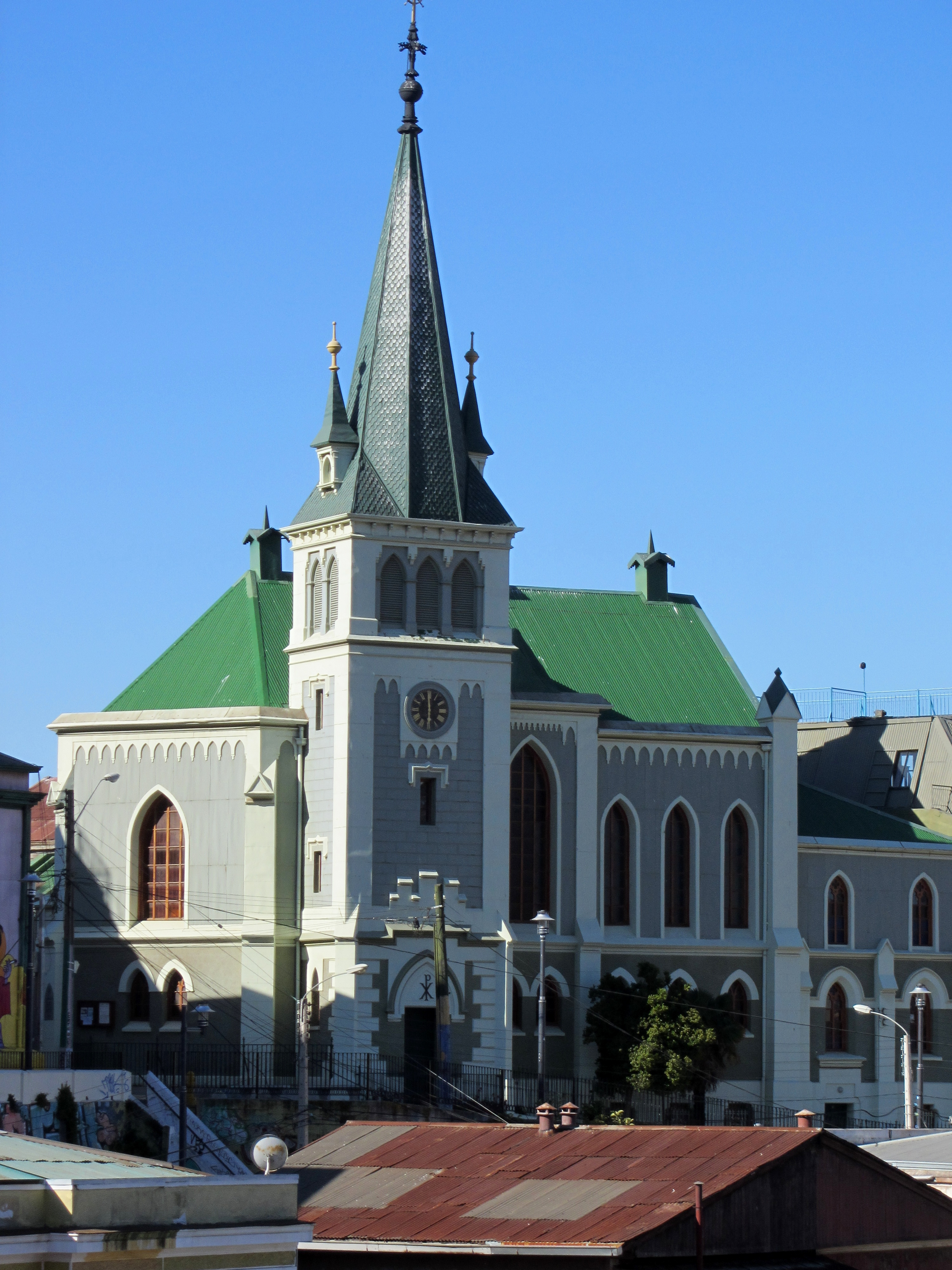
Lutheran Church of the Holy Cross, Valparaíso

The Lutheran Church in Chile (Iglesia Luterana en Chile, ILCH) is one of the two denominations of Lutheranism in Chile. It separated from the historical Evangelical Lutheran Church in Chile (IELCH) in 1975 due to differences in political perceptions of the pastors and bishops during the beginning of the military dictatorship led by Augusto Pinochet. It is a member of the Lutheran World Federation, which it joined in 1991. Most congregations are bilingual in German and Spanish.

== Organisation and structure ==
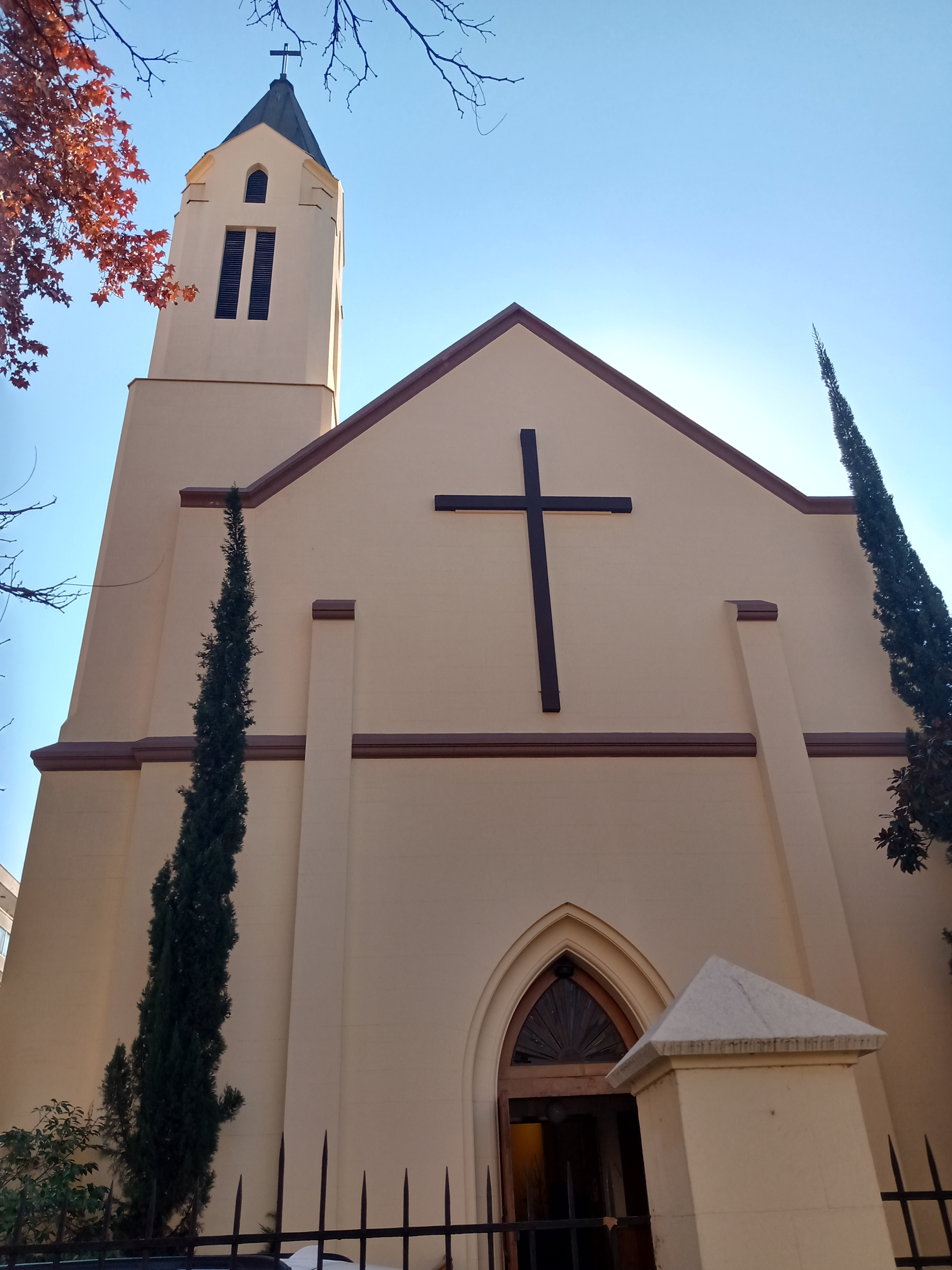
Lutheran Church of the Redeemer, Santiago de Chile

The ILCH is divided into districts and communities (or congregations). Each community is managed by its own independent board of directors. All the communities meet in a national synod. For ecumenical affairs within Chilean Protestantism, the church is a member of the Council of Historical Protestant Churches of Chile. The national directory is headed by the President and the National Bishop. Today the Church has 23 active communities throughout the country:

- Valparaíso (The Holy Cross) and Viña del Mar (The Holy Trinity)
- Santiago de Chile (The Reedemer of Providencia and St. Paul of Vitacura)
- Los Ángeles
- Temuco
- Villarrica
- Paillaco
- Valdivia
- Osorno
- La Unión
- Lake Community (Frutillar, Llanquihue, Nueva Braunau, Purranque, Puerto Octay, and Puerto Fonck)
- Southern Community (Puerto Montt, Puerto Varas, Los Muermos, La Laja, La Fábrica, and Ancud)
