= Taiwan Lutheran Church =

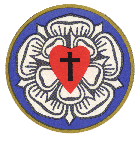
- Logo of the TLC
- Classification: Protestant
- Orientation: Lutheran
- Polity: Interdependent local, regional, and national expressions with modified episcopal polity
- Leader: Rev Chen Chih-Hung
- Associations: LWF, ALC
- Region: Taiwan
- Origin: 1954
- Branched from: Lutheran Church of China
- Congregations: 40
- Members: 11,422 baptized

The Taiwan Lutheran Church (TLC; Chinese: 台灣信義會; pinyin: Táiwān Xìnyì Huì) is one of the six Lutheran bodies in Taiwan. It currently has 80 mission sites nationwide (including 40 local congregations, 30 church plants and 10 parachurch organizations) with a total of 11,422 baptized members.

The current bishop of the Taiwan Lutheran Church is the Rt Rev Chen Chih-Hung, first elected in 2008.

== History ==
Like the Southern Baptist Convention, the Lutheran Church also established itself in Taiwan during the 1950s. Both American and Scandinavian Lutherans had been active in China since the final decade of the 19th century.

The Norwegian Lutheran Mission Association of the Norwegian Lutheran Church in America had sent its first representatives to China in 1890. The missionaries established themselves in Hubei and, later, Henan provinces. Some five years later, in 1896, the Danish Lutherans began their own mission station in Manchuria.

The years following the Boxer Rebellion saw a dramatic expansion of Lutheran efforts. The Norwegian American Lutherans sent ten additional missionaries to China. Belgian Lutherans from The Hague worked closely with their American co-religionists and considerable progress was made during the years from 1902 to 1914. Other Lutheran societies from the United States and from the Scandinavian nations sent their personnel to various parts of China. Most of these bodies - the American Lutheran Brethren Mission is one example - settled in with the earlier arrivals in Hubei and Henan. Other missionaries, such as those serving the newly revived Norwegian Missionary Society, moved into cities in Hunan.

By 1914, the Lutherans had been able to establish new mission stations and plant new churches. They had also been gaining new converts. Their total membership reached 24,422 in 1914. Finally, because they stressed self-government, they had been able to set up a seminary in Shekou, in Hubei, where they could train Chinese Lutheran clergy and church workers.

The coming of World War One hurt German Lutheran efforts, but missionaries from other nations helped out their brethren. The war did have its positive side for the Lutherans in China: It was during these years that preliminary steps were taken to unite their various groups, representing six different nations, into a Lutheran mission union. A preliminary constitution for this union was drawn up and this proposal was accepted by the different Lutheran bodies in 1917.

The 1920s and 1930s saw the steady evolution of a Lutheran presence in the face of the anti-missionary campaign and the anti-imperialist movement. Only the Communist victory brought to an end the almost sixty years of Lutheran development.

The Taiwan Lutheran Church was the fruit of the work of several mission societies which had worked before in mainland China and the Lutheran Church of China. Work began in Kaohsiung and Taipei, then gradually expanded to Taichung, Miaoli, Chiayi and Tainan.

=== The beginnings ===
In April 1950, Chin Chung-An, a medical doctor from Xi'an, started conducting family worship services in his residence in Kaoshiung. By 3 June 1951, the Kaohsiung congregation was established and 59 people were baptised. This congregation became the first congregation of the Taiwan Lutheran Church and is today known as the Chien-Chen Lutheran Church.

At around the same time, two Norwegian women missionaries, Helga Waabeno and Gertrude Fitje, who had worked at the Mackay Memorial Hospital as nurses, started a Bible study class at their residence in Taipei. The class was taken over a year later by an American missionary with Norwegian ancestors, Lenorah Erickson, and by 1952 had been organized as the first TLC congregation in Taipei.

=== Establishment of a national church ===
On 1 November 1954, the TLC was officially established in a meeting held at the Taipei Salvation Lutheran Church. This meeting brought together 32 delegates from congregations and outreach centres set up by mission societies which had previously been active in mainland China and had set up seven of the 16 synods of the Lutheran Church of China (LCC). The seven former LCC synods who took part in the church union under the banner of the TLC were:

- Yuzhong Synod (豫中區會)

Formerly the Augustana Synod Mission in central Henan

- Yu'e Synod (豫鄂區會)

Formerly the United Lutheran Mission in Henan and Hubei

- Yudong Synod (豫東區會)

Formerly the Lutheran Free Church Mission in eastern Henan

- Yuxi Synod (豫西區會)

Formerly the American Lutheran Brethren Mission in western Henan

- Yu’eshaan Synod (豫鄂陕區會)

Formerly the Norwegian Lutheran China Mission in Hubei, Henan and Shaanxi

- Xiangzhong Synod (湘中區會)

Formerly the Norwegian Mission in central Hunan

- Dongbei Synod (東北區會)

Formerly the Danish Mission in Manchuria and Northeast China

Missionaries formerly attached to the Shaannan Synod (陕南區會) in Southern Shaanxi and the Xiangxi Synod (湘西區會) in western Hunan also attached their work in Taiwan under the umbrella of the TLC in 1954 and 1956 respectively.

=== Secession of churches within the TLC ===
In 1956, five congregations associated with the former Yuxi and Yu’eshaan synods withdrew from the TLC to form the Chinese Lutheran Brethren Church (1958) and the Lutheran Church of the Republic of China (1960) respectively.

This was followed by the congregations associated with the former Shaannan synod which withdrew in 1961 and formed the China Lutheran Gospel Church in 1973. Congregations associated with the former Xiangxi synod withdrew in 1974 and formed the Lutheran Church of Taiwan in 1977.

== Beliefs and practices ==
The TLC is a member church of the Lutheran World Federation, a communion of Lutheran Churches throughout the world. As a church in the Lutheran tradition, it accepts the teachings found in the unaltered Augsburg Confession, Luther's Small Catechism and other confessional articles and symbols of the Book of Concord.

The TLC accepts the ordination of women as co-workers and pastors in the denomination with the first woman ordained on January 31, 1999.

== Structure and organization ==
=== List of parishes ===
The Taiwan Lutheran Church is divided into four parishes:

- Taipei Parish

Congregations in

Special Municipalities: New Taipei City, Taipei City and Taoyuan City
Provincial Cities: Hsinchu City and Keelung City
Counties: Hualien County, Hsinchu County and Yilan County

- Taichung Parish

Congregations in

Special Municipality: Taichung City
Counties: Changhua County, Miaoli County, Nantou County and Yunlin County

- Chya-Nan Parish

Congregations in

Special Municipality: Tainan City
Provincial City: Chiayi City
County: Chiayi County

- Kaohsiung Parish

Congregations in

Special Municipality: Kaohsiung City
Counties: Pingtung County and Taitung County

=== Presidents and Bishops of the TLC ===
The first president of the TLC was elected from the representative of the Yuxi synod.

- 1954–1955

Rev Tu Chang-Wu

- 1956–1959

Rev Stanley Tung

- 1959–1962

Rev Peter Chou

- 1962–1966

Rev Chang Chi-Tang

- 1974–1976

Rev Peter Chou

- 1976–1978

Rev Chang Chi Tang

- 1978–1980

Rev Liu Sing-Yi

- 1980–1984

Rev Lee Chang-Ying

- 1984–1986

Rev Peter Chou

- 1986–1990

Rev Stanley Tung

- 1990–1993

Rev Thomas Yu

- 1993–1999

Rev Chuang Tung-Chieh

- 1999–2005

Rev Peter Yang

- 2005–2008

Rev Chen Chun-Kuang

- 2008–2014

Rev Chen Chih-Hung

- 2014–2020

Rev Wu Ying-Ping

- 2020–2023

Rev Chang Fu-Ming

- 2023– present

Rev Kao Tang-En

== Schools and colleges ==
=== Lutheran Theological Seminary ===
The Lutheran Theological Seminary was established in Taipei in 1957. The campus was moved to Taichung in 1960. The seminary was forced to close in 1965 due to disagreements between the Chinese and Western faculty.

In 1977, the TLC jointly founded the Lutheran Theological Seminary in Hong Kong together with the Evangelical Lutheran Church of Hong Kong, the Chinese Rhenish Church Hong Kong Synod, and the Tsung Tsin Mission of Hong Kong.

=== China Lutheran Seminary ===
The China Lutheran Seminary was established in Hsinchu in 1966 by the Lutheran Church of the Republic of China. On 31 October 1989, the TLC inked an agreement with the other Lutheran churches in Taiwan to fully support the Chinese Lutheran Seminary.

== See also ==
- Lutheran Church of China
- Christianity in Taiwan
