= Evangelical Lutheran Church in Venezuela =

Protestant denomination in Venezuela

- Iglesia Evangélica Luterana en Venezuela
- Classification: Protestant
- Orientation: Lutheran
- President: Gerardo Hands
- Associations: Lutheran World Federation; Latin American Council of Churches
- Region: Venezuela
- Headquarters: Apartado Postal 3012, El Trigal, Valencia, Carabobo, Venezuela
- Members: approx. 1,250

The Evangelical Lutheran Church in Venezuela (Spanish: Iglesia Evangélica Luterana en Venezuela) is a Lutheran denomination in Venezuela. It is a member of the Lutheran World Federation, which it joined in 1986. It is also a member of the Latin American Council of Churches.

As of January 2026 the President of the church is Pastor Gerardo Hands.
