= Lutheran World Federation =

Global communion of national and regional Lutheran denominations

- Type: Communion
- Classification: Protestant
- Orientation: Lutheran
- Scripture: Protestant Bible
- Theology: Lutheran theology
- President: Henrik Stubkjær
- General Secretary (CEO): Anne Burghardt
- Headquarters: [Chemin du Pavillon 2,1218] Le Grand-Saconnex (Geneva, Switzerland)
- Origin: 1947
- Members: 78,431,111 (2023)
- Official website: www.lutheranworld.org

The Lutheran World Federation (LWF; German: Lutherischer Weltbund) is a global communion of national and regional Lutheran denominations headquartered in the Ecumenical Centre in Geneva, Switzerland. The federation was founded in the Swedish city of Lund in the aftermath of the Second World War in 1947 to coordinate the activities of the many differing Lutheran churches. Since 1984, the member churches are in pulpit and altar fellowship, with common doctrine as the basis of membership and mission activity.

The LWF has 154 member church bodies in 99 countries representing over 78 million Lutherans; as of 2023, it was the sixth-largest Christian communion (see list of denominations by membership). According to the World Christian Database and World Christian Encyclopedia, published by Edinburgh University Press, excluding the United and Uniting Churches, the LWF reportedly had 82,310,000 members in 2020. The LWF acts on behalf of its member churches in areas of common interest such as ecumenical and interfaith relations, theology, humanitarian assistance, human rights, communication, and the various aspects of mission and development work.

The Department for World Service is the LWF's humanitarian and development arm. It has programmes in 24 countries and is the UNHCR ninth largest implementing partner. The LWF is a member of ACT Alliance.

On 31 October 1999, in Augsburg, Germany, the LWF signed the Joint Declaration on the Doctrine of Justification with the Roman Catholic Church. The Catholic–Lutheran dialogue is a series of discussions that began during July 1964 as an outgrowth of the Second Vatican Council. The statement is an attempt to narrow the theological divide between the two faiths. The declaration also states that the mutual condemnations between 16th-century Catholic church and Lutheranism no longer apply. A similar event took place in Lund Cathedral on 31 October 2016, the 499th anniversary of the beginning of the Protestant Reformation, with the signing of the Statement on the 500th anniversary of the Protestant Reformation.

As of 2016, 119 of the LWF's (then) 145 member churches (80%) ordained women as ministers.

== History ==
The LWF was founded at Lund, Sweden, in 1947. It replaced the more informal Lutheran World Convention, which had been founded in 1923 and assembled for conventions in 1923, 1929, and 1935. The headquarters (Communion Office) are based in Geneva, Switzerland. The goal was to coordinate international activities of the many Lutheran churches, to provide a forum for discussions on theological and organizational issues, and to assist in philanthropy, missionary activity, and exchange of students and professors. A key leader was Executive Secretary Sylvester C. Michelfelder (1889–1951), representing the American Lutheran Church. He had been a leader in organizing $45 million in American help for the rebuilding of Protestant churches in Germany after 1945. By the time of his death in 1951, the federation represented 52 churches in 25 countries.

== Largest churches ==
The 20 largest member churches are ( 2023 statistics):

Member Church	Reported Members
Ethiopian Evangelical Church Mekane Yesus	12,000,000
Evangelical Lutheran Church in Tanzania	8,500,000
Batak Christian Protestant Church	6,333,000
Church of Sweden	5,484,000
Church of Denmark	4,253,575
Malagasy Lutheran Church	5.356.456
Church of Norway	3,611,670
Evangelical Lutheran Church of Finland	3,579,616
Andhra Evangelical Lutheran Church	3,000,000
Evangelical Lutheran Church in America	2,904,686
Evangelical Lutheran Church in Hanover	2,302,547
The Lutheran Church of Christ in Nigeria	2,200,000
Evangelical Lutheran Church in Bavaria	2,143,233
Evangelical Lutheran Church in Württemberg	1,821,266
Evangelical Lutheran Church in Northern Germany	1,772,953
Evangelical Lutheran Church of Papua New Guinea	1,500,000
Protestant Church in the Netherlands	1,425,000
Evangelical Lutheran Church in Namibia	853,522
Evangelical Lutheran Church in Cameroon	700,000

== Federation officials and leadership ==
The Lutheran World Federation has a dual leadership structure. The President serves as the moderator of the Council and the Assembly and as ecclesial leader of the Federation, while the General Secretary is the chief executive officer responsible for its administration and operations. According to the LWF Constitution, both serve as chief spokespersons of the Lutheran World Federation.

=== President ===
The president presides at meetings of the Assembly, Council, and Executive Committee, and oversees the life and work of the federation in consultation with the General Secretary.

No.	Portrait	Name	Term	Church	Nationality
1		Anders Nygren (1890–1978)	1947–1952	Church of Sweden	Sweden
2		Hanns Lilje (1899–1977)	1952–1957	Evangelical-Lutheran Church of Hanover	Germany
3		Franklin Clark Fry (1900–1968)	1957–1963	United Lutheran Church in America (until 1962); Lutheran Church in America (after 1962)	United States
4		Fredrik A. Schiotz (1901–1989)	1963–1970	American Lutheran Church	United States
5		Mikko Juva (1918–2004)	1970–1977	Evangelical Lutheran Church of Finland	Finland
6		Josiah Kibira (1925–1988)	1977–1984	Evangelical Lutheran Church in Tanzania	Tanzania
7		Zoltán Káldy (1919–1987)	1984–1987	Evangelical-Lutheran Church in Hungary	Hungary
8		Johannes Hanselmann (1927–1999)	1987–1990	Evangelical Lutheran Church in Bavaria	Germany
9		Gottfried Brakemeier (born 1937)	1990–1997	Evangelical Church of the Lutheran Confession in Brazil	Brazil
10		Christian Krause (1940-2024)	1997–2003	Evangelical Lutheran Church in Brunswick	Germany
11		Mark Hanson (born 1946)	2003–2010	Evangelical Lutheran Church in America	United States
12		Munib Younan (born 1950)	2010–2017	Evangelical Lutheran Church in Jordan and the Holy Land	Palestine
13		Musa Filibus (born 1960)	2017–2023	The Lutheran Church of Christ in Nigeria	Nigeria
14		Henrik Stubkjær (born 1961)	2023–present	Evangelical Lutheran Church of Denmark	Denmark

=== General Secretary ===
The Lutheran World Federation Council elects the General Secretary for a seven-year term. The person appointed is eligible for one re-election. The General Secretary conducts the business of the federation assisted by the Communion Office Leadership Team, comprising department and unit heads appointed by the council, and carries out the decisions of the Assembly and Council. Together with the President, the General Secretary serves as the chief spokesperson of the Lutheran World Federation. On 19 June 2021, the LWF Council elected Estonian theologian Anne Burghardt as the next General Secretary. She is the first woman and the first person from Central Eastern Europe to serve in this role and assumed office on 1 November of that year.

No.	Name	Term	Nationality
1	Sylvester Michelfelder (1889–1951)	1947–1951	United States
2	Carl Lund-Quist (1908–1965)	1951–1960	United States
3	Kurt Schmidt-Clausen (1920–1993)	1960–1965	Germany
4	André Appel (1921–2007)	1965–1974	France
5	Carl Henning Mau Jr. (1922–1995)	1974–1985	United States
6	Gunnar Stålsett (born 1935)	1985–1994	Norway
7	Ishmael Noko (born 1943)	1994–2010	Zimbabwe
8	Martin Junge (born 1961)	2010–2021	Chile
9	Anne Burghardt (born 1975)	2021-	Estonia

== Membership ==
The Lutheran World Federation is the largest global communion of Lutherans though some of its members are United and Uniting Churches, most of which are also members of the World Communion of Reformed Churches. There are also many Confessional Lutheran churches, such as the Lutheran Church – Missouri Synod, which are not in fellowship with the LWF. Some LWF member churches are also members of the International Lutheran Council or the Global Confessional and Missional Lutheran Forum, though the Confessional Evangelical Lutheran Conference does not allow its members to be in fellowship with either communion. This map shows the global distribution of Lutheranism based on The LWF 2019 membership data. (Note: This map undercounts the number of Lutherans in several countries, notably the United States. The LWF does not include the Lutheran Church–Missouri Synod and several other Lutheran bodies which together have over 2.5 million members.)

=== Statistics ===
Lutheranism by country in 2019, Lutheran World Federation member churches

Year	Number of denominations	Number of individual members	% of global population
2009	140	70,053,316	1.01%
2013	142	72,268,329	0.99%
2015	145	74,261,862	0.99%
2019	148	77,493,989	0.99%
2023	150	78,431,111	0.97%

Between 2009 and 2023, the Lutheran World Federation (LWF) grew from 140 to 150 member denominations. In the same period, individual membership grew from 70,053,316 to 78,431,111 people. This represents a growth of 11.95% in 14 years. In the same period, the global population grew by 18.22%.

LWF statistics from 2009 to 2023 show growth in membership in Africa and Asia. At the same time, membership is declining in Europe and America. The Lutheran World Federation reports the membership of each member church as illustrated in the following chart:

Member Church	Number of Members	Year
Evangelical Lutheran Church of Angola	92,051	2023
Evangelical Lutheran Church in Botswana	26,023	
Evangelical Lutheran Church in Cameroon	700,000	
Church of The Lutheran Brethren of Cameroon	225,378	
Evangelical Lutheran Church of the Central African Republic	120,000	
Evangelical Lutheran Church in Congo	98,123	
Evangelical Lutheran Church of Eritrea	11,000	
Ethiopian Evangelical Church Mekane Yesus	12,000,000	
Evangelical Lutheran Church in Kenya	100,000	
Kenya Evangelical Lutheran Church	15,000	
Lutheran Church in Liberia	118,000	
Malagasy Lutheran Church	4,000,000	
Evangelical Lutheran Church in Malawi	150,000	
Evangelical Lutheran Church in Mozambique	18,163	
Evangelical Lutheran Church in Namibia	853,522	
German-speaking Evangelical Lutheran Church in Namibia	4,200	
Evangelical Lutheran Church in the Republic of Namibia	420,000	
Lutheran Church of Nigeria	65,000	
Lutheran Church of Christ in Nigeria	2,200,000	
Evangelical Lutheran Church of Congo	3,908	
Lutheran Church of Rwanda	7,200	
The Lutheran Church of Senegal	8,000	
Evangelical Lutheran Church in Sierra Leone	6,565	
Evangelical Lutheran Church in Southern Africa (Cape Church)	3,950	
Evangelical Lutheran Church in Southern Africa	580,000	
Moravian Church in South Africa	80,000	
Northeastern Evangelical Lutheran Church in Southern Africa	9,300	
Evangelical Lutheran Church in Tanzania	8,500,000	
Evangelical Lutheran Church in Zambia	5,284	
Evangelical Lutheran Church in Zimbabwe	309,881	
Lutheran Church of Australia	140,000	
Bangladesh Lutheran Church	6,270	
Bangladesh Northern Evangelical Lutheran Church	12,070	
Lutheran Church in Cambodia	1,080	
Evangelical Lutheran Church in Jordan and the Holy Land	2,500	
Evangelical Lutheran Church of Hong Kong	18,000	
Hong Kong and Macau Lutheran Church	2,399	
Chinese Rhenish Church Hong Kong Synod	13,500	
Tsung Tsin Mission of Hong Kong	12,800	
South Andhra Lutheran Church	95,000	
Good Shepherd Evangelical Lutheran Church	20,926	
Manipur Evangelical Lutheran Church	11,527	
Christ Lutheran Church	15,900	
Tamil Evangelical Lutheran Church	100,000	
Acrot Lutheran Church	44,689	
Gossner Evangelical Lutheran Church in Chotanagpur and Assam	242,803	
Evangelical Lutheran Church in Madhya Pradesh	23,000	
Northern Evangelical Lutheran Church	101,722	
India Evangelical Lutheran Church	150,000	
Bodo Evangelical Lutheran Church	12,479	
Evangelical Lutheran Church in the Himalayan States	40,064	
Jeypore Evangelical Lutheran Church	150,000	
Andhra Evangelical Lutheran Church	3,000,000	
The United Protestant Church	20,000	
Protestant Christian Church in Mentawi	39,892	
Communion of Protestant Christian Church	51,125	
Indonesian Christian Lutheran Church	23,000	
Batak Christian Community Church	37,718	
Christian Communion of Indonesia Church in Nias	26,250	
Christian Protestant Angkola Church	30,128	
Pakpak Dairi Christian Protestant Church	42,785	
Protestant Christian Batak Church	6,333,000	
Protestant Church of Niha Keriso in Indonesia	42,536	
Simalungun Protestant Christian Church	227,690	
Protestant Christian Church (BNKP)	464,012	
Indonesia Christian Church	200,893	
Christian Protestant Church in Indonesia	274,685	
Kinki Evangelical Lutheran Church	2,535	
Japan Evangelical Lutheran Church	21,558	
Japan Lutheran Church	694	
Basel Christian Church of Malaysia	65,000	
Evangelical Lutheran Church in Malaysia	4,250	
Lutheran Church in Malaysia	6,736	
Protestant Church in Sabah	34,731	
Lutheran Church of Myanmar	2,000	
Myanmar Lutheran Church	3,830	
Mara Evangelical Church	21,879	
Evangelical Lutheran Church in Myanmar (Lutheran Bethlehem Church)	3,395	
Nepal Evangelical Lutheran Church	1,385	
Evangelical Lutheran Church of Papua New Guinea	1,500,000	
Gutnius Lutheran Church - Papua New Guinea	149,869	
Lutheran Church in the Philippines	58,000	
Lutheran Church in Singapore	2,727	
Lutheran Church in Korea	2,228	
Lanka Lutheran Church	5,324	
Taiwan Lutheran Church	9,502	
Lutheran Church of Taiwan (Republic of China)	1,517	
Lutheran Church of the Republic of China	431	
Evangelical Lutheran Church in Thailand	4,000	
Federation of Evangelical Lutheran Churches in Russia and Other States	20,000	
Evangelical Church in the Republic of Croatia	3,300	
Evangelical Church of Czech Brethren	58,521	
Estonian Evangelical Lutheran Church	160,000	
Evangelical Lutheran Church in Georgia	1,700	
Evangelical Lutheran Church in Hungary	176,000	
Evangelical Lutheran Church of Latvia	250,000	
Latvian Evangelical Lutheran Church Worldwide	4,800	
Evangelical Lutheran Church of Lithuania	18,100	
Evangelical Church of the Augsburg Confession in Poland	60,244	
Evangelical Lutheran Church in Romania	23,700	
Evangelical Church of the Augsburg Confession in Romania	10,773	
Slovak Evangelical Church of the Augsburg Confession in Serbia	50,000	
Evangelical Church of the Augsburg Confession in the Slovak Republic	193,995	
Evangelical Church of the Augsburg Confession in Slovenia	8,327	
German Evangelical Lutheran Church of Ukraine	1,000	
Evangelical Church of the Augsburg Confession in Austria	247,834	
Malagasy Protestant Church in France	10,000	
Union of Protestant Churches of Alsace and Lorraine	220,000	
United Protestant Church of France	25,000	
Evangelical Lutheran Church of Saxony	610,503	
Evangelical Lutheran Church of Schaumburg-Lippe	45,764	
Church of Lippe (Lutheran Section)	22,400	
Evangelical Church in Central Germany	615,855	
Evangelical Lutheran Church in Baden	2,444	
Evangelical Lutheran Church in Northern Germany	1,772,953	
Evangelical Lutheran Church in Oldenburg	371,688	
Evangelical Lutheran Church in Bavaria	2,143,233	
Evangelical Lutheran Church in Württemberg	1,821,266	
Evangelical Lutheran Church of Hanover	2,302,547	
Evangelical Lutheran Church in Brunswick	293,979	
Evangelical Lutheran Church in Italy	6,000	
Evangelical Lutheran Churches in Switzerland and in Liechtenstein	3,150	
Protestant Church in the Netherlands	1,425,000	
Lutheran Church in Great Britain	1,500	
Evangelical Church of the River Plate	25,000	
United Evangelical Lutheran Church	6,000	
Bolivian Evangelical Lutheran Church	3,731	
Evangelical Church of the Lutheran Confession in Brazil	614,555	
Evangelical Lutheran Church in Chile	2,500	
Lutheran Church in Chile	9,900	
Evangelical Lutheran Church of Colombia	2,100	
Lutheran Costa Rican Church	500	
United Evangelical Church in Cuba Lutheran Synod	1,500	
Salvadoran Lutheran Church	15,500	
Augustinian Lutheran Church of Guatemala	2,892	
Guatemala Lutheran Church	950	
Evangelical Lutheran Church in Guyana	15,594	
Christian Lutheran Church of Honduras	2,005	
Mexican Lutheran Church	1,200	
Nicaraguan Lutheran Church of Faith and Hope	10,200	
Lutheran Church of Peru	853	
Evangelical Lutheran Church in Suriname	4,000	
Evangelical Lutheran Church in Venezuela	1,250	
Evangelical Lutheran Church of Denmark	4,253,575	
Evangelical Lutheran Church of Finland	3,579,616	
Evangelical Lutheran Church of Iceland	227,259	
Church of Norway	3,611,670	
Evangelical Lutheran Free Church of Norway	21,351	
Church of Sweden	5,484,000	
Evangelical Lutheran Church in Canada	40,171	
Evangelical Lutheran Church in America	2,904,686	
Total	78,431,111	

=== List ===
Sorted by country in alphabetical order

- Angola

Evangelical Lutheran Church of Angola

- Argentina

Evangelical Church of the River Plate (includes Paraguay and Uruguay) (also a member of the World Communion of Reformed Churches)
United Evangelical Lutheran Church

- Australia

Lutheran Church of Australia (includes New Zealand) – associate member church (also a former associate member of the International Lutheran Council)

- Austria

Protestant Church of the Augsburg Confession in Austria

- Bangladesh

Bangladesh Lutheran Church
Bangladesh Northern Evangelical Lutheran Church

- Belarus

Evangelical Lutheran Church in Russia and Other States (includes Georgia, Kazakhstan, Kyrgyzstan, Russia, and Uzbekistan)

- Belgium

Lutheran Church of Belgium: Arlon and Christian Mission

- Bolivia

Bolivian Evangelical Lutheran Church
German-Speaking Evangelical Lutheran Congregation in Bolivia

- Botswana

Evangelical Lutheran Church in Botswana

- Brazil

Evangelical Church of the Lutheran Confession in Brazil

- Cameroon

Church of the Lutheran Brethren of Cameroon
Evangelical Lutheran Church of Cameroon

- Canada

Evangelical Lutheran Church in Canada

- Central African Republic

Lutheran Church of the Central African Republic

- Chile

Evangelical Lutheran Church in Chile
Lutheran Church in Chile

- China (Hong Kong SAR)

The Chinese Rhenish Church Hong Kong Synod
The Evangelical Lutheran Church of Hong Kong
Hong Kong and Macau Lutheran Church
Tsung Tsin Mission of Hong Kong

- Colombia

Evangelical Lutheran Church of Colombia
St Matthew's Lutheran Congregation
St. Martin's Lutheran Congregation

- Congo, Democratic Republic of

Evangelical Lutheran Church in Congo

- Costa Rica

Evangelical Lutheran Church of Costa Rica
Lutheran Costarican Church

- Croatia

Evangelical Church in the Republic of Croatia

- Czechia

Evangelical Church of Czech Brethren (also a member of the World Communion of Reformed Churches)
Silesian Evangelical Church of the Augsburg Confession

- Denmark

Evangelical Lutheran Church in Denmark (includes Church of Greenland, but not the Church of the Faroe Islands)

- Ecuador

Evangelical Lutheran Church in Ecuador

- El Salvador

Salvadoran Lutheran Church

- Eritrea

Evangelical Church of Eritrea

- Estonia

Estonian Evangelical Lutheran Church

- Ethiopia

Ethiopian Evangelical Church Mekane Yesus (also a member of the Global Confessional and Missional Lutheran Forum)

- Finland

Evangelical Lutheran Church of Finland

- France

Protestant Church of the Augsburg Confession of Alsace and Lorraine
United Protestant Church of France (also a member of the World Communion of Reformed Churches)
Malagasy Protestant Church in France (also a member of the World Communion of Reformed Churches)

- Georgia

Evangelical Lutheran Church in Russia and Other States

- Germany

Church of Lippe, Lutheran Classis
Evangelical Church in Central Germany
Evangelical Lutheran Church in Baden
Evangelical Lutheran Church in Bavaria
Evangelical Lutheran Church in Brunswick
Evangelical Lutheran Church in Northern Germany
Evangelical Lutheran Church in Oldenburg
Evangelical-Lutheran Church in Württemberg
Evangelical Lutheran Church of Hanover
Evangelical Lutheran Church of Saxony
Evangelical Lutheran Church of Schaumburg-Lippe
Latvian Evangelical Lutheran Church Abroad

- Guatemala

Evangelical Lutheran Congregation "La Epifania"

- Guyana

Evangelical Lutheran Church in Guyana

- Hungary

The Evangelical Lutheran Church in Hungary

- Honduras

Christian Lutheran Church of Honduras

- Iceland

The Evangelical Lutheran Church of Iceland

- India

Andhra Evangelical Lutheran Church
Evangelical Lutheran Church in Madhya Pradesh
Evangelical Lutheran Church in the Himalayan States
Good Shepherd Evangelical Lutheran Church
Gossner Evangelical Lutheran Church in Chotanagpur and Assam
India Evangelical Lutheran Church (also a full member of the International Lutheran Council)
Jeypore Evangelical Lutheran Church
Northern Evangelical Lutheran Church
South Andhra Lutheran Church
The Arcot Lutheran Church
The Tamil Evangelical Lutheran Church

- Indonesia

Batak Christian Community Church
Christian Communion of Indonesia Church in Nias
Christian Protestant Church in Indonesia
Christian Protestant Angkola Church
Indonesian Christian Luther Church (also a member of the Global Confessional and Missional Lutheran Forum)
Pakpak Dairi Christian Protestant Church
Protestant Christian Batak Church
Protestant Christian Church
Protestant Christian Church in Mentawai
Simalungun Protestant Christian Church
Indonesian Christian Church
United Protestant Church

- Ireland

The Lutheran Church in Ireland

- Italy

Lutheran Evangelical Church in Italy

- Japan

Japan Evangelical Lutheran Church
Japan Lutheran Church – associate member church (also a full member of the International Lutheran Council)
Kinki Evangelical Lutheran Church

- Jordan

Evangelical Lutheran Church in Jordan & the Holy Land

- Kazakhstan

Evangelical Lutheran Church in Russia and Other States

- Kenya

Kenya Evangelical Lutheran Church

- Korea, Republic

Lutheran Church in Korea (also a full member of the International Lutheran Council)

- Kyrgyzstan

Evangelical Lutheran Church in Russia and Other States

- Latvia

Evangelical Lutheran Church of Latvia (also a full member of the International Lutheran Council)

- Liberia

Lutheran Church in Liberia

- Liechtenstein

Federation of Evangelical Lutheran Churches in Switzerland and the Principality of Liechtenstein

- Lithuania

Evangelical Lutheran Church of Lithuania

- Madagascar

Malagasy Lutheran Church (also a full member of the International Lutheran Council)

- Malawi

Evangelical Lutheran Church in Malawi

- Malaysia

Basel Christian Church of Malaysia
Evangelical Lutheran Church in Malaysia
Lutheran Church in Malaysia and Singapore
The Protestant Church in Sabah

- Mexico

German-Speaking Evangelical Congregation in Mexico
Mexican Lutheran Church

- Mozambique

Evangelical Lutheran Church in Mozambique

- Myanmar

Evangelical Lutheran Church in Myanmar
Lutheran Church of Myanmar
Myanmar Lutheran Church (also an associate member of the International Lutheran Council)
The Mara Evangelical Church

- Namibia

Evangelical Lutheran Church in Namibia (ELCIN)
Evangelical Lutheran Church in Namibia (ELCIN – GELC)
Evangelical Lutheran Church in the Republic of Namibia (ELCRN)

- Nepal

Nepal Northern Evangelical Lutheran Church

- Netherlands

Protestant Church in the Netherlands (also a member of the World Communion of Reformed Churches)

- Nicaragua

Nicaraguan Lutheran Church of Faith and Hope

- Nigeria

Lutheran Church in Nigeria
The Lutheran Church of Christ in Nigeria

- Norway

Church of Norway
Evangelical Lutheran Free Church of Norway

- Palestine

Evangelical Lutheran Church in Jordan & the Holy Land

- Peru

Evangelical Lutheran Church in Peru
Peruvian Lutheran Evangelical Church

- Papua New Guinea

Evangelical Lutheran Church of Papua New Guinea
Gutnius Lutheran Church (also a full member of the International Lutheran Council)

- Philippines

Lutheran Church in the Philippines (also a full member of the International Lutheran Council)

- Poland

Evangelical Church of Augsburg Confession in Poland

- Romania

Evangelical Church of the Augsburg Confession in Romania
Evangelical Lutheran Church in Romania

- Russia

Evangelical Lutheran Church in Russia and Other States
Evangelical Lutheran Church of Ingria in Russia (also a full member of the International Lutheran Council)

- Rwanda

Lutheran Church of Rwanda

- Senegal

Lutheran Church of Senegal

- Serbia

Slovak Evangelical Church of the Augsburg Confession in Serbia

- Sierra Leone

Evangelical Lutheran Church in Sierra Leone

- Singapore

Lutheran Church in Singapore

- Slovakia

Evangelical Church of the Augsburg Confession in Slovakia

- Slovenia

Evangelical Church of the Augsburg Confession in Slovenia

- South Africa

Evangelical Lutheran Church in Southern Africa
Evangelical Lutheran Church in Southern Africa (Cape Church)
Evangelical Lutheran Church in Southern Africa (N-T)
Moravian Church in South Africa

- Sri Lanka

Lanka Lutheran Church (also a full member of the International Lutheran Council)

- Suriname

Evangelical Lutheran Church in Suriname

- Sweden

Church of Sweden

- Switzerland

Federation of Evangelical Lutheran Churches in Switzerland and the Principality of Liechtenstein

- Taiwan (Republic of China)

Lutheran Church of Taiwan
Taiwan Lutheran Church

- Tanzania

Evangelical Lutheran Church in Tanzania (also a member of the Global Confessional and Missional Lutheran Forum)

- Thailand

Evangelical Lutheran Church in Thailand

- Ukraine

Evangelical Lutheran Church in Russia and Other States

- United Kingdom

Lutheran Church in Great Britain
The Lutheran Council of Great Britain

- United States of America

Evangelical Lutheran Church in America

- Uruguay

Evangelical Church of the River Plate
Evangelical Lutheran Church in Uruguay

- Uzbekistan

Evangelical Lutheran Church in Russia and Other States

- Venezuela

Evangelical Lutheran Church in Venezuela
Lutheran Church of Venezuela

- Zambia

Evangelical Lutheran Church in Zambia

- Zimbabwe

Evangelical Lutheran Church in Zimbabwe

== Churches in Full Communion ==
In 2026, the Lutheran World Federation and Anglican Communion reported on progress towards full communion between the two global communions, noting that many of their member churches are already in full communion with each other. The LWF notes that the Scandinavian Lutheran churches in the LWF are in full communion with the Anglican churches in Europe through the Porvoo Communion. In North America, the Episcopal Church and Anglican Church of Canada established full communion with the Evangelical Lutheran Church in America and Evangelical Lutheran Church in Canada through the Called to Common Mission agreement and Waterloo Declaration respectively. These ecumenical partnerships were elaborated upon further through Churches Beyond Borders, bringing each of the American and Canadian church bodies in communion with each other.

== Views on same-sex unions ==
Some member denominations have recognized same-sex unions through marriage, a blessing rite, or special prayers. These include the Church of Denmark, Church of Iceland, Church of Norway, Church of Sweden, Protestant Church A.B. in Austria, Evangelical Lutheran Church in America, Evangelical Lutheran Church in Canada, Evangelical Lutheran Church of Chile, Evangelical Lutheran Church of Finland, Evangelical Lutheran Church in Geneva, Evangelical Lutheran Church in Italy, a majority of the churches within the Protestant Church in Germany, Evangelical Church of the River Plate, Protestant Church in the Netherlands, and the United Protestant Church of France.

On the other side, several churches, including the Ethiopian Evangelical Church Mekane Yesus, Evangelical Lutheran Church in Tanzania, the Malagasy Lutheran Church, the Evangelical Lutheran Church of Latvia and the Evangelical Lutheran Church of Lithuania, which recognize marriage as solely the union between a man and a woman, have broken ties with many of the churches supporting same-sex unions.

The Evangelical Church of the Lutheran Confession in Brazil supports civil same-sex marriage, but does not allow its ministers to celebrate same-sex unions, neither does it ordain ministers who are living in same-sex unions.

== See also ==
- Confessional Evangelical Lutheran Conference
- Global Confessional and Missional Lutheran Forum
- International Lutheran Council
- List of the largest Protestant denominations
- Porvoo Communion
- World Council of Churches

== Bibliography ==
- Schjørring, Jens Holger; Kumari, Prasanna; Hjelm, Norman A., eds. (1997). From Federation to Communion: The History of the Lutheran World Federation. Minneapolis, Minnesota: Fortress Press. ISBN 978-0-8006-3110-9.

Wentz, Abdel Ross (1965). "The Lutheran World Federation". In Bodensieck, Julius (ed.). The Encyclopedia of the Lutheran Church. Vol. 2. Minneapolis, Minnesota: Augsburg Publishing House. pp. 1422–1432.
