= Evangelical Lutheran Church of Costa Rica =

Protestant denomination in Costa Rica

- German: Evangelisch-Lutherische Kirche in Costa Rica; Spanish: Iglesia Evangélica Luterana de Costa Rica
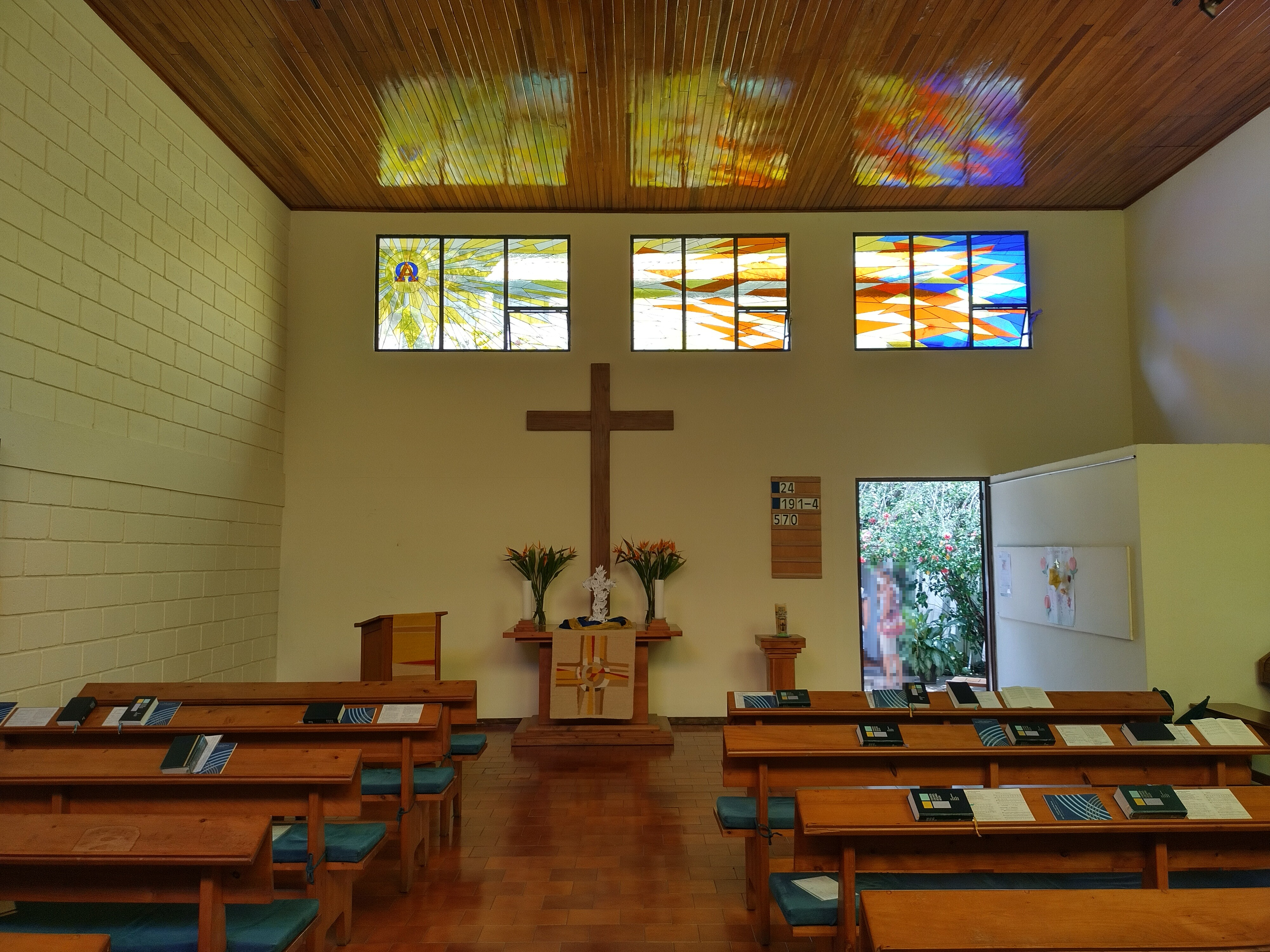
- Interior of the Martin Luther Church with altar
- Evangelical Lutheran Church of Costa Rica
- Country: Costa Rica
- Denomination: Lutheran
- Website: kirche.or.cr

History
- Founded: c. 1950s

The Evangelical Lutheran Church of Costa Rica (German: Evangelisch-Lutherische Kirche in Costa Rica; Spanish: Iglesia Evangélica Luterana de Costa Rica) is a German-speaking parish of Lutheran faith in Costa Rica. It was founded in the 1950s. It is a member of the Lutheran World Federation, which it joined in 1968, and is also affiliated with the Evangelical Church in Germany. Following the 2014 general election, its then-President, Bishop Melvin Jimenez, became Prime Minister of Costa Rica.
