= Evangelical Lutheran Church in Congo =

Protestant denomination in the Democratic Republic of Congo

The Evangelical Lutheran Church in Congo (French: Église évangélique luthérienne au Congo; ELCCo) is a Lutheran denomination in the Democratic Republic of Congo. It is a member of the Lutheran World Federation, which it joined in 1986. It is also a member of the All Africa Conference of Churches. It was known formerly as the Evangelical Lutheran Church of Zaïre.
