= Anne Burghardt =

Estonian theologian (born 1975)

The Reverend Anne Burghardt
- General Secretary of the Lutheran World Federation
- Church: Lutheran
- Appointed: 1 November 2021
- Predecessor: Martin Junge

Personal details
- Born: 19 November 1975 (age 50)
- Denomination: Lutheran
- Spouse: Matthias Burghardt
- Children: 2

Anne Burghardt (née Liiber; born 19 November 1975) is an Estonian theologian. Since November 2021, she has served as the General Secretary of the Lutheran World Federation and is the first woman to hold this position.

== Early life and education ==
Burghardt studied theology at the University of Tartu from 1994 to 1998. After graduating, she went to the University of Erlangen–Nuremberg (1998/1999) and to the Humboldt University of Berlin (1999/2000) to earn a master's degree. She then returned to the University of Tartu, where she received her master's degree in 2002. As of 2009, she holds a doctorate from the University of Erlangen-Nuremberg in the field of Orthodox liturgical studies with Karl Christian Felmy and Hacik Rafi Gazer.

== Career ==
Since 2013, Burghardt has been the head of the research department at the Theological Institute of the Estonian Evangelical Lutheran Church (EELK) and an adviser to that church on international and ecumenical relations. From 2013 to 2018, she was Secretary for Ecumenical Relations at the Office of the Lutheran World Federation (LWF) in Geneva.

On 19 June 2021, the Lutheran World Federation Council elected Burghardt as the new General Secretary. She prevailed in the elections with 28 votes in favor and 20 against Kenneth Mtata (Zimbabwe) and thus succeeded the general secretary Martin Junge. Burghardt is the first woman and the first representative from Central and Eastern Europe to hold this post. She took office on 1 November 2021.

== Personal life ==
Burghardt is married to Matthias Burghardt, a pastor of the EELK; the couple have two children.
