= Evangelical Presbyterian Church in Portugal =

The Evangelical Presbyterian Church in Portugal (Portuguese: Igreja Evangélica Presbiteriana em Portugal) is a result of evangelistic effort in Madeira between 1838 and 1846 by Robert Kalley, a Scottish minister, the mission continued in the continent in 1866. The first Presbyterian church was founded by Rev. Antonio de Matos, who arrived in Portugal in 1870. Matos was converted by Kalley, and studied in Scotland. Throughout the 19th and 20th century churches were planted in Madeira, Azores, Portugal. In 1926 a Presbytery was formed. In 1944 the Evangelical Presbyterian Church in Portugal was formed. In 1946 a Theological Seminary was formed in Carcavelos, but moved to Lisbon in 1970. The denomination is the oldest non-Catholic church in Portugal. It is a member of the World Communion of Reformed Churches, the Communion of Protestant Churches in Europe, the Conference of European Churches and the World Council of Churches.

The Evangelical Presbyterian Church has approximately 25–30 congregations and 3,000 members, scattered in four presbyteries and one Synod. The denomination adheres to the Apostles Creed, Nicene Creed, Athanasian Creed and the Heidelberg Catechism.
