= National Council of Churches of Kenya =

Christian ecumenical group

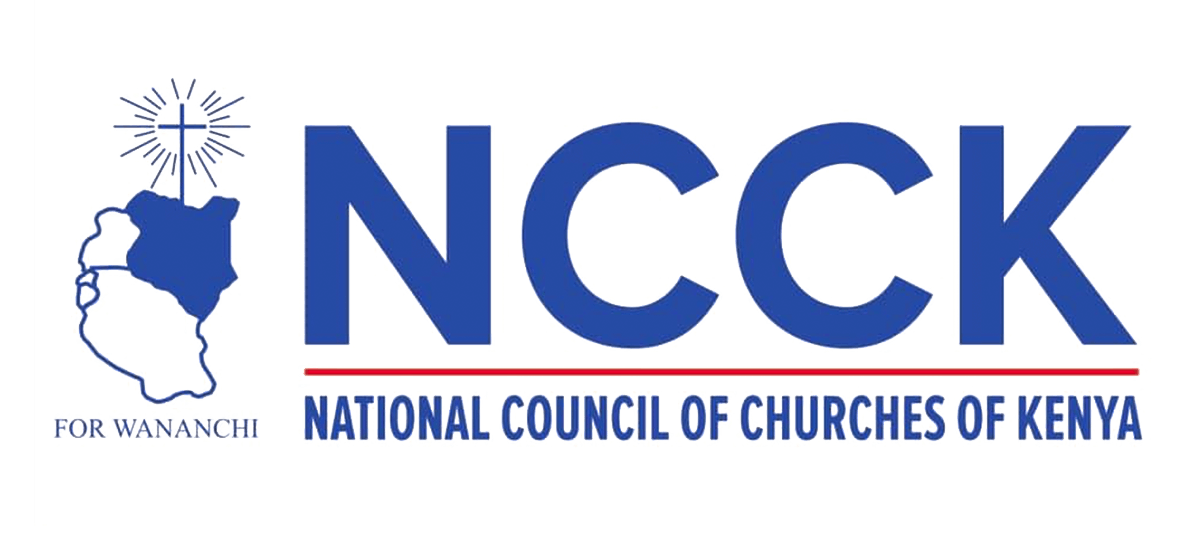
Logo of National Council of Churches of Kenya (NCCK).

The National Council of Churches of Kenya (NCCK), (in Swahili, Baraza kuu la makanisa nchini Kenya) is a fellowship of Protestant churches and Christian organisations registered in Kenya. It is currently Chaired by P.C.E.A's Rev. Dr. Elias Otieno Agola. Its motto is "For Wananchi" which means "for citizens" (Wananchi meaning citizens in Swahili): This motto has been exemplified in NCCK's long involvement in public service, advocacy, and social responsibility in Kenya. It is a member of the Fellowship of Christian Councils and Churches in the Great Lakes and Horn of Africa.

The NCCK was nominated for the 2023 Nobel Peace Prize

== Governance of the Council ==
As defined by the NCCK Constitution, the supreme body of NCCK is the General Assembly (GA), which meets once every three years, which has an executive committee which meets biannually. This committee has two sub-committees, namely, the Programme Committee, and the Finance and Administration committee. These committees meet regularly throughout the year, and work closely with the management team. The day-to-day operation of the council is the responsibility of management team under the leadership of the General Secretary who is also the chief executive officer of the council.

Officer of the Council	Name
Chairman	Rev. Dr Elias Otieno Agola
Vice Chairman	Bishop Dr John Okinda
Honorary Treasurer	Mr. John Thiong'o
General Secretary	Rev. Canon Chris Kinyanjui Kamau
Chairman, Finance & Administration Committee	Richard Kiplagat
Chairman, Program Committee	Bsp. Isaya Deye
Deputy General Secretary	Pst Sussie Ndanyi

Management Team

Position	Name
General Secretary	Rev. Canon Chris Kinyanjui Kamau
Deputy General Secretary	Pst Sussie Ndanyi
Chief of Party	Ms. Susie Ibutu
Director, Programmes	Phyllis Kamau
Head, Human Resource & Administration	Fridah Mbaya
Manager, Finance	Peter Mutiso

== Facilities ==
The council's headquarters are located at the Jumuia Place, Lenana Road, Nairobi. This facility also serves as the Nairobi region offices. NCCK maintains nine regional offices throughout Kenya as well as four conference or retreat centers namely:

- Jumuia Guest House, Kisumu
- Jumuia Conference and Country Home, Limuru
- Jumuia Conference and Beach Resort, Kanamai
- Jumuia Guest House, Nakuru

== History of NCCK ==
The Church of the Torch, Kikuyu, where NCCK was founded in 1913

Established in 1913, it has been a key player in mobilizing Kenyans in various political, economic, and social issues. As such, NCCK's story is intricately intertwined with Kenya's national historical narrative.

- 1844- Dr. Johann Ludwig Krapf, a German and the first missionary arrives in what would later become Kenya and starts work on the Coast. He is soon followed by other missionaries including Johannes Rebmann who establish several mission stations around the country.
- 1908- By now several issues face the missionaries who have greatly increased in number, including the need for commonality in the names referencing God in the different local languages and dialects. Two mission conferences are held that year in Kijabe and Maseno.
- 1909- Another conference is held in Kijabe, which paves the way for the formation of NCCK. A key resolution is made: "This Conference regards the development, organisation and establishment of a united self-governing, self-supporting and self-extending Native Church as the ideal in our Missionary Work."
- 1913- The first United Missionary Conference is held in June, in Thogoto, Kikuyu, Kenya, which nine missionary groups attend. A constitution proposing the formation of the Federation of Missions is discussed, and four missionary groups sign it. NCCK is born.
- 1918- At the second United Missionary Conference, the name of the organization is changed to Alliance of Protestant Missions.
- 1924- The membership is expanded beyond the original four members and the goals of the organization changed to be more representative od missionary activities and include African issues on health, education and rehabilitation of former soldiers. A new body called the Kenya Missionary Council is formed.
- 1943- As the country inches towards independence, there is need to broaden the membership to accommodate non-missionary Christian bodies. The objectives change once again, and the organization is then called Christian Council of Kenya (CCK).
- 1964- Independence is won. To reflect the new state of affairs, in 1966 the organization re-brands to National Christian Council of Kenya.
- 1984- The name of the organisation is changed to National Council of Churches of Kenya to reflect the fact that membership to the organisation is by churches and not individual Christians.

== Membership ==
NCCK has 50 member churches and organizations, who seek to facilitate the attainment of a united, just, peaceful and sustainable society. That is; 32 Member Churches, 13 Associate Members and 6 Fraternal Associate Members. These are:

=== Full Members ===
Africa Brotherhood Church
African Christian Churches and Schools
African Church of the Holy Spirit
Africa Independent Pentecostal Church of Africa
African Interior Church
African Israel Nineveh Church
African Orthodox Church in Kenya
Anglican Church of Kenya
Church of Africa Sinai Mission
Church of Christ in Africa
Church of God East Africa (Kenya)
Coptic Orthodox Church
Episcopal Church of Africa
Evangelical Lutheran Church in Kenya
Friends Church in Kenya
Free Pentecostal Fellowship of Kenya Full Gospel Churches of Kenya
Kenya Assemblies of God
Kenya Evangelical Lutheran Church
Kenya Mennonite Church
Lyahuka Church of East Africa
Maranatha Faith Assemblies
Methodist Church in Kenya
National Independent Church of Africa
Overcoming Faith Centre Church of Kenya
Pentecostal Evangelistic Fellowship of Africa
Presbyterian Church of East Africa
Reformed Church of East Africa
Salvation Army
Scriptural Holiness Mission
Zion Harvest Mission
Deeper Life Bible Church
Church of God Planters international churches

=== Associate Members ===
Bible Society of Kenya
Christian Churches Education Association
Christian Health Association of Kenya
Christian Hostels Fellowship Kenya United Independent Churches
Mt Zion Church Kayole Kenya Ecumenical Church Loan Fund
Christian Students Leadership Centre (Ufungamano House) Kenya Students Christian Fellowship
St Paul's University
Public Law Institute Young Women's Christian Association (World YWCA)
Young Men's Christian Association (YMCA)

=== Fraternal Members ===
African Evangelistic Enterprise
Daystar University
Fellowship of Christian Unions (FOCUS)
Trans World Radio
Trinity Fellowship
World Vision International
