= Church of the Brethren (Czech Republic) =

Evangelical free church in the Czech Republic and Slovakia

Church of Brethren
- Církev bratrská
- Classification: Protestant
- Orientation: Evangelical; Bohemian
- Polity: Congregationalist
- Associations: International Federation of Free Evangelical Churches; Conference of European Churches
- Headquarters: Prague, Czech Republic
- Origin: 1880
- Merger of: Czech Free Evangelical Church and Free Reformed Church
- Official website: portal.cb.cz cb.sk

Church of the Brethren (Czech: Církev bratrská) is an evangelical free church in the Czech Republic and Slovakia. It was formed in 1882 as the Free Reformed Church by merging the Czech Free Evangelical Church based in Bystré near Náchod, and the Free Reformed Church, which was formed by American Congregationalist missionaries in Prague. In the Czech Republic, the church reports having over 11,000 in almost 80 congregations. In Slovakia, it is organized in 22 congregations. The church is member of International Federation of Free Evangelical Churches and the ecumenical councils of churches in their respective countries.

== History ==
The Free Reformed Church (later: Church of the Brethren) was formed in 1882 by a merger of the Czech Free Evangelical Church (established in 1868 near Náchod) and the Free Reformed Church, which was founded in 1880 from the operation of Boston Mission Board missionaries in Prague. From the beginning, it was formed under strong Calvinist and evangelical influences. After 1918, the church rejected the merger with the newly created Evangelical Church of Czech Brethren and named itself the Unity of the Czech Brethren, to manifest the spiritual heritage of the original Unity of the Brethren. In 1951, after the 1948 Czechoslovak coup d'état, the Slovak Association of the Blue Cross and the Society of awakened Christians in Těšín with predominantly Polish members merged with the church. In 1967, the church adopted the new name Brethren Church to express the inclusion of non-Czech members. In 1993, following the Velvet Divorce the church legally separated into two independent churches, which closely cooperate on international level. The two churches organize an annual General Conference of the Church of the Brethren.

== Organization ==
The church is based upon semi-independent congregations, made up of members, who elect their own representatives into the council of elders ("staršovstvo"). Each congregation is also administered by an ordained pastor, and is subject to all the binding documents of the whole church. Individual congregations are regionally grouped into seniorates (Presbyteries), led by a senior pastor, who is also an ordinary pastor of a congregation. Officially, the church includes features of both Congregationalist and Presbyterian polities.
