= Evangelical Lutheran Church in Thailand =

Protestant denomination in Thailand

The Evangelical Lutheran Church in Thailand is a Lutheran denomination located in Thailand. It is a member of the Lutheran World Federation, which it joined in 1994. In 2018, this denomination saw its first women ordained into ministry, namely Jongkolnee Sampachanyanon Sim and Somporn Kulachote. It has approximately 5,000 members.
