= Evangelical Lutheran Church in Mozambique =

- Classification: Protestant
- Orientation: Lutheranism
- Region: Mozambique
- Origin: 1991
- Members: 18,163

The Evangelical Lutheran Church in Mozambique is an Evangelical Lutheran church in Mozambique. It was started as a mission effort by the Evangelical Lutheran Church in Tanzania in 1991, at that time consisting of only 11 converts. By 1997 the membership had reached 2,364. As of 2026, it has a membership of 18,163, and has been a member of the Lutheran World Federation since 1999. It is also affiliated with its regional expression, the Lutheran Communion in Southern Africa, and with the Christian Council of Mozambique. The church's head is Bishop Salomão Matsimbe
