= Kenya Evangelical Lutheran Church =

Protestant denomination in Kenya

The Kenya Evangelical Lutheran Church is a Lutheran denomination in Kenya. It is a member of the Lutheran World Federation, which it joined in 1992. It is also a member of the National Council of Churches of Kenya.

In 2025 Catherine Ngina Musau became the first woman to be elected bishop of the Kenya Evangelical Lutheran Church.
