= Evangelical Lutheran Church in Baden =

Lutheran denomination in Germany

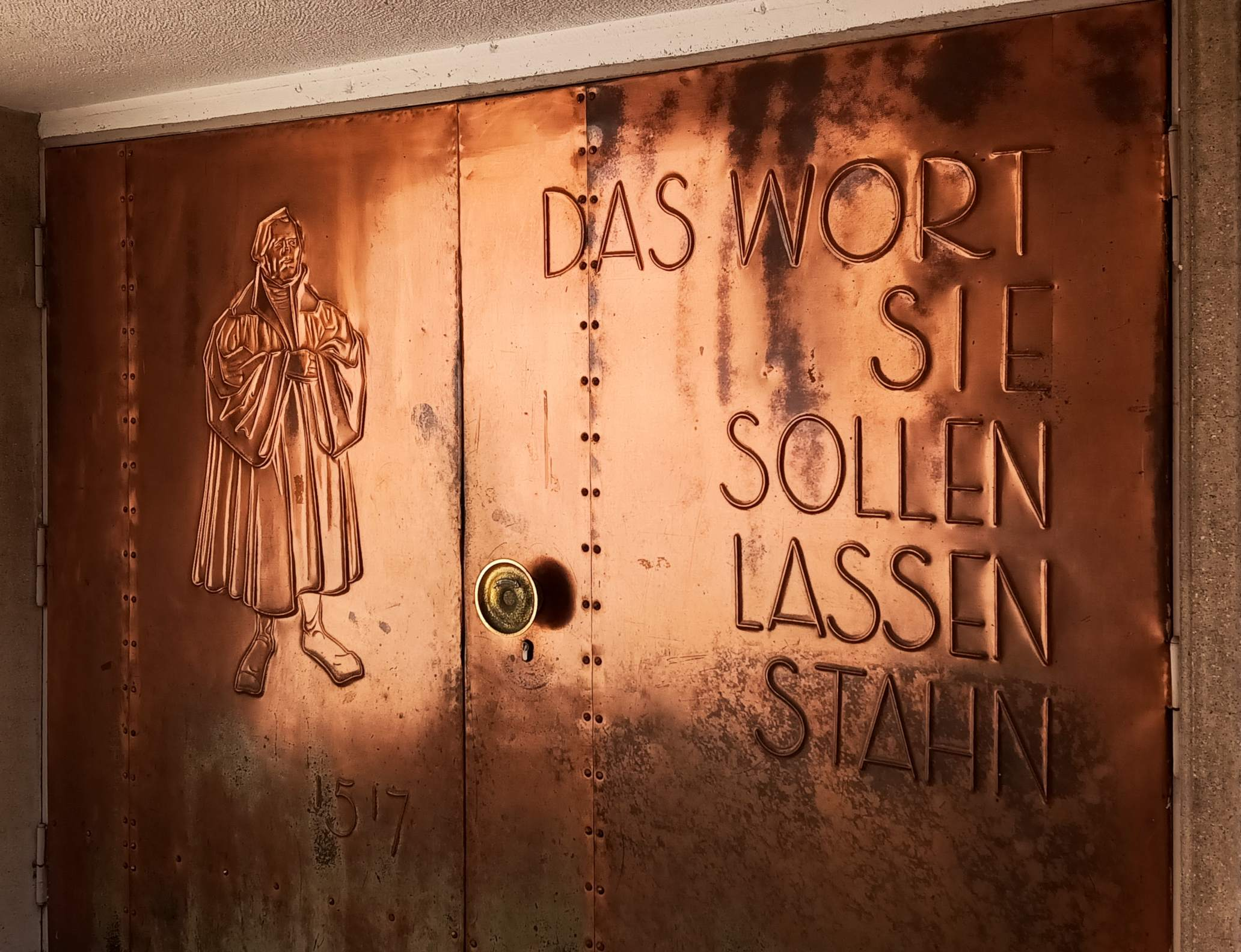
The door of the ELKiB church in Pforzheim

The Evangelical Lutheran Church in Baden (Evangelisch-Lutherische Kirche in Baden) is a Lutheran denomination in Germany.

It is a member of the Lutheran World Federation. It is also a member of the Conference of European Churches. There are about 3,500 members in seven congregations.
