= Protestant Christian Church in Mentawai =

Lutheran denomination in Indonesia

The Protestant Christian Church in Mentawai (GKPM) is a Lutheran denomination in Indonesia. It is rooted in the Rhenish mission, and became independent of it in 1978. It is a member of the Lutheran World Federation, which it joined in 1984.
