= Pakpak Dairi Christian Protestant Church =

Gereja Kristen Protestan Pakpak Dairi (Pakpak Dairi Protestant Christian Church)
- Classification: Lutheran
- Leader: Bishop Pdt. Abed Nego Padang Batanghari, M.Th
- Region: Indonesia
- Language: Batak Pakpak/Dairi
- Origin: 25 August 1991; Sumatra Utara
- Separated from: HKBP
- Members: 35.873

The Pakpak Dairi Christian Protestant Church (GKPPD - Gereja Kristen Protestan Pakpak Dairi) is a Lutheran denomination in Indonesia. It is a member of the Lutheran World Federation, which it joined in 2000. It is affiliated with the Communion of Churches in Indonesia. Its president is Bishop Abednego Padang Batanghari (Ephorus).
