= Evangelical Lutheran Church in Chile =

The Evangelical Lutheran Church in Chile (IELCH; Iglesia Evangélica Luterana en Chile) is a Lutheran denomination in Chile. It is a member of the Lutheran World Federation and is also a member of the World Council of Churches and the Latin American Council of Churches. Its president is Bishop Izani Bruch.

== History ==
The church traces its origins to the arrival of Lutheran German immigrants in Chile in the 1860s. In 1937, they founded the German Evangelical Church in Chile, which adopted its current name in 1959.

The church has 2,500 members in 13 parishes.
