= Bangladesh Northern Evangelical Lutheran Church =

Protestant denomination in Bangladesh

The Bangladesh Northern Evangelical Lutheran Church is a Lutheran denomination in Bangladesh. It became a member of the Lutheran World Federation in 1992.
