= Evangelical Church of the Lutheran Confession in Brazil =

Lutheran denomination in Brazil

- Igreja Evangélica de Confissão Luterana no Brasil
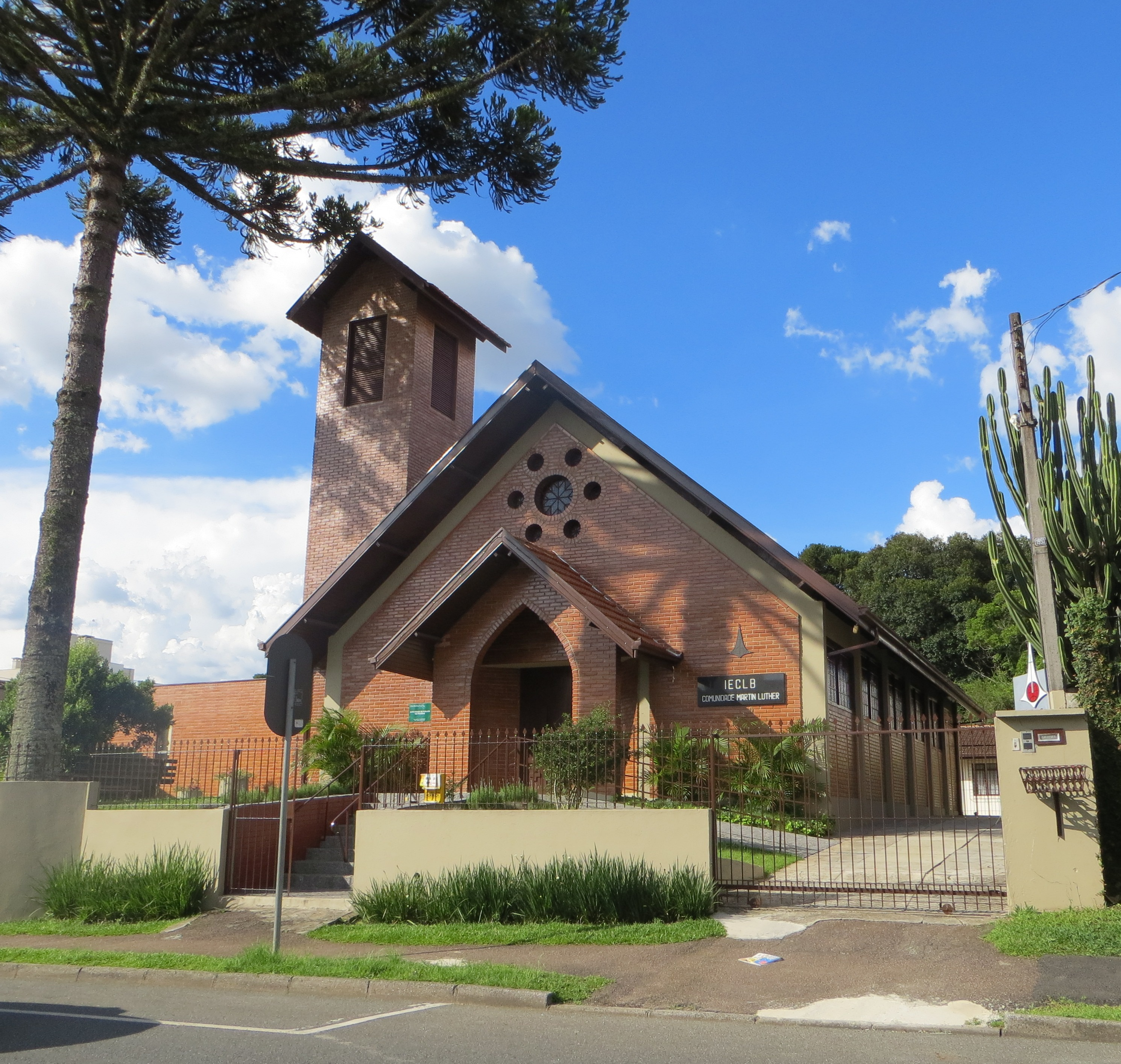
- A Lutheran church in Curitiba
- Abbreviation: IECLB
- Classification: Protestant
- Orientation: Lutheran
- Governance: Synodal
- Presiding Pastor: Silvia Beatrice Genz
- Associations: Lutheran World Federation; Latin American Council of Churches; National Council of Christian Churches; World Council of Churches
- Region: Brazil
- Headquarters: Porto Alegre, Rio Grande do Sul
- Origin: 1824
- Separated from: Protestant Church in Germany
- Merger of: Rio Grandense Synod, Evangelical Synod of Santa Catarina, Evangelical Synod of Santa Catarina, Paraná and other States, Evangelical Synod of Central Brazil
- Members: 634,286
- Official website: www.luteranos.com.br

The Evangelical Church of the Lutheran Confession in Brazil (Igreja Evangélica de Confissão Luterana no Brasil) is a Lutheran denomination in Brazil. It is a member of the Lutheran World Federation, which it joined in 1952. It is a member of the Latin American Council of Churches, the National Council of Christian Churches and the World Council of Churches. The denomination has 1.02 million adherents and 634,286 registered members.

The church ordains women as ministers. In 2011, the denomination released a pastoral letter accepting the Supreme Court's decision to allow same-sex civil marriage, although religious same-sex marriages are not allowed in the denomination, neither does it ordain clergy who are living in same-sex unions.
