= Evangelical Lutheran Church in Burma =

Protestant denomination in Burma

The Evangelical Lutheran Church in Myanmar (Lutheran Bethlehem Church) is a Lutheran denomination in Burma. It is a member of the Lutheran World Federation, which it joined in 2000. It is also a member of the Myanmar Council of Churches.
