= Protestantism in Japan =

Protestants in Japan constitute a religious minority of about 0.45% of total population or 600,000 people in 2020 (see Protestantism by country).

All major traditional Protestant denominations are present in the country, including Baptists, Pentecostals, Lutherans, Anglicanism, Methodists, Presbyterians, Mennonites, the Salvation Army and some others.

== Pre-World War II ==
=== Episcopalian and Anglican missions ===
==== Channing Moore Williams ====
In 1859 the first representatives of the Anglican Communion, the Rev., later Bishop, Channing Moore Williams and the Rev. John Liggins of the Episcopal Church in the United States of America arrived in Nagasaki, Japan. Williams and Liggins were followed to Nagasaki in January 1869 by Rev. George Ensor, representing the Church Missionary Society (CMS), which followed the Anglican traditions of the Church of England. In 1874 he was replaced by the Revd H Burnside at Nagasaki. The same year the CMS mission was expanded to include Revd C F Warren at Osaka, Revd Philip Fyson at Yokohama, Revd J Piper at Tokyo (Yedo), Revd H Evington at Niigata and Revd W Dening at Hokkaido. Revd H Maundrell joined the Japan mission in 1875 and served at Nagasaki. Revd John Batchelor was a missionary to the Ainu people of Hokkaido from 1877 to 1941. Hannah Riddell arrived in Kumamoto, Kyūshū in 1891. She worked to establish the Kaishun Hospital (known in English as the Kumamoto Hospital of the Resurrection of Hope) for the treatment of leprosy, with the hospital opening on 12 November 1895. Hannah Riddell left the CMS in 1900 to run the hospital.

Rev. Williams was appointed the Episcopal Bishop of China and Japan in 1866. He united various Anglican missionary efforts into one national church the Nippon Sei Ko Kai or Anglican-Episcopal Church in Japan, and went on in 1874 to establish Rikkyo University. After the Meiji Restoration, significant new legislation relating to the freedom of religion was introduced in 1871, facilitating in September 1873, the arrival in Tokyo of Rev. Alexander Croft Shaw and the Rev. W. Ball Wright, the first missionaries sent to Japan by the Society for the Propagation of the Gospel. In 1888 the Anglican Church of Canada also began missionary work in Japan.

=== Presbyterian missions ===
==== James Curtis Hepburn ====
On 18 October, 1859, Dr. James Curtis Hepburn, a medical missionary associated with the American Presbyterian Mission, and his wife arrived in Yokohama, where they stayed in a Buddhist temple, Jobutsu-ji in Kanagawa Ward. He promptly opened a clinic in nearby Soko-ji, another Buddhist temple. However, it was ordered to close. He did not open another clinic for the next four years, instead devoting his time to his study of the Japanese language.

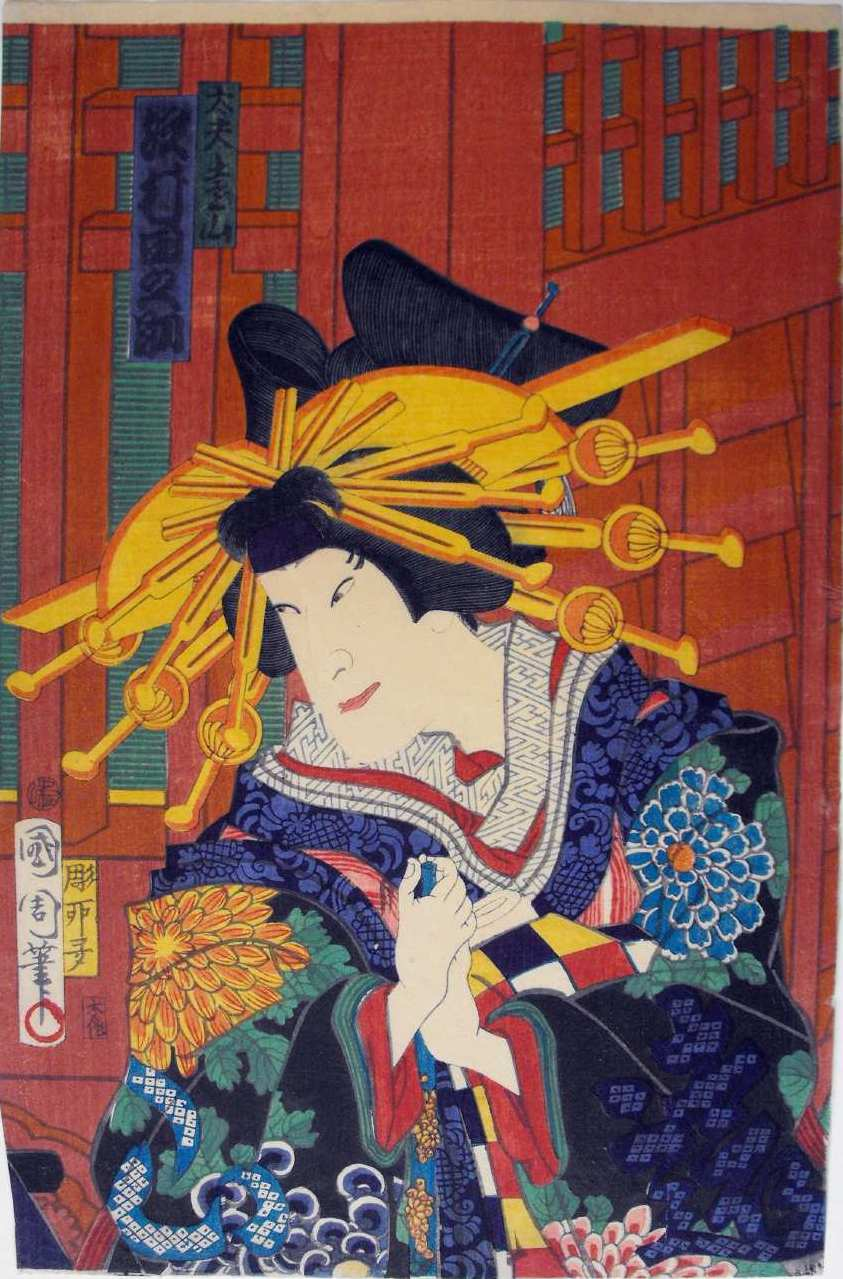
An Ukiyo-e print of Sawamura Tanosuke III in one of his roles

In May 1863, he opened another clinic in the Yokohama Foreign Settlement, specialized in optometry, but providing a wide range of medical services, including surgery. At this clinic, he gained fame for amputating the feet of the famous Kabuki actor, Sawamura Tanosuke III, due to gangrene.

In November of that same year, Hepburn opened his second clinic, and he and his wife Clara opened a school which taught a number of high-profile individuals: Hayashi Tadasu, Takahashi Korekiyo, and Masuda Takashi, among others. Clara taught English; Hepburn taught medical science.

Later, in 1867, Hepburn would publish the results of his long study of Japanese, a Japanese-English dictionary. This dictionary contained Hepburn romanization, which is still the most common form of Romaji.

By 1887, the Hepburn Academy, which had merged with a number of other missionary projects, had become Meiji Gakuin University of Shirokane. Hepburn was the school's first president. Famed poet and novelist, Tōson Shimazaki, was a member of the first graduating class and wrote the school song.

==== Divie Bethune McCartee ====
Divie Bethune McCartee was a notable Presbyterian Christian missionary to visit Japan in 1861–1862. His gospel tract translated into the Japanese language was among the first Protestant literature in Japan. In 1865 McCartee moved back to Ningbo, China, but others have followed in his footsteps.

The Japanese responded favorably to the gospel in the late 19th century when Japan re-opened its doors to the West. However, this was followed by renewed suspicion and rejection of Christian teaching. The growth of Protestantism was slowed dramatically in the early 20th century because of pressure caused by criticism and the influence of the military government.

== Post-World War II ==
The post-World War II years have seen increasing activity by evangelicals, initially with American influence, and some growth occurred between 1945 and 1960. The Japan Evangelical Association was founded in 1968.

The Japanese Bible Society was established in 1937 with the help of National Bible Society of Scotland (NBSS, now called the Scottish Bible Society), the American Bible Society, the British and Foreign Bible Society.

Starting in 1957, the Wisconsin Evangelical Lutheran Synod sent several missionaries to Japan. In 1962, the Lutheran Evangelical Christian Church (LECC) was formed in Japan. The LECC was one of the founding members of the international Confessional Evangelical Lutheran Conference.

By some estimations, there are 3,000 Protestant churches in Tokyo, and 7,700 Protestant churches in all of Japan. There are several Christian TV and radio ministries broadcasting over commercial stations in the country. By law, religious organizations are not granted licenses to own and operate over the air broadcast stations.

== See also ==
- Anglican Church in Japan also known as Nippon Sei Ko Kai
- Christianity in Japan
- Religion in Japan
- Japan Evangelical Lutheran Church
- Japan Lutheran Church
- Japan Baptist Convention
- Japan Baptist Association
- True Jesus Church in Japan
- Japanese Bible Society
- Reformed Church in Japan
- United Church of Christ in Japan
- Presbyterian Church in Japan
