= Federation of Evangelical Lutheran Churches in Switzerland and the Principality of Liechtenstein =

Christian denomination in Switzerland and Liechtenstein

The Federation of Evangelical Lutheran Churches in Switzerland and Liechtenstein (German: Bund Evangelisch-Lutherischer Kirchen in der Schweiz und im Fürstentum Liechtenstein; French: Fédération des Églises évangéliques luthériennes en Suisse et dans la principauté du Liechtenstein) is an organization of 10 Lutheran churches in Basel and Northwestern Switzerland, Bern, Geneva, Zurich, and Vaduz (Liechtenstein).

== History ==
It was founded in 1967 and represented 6500 baptized members in 1999, decreasing to 3,794 baptized members by the end of 2019. It is a member of the Lutheran World Federation since 1979.

== Beliefs ==
=== Marriage ===
The Evangelical Lutheran Church in Geneva offers church services for same-sex civil partnerships.

== Organization ==
The mission of the federation is to promote the unity of the member congregations.

Decisions are made through a convention that takes place every two years. Members of the convention include three representatives from each of the five churches, among these are the pastors of each congregation.

The federation convention votes for a president, a vice president, a secretary, and a treasurer for two year terms.

== See also ==
- Religion in Liechtenstein
- Religion in Switzerland
