= Japan Baptist Association =

The Japan Baptist Association (日本バプテスト連合, Nippon Baputesuto Rengō) is a Landmark Independent Baptist denomination in Japan, related to the American Baptist Association. Its origins go back to 1952, when Eugene M. Reagan from Texas began missionary activity.
