= Evangelical Church in the Republic of Croatia =

Lutheran denomination in Croatia

Evangelical (Lutheran) Church in Croatia
- Classification: Protestant
- Orientation: Lutheran
- Polity: Episcopal
- Bishop: Branko Berić
- Region: Croatia
- Headquarters: Ulica Ivana Gundulića 28, Zagreb, Croatia
- Origin: 16th century
- Congregations: 13
- Members: 3,300 (2023)
- Official website: www.ecrh.hr

The Evangelical Church in the Republic of Croatia (Croatian: Evangelička (luteranska) crkva u Hrvatskoj or ECRH) is a Lutheran denomination in Croatia. It is a member of the Lutheran World Federation, which it joined in 1951. It is also a member of the Conference of European Churches and the Community of Protestant Churches in Europe. In 2023, the church reported about 3,300 members.
