= Evangelical Lutheran Church in Malawi =

- Classification: Protestant
- Orientation: Lutheranism
- Region: Malawi
- Members: 100,000

The Evangelical Lutheran Church in Malawi is an Evangelical Lutheran church in Malawi. It has a membership of 100,000, and has been a member of the Lutheran World Federation since 1988. It is also affiliated with its regional expression, the Lutheran Communion in Southern Africa. The church's head is Bishop Joseph P. Bvumbwe.
