= Evangelical Church of Czech Brethren =

Czech Protestant church

- Classification: Protestant
- Orientation: United; Lutheran; Reformed; Bohemian
- Polity: Presbyterian
- Synodal Senior: Pavel Pokorný
- Synodal Curator: Jiří Schneider
- Associations: World Council of Churches; Communion of Protestant Churches in Europe; Conference of European Churches; Lutheran World Federation; World Communion of Reformed Churches.
- Region: Czech Republic
- Founder: Josef Souček
- Origin: 17 December 1918; Czechoslovakia
- Separated from: Reformed Church in Austria; Protestant Church of the Augsburg Confession in Austria
- Aid organization: Diakonie ČCE
- Publications: Český bratr
- Official website: www.e-cirkev.cz

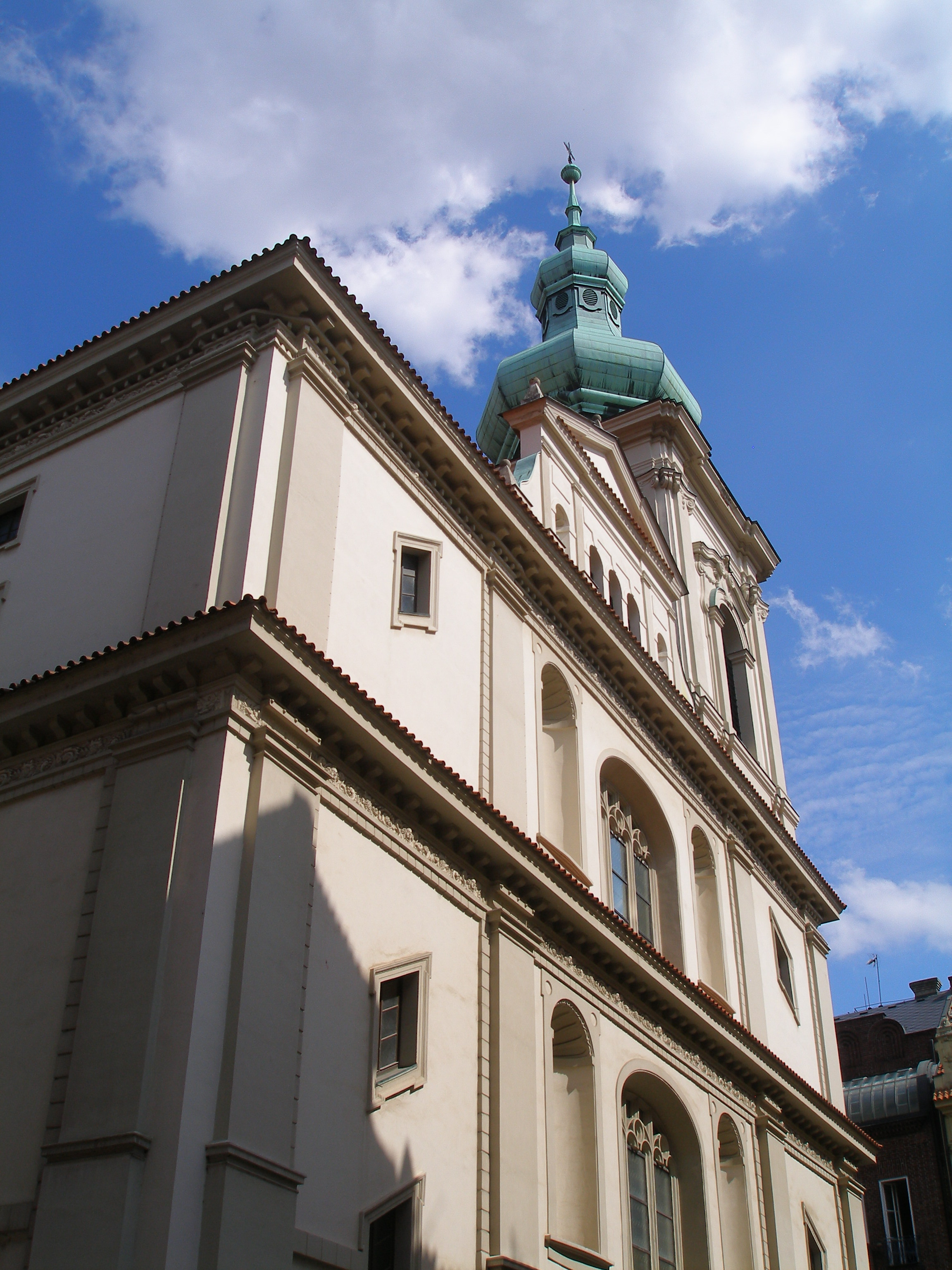
Evangelical Church of the Savior in the Old Town of Prague – main church of the ECCB

The Evangelical Church of Czech Brethren (ECCB; Czech: Českobratrská církev evangelická, ČCE) is the largest Czech Protestant church and the second-largest church in the Czech Republic after the Catholic Church. It was formed in 1918 in Czechoslovakia through the unification of the Protestant churches of the Lutheran and Calvinist confessions.

In 2019, the church reported 69,715 baptized members in more than 260 local congregations, which are broken down into 14 seniorates (presbyteries) throughout the Czech Republic. Its membership peaked in 1950 with 402,000 members. Since the end of Communist rule, the Czech Republic's censuses have recorded 203,996 adherents in 1991, 117,212 in 2001, and 51,936 in 2011.

In May 2023, the Church synod voted to allow blessing of same-sex couples.

== History ==
Reformation in the Czech lands started already in the 15th century, one century before Luther's Reformation. At that time, most Czechs (~85%) were Protestant; there were two Protestant churches: the Utraquist Hussite Church (1431–1620) and the Unity of the Brethren (1457–1620). (The latter was in the 1720s partially renewed outside of Czech territory as the Moravian Church.) However, non-Catholic churches were forbidden in 1620 when the Bohemian Revolt was decisively defeated and victorious Habsburg rulers imposed harsh Counter-Reformation measures on the Bohemian Crown. This ban was mitigated in 1781 by issuing the Patent of Toleration that permitted Lutheran and Calvinist churches in the Habsburg monarchy but Protestants obtained full equality with the Catholic church legally only as late as in 1867, when Austria-Hungary was created. Nevertheless, other minor churches were still forbidden until the founding of Czechoslovakia in 1918.

The ECCB was established in 1918 by the unification of most Lutheran and Calvinist churches in Bohemia, Moravia, and Silesia. It was intended to be a successor of the Unity of the Brethren (and the Bohemian Reformation in general). Some Lutheran churches in Silesia chose not to join, forming instead the Silesian Evangelical Church of the Augsburg Confession. There were also initial talks of a merger with the Evangelical Church of the Augsburg Confession in Slovakia, but the merger was ultimately rejected since Slovak Lutherans felt the ECCB had a Czech nationalistic character, and the ECCB made no further attempts to establish itself in Slovak lands. The two churches still maintained close ecumenical relations.

== Affiliations ==
The ECCB is a member of the World Council of Churches, the Communion of Protestant Churches in Europe, the Conference of European Churches, the Lutheran World Federation, and the World Communion of Reformed Churches.
