= Malagasy Protestant Church in France =

Lutheran Christian denomination in France

The Malagasy Protestant Church in France (French: Église protestante malagache en France; Malagasy: Fiangonana Protestanta Malagasy aty Andafy) (FPMA) was founded in 1959 by Malagasy students in France with the agreement of the Federation of Protestant Churches in Madagascar. Its members belonged to the Church of Jesus Christ in Madagascar and the Lutheran Church in Madagascar living in France. It has 39 parishes with 8,000 members and of whom 6,000 are baptised members and 4,000 admitted to Lord supper. The Heidelberg Catechism, Apostles Creed, Athanasian Creed and Nicene Creed are the officially recognised confessions.

Since 1999, it is a full member of the World Communion of Reformed Churches.
