= Evangelical Church of the Augsburg Confession in Slovenia =

Lutheran denomination in Slovenia

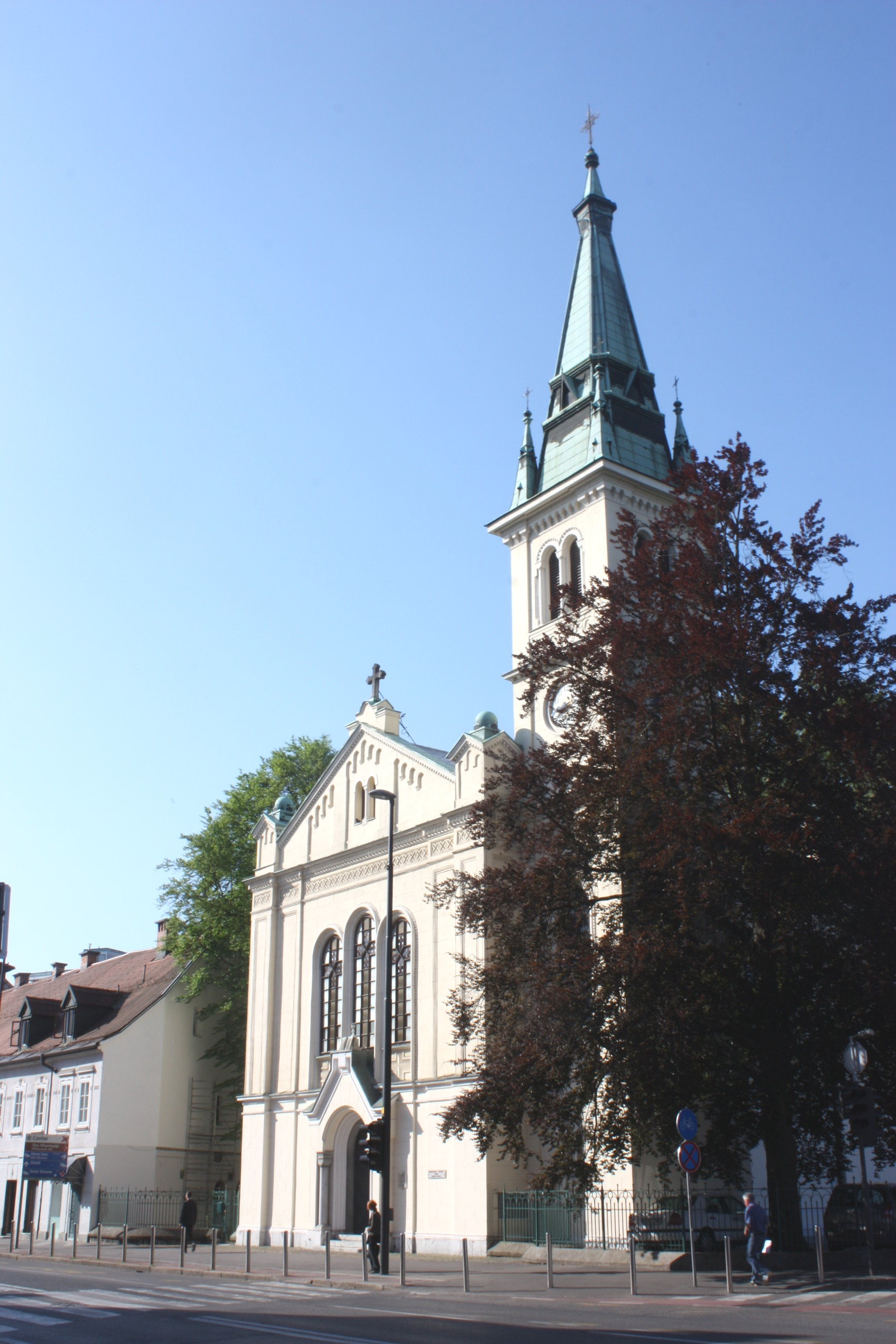
The Lutheran Church named after Primož Trubar in Ljubljana, capital of Slovenia.

The Evangelical Church of the Augsburg Confession in Slovenia (Slovene: Evangeličanska cerkev augsburške veroizpovedi v Sloveniji) is a Lutheran denomination in Slovenia. It is led by Bishop Aleksander Erniša. It is a member of the Lutheran World Federation, which it joined in 1952. It is also a member of the Conference of European Churches and the Community of Protestant Churches in Europe.

== Origins and Early Reformation ==
The Evangelical Church in Carniola was founded in the 16th century, when reformer Primož Trubar first translated Martin Luther's catechism and parts of the New Testament into Slovene. Soon after, Jurij Dalmatin completed a full translation of the Bible, which became the central text for Slovenian Protestant churches of the time. Luther's teachings spread rapidly among Slovene-speaking believers.

In Prekmurje, the Reformation was led by noble landowners, including the magnate families Szechy and Nádasdy. A key figure was the Styrian nobleman Karl von Herberstorff, who later became the first inspector of the Evangelical Church in the region now known as Prekmurje.

== Counter-Reformation and Survival ==
During the Counter-Reformation, the Habsburg monarchy and the Roman Catholic Church suppressed Protestantism throughout Slovenia. Only in Hungary, which included Slovene-speaking areas such as the Slovene March (Prekmurje and Porabje), did the Slovenian Evangelical Church survive—in two parishes: Šurd and Čobin.

In Prekmurje, many magnates converted to Catholicism under pressure, and their subjects followed. However, several lower and middle-ranking noble families—such as the Berke of Sebeborci, the Panker of Kuštanovci, and the Kerčmar of Kukeč—continued to support Protestantism. These families resisted the seizure of Protestant churches until 1733, when local authorities requested German military intervention.

== Toleration and Parish Foundations ==
Following the issuance of the Toleration Patent by Emperor Joseph II in 1781, the Evangelical Church was permitted to re-establish its presence in Prekmurje. In 1783, three parishes were founded: Puconci, Križevci, and Hodoš. The first worship service was held in Puconci on 12 October 1783, led by Mihael Bakoš, the first pastor of Križevci. These developments marked the beginning of a renewed Evangelical presence in the region.

== 19th Century Expansion ==
In the 19th century, German-speaking Protestants established new Evangelical parishes in Ljubljana, Celje, and Maribor. These communities were primarily composed of immigrants and merchants who brought Lutheran traditions to urban centers outside Prekmurje. After World War II, these parishes were suppressed under the new political regime, but they were gradually reopened in the 1950s. Today, the congregations in these cities are mostly composed of descendants of Prekmurje migrants and other Slovene Protestants.

== Prekmurje Seniorat ==
In 1919, following the Treaty of Trianon and the incorporation of Prekmurje into the Kingdom of Serbs, Croats and Slovenes, ten Evangelical parishes separated from the Sombotel Diocese in Hungary. In 1922, these parishes officially formed the Prekmurje Evangelical Seniorat, with its seat in Murska Sobota. The seniorat was led by Števan Kovatš, who became its first and only senior. In 1941, the seniorat was dissolved, but Kovatš and Josip Benko were later honored with the title of honorary senior.

== Modern Organization and Leadership ==
In 1977, the Evangelical Church of the Augsburg Confession in Slovenia adopted a formal statute outlining its organizational structure and governance. In 2002, Geza Erniša was elected as the church's first bishop, marking a significant milestone in its modern development. The church is currently led by Aleksander Erniša who serves as bishop.

The denomination is a member of the Lutheran World Federation, which it joined in 1952, and also belongs to the Conference of European Churches and the Community of Protestant Churches in Europe. While most congregations follow traditional Lutheran liturgy, the church is notable for being one of the few Eastern Lutheran bodies that incorporate elements of the Byzantine Rite.
