= World Mission Prayer League =

Christian organization

- Formation: 1945; 81 years ago
- Headquarters: Minneapolis, Minnesota, U.S.; Camrose, Alberta, Canada
- Key people: John Carlsen; Ernest Weinhardt; Lars Olsen Skrefsrud
- Website: wmpl.org

The World Mission Prayer League (WMPL) is a pan-Lutheran fellowship committed to Christian prayer as a working method of mission.

WMPL exists as an international community of approximately 6,000 members with formal offices in the United States (Minneapolis, Minnesota) and Canada (Camrose, Alberta). The Prayer League supports approximately 120 workers serving in twenty countries throughout Africa, Asia, North America, and South America.

== History ==
The first international workers were sent in 1904 by the World Mission Prayer League's predecessor agency, the American Board of the Santal Mission. They joined the Santal Mission work in India, sponsored by sister agencies in Norway and Denmark, that had been under way since 1867. By the mid-1930s, a band of students, pastors, and friends in the Minneapolis, Minnesota, area joined together to approach the foreign mission boards of the existing Lutheran synods, but they found no budget for new outreach. In 1937, they organized themselves to accept missionary volunteers and send them into areas of special concern, without the constraint of budgetary limitations. They were committed to providing a way for lay participation in mission, without the requirement of ordination, and to complement the regular work of the Lutheran synods without diverting means or personnel from their programs.

The mission was formally organized on May 25, 1937, as the South American Mission Prayer League. Its first two missionaries left the next year for Bolivia. Later, other volunteers were sent to Central Asia, and eventually to Africa and Eastern Europe. In 1939, the Mission adopted its present name, the World Mission Prayer League, to reflect its growing involvement around the world. In 1945, the League adopted its constitution and incorporated in the state of Minnesota. In 1969, a sister organization, the World Mission Prayer League/Canada, adopted its constitution and incorporated in Edmonton, Alberta.

In 1972, the American Board of the Santal Mission merged with the World Mission Prayer League. The American Board had been founded in Minneapolis in 1894, as the American partner of the Norwegian Board and the Danish Board of the same Mission. The World Mission Prayer League has inherited their particular concern for the Santal people of India and Bangladesh.

== Activities ==
- Pioneering evangelism
- Church planting
- Medical care
- Teaching English
- Adult education
- Missionary children's education
- Human trafficking rescue and prevention
- Radio ministries
- Business as mission
- Administration
- Bible translation
- Leadership formation
- Missionary mobilization
- Addiction recovery
- Children's discipleship
