= National Christian Council in Japan =

Christian ecumenical organization

The National Christian Council in Japan (日本キリスト教協議会, Nihon Kirisuto-kyō Kyōgikai) is a Christian ecumenical organization founded in 1948. It is a member of the World Council of Churches and the Christian Conference of Asia.

In 1958, the council set up the NCC Center for the Study of Japanese Religions; the center is involved in research and interreligious dialogue.

== See also ==
- National Council of Churches in Korea
- National Christian Council of China
