= Chinese Rhenish Church Hong Kong Synod =

Lutheran denomination in Hong Kong

The Chinese Rhenish Church Hong Kong Synod (Chinese: 中華基督教禮賢會香港區會) is a Lutheran denomination in Hong Kong. It is a member of the Lutheran World Federation, which it joined in 1974. It is affiliated with the Hong Kong Lutheran Federation Ltd.

== See also ==
- Lutheran Church of China
