= Latin American Council of Churches =

The Latin American Council of Churches (Consejo Latinoamericano de Iglesias) is a regional ecumenical body with 139 member churches and organizations in 19 countries, representing some two million Christians. The head office of the organization is in Quito, Ecuador. It was founded in 1982.

== Members ==
- Andean region
- National Council of Christian Churches in Brazil
- Caribbean Conference of Churches
- Mesoamerica Region
- Rio de la Plata region
