= Lutheranism by region =

Aspect of religion

Lutherans

Total population
- c. 77 million+ (worldwide, 2020)

Regions with significant populations
- Germany: 10,814,631
- Ethiopia: 10,404,128
- Tanzania: 7,916,253
- Indonesia: 7,771,178
- Sweden: 5,900,000
- India: 4,386,957
- Denmark: 4,339,511
- Madagascar: 5,356,456
- Finland: 3,800,000
- Norway: 3,746,308
- United States: 5,318,279

Scriptures
- Bible (Old and New Testament)

Lutheranism is present on all inhabited continents with an estimated 110 million adherents out of which 74.2 million are affiliated with the Lutheran World Federation. As a major movement that first began the Reformation, it constitutes one of the largest Protestant branches claiming around 110 million out of 920 million Protestants. The Lutheran World Federation brings together the majority of Lutherans. Apart from it, there are also other organizations such as the International Lutheran Council and the Confessional Evangelical Lutheran Conference, as well as multiple independent Lutheran denominations.

Today, almost half of Lutherans are living in Europe. Germany accounts for one-third of European Lutherans and one-eighth of the world's Lutheran population. Most of the remaining European Lutherans are confined to the Lutheran-majority Nordic countries and to a lesser extent the Central European countries of Hungary, Slovakia, Romania (notably Transylvania) Austria, Czechia and Slovenia. United States accounts for one-eighth of the world's Lutheran population, but only around 4 million of them are members in the Lutheran World Federation. (Note: This numbers represents the Lutheran World Federation membership in the United States. According to Pew Research Center, all Lutherans in and outside this organization account for 2% of the U.S. population or around 6,800,000.) It has the most Lutherans in North America. Ethiopia and Tanzania have the largest Lutheran populations in Africa, while Indonesia in Asia, Papua New Guinea in Oceania and Brazil in South America have the largest in their respective continents.

== Africa ==
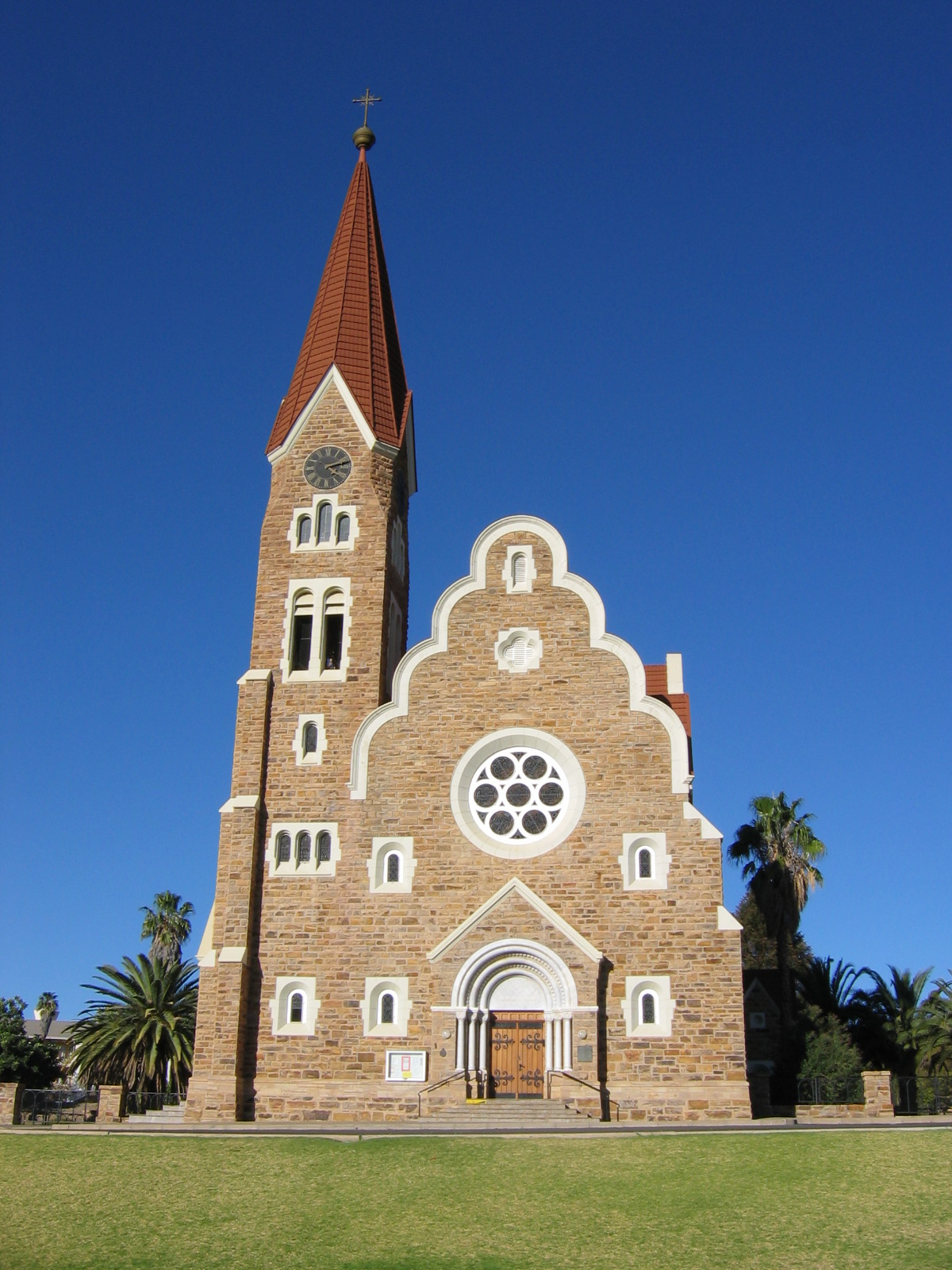
Christ Church, Windhoek, a historical landmark and Lutheran church in Windhoek, Namibia, belonging to the German-speaking Evangelical Lutheran Church in Namibia

Namibia has the highest proportion of Lutherans of any country in Africa, at about 50% of the country's population, and is the only country outside Europe to have a Lutheran majority. Other African countries with significant Lutheran populations include Eritrea, Ethiopia, Madagascar, and Tanzania.

- Africa – The Lutheran World Federation
- Lutheran Communion in Central and Eastern Africa
- Lutheran Communion in Western Africa
- Lutheran Communion in Southern Africa
- Lutherans in Africa

== Asia ==
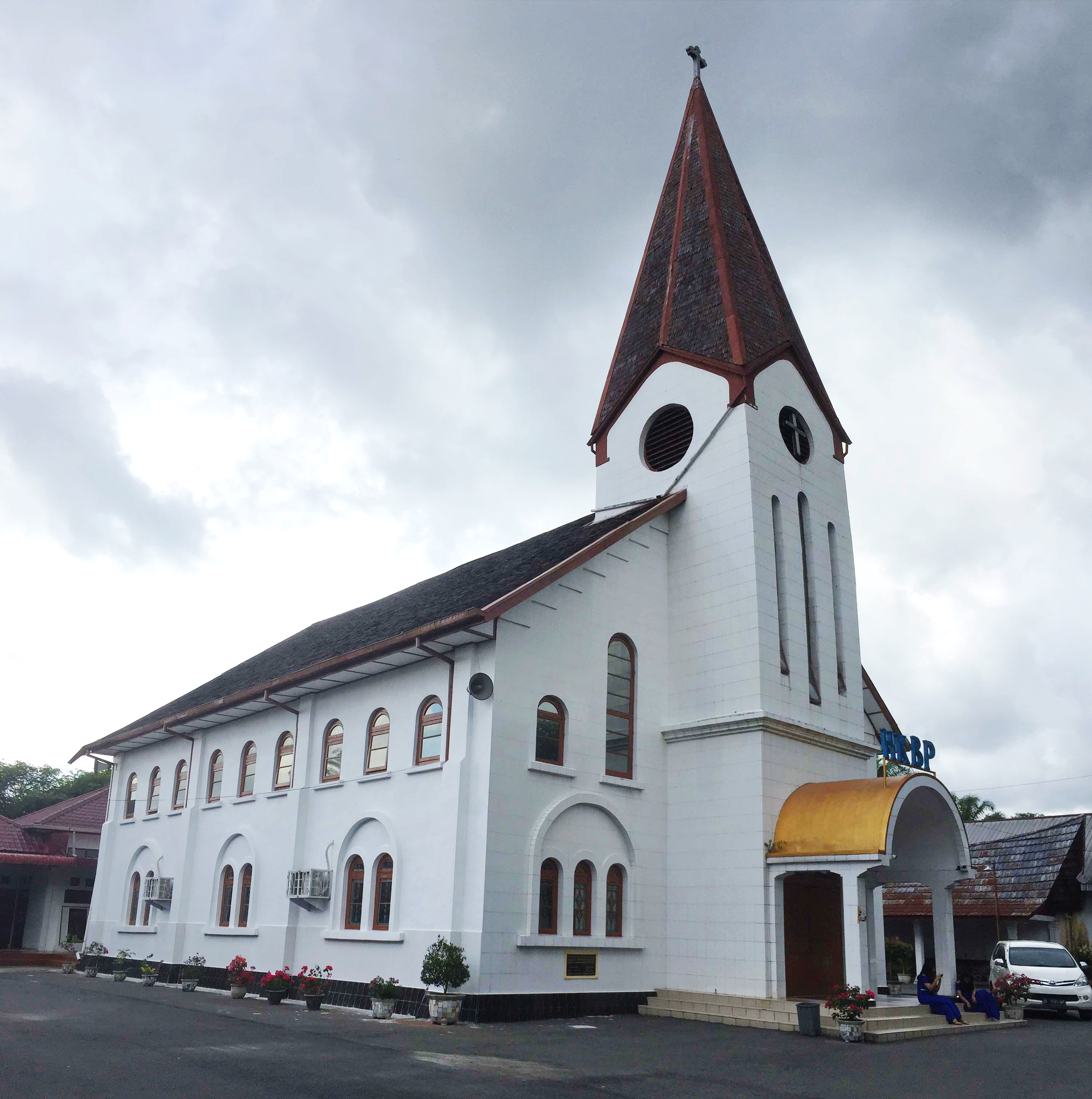
The building of a congregation belonging to the Batak Christian Protestant Church in North Sumatra, Indonesia

The largest national Lutheran community in Asia is found in Indonesia. According to the Lutheran World Federation list of member churches, thirteen Indonesian Lutheran churches or synods (the latest one added in 2014) associated with the LWF claim more than 6.7 million members. The largest of these is the Batak Christian Protestant Church (Indonesian: Huria Kristen Batak Protestan), which comprises almost 4.2 million members. Lutherans in India number more than 3.5 million, the largest being the 2.5-million-member Andhra Evangelical Lutheran Church. Smaller Lutheran communities exist elsewhere, including Hong Kong SAR, Malaysia, Myanmar, and Japan.

- Asia – The Lutheran World Federation
- Asia Lutheran Communion

== Europe ==
Membership and attendance of services in Lutheran churches, as for all of the large, state-affiliated European churches are low and decreasing. Church attendance on Sundays is no longer the norm. Often, people attend religious services only for baptisms, confirmations, weddings, funerals, and possibly at Christmas and Easter. Traditionally, the Lutheran youth would receive preparatory confirmation classes for one to two years around age 14, to introduce them to Christian doctrines. A large confirmation service is held once the series is completed. In some areas confirmation is now delayed until the end of the high school.

Except in Northern Europe (see below), Germany and Austria, very few seminaries are state-supported. The training for students in theology embraces a wide range of theologies including modern and contemporary movements in biblical criticism and theology. Due to agreements like the Leuenberg Agreement (1973), most Lutheran churches in Europe have church fellowship with other churches arising from the Reformation, such as the Reformed and Methodist churches.

=== Germany ===
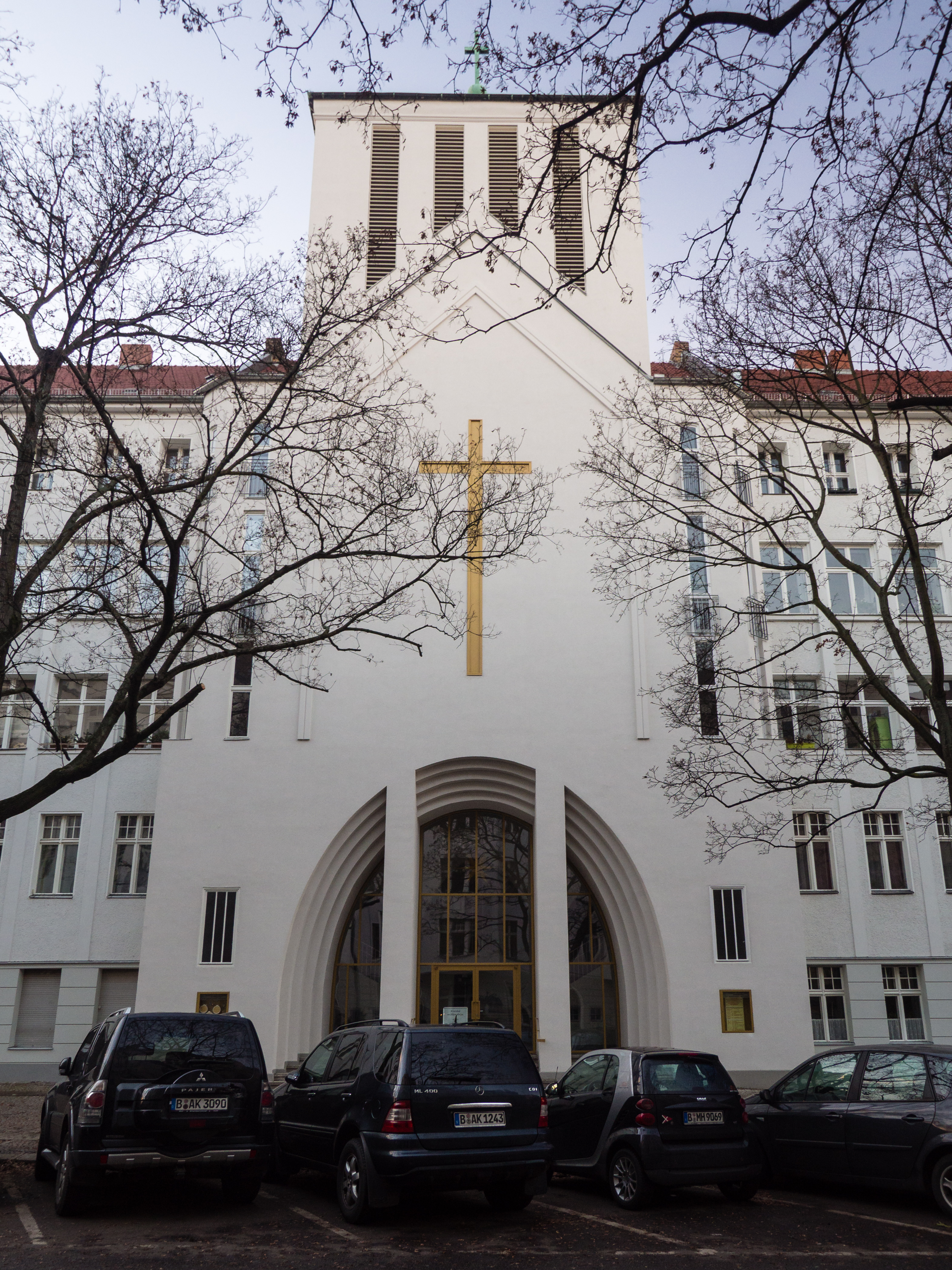
Holy Cross Lutheran Church in Berlin, a congregation belonging to the Independent Evangelical-Lutheran Church which originated from opposition of Old Lutherans to form the Prussian Union of churches

The Lutheran faith was first established in some states of the Holy Roman Empire then and now located within Germany. After the Thirty Years' War ended in 1648, the Lutheran, Reformed and Catholic churches were recognised as independent churches. The ruler of each principality was given the right to choose one of these three denominations to become the state church of his principality (Cuius regio, eius religio). Some German states (especially in the north and east) became Lutheran (e.g. Brunswick, Hanover, Oldenburg, Saxony, Baden), some became Reformed (Bentheim, Bremen, Lippe), while others remained Catholic (e.g. Bavaria and areas along the Rhine). Some states saw unions of Reformed and Lutherans to a united confession, such as Anhalt (1820 in Anhalt-Bernburg, 1827 in Anhalt-Dessau, and 1880 in Anhalt-Köthen), Baden (1821), Nassau (1817) and the Bavarian Palatinate (1848), while Prussia introduced an administrative-only Union of Lutheran and Reformed churches in 1817, followed by the also administrative-only Hanau Union of churches in Hesse-Cassel (1818) and a united administration for Lutheran, Reformed and Protestant union congregations in Hesse-Darmstadt (1832) and in Bremen (1877).

The regional Protestant church bodies (traditionally organised mostly along 19th-century state borders, often changed since) accept each other as equals, despite confessional differences. Thus, a Lutheran moving from a parish belonging to a Lutheran regional church body would be accepted by the locally competent congregation within another regional Protestant church body, even if this church body and its local parish are Reformed or of united Protestant confession. This is a concept rather unusual in most other countries. Members of congregations within the regional Protestant church bodies – like those of parishes within Catholic dioceses and those enrolled in Jewish congregations –, are required to pay a church tax, a surcharge on their normal income tax collected by the states of Germany and passed on to the respective religious body.

Modern mobility and increased secularisation have, however, been instrumental in shifting the traditional demographic situation, as did the movements of several million German refugees from either areas lost to Poland and the Soviet Union, or from abroad, after World War II. Since World War II, the Lutheran, Reformed and United Protestant regional churches have been members of the umbrella Evangelical Church in Germany (EKD). Approximately 40% of German Protestants are members of regional church bodies forming the United Evangelical Lutheran Church of Germany (VELKD), a unit of the EKD comprising all Lutheran regional church bodies in Germany, except of Oldenburg and Württemberg, however, which are only associated. The majority of parishioners belonging to administratively united Protestant church bodies in Germany are also members of parishes which are confessionally Lutheran, however, their membership registries do not differentiate between Lutherans and parishioners of Reformed or united Protestant confession.

Besides the regional Protestant church bodies in Germany, there also exists the national Independent Evangelical-Lutheran Church (SELK), which formed from those opposed to the forced Union with Reformed churches in Prussia and elsewhere. The SELK is a member of the International Lutheran Council (ILC). The SELK is separate from the regional church bodies and has 33,474 baptised members as of 2017. The Evangelical Lutheran Free Church (CELC), primarily located in the lands of the former East Germany, has 1,470 baptised members. The German parishioners of the Moravian Church, which is a member of the Lutheran World Federation, are also confessionally counting as Lutherans.

=== Nordic countries ===
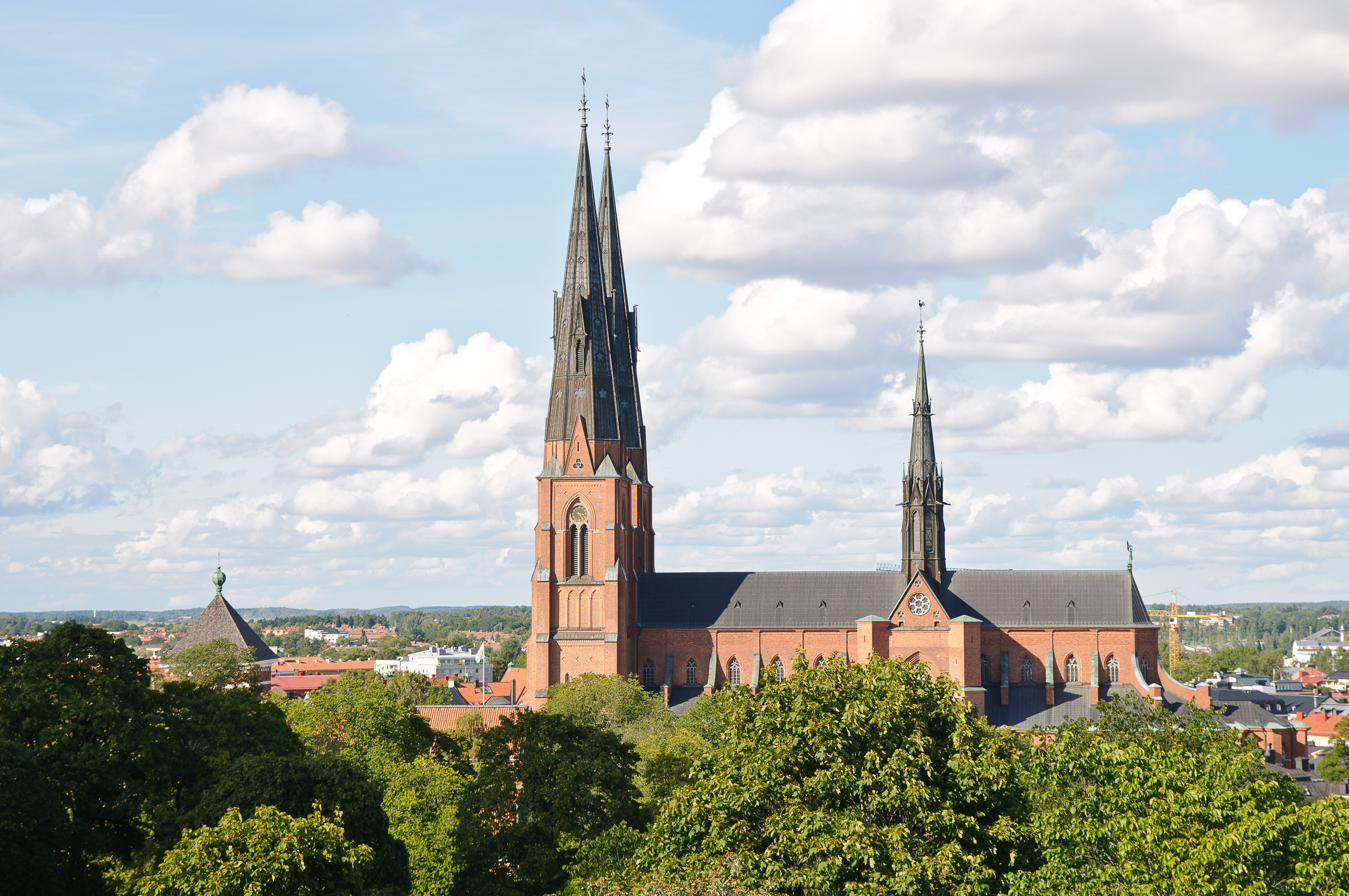
The Uppsala Cathedral, the headquarters of the Church of Sweden.

Lutheranism is the established church in most of the Nordic countries including Denmark, Norway, Sweden, Finland, and Iceland. In these countries, where most people are Lutheran, the churches are supported by taxes, either indirectly through the general taxes paid by most citizens or directly in the form of a church tax.

In Denmark, Finland, Iceland, and Sweden, citizens who are members of organized religious societies contribute this church tax to their respective religious societies. However, in Norway there is no direct church tax of any kind and the state church is supported over through the national budget. As of May 21, 2012, the Church of Norway is no longer a state church. However, the Church of Norway is not a separate legal entity from the government and is instead regulated by a special church law unlike other religions. The Norwegian king is required to be a member of the Church of Norway.

The typical church tax, an income tax of about 1 to 2%, is collected only from the members of the church or other religious society, but the church also gets its share from other taxes such as the municipal corporation tax in some regions. Priests are educated at the Faculties of Theology of the state universities or private colleges.

Many major seaports contain the outposts of the respective Nordic Lutheran churches (e.g. the Norwegian Sjømannskirken, the Church of Sweden Abroad and Finnish Seamen's Mission) to provide aid, social opportunities, and pastoral care for expatriate pensioners, tourists and visiting seamen in their own language. There are several Nordic churches in London and other cities internationally.

=== Other parts of Europe ===
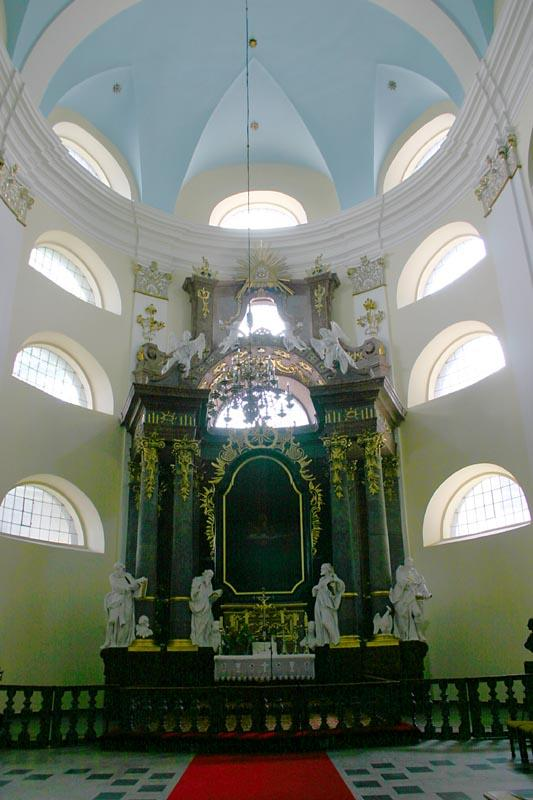
Jesus Church (Cieszyn), an important Lutheran church in Poland

Lutheranism is also prominent in the Netherlands, Estonia and Latvia.

There are smaller Lutheran denominations in other parts of Europe. Examples include the Evangelical Lutheran Church of England (ELCE) and the Evangelical Lutheran Church—Synod of France and Belgium (ELC-SFB), both of which are International Lutheran Council (ILC) members. The Protestant Church of Augsburg Confession of Alsace and Lorraine, Evangelical-Lutheran Church in Hungary, the Lutheran Church in Ireland, the Evangelical Lutheran Church in Italy, the Evangelical Church of Augsburg Confession in Poland, the Evangelical Church of the Augsburg Confession in Slovakia, the Evangelical Church of the Augsburg Confession in Slovenia, the Evangelical Church of the Augsburg Confession in Romania, the Evangelical Lutheran Church in Russia and Other States, and the Silesian Evangelical Church of the Augsburg Confession in the Czech Republic are, among others, members of the Lutheran World Federation.

=== United and uniting churches ===
Other Lutheran church bodies in Europe, affiliated with the Lutheran World Federation (LWF), have been merging with other Protestant churches in Europe. On 25 May 2007, the Evangelical Lutheran Church of France (EELF) and the Reformed Church of France (ERF) agreed to start discussions that will lead to the creation of a United Protestant Church of France by 2013. Another example is the Lutheran Church in the Kingdom of the Netherlands and its merger with two Reformed churches, creating the Protestant Church of the Netherlands (PKN). The PKN is a member of both the World Alliance of Reformed Churches and the Lutheran World Federation.

In 1993, the Lutheran Churches of the Nordic and Baltic states entered into a full communion agreement with the Anglican Churches of Europe and the British Isles, to form the Porvoo Communion. The North American Lutheran and Anglican churches in full communion with each other are also in full communion with the Porvoo Communion. As Anglicans are in full communion with the Old Catholic Churches of the Utrecht Union, that Union began negotiations in 2005 with the Church of Sweden on entering into a full communion agreement with the Lutherans.

== North America ==
Minnesota and North Dakota (shown in orange) are the only states in which a plurality of the population is Lutheran.

New Sweden, a Swedish colony in the Delaware Valley on the Mid-Atlantic coast, produced the first establishment of the Lutheran Church within America. Reorus Torkillus, the first Lutheran clergyman in North America, arrived in New Sweden on April 17, 1640. The roots of organized Lutheranism in North America extend back to the formation of the Pennsylvania Ministerium, the first Lutheran synod in North America, founded in 1742 by Henry Muhlenberg.

The Lutheran World Federation includes the Evangelical Lutheran Church in America (ELCA) and the Evangelical Lutheran Church in Canada (ELCIC). The ELCA is in full communion with the Episcopal Church, the Moravian Church in America, the Presbyterian Church (USA), the Reformed Church in America, the United Church of Christ, and the United Methodist Church. The ELCIC is in full communion with the Anglican Church of Canada.

The International Lutheran Council includes the Lutheran Church – Missouri Synod (LCMS), the Lutheran Church – Canada (LCC), the American Association of Lutheran Churches (AALC), and the Lutheran Ministerium and Synod – USA (LMS).

The Confessional Evangelical Lutheran Conference (CELC) includes the Wisconsin Evangelical Lutheran Synod (WELS) and the Evangelical Lutheran Synod (ELS).

The national church bodies serve their member congregations and other entities with colleges and seminaries for their professional church workers and missionaries, resources for starting new missions, ecclesiastical supervision, and liturgical and educational materials produced by their official publishing houses such as Augsburg-Fortress Press (ELCA), Concordia Publishing House (LCMS), and Northwestern Publishing House (WELS).

There are at least 20 smaller Lutheran denominations in North America, with some of them being doctrinal offshoots of larger groups through the years, or groups that never merged.

== Oceania ==
According to the most recent national census, approximately 0.7% of the Australian population call themselves Lutherans. Most Lutherans in Australia are members of congregations that form the Lutheran Church of Australia (LCA). At present the Lutheran Church of Australia has elected only to be an associate member of the two large worldwide Lutheran fellowships, the LWF and ILC.

More conservative groups of Australian Lutherans exist as the Evangelical Lutheran Congregations of the Reformation (ELCR) and the Australian Evangelical Lutheran Church.

Most Lutherans in Australia live in rural areas, although this is changing. The very earliest Lutherans came to Australia under August Kavel in 1839, as a result of the Prussian Union. Later immigrants show much more diversity, which resulted in many splits and the formation of many small Lutheran synods throughout Australia. Lutherans are most prominent in South Australia, Queensland and Victoria. After many years of discussion in 1966 the two main synods and therefore most Lutheran congregations joined to form the Lutheran Church of Australia.

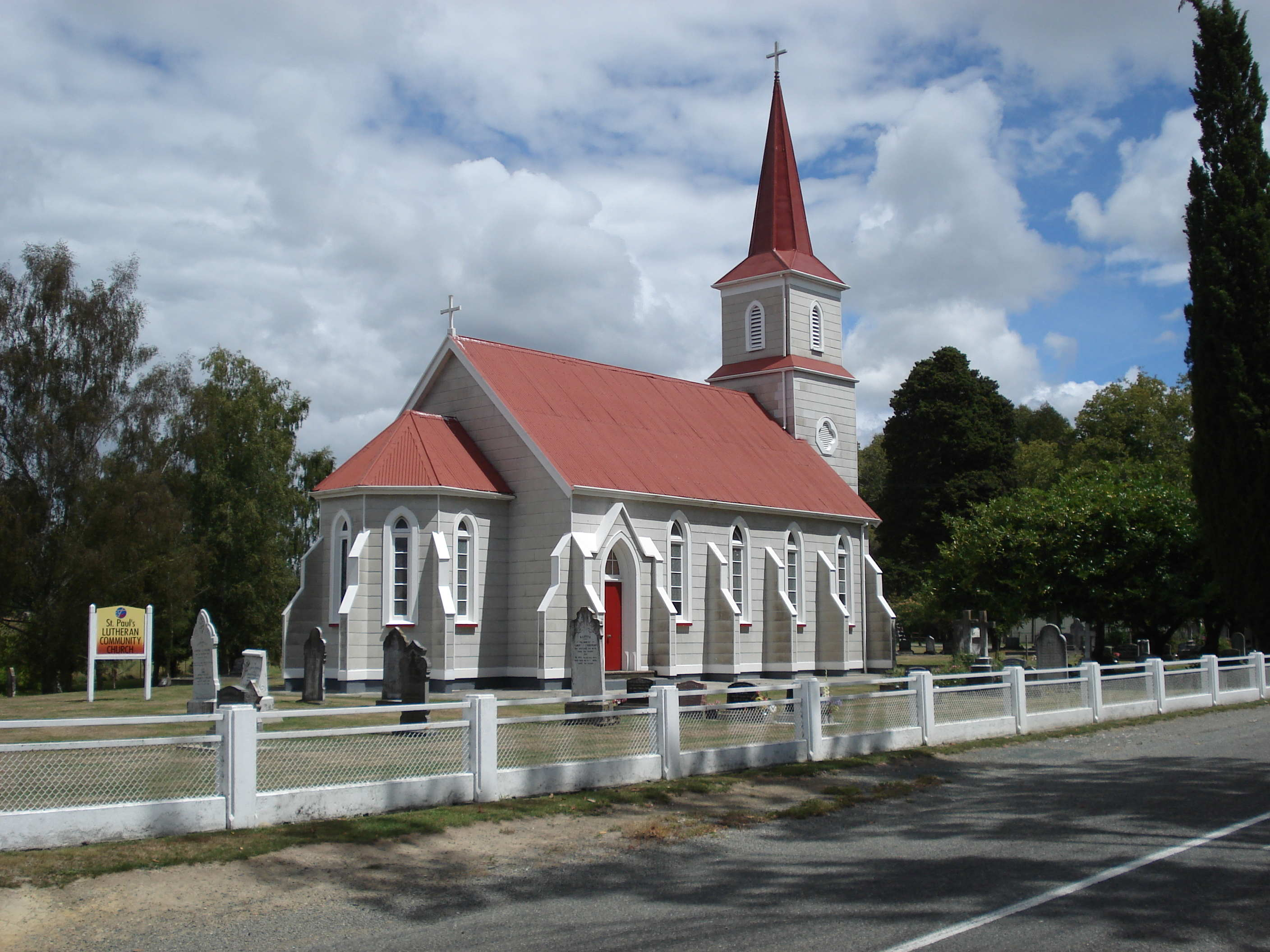
St Paul's Lutheran Church, Upper Moutere, New Zealand

The Lutheran Church has been in New Zealand since the Upper Moutere area, near Nelson, was settled mainly by Lutheran migrants from Germany, from about 1843. Lutheran missionaries accompanied them, sponsored by the North German Mission Society. Pastor Johann Wohlers soon left to work among Māori on Ruapuke Island, near Stewart Island. Pastor Johann Riemenschneider moved to Taranaki and set up the first North Island Lutheran mission. Pastor Johannes Heine remained in Nelson, where 4% of the population was Lutheran in 1861. Lutherans also arrived from Scandinavia in the 1870s and settled in the Manawatu, and in northern Wairarapa and southern Hawke’s Bay. By 1900 New Zealand Lutherans numbered 450. During the First World War membership of the Lutheran Church dropped because use of the German language was banned and many German migrants were interned. St Paul's Church in Christchurch was confiscated, and in 1918 its bells were melted for scrap metal. St John's Church in Halcombe, Manawatu, was burned down. Church numbers rose again after the Second World War with an influx of European migrants. In 2018 there were about 3,600 New Zealand Lutherans, 0.08% of the New Zealand population.

Papua New Guinea also has a sizeable Lutheran community. According to recent census information, Lutherans form about 16% of the country's population.

== South America ==
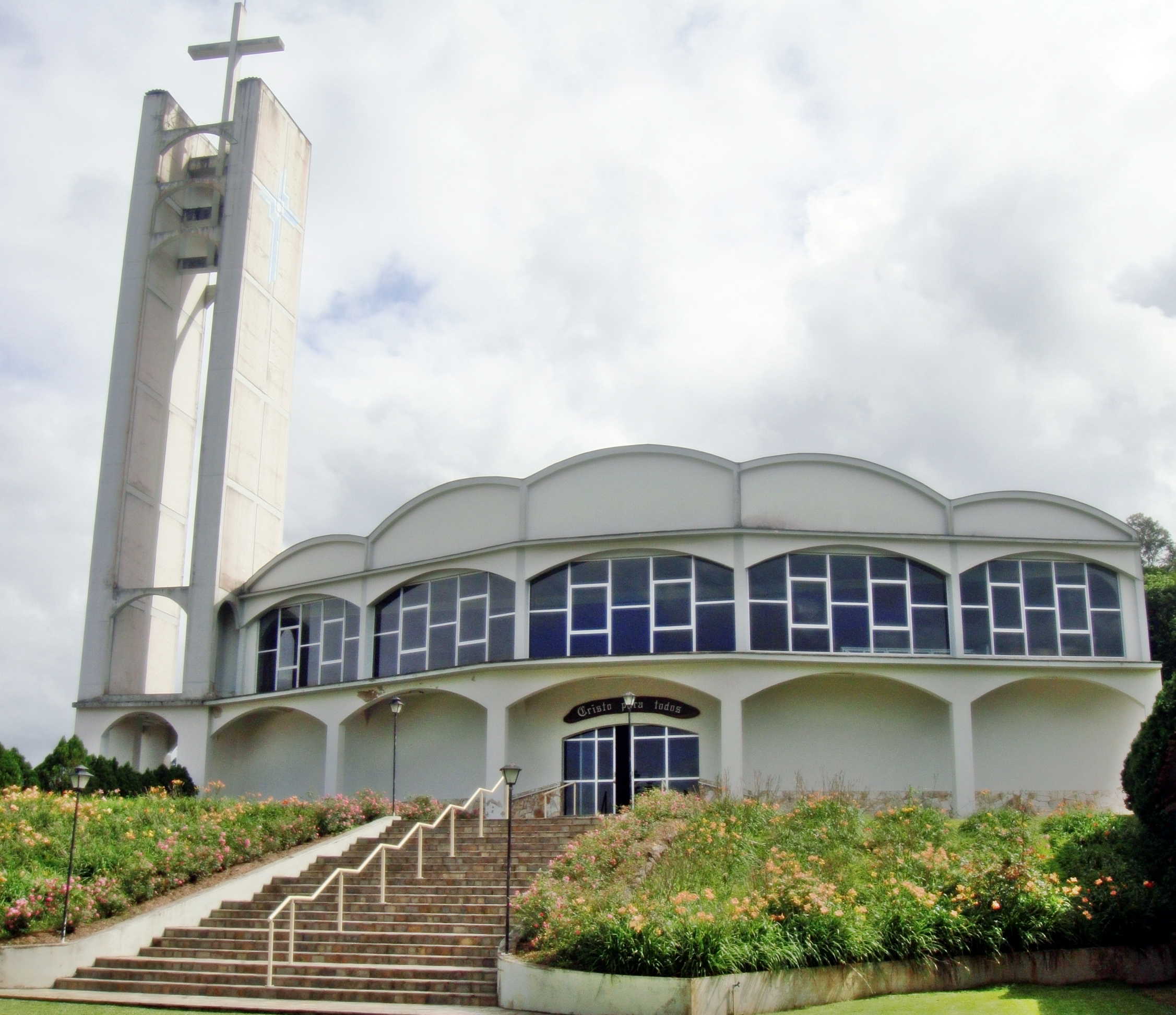
Lutheran church in Schroeder, Santa Catarina, Brazil

There is a sizeable Lutheran community in Brazil, especially in the southern states of Rio Grande do Sul and Santa Catarina. The community is the second largest in the Americas and the largest in Latin America. Almost 85% of all Lutherans in Latin America and the Caribbean live in Brazil. The religion was brought by German immigrants in the 18th and 19th centuries. The population of most cities founded by Germans, such as Novo Hamburgo, São Leopoldo, Joinville and Blumenau, include both Lutherans and Catholics.

In Argentina, Lutheranism is represented by the Danish, Swedish and Norwegian churches, which are located in Buenos Aires, next to the port area, where they were established mainly to serve the needs of the seamen who arrived to the city. A small Danish community, with their own Lutheran church and school, lives in the city of Tres Arroyos, about 400 km South from Buenos Aires. The conservative Evangelical Lutheran Church of Argentina (IELA) was founded primarily among Volga German immigrants in the province of Entre Rios in 1905 and has spread to other parts of the country.

== Statistics ==
The following statistics are for the Lutheran World Federation, which includes most of the Lutheran denominations in the world. The membership of the International Lutheran Council and the Confessional Evangelical Lutheran Conference are concentrated in the United States, with approximately 2.4 million and 400,000 members, respectively.

=== By continent ===
| Continent | Lutherans |
|---|---|
| Africa | 30,753,298 |
| Europe | 30,197,966 |
| Asia | 13,994,842 |
| North America | 5,318,279 |
| South America & the Caribbean | 776,230 |
| Total | 78,667,193 |

=== Countries with more than 1 million Lutherans ===
| Country | Lutherans |
|---|---|
| Ethiopia | 12,000,000 |
| Germany | 10,002,632 |
| Tanzania | 8,500,000 |
| Indonesia | 7,771,178 |
| Sweden | 5,484,000 |
| United States | 5,318,279 |
| Denmark | 4,253,575 |
| Madagascar | 4,000,000 |
| India | 3,984,104 |
| Norway | 3,633,021 |
| Finland | 3,579,616 |
| Nigeria | 2,265,000 |
| Papua New Guinea | 1,649,869 |
| Netherlands | 1,425,000 |
| Namibia | 1,277,722 |

== See also ==
- List of Lutheran denominations
- Protestants by country
