= Benjamin Rabenorolahy =

Malagasy politician and pastor (1940–2020)

Benjamin Rabenorolahy (born 21 January 1940 in Morombe – 14 July 2020 in Ambohibao (commune: Ambohidrabiby)) was a Malagasy politician and pastor & son of pastor Ramalahy. He was the president of the Malagasy Lutheran Church (FLM - Fiangonana Loterana Malagasy) for 16 years before 2004.

He was a member of the Senate of Madagascar for the Northwest Region, and did not represent any party.

He died on 14 July 2020, in Antananarivo from renal failure.
