= Päivi Räsänen =

Finnish politician (born 1959)

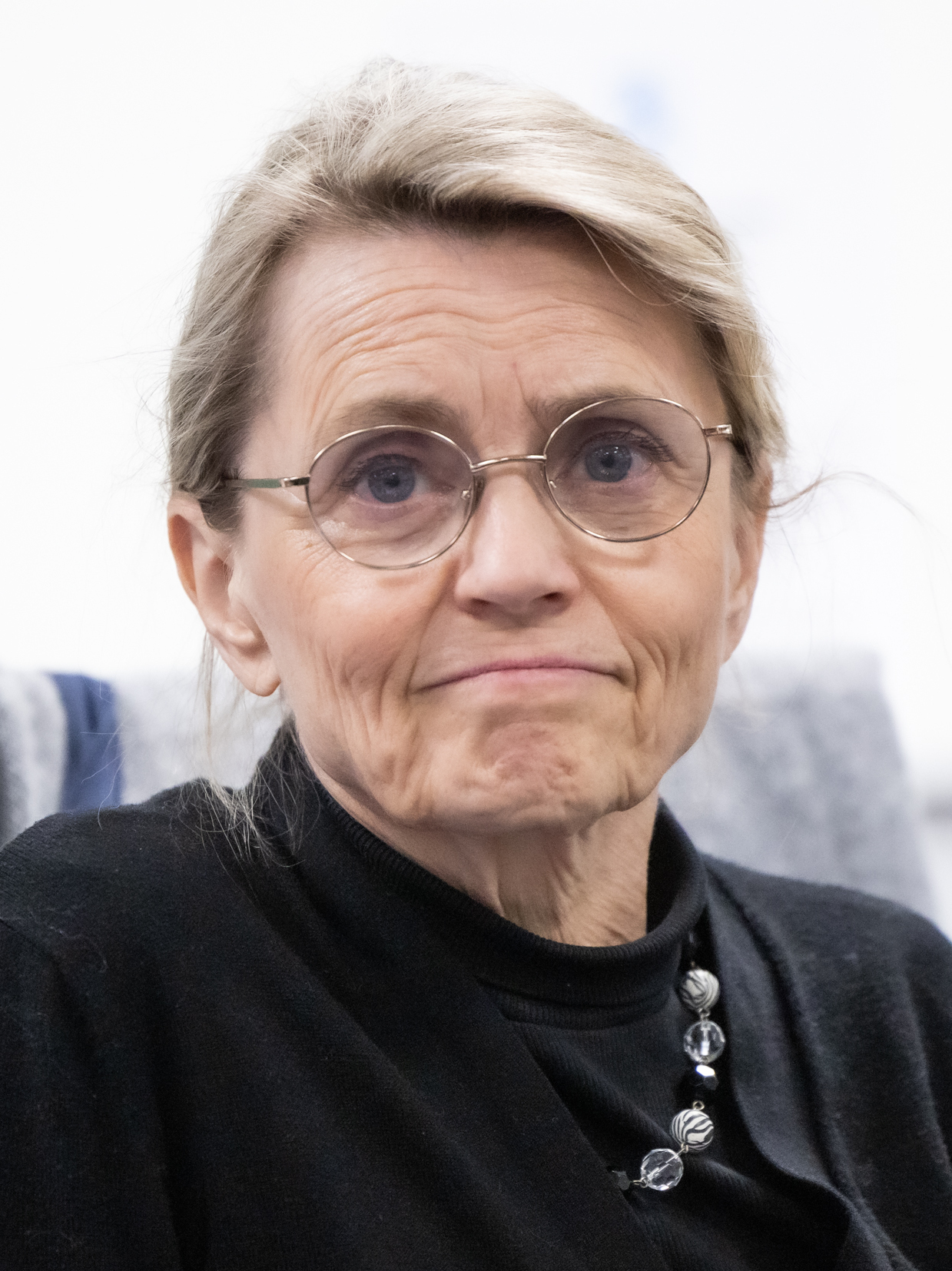
- Räsänen in 2023

Minister of the Interior
- In office 22 June 2011 – 29 May 2015
- Prime Minister: Jyrki Katainen; Alexander Stubb
- Preceded by: Anne Holmlund
- Succeeded by: Petteri Orpo

Member of the Finnish Parliament
- Incumbent
- Assumed office 24 March 1995

Leader of the Finnish Christian Democrats
- In office 2 October 2004 – 28 August 2015
- Preceded by: Bjarne Kallis
- Succeeded by: Sari Essayah

Personal details
- Born: Päivi Maria Kuvaja; 19 December 1959 (age 66) Sonkajärvi, North Savo, Finland
- Party: Christian Democrats
- Children: 5
- Occupation: Physician
- Profession: Licentiate in Medicine
- Website: www.paivirasanen.fi

Päivi Maria Räsänen, née Kuvaja (born 19 December 1959), is a Finnish politician and physician. She was the chairwoman of the Christian Democrats from 2004 to 2015, and the Minister of the Interior of Finland between 2011 and 2015.

A physician by education, Räsänen entered politics in the early 1990s. She has been in the Riihimäki City Council since 1993, and in the Finnish Parliament since 1995. Following the 2011 parliamentary elections, Räsänen served as the Minister of the Interior until 2015, holding the position in both the Katainen and Stubb cabinets.

In 2021, Räsänen was charged with incitement against a minority group for several statements alleged to be discriminatory toward homosexuals. After being unanimously acquitted of all charges by both the Helsinki District Court (2022) and the Helsinki Court of Appeal (2023), she was convicted on one of the charges by the Supreme Court of Finland in March 2026.

== Early life and career as a physician ==
Päivi Maria Kuvaja was born in Sonkajärvi, North Savo on 19 December 1959. She spent her childhood and youth in Konnunsuo, Joutseno, in South Karelia. She graduated from Joutseno High School in 1978, achieving six laudatur grades (the highest possible grade) on her matriculation exams.

In 1984, Räsänen graduated as a Licentiate of Medicine from the University of Helsinki. She worked as a physician in the internal medicine department of Riihimäki Regional Hospital from 1985 to 1988, as a private practitioner from 1988 to 1992, and as a state occupational health physician from 1992 to 1995. Her interest in societal advocacy was initially sparked by medical ethics and her opposition to abortion. Räsänen served on the board of the Finnish Christian Medical Association from 1988 to 1994.

== Political career ==
Räsänen entered politics in the 1990s with a focus on family policy. She first ran for the Parliament of Finland in the 1991 elections but was not elected. In the 1992 municipal elections, she was elected to the Riihimäki City Council, running as an independent candidate on the ticket of the Finnish Christian League (renamed Christian Democrats in 2001).

In the 1995 parliamentary elections, Räsänen was elected to the parliament from the Häme constituency with 5 976 votes. In 2003, Räsänen was elected vice chair of her parliamentary group. She was elected the chair of the Christian Democrats on 2 October 2004.

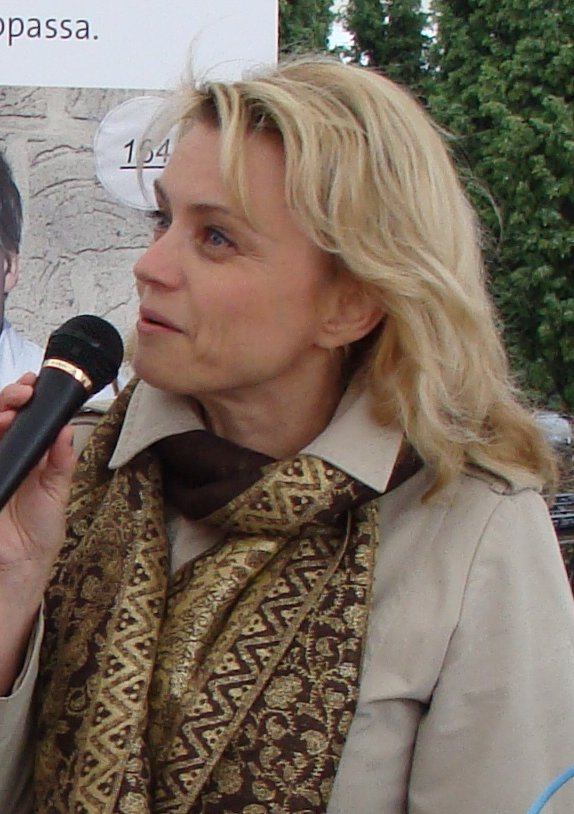
Räsänen in 2009

Following the government formation after the 2011 election, which led to the Christian Democrats joining the government, Räsänen was nominated by the party as the Minister of the Interior in the 72nd Finnish Cabinet led by Jyrki Katainen, and she was inaugurated along with the government on 22 June 2011. When Alexander Stubb succeeded Jyrki Katainen as Prime Minister in June 2014, Räsänen continued in the same role, serving in the Stubb Cabinet until the 2015 elections.

Following the Christian Democrats' defeat in the 2015 parliamentary elections and their subsequent move to the opposition, Räsänen stepped down as party chair.

== Political positions ==
Räsänen belongs to the so-called conservative wing of the Christian Democrats. She opposes abortion, same-sex marriage, and the ordination of women, and supports the view that the man is the head of the family.

On 12 October 2010, Räsänen was one of the participants on a live TV debate on Ajankohtainen kakkonen's Homoilta special, with the topic of same-sex marriage and LGBT rights. As a protest, nearly 40,000 members left the state Evangelical Lutheran Church through the website eroakirkosta.fi over the next several weeks. At the time, this was the largest of such protests. Räsänen was on the show representing her party and herself as a Christian individual along with five other proponents of heterosexual rather than homosexual marriage. The church membership resignations were attributed by the media as a protest against her and then-Minister of Culture and Sports Stefan Wallin. Räsänen thinks homosexual acts are a sin and she herself does not consider her views "specifically extreme".

When interviewed by Ylioppilaslehti on 29 October 2010, Räsänen said that she would favor Christians over Muslims when selecting asylum seekers to Finland due, in her opinion, to Muslims' "difficulties to adjust to the Finnish culture". Her comments were condemned as "incomprehensible and merciless" by then-Minister of Migration and European Affairs Astrid Thors and then-Minister of Culture and Sports Stefan Wallin. Räsänen responded to the criticism, saying her comments were misinterpreted, since she did not consider religion as the main criterion for asylum seekers' admissions, but instead she wanted to highlight the benefits of refugees' integration through religious connections. In practice, as minister in charge of immigration affairs Räsänen advocated for increasing the number of refugees taken in by Finland, especially from Syria.

In September 2012, Räsänen appointed a religiously conservative applicant, considered less qualified by the media, among six candidates to Permanent Secretary in the Ministry of Interior Affairs, which created considerable debate, especially as she had previously condemned political appointments of government officials. In a speech in July 2013 Räsänen contrasted abortion law to animal protection law saying that the latter gives better protection for animals than the former does to human unborn children. About 6,500 abortion supporters formally renounced their state church membership in the first six days following the controversy.

== Trial ==
=== Pre-trial investigations ===
In Autumn 2019, the Finnish police started a pre-trial investigation on Räsänen for incitement against a minority group after she criticised the Evangelical Lutheran Church of Finland's official participation in LGBTQ Pride events. In November the same year, a second investigation was initiated regarding a 2004 booklet written by Räsänen and published by the Luther Foundation Finland. Titled "Male and Female He Created Them – Homosexual Relationships Challenge the Christian Concept of Humanity," the 24-page pamphlet presents an argument against same-sex relationships. A third investigation was opened regarding Räsänen's statements on a Yle Puhe radio interview in December 2019. The episode was titled "What did Jesus think about homosexuals?".

In April 2021, Finnish Prosecutor General Raija Toiviainen announced that three separate charges were being filed against Räsänen: for statements made in the 2004 booklet, writings on the websites of the Luther Foundation Finland and the Evangelical Lutheran Mission Diocese of Finland, and statements on Twitter, Instagram, Facebook and on the Yle Puhe radio interview. Each charge carried a maximum penalty of up to two years in prison.

The case gained international attention, and Räsänen began receiving legal support from ADF International, a conservative Christian legal advocacy organization. The International Lutheran Council published a petition of 45 conservative Lutheran church bodies, calling on the Finnish government to refrain from prosecuting her. She was likewise supported by the European Evangelical Alliance and the Spanish Evangelical Alliance. Five senators from the United States (Marco Rubio, James Lankford, Josh Hawley, Mike Braun and James Inhofe) warned the United States Ambassador-at-Large for International Religious Freedom that the decision to prosecute them risked creating a "secular blasphemy law" to prosecute Christians, Muslims, and Jews. Ten academics from the United States signed an open letter to the United States Commission on International Religious Freedom stating that the "prosecutions are straightforward acts of oppression".

=== District Court and the Court of Appeal ===
The first part of her trial was held in Helsinki District Court on 24 January 2022 and the second part of her trial was held on 14 February. The statements and testimonies of both the first and second parts of the trial and also the court's decision were live-blogged in English by Christian Network Europe. Evangelical Lutheran Mission Diocese of Finland bishop Juhana Pohjola was tried along with Räsänen as the publisher of the 2004 booklet. At the start of the proceedings, the prosecution asked for a day-fine of at least 120 days for Räsänen, 60 days for Pohjola, and a community fine of at least 10,000 euros for the Luther Foundation. An additional demand from the prosecution was for the Luther Foundation to remove the text of Räsänen's pamphlet from the internet and for the Finnish public broadcasting company Yle to remove certain passages from the radio interview.

The District Court found her and Pohjola not guilty of all charges and ordered the prosecution to pay their legal costs on 30 March 2022. While the court assessed that some of Räsänen's statements and writings were offensive to homosexuals, it ruled that they did not constitute hate speech. In response to the ruling, the prosecutor Anu Mantila stated that the District Court "interpreted the statements differently than the prosecution and [...] the elements that infringed on equality and the prohibition of discrimination weren't taken into consideration accordingly." The prosecutor's office appealed the verdict on 29 April 2022.

In November 2023, the Helsinki Court of Appeal upheld the district court's verdict, finding Räsänen and Pohjola not guilty on all charges. Prosecutors were subsequently granted permission to appeal to the Supreme Court regarding the 2019 Twitter post and the 2004 booklet. The acquittal regarding the radio interview was not appealed and remained final.

=== Supreme Court ruling ===
On 26 March 2026, the Supreme Court of Finland convicted Päivi Räsänen and Juhana Pohjola of hate speech against gay people. The court ordered her to pay a fine of 1,800 euros.

The verdict was based on Räsänen's 2004 booklet, in which she described homosexuality as a "sexual deviation" and an "aberration of psychosexual development". The Supreme Court found these characterizations derogatory towards homosexuals and a violation of the law. The court ruled that the offensive passages were not protected by religious freedom, as they did not constitute a profession of faith or a reflection of sacred texts; instead, they were primarily expressions of the author's own social and medical opinions. A decisive factor in the ruling was that Räsänen wrote these statements in her capacity as both an MP and a medical expert, and these roles were highlighted in the booklet. The decision in the Supreme Court was reached by a narrow 3–2 vote, in which two of the judges would have cleared Räsänen and Pohjola of all charges.

Conversely, Räsänen was acquitted of a separate charge regarding a 2019 tweet. In that post, she questioned the Evangelical Lutheran Church's official partnership with Pride, asking how the church's biblical foundation aligned with turning "shame and sin" into a source of pride. She included Bible verses in the tweet. The Court ruled that in this context these actions did not meet the legal threshold for insulting a minority group under the definition of incitement.

After the verdict Räsänen said, "it's evident that European 'hate speech' laws are incompatible with free societies". In May 2026, Räsänen confirmed that she intends to lodge an application against the Finnish state at the European Court of Human Rights over the ruling.

In July 2026, the UK Home Office refused to grant Räsänen an Electronic Travel Authorisation. Räsänen assumed that the reason behind the refusal was her recent criminal conviction.

== Personal life ==
Räsänen belongs to the Finnish Lutheran Mission (Kansanlähetys), a Christian revival movement. Her husband, Niilo Räsänen, is the principal of the Finnish Lutheran Mission College. They have five children and twelve grandchildren. She lives in Riihimäki.

== See also ==
- Dariusz Oko
- Johannes Stöhr

Political offices
Preceded by Anne Holmlund	Minister of the Interior of Finland; 22 June 2011 —25 May 2015	Succeeded by Petteri Orpo
Party political offices
Preceded by Bjarne Kallis	Chairperson the Finnish Christian Democrats; 2 October 2004 —28 August 2015	Succeeded by Sari Essayah
