= Evangelical Lutheran Church – Synod of France and Belgium =

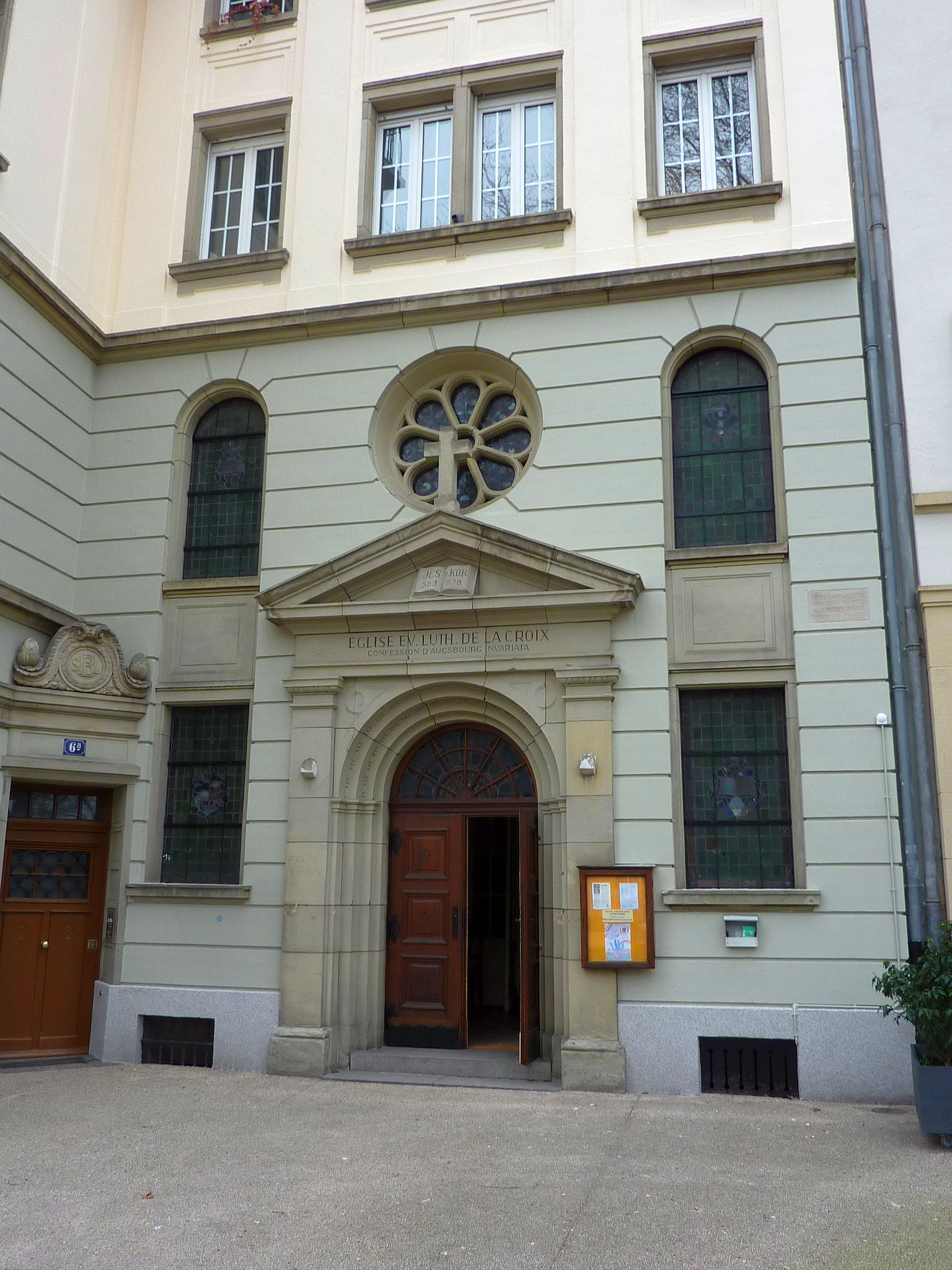
Lutheran Holy Cross church in Strasbourg, France

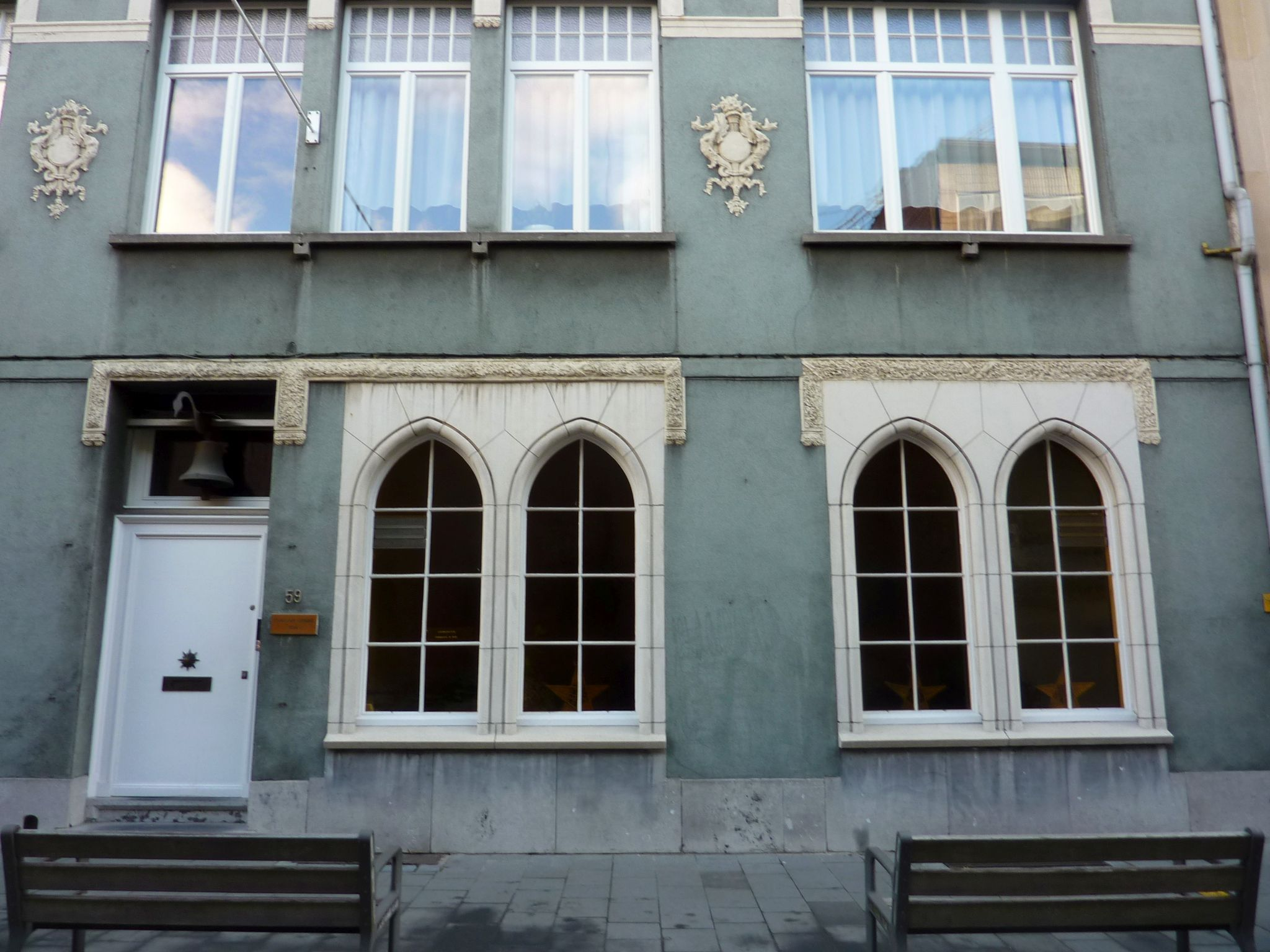
Lutheran church in Antwerp, Belgium

For logistical reasons in 2008, the Evangelical Lutheran Church - Synod of France and Belgium divided into two separate synods: the Evangelical Lutheran Church - Synod of France, (French: Église Évangélique Luthérienne Synode de France, or EEL-SF) and the Evangelical Lutheran Church in Belgium, (Evangelisch-Lutherse Kerk in België, or ELKB). Both are confessional Lutheran church bodies in France and in Belgium respectively. Over a dozen parishes belong to the two synods.

Both the EEL-SF and ELKB are members of the European Lutheran Conference. They are also members of the International Lutheran Council, of which the Lutheran Church–Missouri Synod of North America is also a member.

== History ==
The EEL-SFB formed in 1927 by congregations founded during the 19th century when people left the Protestant Church of Augsburg Confession of Alsace and Lorraine for doctrinal reasons. Outreach started before and after World War 2. The Synod supports francophone churches in Central Africa and is involved in leadership training in West Africa. It currently has 957 baptized members in France.

For logistical reasons in 2008, the Evangelical Lutheran Church - Synod of France and Belgium divided into two separate synods: the Evangelical Lutheran Church - Synod of France, (French: Église Évangélique Luthérienne Synode de France, or EEL-SF) and the Evangelical Lutheran Church in Belgium, or Evangelisch-Lutherse Kerk in België (ELKB).

== Associations ==
The EEL-SFB is associated with the media outreach "L'Heure Luthérienne" (site: www.mediachrist.com), a spinoff from Lutheran Hour Ministries.

The EEL-SFB established a congregation in Burgdorf, Switzerland near Bern in 2010. In November 2014, the EEL-SFB officially established altar and pulpit fellowship with the Lutherische Bekenntniskirche in der Schweiz (LBKS) also known as Eglise Luthérienne Libre en Suisse or Iglesia Confesional Luterana en Suiza. Bahnhofstrasse 12, Burgdorf, Switzerland. On August 28, 2017, the EEL-SFB participated in the start of an LBKS mission at Mettmenstetten near Zürich.

The ELKB partners with the "Eglise Luthérienne Malgache" (Lutheran Church of Madagascar). Services are mostly in Malagasy with parts in French.

== EEL-SFB Presidents ==
- 2004–2008 Jean Thiéaut Haessig

After 2008, see EEL-SF or ELKB

== ELKB Presidents ==
Gijsbertus van Hattem is the current president of the ELKB.

- ???–present Gijsbertus van Hattem

== EEL-SF Presidents ==
Gleisson R. Schmidt is the current president of the EEL-SF.

- 2008–2012 François Poillet
- 2012–2016 Roger Jones
- 2016–2020 Martin Jautzy
- 2020-present Gleisson R. Schmidt

== List of ELKB Congregations ==
Brussels. Pr. Johannes Reitze-Landau. Ave. Salomélaan 7, 1150 Woluwe-Saint Pierre. http://www.alcb.be

Antwerp. Pr Gijsbertus van Hattem. Tabakvest 59, 2000. http://users.skynet.be/lutherse.kerk

== List of EEL-SF Congregations ==
Heiligenstein. Bas-Rhin. Pr Volff. 28 rue Principale. heiligenstein@eglise-lutherienne.org

Lembach. Bas-Rhin. Pr Heintz. 6 rue du Maire Dielmann. lembach@eglise-lutherienne.org

Mulhouse. Eglise Luthérienne du Christ. Pr Poillet. 21 chemin des Ardennes. mulhouse@eglise-lutherienne.org website

La Petite Pierre. Bas-Rhin. Pr Jautzy. 39 rue Kirchberg (maison de Retraite). kirchberg@libertysurf.fr

Schillersdorf. Bas-Rhin. Pr Jautzy. 16 rue Principale. schillersdorf@eglise-lutherienne.org

Strasbourg. Eglise Luthérienne de la Croix. Pr Volff. 6A place d'Austerlitz. strasbourg@eglise-lutherienne.org website

Woerth. Bas-Rhin Pr Heintz. 12 rue de Hagenau. woerth@eglise-lutherienne.org

Paris. St Sauveur. Pr Schmidt. 105 rue de l'Abbé Groult. 75015. paris@eglise-lutherienne.org St Sauveur website

Paris (Chatenay Malabry). Eglise Luthérienne Saint-Pierre. Pr Lara. 9 rue Jules Barbier. chatenay@eglise-lutherienne.org St Pierre website

Paris (Saint Maur des Fossés). Eglise Luthérienne Saint Jean. Pr Aoustin. 109 avenue Beaurepaire. saint-maur@eglise-lutherienne.org St Jean website

Poitou-Charentes. Mission.

Troyes. Mission.
