= Evangelical Lutheran Church of Argentina =

- Iglesia Evangélica Luterana Argentina
- Abbreviation: IELA
- Classification: Protestant
- Orientation: Lutheran
- Theology: Confessional Lutheran
- President: Rev. Arturo Truenow
- Region: Argentina
- Headquarters: Buenos Aires, Argentina
- Origin: 1986
- Branched from: Lutheran Church–Missouri Synod
- Congregations: 231
- Members: 27,890 baptized 20,631 confirmed
- Ministers: 73
- Official website: iela.org.ar

The Evangelical Lutheran Church of Argentina (Spanish: Iglesia Evangélica Luterana Argentina, IELA) is a conservative, confessional Lutheran synod that holds to the Book of Concord. It has about 27.890 members. The IELA is a member of the International Lutheran Council.

== History ==
The IELA had its beginnings in November 1905 in Aldea San Juan, Entre Ríos Province in northeastern Argentina, when missionaries from the Lutheran Church–Missouri Synod (LCMS) began mission work among the Russian-German immigrants there. In the 1920s, additional work was undertaken in Chaco Province among Russian-German immigrants from the Volga region of Russia.

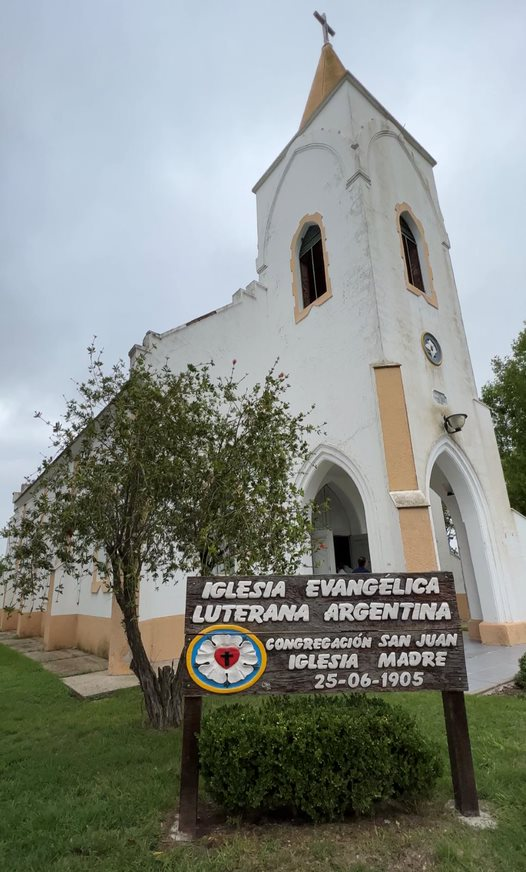
Congregación San Juan is the mother church of the IELA

The work in Argentina was originally part of the Brazilian District of the LCMS, which later became the independent Evangelical Lutheran Church of Brazil. The congregations in Argentina, Uruguay, Paraguay, and Chile were placed in a new Argentine District in 1926/1927. The IELA became an independent church body in 1986.

== Educational institutions ==
Seminary training was conducted at Porto Alegre, Brazil, until 1942, when what is now known as Seminario Concordia was established in Villa Ballester. The seminary moved to the José León Suárez suburb of Buenos Aires in 1948. Pre-seminary training was originally given at Colegio Concordia, which was established in 1926 in Crespo, Entre Ríos. That training was incorporated into the Seminario Concordia in 1950. A preparatory school named Colegio Concordia was opened in 1956 at Obera, Misiones.
