= Lutheran Church in Korea =

- Logo of the LCK
- Classification: Protestant
- Orientation: Lutheran
- Polity: Interdependent local, and national expressions with modified episcopal polity
- Leader: Rev. Dr. Kim Eun-Seob
- Associations: LWF, ILC, ALC, NCCK
- Region: Republic of Korea
- Origin: 1971
- Branched from: Lutheran Church–Missouri Synod
- Congregations: 37
- Members: 2271
- Ministers: 42
- Tertiary institutions: 1
- Other name: Gidokgyo Hanguk Ruteohoe
- Official website: http://info.lck.or.kr/wp/

The Lutheran Church in Korea or LCK (Korean: 기독교한국루터회) is a confessional Lutheran denomination in the Republic of Korea and the only Lutheran denomination in South Korea. Unusual for a confessional Lutheran church, the LCK is not just a member of the confessional International Lutheran Council but also the mainline Lutheran World Federation.

The LCK has 2,271 baptized members, 5,210 communicant members, 37 congregations, 42 active pastors and a seminary. The current president of the LCK is the Rev. Dr. Chul-Hwan Kim, first elected in 2013.

== History ==
=== Early history ===
Early Lutheran mission work in Korea can be traced to the initial effort by the German missionary, Karl Friedrich August Gützlaff, who also worked for the East India Company as a translator. Gützlaff arrived 1832 in Wonsan Island off the west coast of Korea as part of a fact finding mission and good will tour of the different countries of the Far East to collect information about the reactions in official circles, the business community and the population at large to the petition requesting opening the harbors and initiating free-trade and missionary activity. Sent by the Netherlands Missionary Society, Gützlaff visited the western provinces of Hwanghae and Chungcheong (today located within North Korea and South Korea respectively), sending gifts and a petition to the Korean king requesting an opening for trade and mission work.

While waiting for a reply, he distributed Bibles and tracts in the regions he visited. The petition and gifts were returned with a hesitant attitude of the Korean government ending the initial failed effort by Gützlaff to start a mission work in Korea and forcing him to return to Macao. Lutherans would not start any sustained mission work in Korea until after the Second World War.

=== Lutheran mission and the establishment of a national church ===
Sustained Lutheran mission work in Korea began in 1958 with the arrival of three missionary families and a Korean national worker, Dr. Won-Yong Ji, sent by The Lutheran Church–Missouri Synod (LCMS). The Korea Lutheran Mission, as it was known then, used mass media techniques as an outreach tool and by 1971, was reorganised as a national church known as the Lutheran Church in Korea. Since then, the LCK has been a partner church of the LCMS.

== Beliefs and practices ==
The LCK is a member church of the International Lutheran Council and the Lutheran World Federation. As a church in the Lutheran tradition, it accepts the teachings found in the unaltered Augsburg Confession, Luther's Small Catechism and other confessional articles and symbols of the Book of Concord.

== Ministries & social services ==
The LCK operates the Luther University, which includes a seminary through one of its graduate programs, with an enrollment of approximately 600 students. In recent years, the LCK expanded the programs offered through Luther University which was fully accredited by the Ministry of Education of South Korea in 2006 and offers degrees in seven departments.

The Korea Lutheran Hour radio programme continues to broadcast weekly over six stations. The Korea Bethel Series correspondence course and seminars was started in 1974 and has been attended by more than 6,500 clergy and have enrolled more than 450,000 people throughout Korea.

Currently, the LCK is focusing on starting new congregations and gaining membership as well as reaching out to the Korean diaspora, particularly in China and the currently inaccessible North Korea.

The LCMS maintains the International Lutheran Church, a separate English language ministry in Seoul. It began as a military chaplaincy in 1962 and now serves a 150-member congregation that is 40% North American and 40% Korean. It more recently opened another congregation in Pyeongtaek.

== Affiliations ==
The LCK participates actively in ecumenical relationships through:

- National Council of Churches in Korea
- International Lutheran Council
- Lutheran World Federation
  - Asia Lutheran Communion

The LCK also works in partnership with:

- Lutheran Church–Missouri Synod
- Evangelical Lutheran Church in Bavaria

== See also ==
- Christianity in Korea
