= Juhana Pohjola =

Bishop of The Mission Diocese of Finland, Chairman of the International Lutheran Council

Juhana Markus Pohjola (born March 27, 1972, in Helsinki) is the second bishop of the Evangelical Lutheran Mission Diocese of Finland (abbreviated LHPK) and a former priest of the Evangelical Lutheran Church of Finland. The diocesan assembly of the Mission Diocese elected him to his position on January 23, 2021., and his ordination took place at the Summer Festival of the Mission Diocese in August. In 2022 Juhana Pohjola was elected as a chairman of The International Lutheran Council.

Since 2013, Pohjola has served as the diocesan dean of the Mission Diocese and before that as the dean of the Luther Foundation since 2000. Pohjola has completed Master of Theology studies at the University of Helsinki and Master of Sacred Theology studies at Concordia Theological Seminary in Fort Wayne, Indiana. In 2014, he received his doctorate in theology at the University of Helsinki. In his studies, Pohjola has studied, among other things, the church father Tertullian, Hermann Sasse's understanding of ecclesiastical connection, and the Finnish ordination formulas' understanding of priestly ordination and office. In 2022 bishop Pohjola was awarded Honorary Doctorate (Doctor of Divinity – Honoris Causa) by the Concordia Theological Seminary in Fort Wayne, Indiana.

Pohjola was ordained a priest in the diocese of Oulu of the Evangelical-Lutheran Church of Finland in 1999 and he was given an official order to serve The Luther Foundation Finland. However, he was later stripped of his rights as a priest in the Evangelical-Lutheran Church of Finland because the Luther Foundation was deemed to have separated from the Evangelical Lutheran Church of Finland into its own denomination. In the years 2000–2010, Pohjola served as the pastor of the St. Mark's Parish in Helsinki and as a dean of The Luther Foundation Finland and in 2011–2012 as a visiting researcher at the Concordia Lutheran Theological Seminary in St Catharine, Canada. Pohjola served as the dean of the Mission Diocese from 2013 to 2021.

== Personal life ==
Pohjola is married to Päivi Pohjola and is the father of four children.

Pohjola faced trial on charges of hate speech against gays and lesbians after he published a booklet written by Päivi Räsänen about homosexuality. Initially, the district court of Helsinki dismissed the charges against him in 2022. The Supreme Court of Finland convicted Räsänen and Pohjola on 26 March 2026.
