= Lutheran Ministerium and Synod – USA =

- Abbreviation: LMS-USA
- Classification: Lutheran
- Region: United States
- Origin: 1995; Indianapolis, Indiana
- Separated from: American Association of Lutheran Churches
- Official website: www.lmsusa.org

The Lutheran Ministerium and Synod – USA (LMS-USA) is a small Lutheran Christian denomination based in the United States. Its congregations are mostly located in the Upper Midwest, and the church body maintains its official headquarters in Indianapolis, Indiana.

Founded in 1995, the LMS-USA is governed by principles known as "free church". It has a congregationalist governance structure with no bishops or district presidents, and the national leadership has "the authority only to advise and recommend" to its member congregations.

The LMS-USA joined the International Lutheran Council (ILC) in 2012.

== History ==
The synod was born when its original member congregations split from the American Association of Lutheran Churches (AALC), a church that itself had broken with the American Lutheran Church (ALC) when that body participated in the 1988 merger that formed the Evangelical Lutheran Church in America (ELCA).

After splitting with the American Lutheran Church in 1987, the AALC originally sought to provide a home for former ALC parishioners and other Lutherans that would encompass orthodox, charismatic, and evangelical strains of Lutheranism. During the late 1980s and early 1990s, several ministers of the newly formed AALC became concerned over the increasing dominance of charismatic or Pentecostal strains of liturgy and theology within the church, particularly at the AALC's new seminary.

This handful of pastors submitted resolutions to the AALC's June 1994 convention that would remove references to the church's three-strand orientation (orthodox, charismatic, and evangelical), and that would remove from consideration a candidate for a seminary professorship that the pastors found objectionable. After their resolutions failed, three AALC congregations left that body and formed the LMS-USA at an April 1995 conference in Indianapolis. They left in order to uphold the inerrancy of Scripture and to not compromise their stance against the charismatic movement.

== Beliefs ==
The LMS-USA accepts the inerrancy of scripture and the Lutheran Confessions as found in the Book of Concord. Congregations have broad latitude in determining the standards for admission to Holy Communion. The LMS-USA describes itself as "moderate or middle-conservative" socially and theologically. According to church documents, the LMS-USA seeks to "fill the gap" in American Lutheranism between the more liberal ELCA and what it calls "the conservative to ultra-conservative" approach of the other Lutheran church bodies in the United States.

== Pastoral training ==
In fall 1999, the LMS-USA established St. Timothy Lutheran Seminary for the training of clergy in the denomination. The institution is primarily a "seminary without walls," registered in the State of Wisconsin. Students typically study at one of a number of non-LMS Lutheran or other seminaries, while receiving supervision from the LMS-USA seminary board and faculty and meeting regularly with a mentoring LMS-USA pastor. The LMS-USA also works with graduates of other seminaries, prospective pastors who wish to attend an accredited institution, or second- or third-career individuals considering the ministry in order to map out any additional training which may be required in doctrine or ministerial practice.
