= Lutheran Church of Australia =

Lutheran denomination in Australia and New Zealand

- Abbreviation: LCA, LCANZ
- Classification: Protestant
- Orientation: Confessional Lutheran
- Scripture: Holy Bible
- Theology: Lutheran
- Polity: Congregational; Episcopal
- Structure: Interdependent local and national expressions with modified congregational polity
- Bishop: Rev. Paul Smith
- Associations: NCCA; LWF (Note: Associate member.); ILC (Note: Former associate member.)
- Headquarters: North Adelaide, South Australia
- Origin: 1966; 60 years ago (Note: Although the church was founded in the 1960s, Lutherans came to Australia in the 1830s escaping persecution.)
- Merger of: Evangelical Lutheran Church; United Evangelical Lutheran Church
- Separations: Lutheran Mission - Australia
- Congregations: 600+
- Members: 145,868 (2021) (Note: Per 2021 census.)
- Ministers: 450+
- Aid organization: Australian Lutheran World Service
- Nursing homes: 44
- Publications: The Lutheran
- Official website: lca.org.au
- Slogan: “Where Love Comes To Life”

The Lutheran Church of Australia (LCA) is the major Lutheran denomination in Australia and New Zealand. It was created from a merger of the Evangelical Lutheran Church in Australia and the United Evangelical Lutheran Church of Australia in 1966.

== History ==
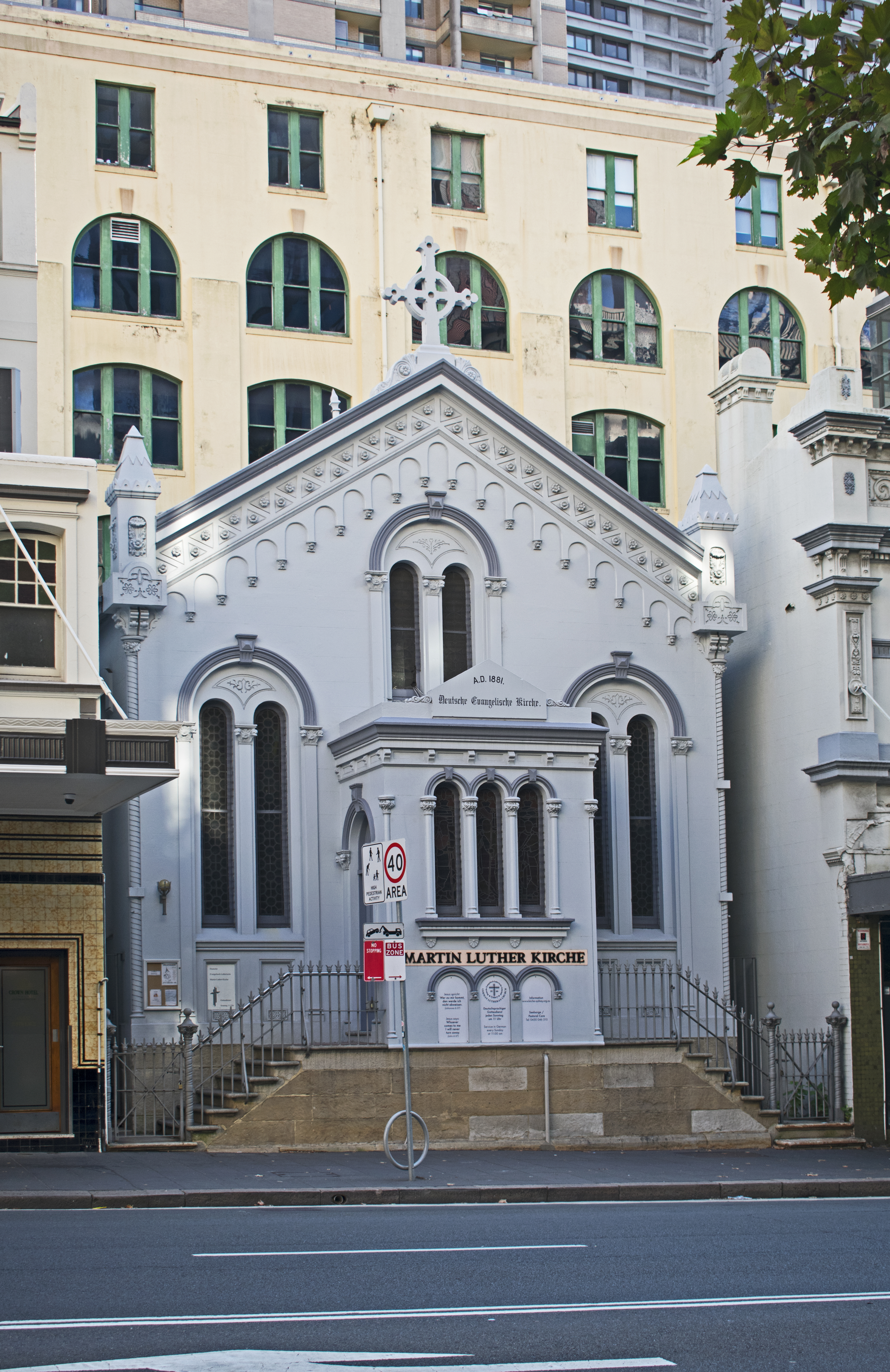
Martin Luther Church in Sydney was built in 1881.

The first Lutherans to come to Australia in any significant number were the immigrants from Prussia, who arrived in 1838 with Pastor August Kavel. This period in Prussia was marked by a persecution of "Old Lutherans" who refused to join the Prussian Union under King Frederick Wilhelm.

In 1841, a second wave of Prussian immigrants started, with the arrival of Pastor Gotthard Fritzsche. He settled with the migrants in his group in Lobethal and Bethanien (now Bethany) in South Australia. The Lutheran church of this period is referred to as the Kavel-Fritzsche Synod.

A split occurred within the South Australian Lutheran community in 1846, and two separate synods were established. The followers of Kavel founded the Langmeil-Light Pass Synod, which eventually was renamed the United Evangelical Lutheran Church in Australia. The followers of Fritzsche founded the Bethany-Lobethal Synod, which eventually joined with other synods that had developed and became the Evangelical Lutheran Church of Australia. These two denominations joined to form the LCA in 1966.

A significant influx occurred after World War II and migration also brought a number of Lutherans from other European countries. Lutherans also set up missions in Aboriginal communities. Noel Pearson, for instance, was raised in such an environment.

In 2024, as a result of the 2023 decision of the LCA to ordain female pastors, several pastors and congregations separated from the LCA to form the Lutheran Mission – Australia.

== Demographics ==
Map of Statistical Areas coloured by percentage of people identifying as Lutheran at the 2011 Census

As of 2009, the church had 320 parishes, 540 congregations and 70,000 baptised members in Australia and 1,130 baptised members in New Zealand.

According to the Lutheran Church of Australia website in 2013, "Government censuses indicate that about 250,000 Australians and New Zealanders identify as Lutheran. In practice, though, the Lutheran Church of Australia (LCA), which includes the Lutheran Church of New Zealand (LCNZ), is a relatively small Christian denomination, with about 60,000 regular worshippers."

In the 2021 Australian census, 145,868 people stated their religion as Lutheranism.

== Structure ==
"The LCA is a 'synodical' church, meaning that every congregation 'walks together' with every other congregation, every district with every other district, and every department or agency with every other one... [However] every congregation is... unique... So, while all congregations adhere to the LCA constitution, they are free to exercise their own interpretations of the LCA's mission and ministry objectives."

Every three years representatives of the LCA's congregations meet for a Synod meeting. Pastors provide input regarding theological matters, but in effect it is the people in the pews, rather than church leaders, who determine the direction of [the] church."

== Logo ==
According to the church, "Our logo represents how we see ourselves as two nations under the Southern Cross, created by God, redeemed by Jesus Christ and empowered by the Holy Spirit to serve the people of our two nations and the world."

== Tagline ==
The church's tagline is "Where Love Comes to Life", which congregants believe "reflects the heart and soul of [their] mission".

== Worship music and modernisation of hymns ==
The official hymn book of the Lutheran Church of Australia is the Lutheran Hymnal with Supplement.

The church is happy to use gender-inclusive language where this does not detract from the teachings of the Bible will modernise the language of its hymns where such modernisation is practical.

== Culture ==
=== Theological conservatism ===
In comparison to many Lutheran synods in Europe, the Lutheran Church of Australia as of 2012 remains a strongly confessional church. The reason for this is two-fold. Firstly, there was the early influence of the Old Lutherans and, secondly, "from the 1880s the church sought pastors from the US (Missouri Synod)." The influence of these American Lutherans caused the LCA to deviate from the doctrines of the more mainstream (or, indeed, liberal) European Lutherans.

The church is happy to support the Australian Christian Lobby where such an emphasis is supportive of the teachings of the Word of God.

=== Twenty-first-century challenges ===
As it grapples with the issue of how it should modernise yet stay faithful to Christ's teachings, the church is experiencing declining membership across Australia. According to the 2011 Australian census, there are now more Hindus than Lutherans in Australia.

== Beliefs and stances ==
=== Core beliefs ===
The LCA very believes that the Bible is the primary source of revelation and instruction for Christians. This Lutheran doctrine is known as sola scriptura. According to this doctrine, though revelation through experience is of importance, it does not prevail over sola scriptura.

The church "adhere[s] to the three ecumenical (or universal) creeds of Christians around the world." It also "subscribes to the central teachings (or confessions) of Lutherans worldwide."

=== Censorship ===
The church advocates film censorship, stating that "X-rated and violent videos are an assault on God's gifts; they pervert his gift of sexuality, and deny the dignity of human beings." The church rejects the idea that the definition of what is pornographic may be subjective and differ from audience to audience. To the contrary, the church feels that, "The trite comment, 'Evil is in the eye of the beholder', does not take seriously the evil in all people, including those who profit from the exploitation of men, women and children who are used in the production of this material. It also ignores the addictive and controlling influence of X-rated and violent videos."

=== Sex and sexuality ===
Like historical Christianity, the LCA holds to conservative views on sex. Although it does not oppose contraception, overall it feels "that normally married couples should have children ... Nowhere in Scripture, however, is there any indication that married couples should produce offspring to the extent of their biological maximum. Nor has the church ever taught this [but] all avoidance of parenthood for selfish reasons, such as unwillingness to assume the responsibilities and sacrifices of bearing and rearing children, is opposed to the will of God. They warn especially against a self-indulgent use of contraceptives."

The church continues to hold a sacred view of marriage and believes that sexual relations belong within the marriage relationship. The church believes that pre-marital sex is in "violation of the will of God. The wide use of contraceptives has aided the general decline in sexual morality."

==== Homosexuality ====
The Lutheran Church of Australia's "Statement on Homosexuality" was adopted by the General Synod, 1975 Convention. It contains the following paragraphs.

"God's Word is silent about homosexuality as a propensity. In view of this and in the light of medical, and psychological evidence, the Church may not condemn or judge homosexual propensity. It is part of the mysterious disturbance and distortion that has entered God's creation and his created social structures. Like disease, it must be seen in the context of the Fall and the resultant intrusion of disruptive and abnormal forces which have upset and perverted God's original design."

"God's word regards this disruption and perversion as a judgement of God on the whole of humanity so that in this sense all people are somehow involved."

The Church and the Homosexual "As in the case of pain and disease, the Christian homosexual should accept his homosexual propensity in obedience to God, bear his cross bravely, seek all possible professional help and pastoral aid, and in faith resist the strong temptation of rebelling and murmuring against God"

Treatment "Skilled counselling may be helpful, particularly to the young (under 35 years of age)."

"Hormone treatment will not change the direction of the sexual drive, although it may lessen its intensity."

"Punishment does not result in change of propensity, although it may restrict overt behaviour."

The regular Convention of the LCA in 2013 was presented with an interim paper entitled "Human Sexuality: Key Issues today." A larger paper was presented to the General Pastors' Conference for discussion and comment. These papers are a stage along the way to producing a statement on human sexuality, as the Church re-examines, explains and applies its teaching pastorally. The new statement will also replace the LCA's 1975 statement on homosexuality. (pg 283ff)

Like many Protestant churches, the LCA "does not condemn nor judge homosexuality and claims the Bible is silent on homosexual orientation. Homosexuals are welcomed into the congregation." The LCA has communicated that the church does not consider sexual orientation to be a choice, saying, "People do not generally choose to be homosexual." The LCA's statements on homosexuality and same-sex relationships include a statement that defines marriage as heterosexual, between one man and one woman, and also supports civil unions, that provide the same legal rights of marriage, for same-sex couples. Church guidelines do not allow for same-sex marriages to be conducted by clergy, but the church has said it does not prohibit, or encourage, the use of church sanctuaries and halls for same-sex marriages performed by civil celebrants; that decision is left to the local congregation.

==== Gender politics ====
The LCA rejects new translations of the Bible and liturgy that use inclusive language in reference to God. Rather, the church feels that (with regard to calling God "the Father"), "The language which we use for God is not merely metaphorical or picture language. Our language for God involves the actual nature of God as revealed to us in Christ. The God who is revealed to humanity in the holy Scriptures is Father, Son, and Holy Spirit, three persons in the one Godhead... [However]... When the writers of the holy Scriptures speak of God, they use a wide range of images, metaphors, and symbols to describe what God is like or how God regards and deals with Israel and the human race. Included in these various images and symbols is the use of maternal imagery."

The LCA has voted on six occasions on the question of the ordination of women. On the first five occasions, it did not succeed even though a majority of representatives have voted for the ordination of women. This is because a change to the doctrine of the church requires a two-thirds majority support. Church leaders have recognised the divisiveness of this issue and the capacity for it to cause a schism which could result in the church becoming non-viable. On 5 October 2024, the General Synod voted to remove the clause banning ordination of women from their "Theses of Agreement", thus opening the possibility of women's ordination. Previously, women could serve as lay readers and assist at the distribution of Holy Communion, but not as pastors. On April 13, 2025, the LCA ordained its first female pastor, Maria Rudolph.

=== Church and state ===
The LCA believes in the separation of church and state: "The church has been charged with only one commission by its risen and ascended Lord: to preach the gospel of the forgiveness of sins, life, and salvation to a lost and dying world... Only harm can result if the different roles of church and state, different but also complementary, are not observed and kept distinct. Confusion of the two leads directly to various evils: either church or state becomes an oppressive power, or both do; the church loses its reason for existence..."

Furthermore, the LCA acknowledges "The church as such has no special power to legislate on any political question or problem. Nor has it the right to endeavour to exert political pressure, for instance, by forming a political party or by lobbying or by instructing its members how they must vote in political elections or referendums. Its members must act together with all members of society to do what is possible in each political case on the basis of what reason suggests and the power available permits. The church as such can and should, of course, point quite distinctly to the will of God (the Law) to which all people, including all those in authority, should be obedient..."

"This basic principle... holds also in respect of social problems. Some of these involve the moral law and the church must not fail to bear witness to God's will where that will is quite plain. Many other social problems call for the exercise of love. In these the church as a corporate body, and not only through its members, can and should act when emergencies are there and when society as a whole in any particular place is unaware of the problem or incapable of action in relation to it. Examples of such action are church activities in providing education or health services and medical care, or poor relief in backward or temporarily disorganised and helpless areas. This work may become unnecessary as society becomes more aware of, or more capable of meeting, its responsibilities, and as a whole does what the church has previously done in a vicarious capacity."

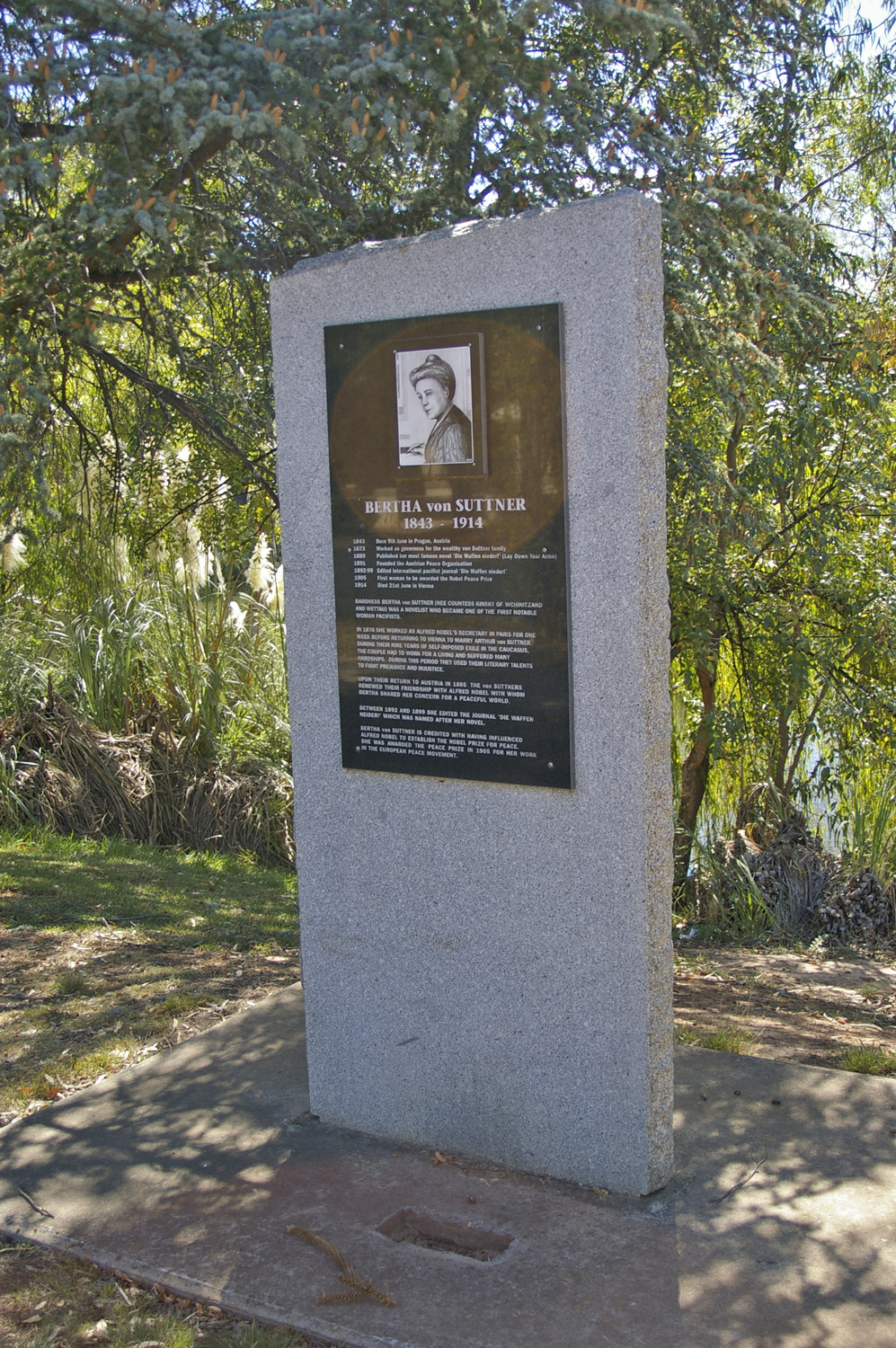
Australian monument honouring Austro-German pacifist Bertha von Suttner.

German Australian culture is deeply pacifist. Indeed, many Germans came to Australia to escape militarism. As evidence of this, there is a memorial to Bertha von Suttner in Wagga Wagga. Reflecting this, "The church... accepts the validity of a person's refusal to engage in military service if he or she is convinced that participation in a military conflict amounts to the transgression of God's commandment 'You shall not kill'... The church maintains that warfare which potentially and actually involves the mass destruction of human beings is never justified." The story of German anti-Nazi pacifist Sophie Scholl is frequently taught in Australian Lutheran schools.

Furthermore, "The church lives in a fallen, sinful world in rebellion against God's laws and institutions, against his will and ordinances. It 'carries the burdens of others' (cf Gal 6:2), especially of people oppressed and suffering injustice inflicted on them by those who, instead of justice, exercise brutal power. With the prophets and apostles, it proclaims God's judgment against those who do such evil... The church realises that, in a conflict-ridden world, wars are initiated as a result of greed, rivalry, suspicion, lust for power, etc. Against such evils and their disastrous consequences, the church raises its warning and pleading voice... The church views with deep concern and sadness the enormous build-up of nuclear and other destructive armaments in the world today... The escalation of weapon systems and their possible use create anxiety, fear, and unrest throughout the world, and pose a real threat to present and future generations and their natural habitat... The church pleads with governments and the citizens of their countries to embark on nuclear disarmament. It cannot under any circumstances support either wars of mass destruction or armed conflicts which violate the mandate of peace and the principles of justice. The church denounces the use of financial resources required for help in the existing areas of global human need (eg hunger, homelessness, disease, and poverty) for the manufacture and deployment of weapons of mass destruction... The church supports legislation which recognises the validity of conscientious objection of citizens..."

Despite their avowed pacifism and belief in the separation of church and state, the LCA still sponsors military chaplains.

=== Social activism ===
In theory, the LCA is outspoken when it comes to issues such as opposing warfare. Officially, it has stated that it must give "witness to governments about its commitment to the word of God and to prayer for peace. It will inform the authorities of its views on relevant legislative and political decisions, socio-moral issues, ethical concerns, economic circumstances, and other matters which affect the well-being and security of the people. The church cannot afford to be silent in the face of mounting armaments and increasing national and international tensions; to do so would be to fail in its obligation to help prevent mass destruction and to minimise global conflict."

However, the LCA has some reservations when it comes to deciding how much attention it should give to other social justice issues. Indeed, some members are concerned that "Full membership [of the Lutheran World Federation] could lead us down the path of social activism since some LWF churches seem to care more about social justice than justification by faith."

Other LCA congregants look on this differently, feeling that "The LWF will help us become more conscious of the social implications of the gospel and provide opportunities to work in partnership with other Lutherans in addressing questions of international significance."

Despite its reservations on speaking out extensively on issues, the LCA does recognise Social Justice Sunday.

Also, in the past the church has been prepared to join the other major Christian denominations in protesting against Queensland's culture of political corruption, even when the then-premier, Joh Bjelke-Petersen, was himself of Lutheran heritage. Indeed, "As Bjelke-Petersen's premiership progressed there emerged from religious sources, and on religious grounds, some resistance to the policies Bjelke-Petersen and his administration were pursuing. The ban on street marching, the assault on indigenous missions and the SEQEB industrial dispute all precipitated strenuous opposition from mainstream churches, particularly the Catholic, Anglican and Uniting. Even the Queensland president of the Lutheran Church, Bjelke-Petersen's denomination, more than once took his place alongside leaders of the other three major churches at press conferences, criticising actions or policies of the State Government."

"The inspiration for this development of Church taking on the State was the Confessing Church in 1930s Germany, the Second Vatican Council, church involvement in the US civil rights movement, and new theological movements such as feminist, black and liberation theology which gathered momentum through the 1960s and 70s."

=== Human rights ===
The church rejects the notion of human rights: "The word of God nowhere declares that human beings have fundamental rights which they can claim or secure or extend. Nowhere does the Bible mention the concept of human rights or its equivalent; nowhere does it refer to sacred, inviolable, immutable rights which are based in human nature as such. Nowhere are they considered as direct realisations of the will of God. They are not a divine law, not eternal truths. [However] the contribution of Christian theology to the secular concern for human rights will be critical assessment and elucidation so that that concern may acquire a basic direction which corresponds to, or is parallel to, Christian ethics."

==== Capital punishment ====
In contrast to nearly all mainstream Protestant denominations, including the Anglican and Uniting Churches, the Lutheran Church does not emphatically reject capital punishment. Rather, it states that "because of the lack of a clear biblical directive, the church can only say that capital punishment is not contrary to the will of God, but is not demanded by God... Nevertheless, the church should not cease its witness to the sanctity of human life and demand punishment for those who commit murder. At the same time the church should encourage the state to develop clear and plausible concepts of the reason, meaning and purpose of the punishments which by law it determines for crimes that have been committed." However, a way to administer capital punishment objectively is out of reach from mankind as a whole. Therefore, Lutherans believe that it should not be administered. As it says in the book of Romans chapter 12 verse 19 "Dear friends, never take revenge. Leave that to the righteous anger of God. For the Scriptures say, "I will take revenge; I will pay them back," says the LORD."

=== Abortion ===
The Lutheran Church of Australia is anti-abortion. However, it "recognises that there are circumstances under which a termination of pregnancy may properly be considered, namely, when competent medical people are of the opinion that the life of the mother can be saved only by terminating the pregnancy. In such a case, it is a question, humanly speaking, of choosing between one human life and another. A choice cannot be avoided. Before choosing to abort the child the mother should, if possible, seek both medical and pastoral guidance... There are other special cases -- for example, pregnancies which result from incest, rape, or other perverted sexual relationships -- and special problems with which parents and members of the medical and nursing profession have to wrestle. These special cases and situations must always be evaluated and decided in the light of the basic principle that the fetus is human life created by God... The Lutheran Church firmly believes that hospital authorities should respect the conscientious objections of medical and nursing personnel to the performing of abortions."

=== Papacy ===
Historically, Lutherans from Martin Luther onwards thought that the office of the pope was the Antichrist. The Lutheran Church of Australia tends to be more conciliatory: "The Lutheran Church of Australia cannot continue to affirm at this time that the Roman papacy bears the distinguishing features of the Antichrist. We dialogue with Roman Catholics as with brothers and sisters in the faith; we certainly do not regard them as people under the authority and spirit of Antichrist."

However, "the papacy still presents formidable problems for Lutherans. The Pope continues to see himself as the vicar of Christ, claiming the right and power to represent the whole church as Christ's supreme representative. Although papal infallibility is now limited by provisos, it is still maintained."

=== Saints and prayers to the dead ===
The church does not believe that prayers to the dead are in order and therefore it does not support the practice in any way. It teaches, as the Scriptures proclaim, that prayers should be directed to God through Jesus Christ. Christians are nevertheless thankful for the life of a deceased person.

With regard to saints, the church feels that "departed saints can provide us with examples of how to live the Christian life. We can certainly honour and acknowledge them in our prayer life, but we do not look to them for help or to answer our prayers. Jesus is our one mediator to God the Father."

=== Creationism ===
The church believes God created the world but has not made a theological statement as to how. It accepts the basic biblical narratives and poems of creation, which emphasise that human beings are created in the image of God and not by some form of evolvement aside from the Creator and from other species.

== Ecumenical dialogues ==
"Dialogue, as the Lutheran Church of Australia (LCA) understands the term, is official and authorised conversations with churches which are not in altar and pulpit fellowship with the LCA. The conversations concern matters of faith, doctrine, and practice. The purpose of dialogues may vary from time to time. The basic aim is that the truth, as confessed and practised by the LCA, is brought to bear on matters of faith and life in the context of dialogue.... All genuine dialogue will be conducted 'in view of eternity' and with the firm belief that in such conversations the truth will prevail for the welfare of the church and the glory of the Lord of the one holy catholic church."

"Traditionally, the LCA has taken as its starting point for fellowship with other churches agreement in the doctrine of the gospel and the sacraments. Doctrine has come first. Increasingly, Lutherans and others are starting from the ancient church's understanding of communio, which grounds communion among Christians as well as among churches in the mutual communion between the Father, his Son, and their Spirit. The church as the icon of the Trinity finds the source and goal of its own life in its participation in the life of the divine Trinity. The mutual love between the persons of the Trinity also permeates and forms the communion (koinonia) of the church on earth, which is both proclaimed and enacted in the eucharist... The unity that we share through our common life in the triune God is grounded in baptism and confirmed and strengthened in the Lord's supper. All who are united with Christ by baptism and faith are made one body with him as they eat.. the Lord's supper... The unity of all believers is a gift of the triune God. God draws us into communion with himself through the gospel and the holy sacraments."

From the 1970s onwards, there has been much more dialogue with other mainstream Christian denominations. The Church states that "Our commitment to dialogue with the Roman Catholic, Anglican, and Uniting churches reflects a growing conviction that our ecumenical engagement is not an optional extra but is central to what it means to be a church in the world."

In 2001, the Anglican and Lutheran churches jointly produced a document entitled Covenanting for Mutual Recognition and Reconciliation between the Anglican Church of Australia and the Lutheran Church in Australia in order to further this aim.

However, despite these movements towards greater openness to others, the church is still only an affiliate member of the Lutheran World Federation because of concerns that "Our Lutheran confessional identity may be eroded because many LWF member churches are not as strongly confessional as the LCA" and "Some LWF member churches (like the ELCA in America) have entered into communion with non-Lutheran churches whose doctrinal position is not in agreement with the Lutheran confessions".

Although the church advocates multiculturalism, it does not endorse religious pluralism.

== Role in education ==
The first Lutheran school in Australia opened in 1839. Today, there are twenty-seven Lutheran-run primary and secondary schools in Queensland, thirty-three in South Australia and sixteen in Victoria, with a much smaller number in each of the other states and territories. The body overseeing these is Lutheran Education Australia, which has a branch in each State.

=== Rapid growth ===
There has been a very significant growth in Lutheran school enrolments over the last twenty-five years and particularly in the last decade. As of August 2011, 37 313 Australian children attended Lutheran schools, with another 3 600 in early childhood centres. At this time, there were 3 249 teachers employed at Lutheran schools around Australia.

=== Values ===
"The church acknowledges that parents have the first responsibility for the education of their children. Through its schools, therefore, the church seeks to support parents in the fulfilment of this responsibility to their children. Furthermore, the church, through its schools, offers to all parents the option of a Christian education for their children... The church urges and encourages schools and local congregations to work together in worship and mission in the world of the school."

The LCA has stated that "The church acknowledges that the state has accepted responsibility for providing schooling for all its citizens. This education is compulsory, free, and secular in its orientation... The church further acknowledges that the government permits non-government authorities, such as the churches, to operate schools, provided that they meet certain government- determined criteria, such as curriculum and health and safety requirements. The church will continue to own and operate its schools in accordance with government requirements, provided that meeting these requirements does not bring the church into conflict with the word of God and the teachings of the church. The church will continue to accept financial assistance from the government under conditions determined by the government from time to time, provided that the teachings of the church are in no way or at any time compromised."

The LCA feels that "The church is present in the Lutheran school as staff, parents, and students are gathered by the gospel and nurtured by word and sacrament. This community of the faithful will be active in all the functions of the church, namely worship, nurture, fellowship, witness, and service... public ministry is 'public, foundational, and ecumenical, since it is by the public proclamation of the gospel and the public administration of the sacraments the Holy Spirit creates, upholds, and extends the church throughout the world'. Accordingly, if the gospel is to inform the Lutheran school, the public ministry needs to be present..."

Hence, "In order to fulfil this ministry and mission, teachers in the Lutheran school will not only be qualified and competent educators. They will also

- be committed to the Christian faith as confessed by the Lutheran church
- be willing to identify with, uphold and promote the Lutheran ethos of the school
- exemplify and model the Christian lifestyle in and beyond the school."

The "schools seek to nurture integrated individuals, who

- are guided by core values and reflecting the characteristics of God especially love, justice, compassion, forgiveness, service, humility, courage, hope, quality and appreciation,
- serve their communities by being:
  - self-directed, insightful investigators and learners
  - discerning, resourceful problem solvers and implementers
  - adept, creative producers and contributors
  - open, responsive communicators and facilitators
  - principled, resilient leaders and collaborators
  - caring, steadfast supporters and advocates"

"Lutheran schools see each student as unique and offer an education program that will allow each student to develop their God-given abilities as fully as possible, providing programs for students with disabilities as well as those assessed as gifted and talented."

=== Other educational activities ===
There are also Lutheran school programs for indigenous and rural and remote students.

The Australian Lutheran College, based in Adelaide, offers theological and teacher education.

== Role in pastoral care ==
The church states that "We Lutherans believe that we are called to love people as Christ loved us - and that doesn't mean only those people who are members of our church. Wherever we are able, we gladly extend our loving care to anyone who might need us, including those who are elderly, disabled or disadvantaged in any way. Increasingly we are offering a helping hand also to Indigenous people, and refugees and new arrivals. We believe the words of Jesus, who said that when we reach out in love and care to someone else, we do it for him (Matthew 25:37.)".

The LCA provides pastoral care for the following groups in particular:

- retired and elderly people
- people with disabilities
- homeless or at risk
- families and relationships
- Indigenous Australians
- refugees and new arrivals

The Church also runs an operation to provide food as a way of bonding communities. Indeed, it feels that this aspect of charity is one of its strengths. They state that "Hospitality involving food is something Lutherans have always been good at. It's indigenous to who we are. Perhaps it started with the traditional German heritage many of us share – where hard manual labour fuelled large healthy appetites. Perhaps it's the blessings we now enjoy, thanks to the many cultures that gather in our Australian and New Zealand congregations as Lutherans. Perhaps it all goes back to Martin Luther himself who regularly brought people together around food and wine for his famous 'Table Talk' sessions."

They also cite "the example of Jesus who enjoyed food and hospitality as a way to break down barriers and connect with those for whom society had no time."

=== State-based organisations ===
Lutheran Care, based in Adelaide, South Australia, offers a wide range of services.

== Affiliations ==
The Lutheran Church in Australia is:

- a member of the National Council of Churches in Australia
- an associate member of the Lutheran World Federation
- formerly an observer member of the International Lutheran Council

It also has an "altar and pulpit fellowship" with the two Lutheran churches in Papua New Guinea, these being the:

- Evangelical Lutheran Church of Papua New Guinea
- Gutnius Lutheran Church of Papua New Guinea

"A unique partnership exists between the LCA and Lutheran Church–Canada (LCC). This is the only church with which the LCA has entered into a formal 'Recognition of Relationship'. The document was co-signed by the presidents of the two churches in 1993."

== Media ==
The church's national magazine, The Lutheran is published monthly. It is "one of the most highly awarded publications within the Australasian Religious Press Association."

The Lutheran Media Ministry has been operating for over sixty-five years. The church feels that "broadcasting messages is a cost-effective way of spreading the good news of Jesus Christ."

"Every week Lutheran Media programs are broadcast nearly 600 times on over 500 stations across Australia to an estimated audience of 1 million people... Special programs are broadcast on Good Friday and Christmas Day."

The Lutheran Church of Australia also has a television show, On Main Street. "It tackles socially relevant issues from a positive Christian perspective and offers free booklets dealing with the issues discussed. It is broadcast over the Australian Christian Channel on AUSTAR DIGITAL 182, FOXTEL DIGITAL 182; TRANSACT (Canberra) and OPTUS 49/DIGITAL 182."

"Christmas programs are shown on the commercial networks, as well as the Australian Christian Channel. These films are also available [for sale]."

The Lutheran Theological Journal is published three times a year and contains articles relating to the church, churchworkers and Lutheranism in Australia. Co-editors James Winderlich and Anna Nuernberger (both staff members of Australian Lutheran College) direct the focus of each issue.

The church also runs a number of websites and mailing lists.

== Festivities ==
The LCA celebrates Easter and Christmas. Congregants also celebrate Reformation Sunday with a special feast.

== Notable Australian Lutheran women ==
- Helga Josephine Zinnbauer
- Wendy Mayer

== See also ==
- German settlement in Australia
- St Peter's Lutheran Church, Hobart
