= Evangelical Lutheran Church of Brazil =

- Igreja Evangelica Luterana do Brasil
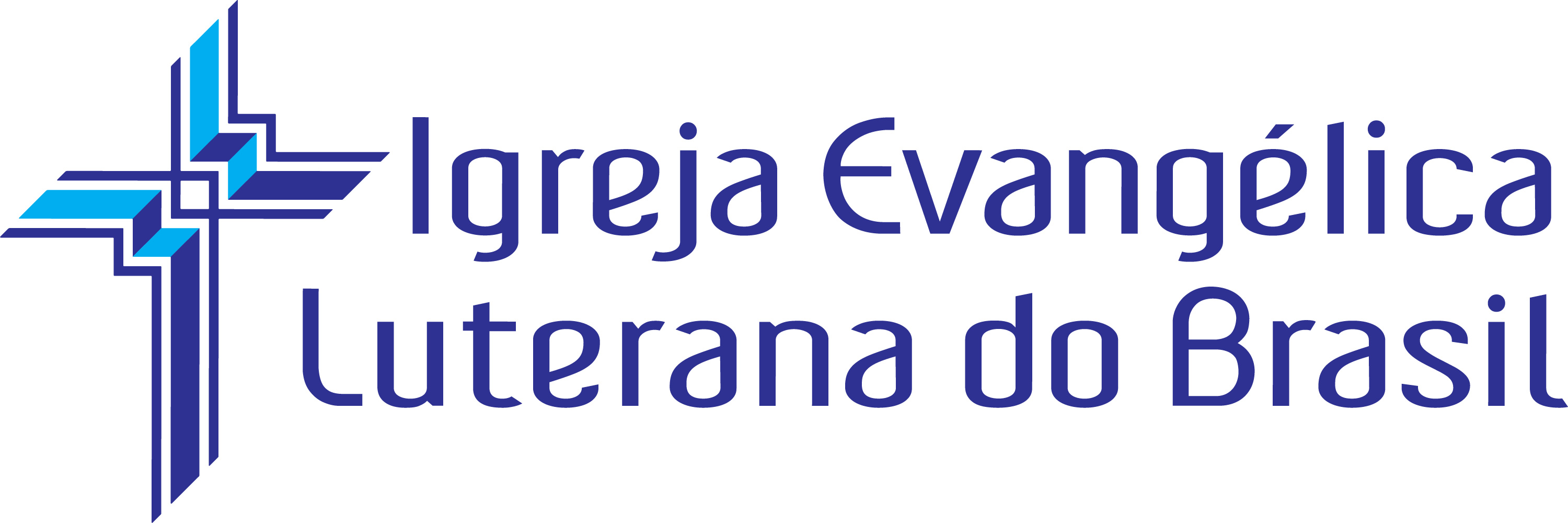
- Classification: Protestant
- Orientation: Lutheran
- Theology: Confessional Lutheran
- President: Rev. Geraldo Walmir Schüler
- Region: Brazil
- Headquarters: Porto Alegre, Brazil
- Origin: 1980
- Branched from: Lutheran Church – Missouri Synod
- Congregations: 1,496
- Members: 243,093 baptized 189,970 confirmed
- Ministers: 851
- Official website: ielb.org.br

The Evangelical Lutheran Church of Brazil (Portuguese: Igreja Evangélica Luterana do Brasil, IELB) is a Lutheran church, which was founded in 1904 in Rio Grande do Sul, a southern state in Brazil.

The IELB is a conservative, confessional Lutheran synod that holds to the Book of Concord. It started as a mission of the Lutheran Church – Missouri Synod and was the Brazilian District of that body. The IELB became an independent church body in 1980. It has about 243,093 members. The IELB is a member of the International Lutheran Council.
