= International Lutheran Council =

Worldwide association

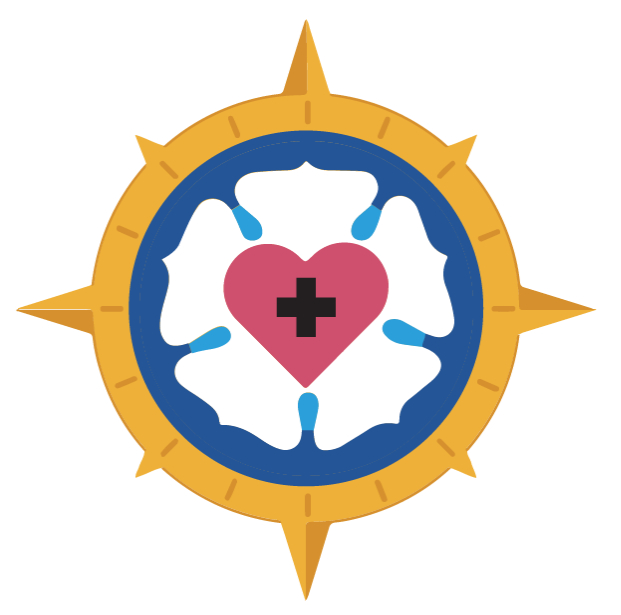
- Type: Association
- Classification: Protestant
- Orientation: Lutheran
- Theology: Confessional Lutheran
- Chairman: Juhana Pohjola
- Secretary: Gijsbertus van Hattem
- General Secretary: Rev. Dr. Klaus Detlev Schulz
- Treasurer: Gerry Wiley
- Origin: 1993
- Members: 6,950,000 - 8,500,000
- Ministers: 10,000
- Official website: ilcouncil.org

The International Lutheran Council (ILC) is a worldwide association of confessional Lutheran denominations. Member bodies of the ILC hold "an unconditional commitment to the Holy Scriptures as the inspired and infallible Word of God and to the Lutheran Confessions contained in the Book of Concord as the true and faithful exposition of the Word of God." The member church bodies are not required to be in church-fellowship with one another, though many of them are.

The organization was constituted in 1993 at a council held in Antigua, Guatemala, although it traces its roots back to theological conferences held in various locations during the 1950s and 1960s. It is to be distinguished from the Lutheran World Federation (LWF) and the Confessional Evangelical Lutheran Conference.

The council has 60 participating churches as of 2026. Among its larger members are the Malagasy Lutheran Church (5.3 million members), the Lutheran Church – Missouri Synod (LCMS 1.6 million members ), the Evangelical Lutheran Church of Brazil (243,093 members), and the Evangelical Lutheran Church in Kenya (350,000 members). Altogether, approximately 7,150,000 adherents belonged to ILC member churches in 2018, with other churches such as the Evangelical Lutheran Church of Latvia (250,000 members) and the Evangelical Lutheran Synod Church of South Sudan and Sudan (150,000 members) being added to the ILC in 2022–2024.

The council's chairman is Bishop Juhana Pohjola of the Evangelical Lutheran Mission Diocese of Finland. The executive secretary is Albert B. Collver III of the LCMS. Delegates to the ILC meet every two years.

The organization has not accepted the Joint Declaration on the Doctrine of Justification, an agreement reached by the Catholic Church's Pontifical Council for Promoting Christian Unity (PCPCU) and the Lutheran World Federation, in 1999. However, the ILC has been involved in dialogue with the PCPCU, with a final report released on 30 November 2021.

In recent years, several churches affiliated with the LWF have expressed interest in building closer ties to or applying for membership in the ILC due to its traditional theological viewpoints, which has caused the LWF to completely sever ties with the ILC.

== History ==
The origins of the ILC go back to a meeting at Uelzen, Germany, in July 1952 by Lutherans who were not happy with the theological course being taken by the Lutheran World Federation. Among the participants were delegates from the LCMS who had been observers at the LWF assembly in Hannover. Other delegates were present from churches affiliated with the LCMS from Germany, Australia, Denmark, and the United Kingdom. Two further meetings were held, in Oakland, California, in 1958 and in Cambridge, England, in August 1963. At the latter meeting it was decided to create a permanent organization, a "Continuation Committee", to act for the group in between meetings, which were now dubbed International Lutheran Theological Conferences. The committee was also tasked with publishing a theological journal and a committee bulletin, and with facilitating exchanges of pastors, theological professors, and students. However, the meeting explicitly disclaimed it was founding a group in opposition to the LWF.

Five more "theological conferences" were held until the name was shortened to International Lutheran Conference at the Eighth Conference in Porto Alegre, Rio Grande do Sul, Brazil. Resolutions passed during this period described the ILC as a partnership, forum, or "group of independent Lutheran churches". At the Fifteenth Conference in Antigua, Guatemala, the group decided on creating a more formal structure as an association of churches and adopted a set of Guiding Principles that would serve as a constitution and theological point of reference. The "Continuation Committee" was replaced by an "Executive Council".

At the 2018 World Conference meeting, held in Antwerp, Belgium, on 25–26 September 2018, the ILC voted to admit 17 new church bodies, 11 as full members and 6 as associate members. This increased the church members of ILC to 54 and their faithful to 7.15 million members.

At the 2022 World Conference meeting, the Evangelical Lutheran Church of Latvia was accepted as a full member. It had already been accepted as an observer member in February 2022.

== Chairmen ==
- 1993–1995: Edwin Lehman, Lutheran Church – Canada
- 1995–1998: Leopoldo Heimann, Evangelical Lutheran Church of Brazil
- 1998–2007: Ralph Mayan, Lutheran Church – Canada
- 2007–2010: Gerald B. Kieschnick, Lutheran Church – Missouri Synod
- 2010–2022: Hans-Jörg Voigt, Independent Evangelical-Lutheran Church, first as interim chairman, and since September 20, 2012, as regular chairman
- 2022–present: Juhana Pohjola, Evangelical Lutheran Mission Diocese of Finland

== World Conferences ==
The organization has held a number of conferences over the years.

=== International Lutheran Theological Conference (1952–1975) ===
- 1. 1952 – Uelzen, Germany
- 2. 1959 – Oakland, California, United States
- 3. 1963 – Cambridge, England
- 4. 1966 – Frankfurt, Germany
- 5. 1968 – Cambridge, England
- 6. 1970 – St. Louis, United States
- 7. 1973 – Madras, India
- 8. 1975 – Porto Alegre, Brazil (At this meeting, the name changed to “International Lutheran Conference”)

=== International Lutheran Conference (1978–1993) ===
- 9. 1978 – Papua New Guinea
- 10. 1981 – St. Louis, United States
- 11. 1984 – Obot Idim, Nigeria
- 12. 1987 – Berlin, Germany
- 13. 1989 – Seoul, South Korea
- 14. 1991 – Hong Kong
- 15. 1993 – Antigua, Guatemala (At this meeting, the name changed to “International Lutheran Council”)

=== International Lutheran Council (1995–present) ===
- 16. 1995 – Adelaide, Australia
- 17. 1997 – St. Louis, United States
- 18. 1999 – Cambridge, England
- 19. 2001 – Warburg, South Africa
- 20. 2003 – Foz do Iguaçu, Brazil
- 21. 2005 – Berlin, Germany
- 22. 2007 – Accra, Ghana
- 23. 2009 – Seoul, South Korea
- 24. 2012 – Niagara Falls, Canada
- 25. 2015 – Buenos Aires, Argentina
- 26. 2018 – Antwerp, Belgium
- 27. 2022 – Kisumu, Kenya
- 28. 2025 – Panglao, Bohol, Philippines

== Members ==

ILC members
Region	Country	Church or organization	Member Type	Membership	Clergy
North America	Canada	Lutheran Church – Canada	Full	42,943	234
North America	Haiti	Evangelical Lutheran Church of Haiti	Full	12,000	
North America	Guatemala	Lutheran Church in Guatemala	Full	4,200	5
North America	Mexico	Lutheran Synod of Mexico	Full	500	6
North America	Panama	Evangelical Lutheran Church of Panama	Associate	550	5
North America	United States	Lutheran Church – Missouri Synod	Full	1,674,315	5,874
North America	United States	American Association of Lutheran Churches	Full	8,600	110
North America	United States	Lutheran Bible Translators (LBT)	Recognized Organization		
Europe	Belgium	Evangelical Lutheran Church in Belgium	Full	140	2
Europe	Denmark	Evangelical Lutheran Free Church in Denmark	Associate	77	2
Europe	Finland	Evangelical Lutheran Mission Diocese of Finland	Full	2,888	76
Europe	France	Evangelical Lutheran Church—Synod of France	Full	821	8
Europe	Germany	Independent Evangelical-Lutheran Church	Full	33,036	109
Europe	Latvia	Evangelical Lutheran Church of Latvia	Full	250,000	134
Europe	Norway	The Evangelical-Lutheran Diocese in Norway	Full	45	3
Europe	Norway/Iceland	The Lutheran Church in Norway and Iceland	Full	150	6
Europe	Portugal	Portuguese Evangelical Lutheran Church	Full	95	2
Europe	Russia	Evangelical Lutheran Church of Ingria in Russia	Full	12,000	167 (includes deacons)
Europe	Russia	Siberian Evangelical Lutheran Church	Full	2,100	19 (includes deacons)
Europe	Sweden	Mission Province in Sweden	Full	2,000	46
Europe	Sweden	The Corpus Christi Association	Recognized Organization		
Europe	Turkey/Bulgaria	Istanbul Lutheran Church	Full	200	3
Europe	United Kingdom	Evangelical Lutheran Church of England	Full	900	12
Asia/Oceania	Australia	Lutheran Mission – Australia	Full		
Asia/Oceania	India	India Evangelical Lutheran Church	Observer	115,000	220
Asia/Oceania	Indonesia	Indonesian Christian Lutheran Church	Full	25,000	50
Asia/Oceania	Kazakhstan	Evangelical Lutheran Church of Kazakhstan	Full	500	5
Asia/Oceania	Myanmar	Myanmar Lutheran Church	Full	3,830	12
Asia/Oceania	Philippines	Lutheran Church in the Philippines	Full	24,600	
Asia/Oceania	South Korea	Lutheran Church in Korea	Full	2,156	63
Asia/Oceania	Sri Lanka	Ceylon Evangelical Lutheran Church	Observer	800	4
Asia/Oceania	Taiwan	China Evangelical Lutheran Church	Full	2,010	26
Africa	Benin	Lutheran Church in Africa—Benin Synod	Full	400	3
Africa	Burundi	Hope Evangelical Lutheran Church in Burundi	Full	1,700	6
Africa	Cöte D’Ivoire	Église Luthérienne en Afrique-Synode de Côte d’Ivoire	Full	444	8
Africa	Democratic Republic of Congo	The Church of the Faithful Confessing Lutherans in Congo	Full	805	6
Africa	Democratic Republic of Congo	Confessional Evangelical Lutheran Church of Congo	Observer	100	5
Africa	Ethiopia	Ethiopian Evangelical Lutheran Church	Observer	27,534	61
Africa	Ghana	Evangelical Lutheran Church of Ghana	Full	7,500	50
Africa	Kenya	Evangelical Lutheran Church in Kenya	Full	100,000-350,000	121
Africa	Liberia	Evangelical Lutheran Church of Liberia	Full	7,327	
Africa	Madagasgar	Malagasy Lutheran Church	Full	4,000,000-5,300,000	1,500
Africa	Malawi	Confessional Lutheran Church – Malawi Synod	Full	3,610	9
Africa	Nigeria	The Lutheran Church of Nigeria	Full	41,152	470
Africa	Rwanda	Independent Evangelical Lutheran Congregation in Rwanda	Full	1,224	14
Africa	Rwanda	The Lutheran Mission in Africa—Synod of Thousand Hills	Observer	2,037	14
Africa	South Africa	Confessional Lutheran Synod of South Africa	Observer	899	4
Africa	South Africa	Free Evangelical Lutheran Synod in South Africa	Full	2,959	20
Africa	South Africa/Botswana	Lutheran Church in Southern Africa	Full	20,000	47
Africa	South Sudan	South Sudan Evangelical Lutheran Church	Observer	4,016	14
Africa	South Sudan/Sudan	Evangelical Lutheran Church in South Sudan and Sudan	Observer	150,000	66
Africa	Tanzania	Evangelical Lutheran Church of Tanzania – Lake Tanganyika Diocese	Recognized Organization	8,819	32
Africa	Tanzania	Evangelical Lutheran Church of Tanzania – South East of Lake Victoria Diocese	Recognized Organization	24,097	73
Africa	Uganda	Lutheran Church of Uganda	Full	54,000	71
South America	Argentina	Evangelical Lutheran Church of Argentina	Full	27,465	70
South America	Bolivia	Christian Evangelical Lutheran Church of Bolivia	Full	906	10
South America	Brazil	Evangelical Lutheran Church of Brazil	Full	239,274	960
South America	Chile	Confessional Lutheran Church of Chile	Full	136	
South America	Paraguay	The Evangelical Lutheran Church of Paraguay	Full	4,336	13
South America	Peru	Evangelical Lutheran Church – Peru	Associate	3,500	24
South America	Uruguay	Lutheran Church of Uruguay	Full	197	1
South America	Venezuela	Lutheran Church of Venezuela	Full	670	14

=== Former members ===
Former ILC members
Country	Church	Members	Clergy
Australia	Lutheran Church of Australia	145,868	450+
Japan	Japan Lutheran Church	766	
United States	Lutheran Ministerium and Synod – USA		

The Lutheran Church of Australia and the Japan Lutheran Church were removed from associate membership on March 21, 2025, due to their failure to adhere to the doctrinal position of the ILC. In particular, both churches had decided to allow the ordination of women into the pastoral office.

The Lutheran Ministerium and Synod – USA was a member, but that church body is no longer active.

=== Related church bodies ===
Additionally, there are churches which are not yet members of the ILC but have been allowed as guests within ILC conferences, including the Cambodia Lutheran Church and the Lutheran Brethren – Japan. There are also several churches that are not yet in the ILC but are in full altar-pulpit fellowship with multiple active ILC member churches or were established by ILC-affiliated churches, including the fast growing Confessional Lutheran Church in Angola and the Concordia Lutheran Church in Mozambique, born out of LCMS and IELB missionary efforts, and the The Union of Independent Evangelical Lutheran Congregations in Finland, which is in full communion with the Finnish Mission Diocese. A number of ILC churches are also in fellowship with the Evangelical Lutheran Church in Lithuania.

== See also ==
- List of Lutheran denominations
