= American Association of Lutheran Churches =

Lutheran denomination

- Abbreviation: AALC
- Classification: Protestant
- Orientation: Lutheran
- Theology: Confessional Lutheran
- Polity: Congregationalist
- Presiding Pastor: Cary G. Larson
- Associations: International Lutheran Council
- Headquarters: St. Paul, Minnesota
- Origin: November 7, 1987
- Separated from: American Lutheran Church
- Congregations: 56 (2025)
- Members: 16,000 (2008)
- Official website: www.taalc.org

The American Association of Lutheran Churches (AALC, also known as The AALC or TAALC) is a Lutheran church body based in the United States. It was formed on November 7, 1987, as a continuation of the American Lutheran Church denomination, the majority of which merged with the Lutheran Church in America and the Association of Evangelical Lutheran Churches to form the Evangelical Lutheran Church in America. The AALC offices were originally in Bloomington, Minnesota. The national office moved to Fort Wayne, Indiana, in 2007, and to Saint Paul, Minnesota, in 2022. In 2008, it had 67 congregations, with about 16,000 members. In 2020, the denomination listed 59 congregations. As of 2025, there are 56 congregations. Its current Presiding Pastor is the Rev. Dr. Cary G. Larson.

== Historical background ==
The AALC began with 12 congregations and had, as of 2008, grown to 70 congregations spread across 23 states. The AALC sees itself as a confessional Lutheran church body in the United States. At its beginning, the AALC defined itself by what it saw as maintaining a commitment to the inerrancy of Holy Scripture and the teaching of the Lutheran confessions as a correct exposition of God's Word (also known as a quia subscription).

The AALC operates its own seminary, the American Lutheran Theological Seminary, originally located in Saint Paul, Minnesota. In fall 2005, the seminary relocated to Fort Wayne, Indiana, and was then hosted by Concordia Theological Seminary of the Lutheran Church – Missouri Synod (LCMS).

The AALC holds to the inerrancy of scripture. It does not ordain women as pastors. However, women may serve as deaconesses. In addition to serving in congregations, its rostered pastors also serve as chaplains in the U.S. Armed Services, hospitals, correctional facilities, law enforcement, hospice, and a host of other specialized ministries.

Some well known confessional Lutheran theologians of the AALC include: Jordan B. Cooper, an author, conference speaker, and host of the Just and Sinner podcast and video channel; Curtis E. Leins, a professor and host of the seminary's video channel; and Chris Rosebrough, a conference speaker and host of Pirate Christian Radio and the Fighting for the Faith video channel.

== Fellowship with the Lutheran Church – Missouri Synod ==
Starting in 1989, representatives of the AALC and the Lutheran Church – Missouri Synod (LCMS) met in a series of official and unofficial talks. After six official meetings, at which various doctrinal papers were submitted, representatives of both the AALC and the LCMS recommended to their respective church bodies that they enter into altar and pulpit fellowship with one another. The proposal was brought before theology/doctrine commissions of each church body before being presented at their respective national conventions. During the June 20–23, 2007, AALC National Convention, the AALC declared fellowship with the LCMS; and voted to join the International Lutheran Council. On July 16, 2007, the LCMS declared fellowship with the AALC during the LCMS 63rd Regular Convention.

== Basic beliefs ==
- Affirms the full authority of the Bible as the inerrant and infallible Word of God
- Holds to the Lutheran Confessions because they are the true interpretation of Scripture
- Maintains a purpose focused on the Great Commission with priority for evangelism and world missions
- Affirms the authority of the local congregation as the basic unit of the church

== Presiding pastors ==
- Rev. Dr. Duane R. Lindberg 1987–1999
- Rev. Thomas V. Aadland 1999–2007
- Rev. Franklin E. Hays 2007–2014
- Rev. Dr. Curtis E. Leins 2014–2022
- Rev. Dr. Cary G. Larson 2022–
