= Altar and pulpit fellowship =

Full communion between church bodies in Lutheranism

In Lutheranism, an altar and pulpit fellowship is an ecumenical collaboration between two Christian organizations, equivalent to full communion, or communio in sacris. Altar refers to the altar in Christian churches, which holds the sacrament of Holy Communion. Pulpit refers to the pulpit, from which a pastor preaches. Altar and pulpit fellowship is therefore a specific understanding of "doctrinal agreement and confessional unity" that "allows the pastors of one church to preach and celebrate Holy Communion in the church of another".

Most European churches that arose during the Reformation are in altar and pulpit communion (full communion) through the Concord of Leuenberg, forming the Communion of Protestant Churches in Europe. The churches who signed the agreement are Lutheran, Reformed (including Presbyterian), Methodist, and United churches, and also the pre-reformation Waldensian, Czech Brethren, and Hussite church. All members also recognize the valid ordination of other churches within the Communion.

Anglican churches have full communion with Scandinavian Lutheran churches through the Porvoo Communion, and with several other churches such as Old Catholic, Mar Thoma Syrian, the Evangelical Lutheran Church in America, the Evangelical Lutheran Church of Canada, and the Philippine Independent Church.

The Lutheran Church – Missouri Synod has altar and pulpit fellowship with 42 other churches: 10 in Africa, 6 in Asia, 15 in Eurasia, 9 in Latin America, and 2 in North America. The LCMS also calls these organizations "partner churches". The American Association of Lutheran Churches says their altar and pulpit fellowship with the Missouri Synod means the two church bodies are "separate but interdependent", and that pastors of each organization may be called to permanent pastoral positions in the other.

== See also ==
- Closed communion
- Open communion
