= Malagasy Lutheran Church =

Christian church in Madagascar

- Fiangonana Loterana Malagasy
- Logo of the FLM
- Classification: Protestant
- Orientation: Lutheran
- Leader: Denis Rakotozafy
- Associations: LWF, ILC, CCCM, AACC, WCC
- Region: Madagascar
- Origin: 1950
- Congregations: 7,000 in 2023
- Members: 5,356,456 in 2023
- Ministers: 1,810
- Official website: Lutheran World

The Malagasy Lutheran Church (Malagasy: Fiangonana Loterana Malagasy, FLM; French: Église luthérienne malgache) is one of the largest Christian churches in Madagascar, established in 1950 by the unification of 1,800 Lutheran congregations in central and southern Madagascar. The oldest of these congregations was founded in the early 19th century with the arrival of missionaries from the Norwegian Missionary Society (NMS).

With almost 4 million baptized members, it is the third largest church in Madagascar and is one of the fastest growing Lutheran churches in the world. The growth is due in part to an indigenous revival movement, known as Fifohazana, that has worked through the church since the early twentieth century. Most of the church leaders are members of the Fifohazana movement.

The FLM also boasts a health care program of nine hospitals and thirteen dispensaries. SALFA, as it is known, is a community-based primary health project with special initiatives that cover child survival, family planning, and HIV/AIDS prevention.

Members of the church have also served as missionaries in Cameroon, Papua New Guinea and Thailand.

== Organization ==
The Malagasy Lutheran Church is subdivided into 25 synods including the synod of Europe, each with a president elected by local congregation representatives. The governing body of the church is elected every four years by a national gathering of over 300 representatives from the 25 synods. The governing body consists of the offices of President, Secretary General, Vice President, Vice Secretary General, and Treasurer. The presiding Bishop is the Rev. Dr. Denis Rakotozafy.

== Fifohazana movement ==
Fifohazana is a revival movement, focused on the Word of God, that has been incorporated into the Malagasy Lutheran Church. The movement was started by a Christian convert called Dada Rainisoalambo in 1894. It trains laypersons, called mpiandry (lit. "shepherds"), to proselytize and minister to non-Christians and Christians who continue to practice the traditional Malagasy religion. Throughout Madagascar, the movement has established compounds, called toby, where church activities, exorcism, counseling, and medical care are carried out.

== History ==
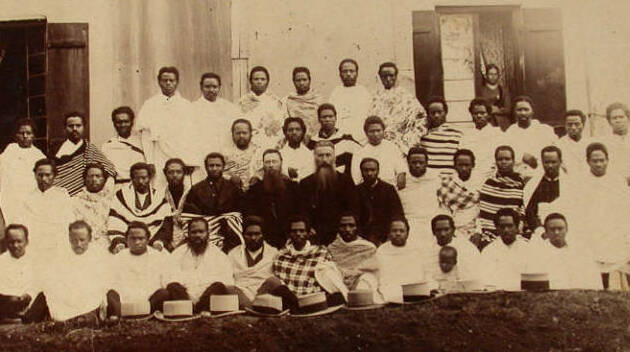
The fourth class of Malagasy seminarians at Masinandraina, in 1893

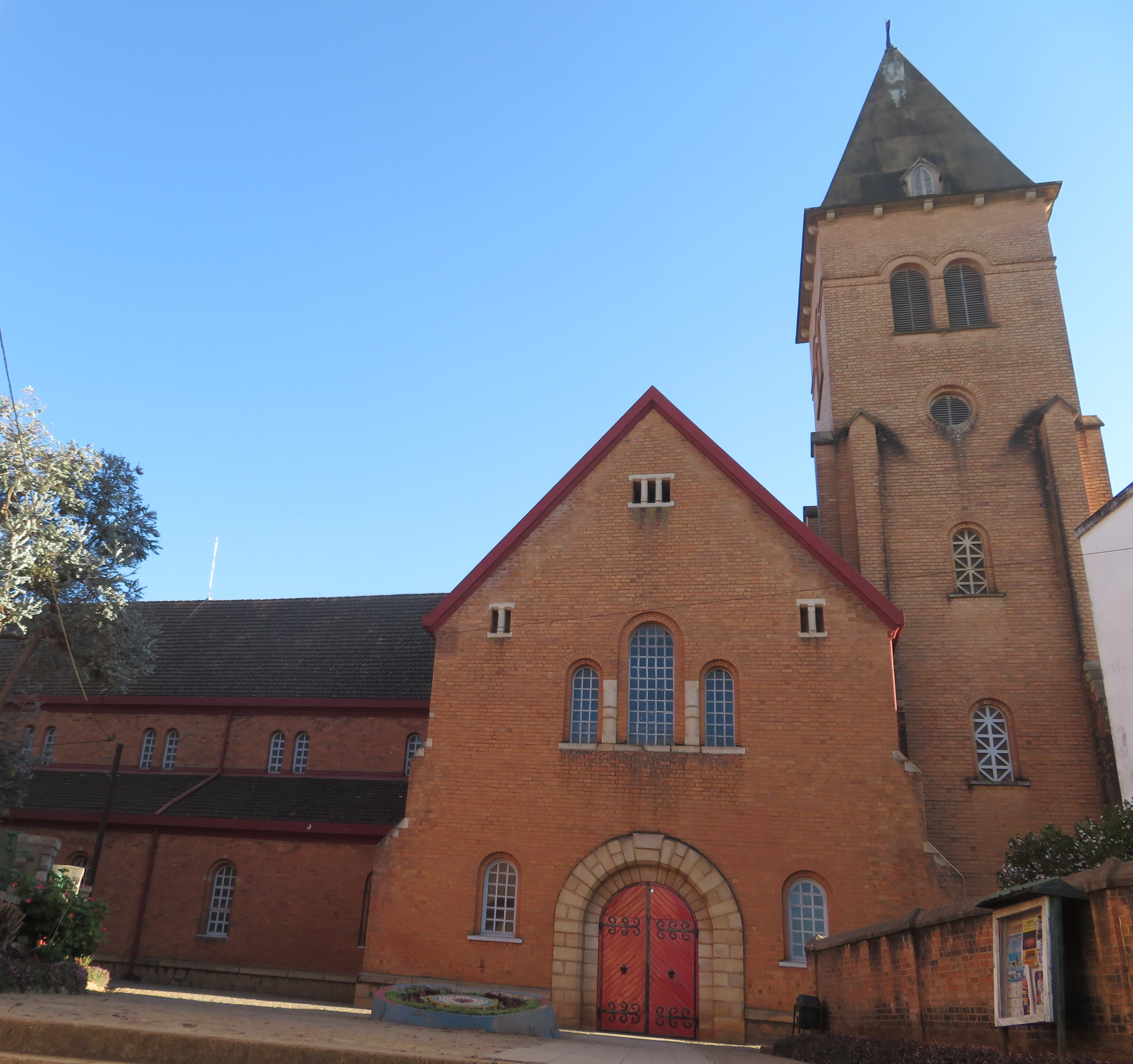
Lutheran Church, founded in 1869, in Antsirabe

Norwegian missionaries John Engh and Niels Nilsen, sent by the Norwegian Missionary Society, arrived first in Madagascar (Antananarivo) in 1866. The same year, they founded the first Lutheran church in Betafo in the south of the central region of the island. Then the American Lutheran mission began work in the southwest in 1888. The church became autonomous as one body in 1950 under the name Malagasy Lutheran Church (or FLM: Fiangonana Loterana Malagasy) and the first Malagasy pastor elected to preside to this unified church was the pastor Rakoto Andrianarijaona.

Among the first churches founded in Madagascar by the first missionaries are:

- Betafo (1867)
- Masinandraina and Antsirabe (1869)
- Loharano, Soavina Ambohimasina and Manandona (1870)
- Antananarivo Ambatovinaky et Fisakana (1871)
- Ilaka, Ambatofinandrahana and Fihasinana (1875)
- Soatanana Fianarantsoa (1876)
- Masombahoaka Fianarantsoa (1878)

At its founding the Malagasy Lutheran Church had around 18,000 members; today it has approximately 3 million and is the 9th largest church in the Lutheran World Federation (LWF). It was the first former "mission field" church to be accepted into the LWF.

The FLM opened the Lutheran Graduate School of Theology Malagasy: Sekoly Ambony Loterana momba ny Teolojia or SALT) on November 12, 1989, at Ivory Avaratra, Fianarantsoa. SALT is the successor to the former Lutheran Theological Seminar" (Malagasy: Seminery Teolojika Loterana STL) which existed at the same location. The first four women who graduated, in 1977, are Mariette Razivelo, Hélène Ralivao, Noëline Lucie Rasoanandrasana, and Esther Razafindraketaka.

== Relations with other churches ==
The Malagasy Lutheran Church joined the World Council of Churches in 1966. It is also a member of the Lutheran World Federation (LWF), All Africa Conference of Churches (AACC), Malagasy Council of Christian Churches (FFKM), and the Malagasy Council of Protestant Churches (FFPM).

The Malagasy Lutheran Church established a relationship with the Lutheran Church – Missouri Synod and also approved a vote on 25 May 2018 to "more fully realise our unity as Lutheran Christians", with the possibility of a future recognition of altar and pulpit fellowship between both churches. The church was admitted at the International Lutheran Council as a full member at their World Conference, held in Antwerp, Belgium, on 25–26 September 2018. That decision created a discussion during the following national committees of the MLC because the President approved the relationship without the official council decision.

== See also ==
- Religion in Madagascar
- Christianity in Madagascar
