= Reformed Church in Romania =

Organization of the Calvinist church in Romania

The Reformed Church in Romania
- Romániai Református Egyház (hu); Biserica Reformată din România (ro)
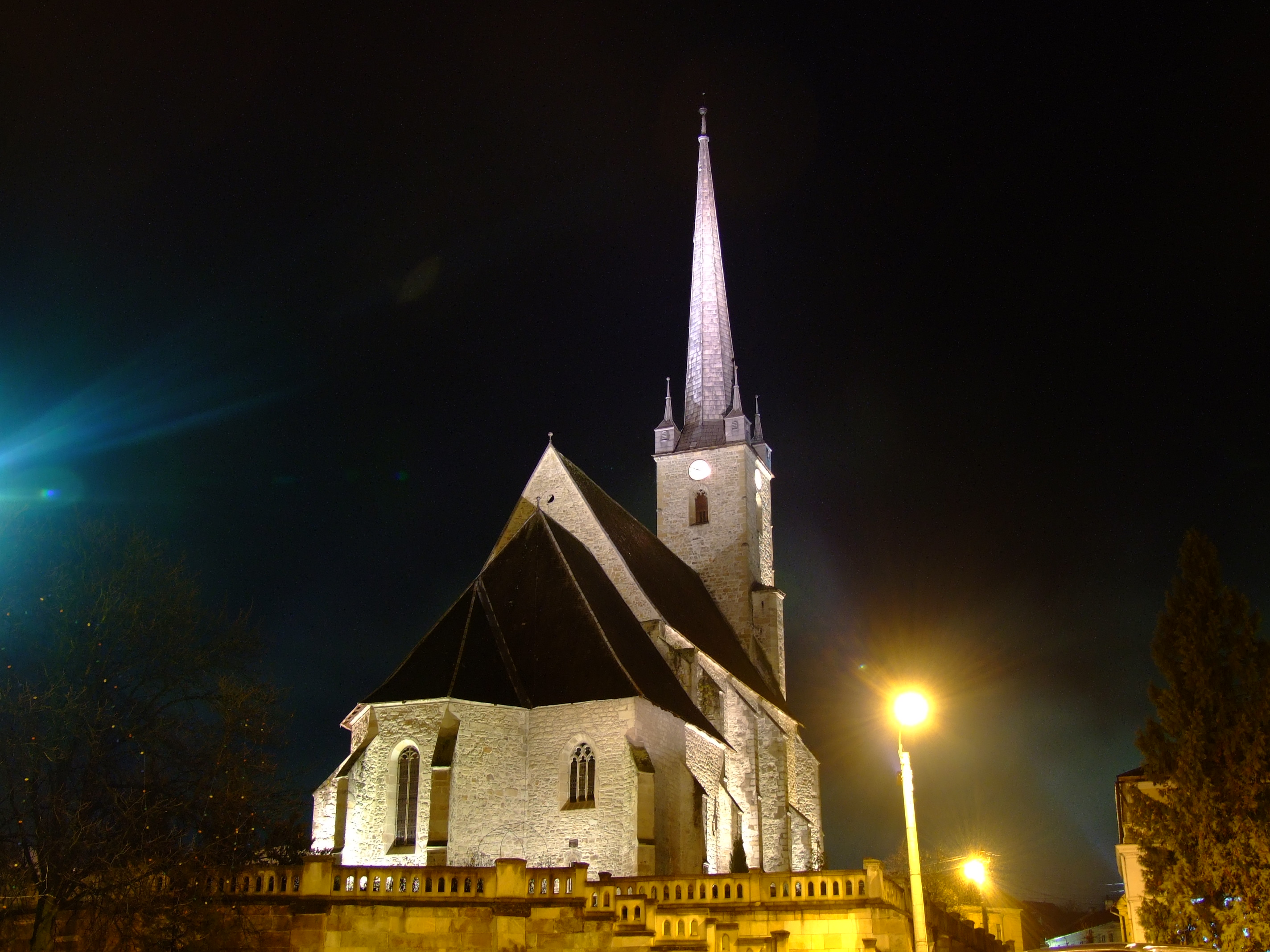
- Reformed Church in Dej
- Type: Western Christianity
- Classification: Protestant
- Orientation: Continental Reformed
- Scripture: Bible
- Theology: Reformed theology
- Polity: Quasi-Episcopal (modified Presbyterian)
- Dioceses: Diocese of Transylvania; Diocese of Királyhágómellék
- Parishes: 779
- Associations: Hungarian Reformed Communion; World Communion of Reformed Churches; Communion of Protestant Churches in Europe; Conference of European Churches; World Council of Churches
- Region: Romania
- Language: Hungarian
- Liturgy: Reformed
- Founder: John Sigismund Zápolya
- Origin: 1564
- Independence: 1920 (from Reformed Church in Hungary)
- Separated from: Roman Catholic Church
- Members: 495,380 (2021)
- Presbyters: 809
- Places of worship: 1,352
- Tertiary institutions: Protestant Theological Institute of Cluj, Babeș-Bolyai University
- Publications: Református Szemle; Üzenet; Igehirdető; Református Család; Értesitő; Harangszó; Partiumi Közlöny
- Official website: reformatus.ro kiralyhagomellek.ro

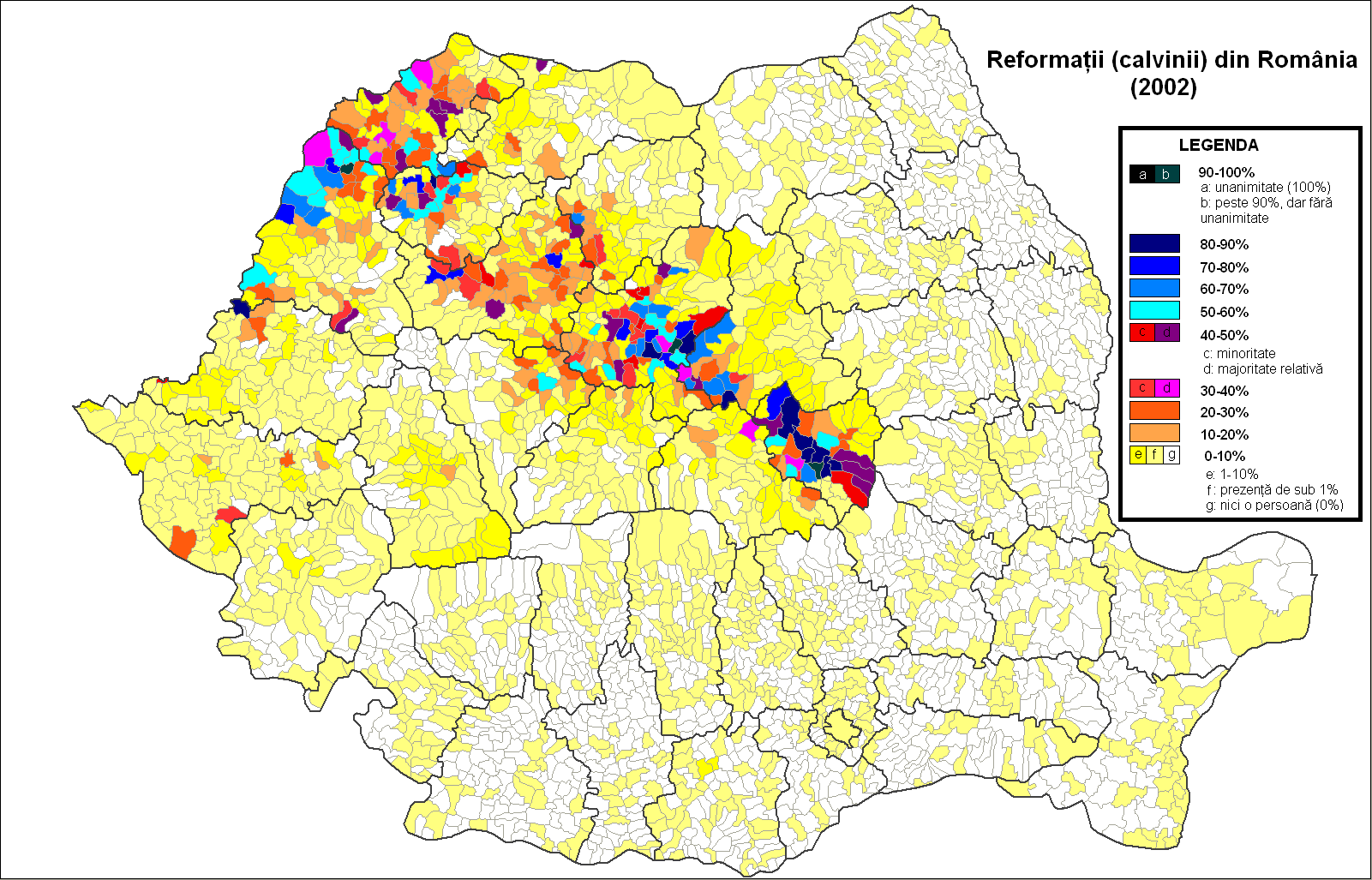
Distribution of Reformed adherents in Romania (2002 census)

The Reformed Church in Romania (Hungarian: Romániai Református Egyház; Romanian: Biserica Reformată din România) is a Calvinist denomination and the largest Protestant church in Romania. The majority of its followers are of Hungarian ethnicity and Hungarian is the main church language. The large majority of the Church's parishes are in Transylvania; according to the 2021 census, 495,380 people or 2.6% of the total population belong to the Reformed Church. About 95% of the members were of Hungarian ethnicity.

The religious institution is composed of two bishoprics, the Reformed Diocese of Királyhágómellék and the Reformed Diocese of Transylvania. The headquarters are at Oradea and Cluj-Napoca, respectively.

Together with the Unitarian Church of Transylvania and the two Lutheran churches of Romania (the Evangelical Lutheran Church in Romania and the Evangelical Church of Augustan Confession), the Calvinist community runs the Protestant Theological Institute of Cluj.

== Doctrine ==
The church adheres to the:

=== Creeds ===
- Apostle Creed
- Nicene Creed
- Athanasian Creed

=== Confessions ===
- Heidelberg Catechism
- Second Helvetic Confession

== Gallery ==
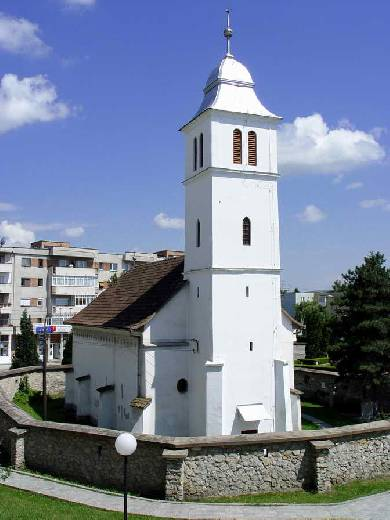
Câmpia Turzii

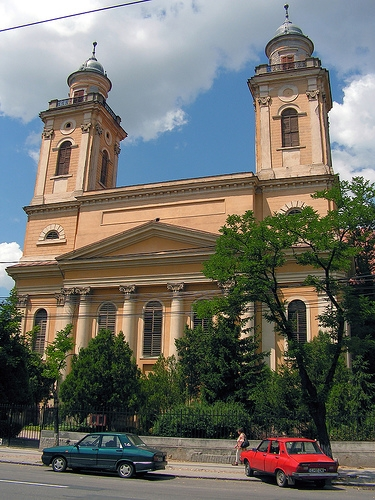
Church with Two Towers, Cluj-Napoca

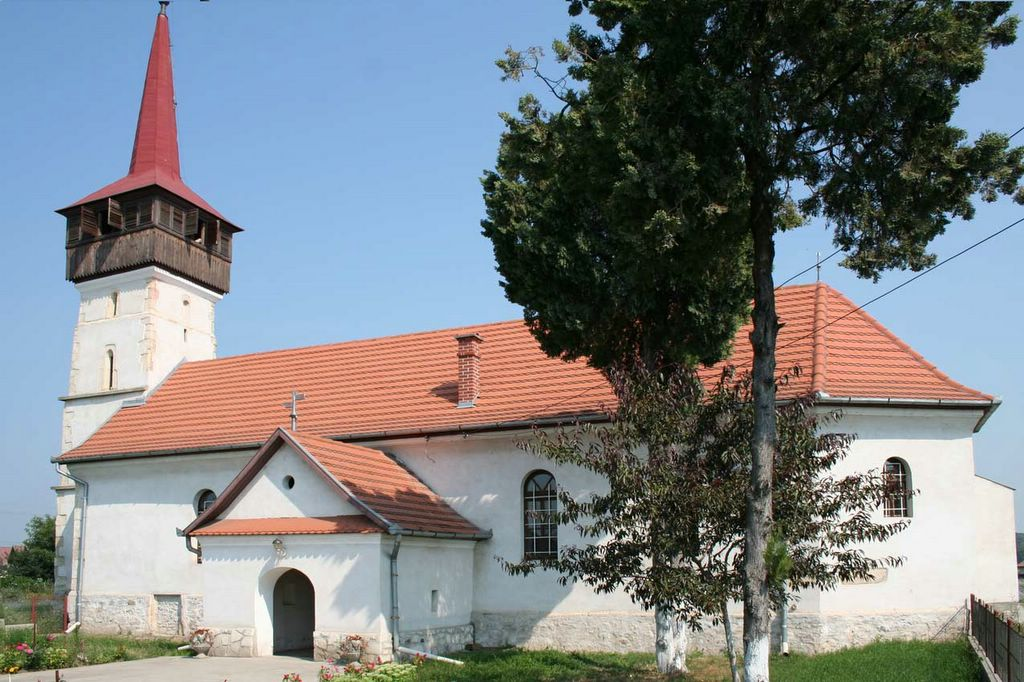
Turda-Poiana

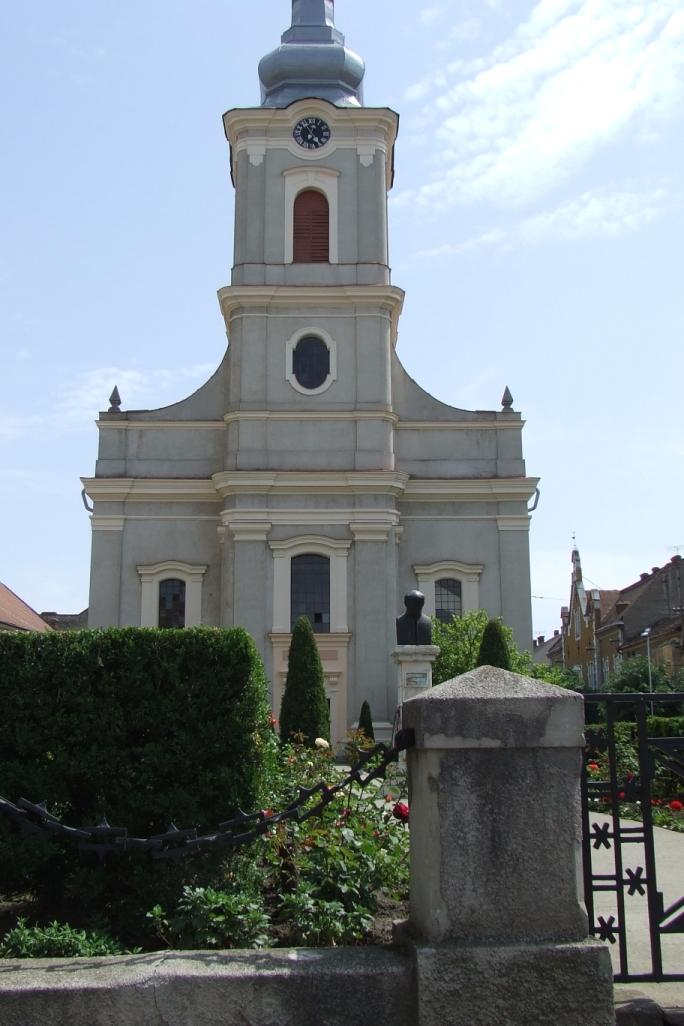
Satu Mare Church with the Chains

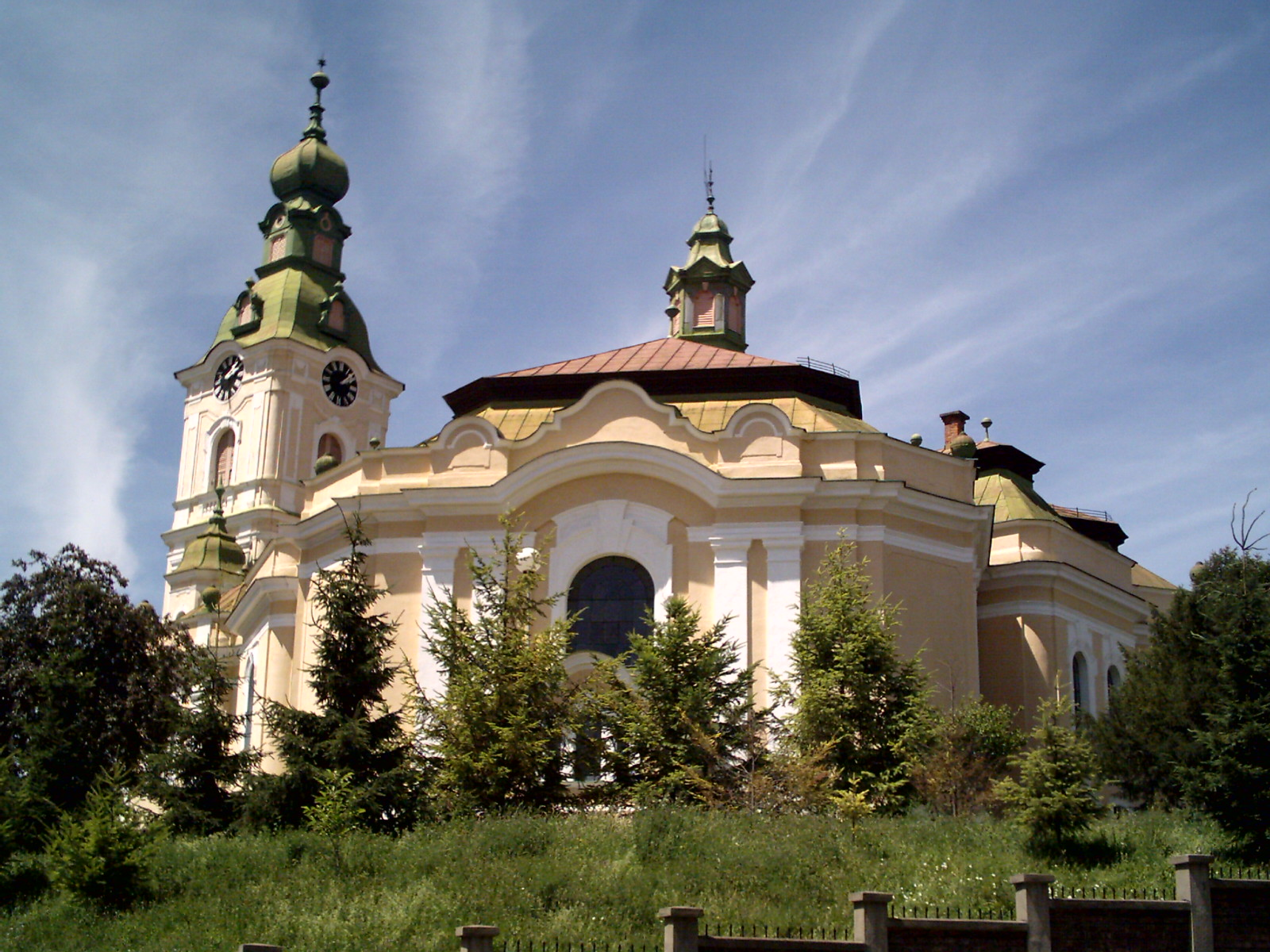
Zalău (1904–07)
