= Protestant Theological Institute of Cluj =

Seminary and private university in Romania

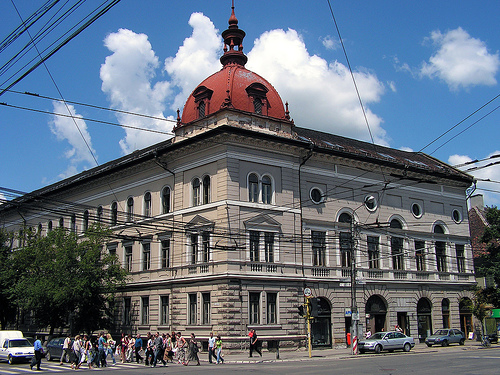
- Type: Private
- Established: 1948
- Religious affiliation: • Evangelical Church A.C.; • Evangelical Lutheran Church; • Reformed Church; • Unitarian Church of Transylvania
- Rector: Tamás Juhász
- Academic staff: 24
- Students: 188
- Location: Cluj-Napoca, Romania
- Website: proteo.hu

The Protestant Theological Institute (Romanian: Institutul Teologic Protestant; Hungarian: Protestáns Teológiai Intézet; German: Protestantisch-Theologisches Institut) is a Protestant seminary and private university in Cluj-Napoca, Romania. The state-recognized institution trains ministers for four separate Protestant denominations: Calvinism (the Reformed Church in Romania), Lutheranism (the majority-Hungarian Evangelical Lutheran Church, the majority-Saxon Evangelical Church of the Augsburg Confession), and Unitarianism (the Unitarian Church of Transylvania).

The Protestant Institute is coordinated by five bishoprics: one Unitarian and two Lutheran, together with the Reformed Diocese of Királyhágómellék and the Reformed Diocese of Transylvania. Its Cluj-Napoca center houses two branches — the Reformed-Evangelical Faculty (offering training for members of the Reformed Church and the Evangelical Lutheran Church), and the Unitarian Faculty. In addition to these, the Institute includes a Saxon-Evangelical Faculty, which is based in Sibiu and is maintained by the Evangelical Church of Augustan Confession.

The institute was founded in 1948, uniting the Cluj-based Reformed Theological College and the Unitarian Theological Academy as two faculties, as well as being the first local seminary for Lutherans. It has a claim to being the sole Protestant theological institution to teach in two languages (Hungarian and German) and to have two separate local sections.

== Other schools ==
- The Unitarian Church of Transylvania also maintains separately the John Sigismund Unitarian Academy or Unitarian Gymnasium in Cluj-Napoca (founded 1554).
