= Cluj-Napoca Evangelical Church =

Coordinates: 46°46′16″N 23°35′24″E

Evangelical-Lutheran Church
- Evangélikus-Lutheránus Egyházközség (Hungarian); Biserica Evanghelică Luterană (Romanian)
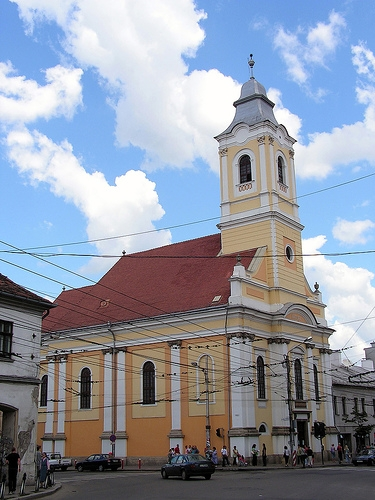
- Evangelical-Lutheran Church
- Location: 21st December 1989 Boulevard nr. 1, Cluj-Napoca
- Country: Romania
- Denomination: Evangelical Lutheran Church
- Previous denomination: Evangelical Church of the Augsburg Confession

History
- Consecrated: 29 November 1829

Architecture
- Architect: Georg Winkler
- Style: Baroque
- Groundbreaking: 1816
- Completed: 1829

Administration
- Diocese: Diocese of Cluj

The Evangelical Church is a place of worship for the Evangelical Lutheran Church in Cluj-Napoca, Romania. It was built between 1816 and 1829, following plans drawn by the architect Georg Winkler. The church is 33.8 m in length and 18 m in width, with a 43 m tower, marked with the inscription PIETATI. The sanctuary was decorated by Johann Gentiluomo, and, in 1913, the church received a pipe organ, built in Ludwigsburg.

== Current Pastors ==
Adorjani Dezső Zoltán (bishop), Fehér Attila (counselor), Fehér Olivér (trainee), Kerékgyártó Imola Orsoly (trainee).
