= Episcopalianism in Scotland =

Episcopalianism in Scotland may refer to:

- Episcopalianism in the Church of Scotland
- Scottish Episcopal Church
