= Bishops in the Church of Scotland =

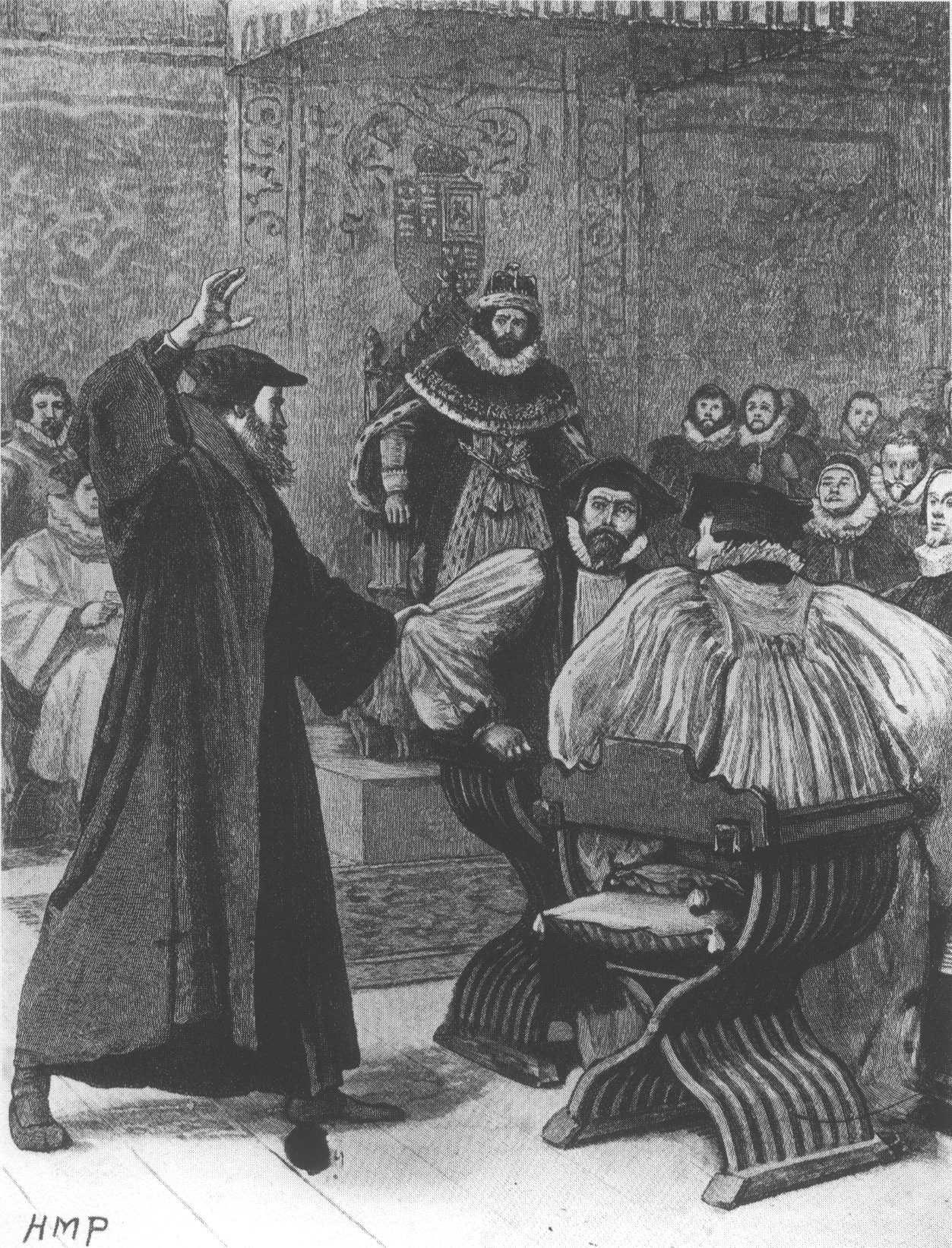
Victorian depiction of Andrew Melville challenging bishops at the court of James VI

There have not been bishops in the Church of Scotland since the Restoration Episcopacy of the 17th century, although there have occasionally been attempts to reintroduce episcopalianism.

Like most Reformed Churches, the Church of Scotland has a presbyterian structure which invests in a hierarchy of courts, that authority which other denominations give to bishops. Nevertheless, the Church of Scotland does have the concept of a bishop, and there has been debate about widening this concept.

== Historical background ==
Arms of the Diocese of Edinburgh, formed in 1633

The word bishop is derived from the Greek word episcopos, meaning "overseer". The word is used in the New Testament, but the exact function of this office is not specific in the Early Church. By the third century, however, both the Eastern (Orthodox) and Western (Catholic) Church adopted a system of bishops as their spiritual rulers.

After the Reformation, the Lutheran and Anglican traditions retained the episcopal system. However, most of the churches of the radical reformation rejected the role of bishops, thinking that concentration of power in few individuals is the root of corruption in the pre-Reformation Church. Calvinism in other places has accommodated bishops and during the Scottish Reformation, the reformer John Knox initially wanted the appointment of bishops in the Church of Scotland. But ultimately, the church preferred the transparency of the Presbyterian system, where all decisions are made in public meetings.

During parts of the 17th century there were conflicts between the Presbyterian and Episcopalian tendencies in the Kirk (see Bishops' Wars), with Episcopalianism (patronised by the monarch) sometimes in the ascendancy. Presbyterianians finally gained the upper hand, leading to the establishment of a separate Episcopal Church of Scotland in 1690.

For a list of the 17th-century Church of Scotland bishops, see Bishop of Edinburgh, Archbishop of Glasgow and Bishop of Aberdeen.

=== Historical recognition of episcopal ordination ===
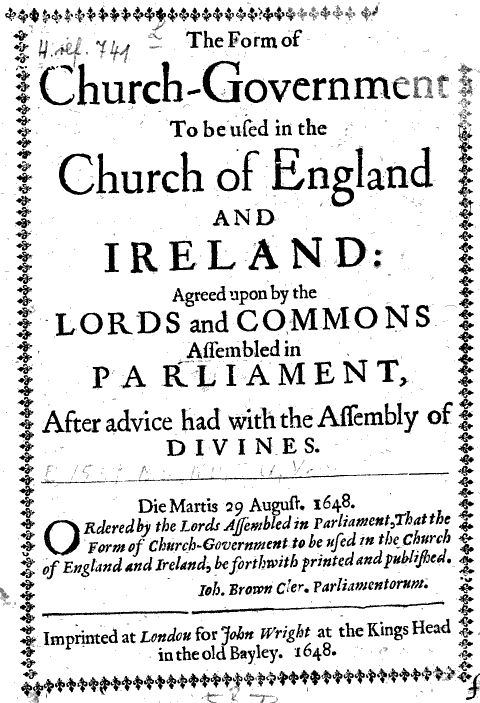
Form of Presbyterial Church Government

On 10 February 1645 the General Assembly of the Kirk of Scotland approved a document produced by the Westminster Divines outlining the nature of Presbyterian governance. This document, The Form of Presbyterial Church Government, did not include bishops within its recognition of church officers, listing the valid offices thusly:

The officers which Christ hath appointed for the edification of his church, and the perfecting of the saints, are, some-extraordinary, as apostles, evangelists, and prophets, which are ceased. Others ordinary and perpetual, as pastors, teachers and other church-governors and deacons.

However, this lack of recognition for an office of episcopate distinct from that of a presbyter did not entail a rejection of the validity of ordinations by the Anglican bishops of the Church of England. This allowed for former ministers of the English church to be received into service of the Church of Scotland, following suitable examination, without reordination.

If a minister be designed to a congregation, who hath been formerly ordained presbyter according to the form of ordination which hath been in the church of England, which we hold for substance to be valid, and not to be disclaimed by any who have received it; then, there being a cautious proceeding in matters of examination, let him be admitted without any new ordination.

== Use of the term "bishop" in the Church of Scotland today ==
Although the Church of Scotland had no bishops after 1690, the term "bishop" is found in the Bible and the church does retain the word in its basic sense of "one who has oversight". Specifically, a minister who is placed in charge of a person training for the ministry is referred to as the student's bishop. This term is used in the context of theology students doing "student attachments" (work-experience placements) in parishes and later of graduates who must complete a probationary year in a parish prior to ordination. Most lay people in the Church of Scotland, however, would be unaware of this usage.

== Proposals to reintroduce episcopacy ==
In the latter part of the 20th century, there were a number of moves to reopen the debate on episcopacy. Presbyteries may be more transparent than bishops in their wielding of power, but they have often proved rather less good at the pastoral care of parish ministers, a problem with which the Church has frequently wrestled. One proposed solution, under the catchphrase "incorporating episcopacy into our system", was for presbyteries to appoint full-time or part-time bishops to minister to the ministers on the presbyteries' behalf. These bishops would not have the power of bishops in other traditions, but would have analogous pastoral functions. Precedents for such a "mixed system" were to be found in the Uniting Church in Australia and elsewhere.

The most serious presentation of such proposals came in the 1980s when a union between the Church of Scotland and the Scottish Episcopal Church was attempted. A precondition from the Episcopalian side was that the united church should have a form of episcopacy recognisable to their tradition. Negotiations for the proposed union were almost completed, and were ratified by the General Assembly, but were voted down by the Church of Scotland's presbyteries when referred to them under the Barrier Act.

In the 1990s, the Scottish Churches Initiative for Union (SCIFU) aimed to unite the Church of Scotland, Scottish Episcopal Church, the Methodist Church (in Scotland) and the Congregational Union of Scotland by 2010. An element of the proposed structure was again a form of episcopal oversight, whilst retaining elders from the Presbyterian system. After considerable debate, the SCIFU proposals were rejected by the General Assembly of the Church of Scotland in May 2003.

The proposed structure of the post-union Scottish church was described by Albert H. Lee as:

At the heart of the proposal is the 'Maxi Parish' in which worshipping communities would work together under one leadership body and be grouped together in Regions, with the office of Bishop and a 'Regional Council' to carry out the responsibilities at this level.

== Modern declarations ==
In the 21st century, the Church of Scotland has made two declarations between itself and the Church of England and the Scottish Episcopal Church respectively in which the issue of oversight, episkope was recognised but not resolved into a common polity.

=== St Columba Declaration ===
The St Columba Declaration was written in 2015, by the work of the Church of England – Church of Scotland Joint Study Group, in the aftermath of the "No" vote in the 2014 Scottish independence referendum and building upon the 2010 report Our Fellowship in the Gospel.

=== St Andrew Declaration ===
The St Andrew Declaration emerged from the work of Our Common Calling Working Group of the Church of Scotland and the Scottish Episcopal Church and was approved by the General Assembly of the Church of Scotland in May 2021 and by the General Synod of the Scottish Episcopal Church in June 2021. Signed on 30 November 2021, this declaration is very similar in wording to the St Columba Declaration, from which the Scottish Episcopal Church was excluded, causing grave offence.

=== Comparison of the declarations ===
Acknowledgements
St Columba	St Andrew
We acknowledge one another's churches as churches belonging to the One, Holy, Catholic and Apostolic Church of Jesus Christ and truly participating in the apostolic ministry and mission of the whole people of God.	We acknowledge one another's churches as churches belonging to the One, Holy, Catholic and Apostolic Church of Jesus Christ and truly participating in the apostolic mission of the whole people of God.
	We acknowledge that our churches share in the common confession of the Apostolic Faith.
We acknowledge that in both our churches the word of God is truly preached, and the sacraments of Baptism and the Holy Communion are rightly administered.	We acknowledge that in our churches the Word of God is authentically preached, and the sacraments of Baptism and the Holy Communion are faithfully administered
We acknowledge that both our churches share in the common confession of the apostolic faith.	
We acknowledge that one another's ordained ministries of word and sacraments are given by God as instruments of grace and we look forward to a time when growth in communion can be expressed in fuller unity that makes possible the interchangeability of ministers.	We acknowledge one another's ordained ministries as possessing not only the inward call of the Spirit but also Christ's commission through the Church and are given by God as instruments of grace for the mission and unity of the Church.
We acknowledge that personal, collegial and communal oversight (episkope) is embodied and exercised in our churches in a variety of forms, as a visible sign expressing and serving the Church's unity and continuity in apostolic life, mission and ministry.	We acknowledge that personal, collegial and communal oversight (episkope) is embodied and exercised in our churches in a variety of forms, as a visible sign expressing and serving the Church's unity and continuity in apostolic life, ministry and mission.
	We acknowledge that our unity is as yet imperfect and look forward to the time when the fuller visible unity of our churches may be realised.

Commitments
St Columba	St Andrew
pray for and with one another;	To pray for and with one another; to work towards the fuller sharing of ministry, and of spiritual, human, financial and physical resources
	To encourage, affirm and support local expressions of our common calling within the life of the Church as it participates in the mission of God, and to explore opportunities for new partnerships in the communities in which we serve;
welcome one another's members to each other's worship as guests and receive one another's members into the congregational life of each other's churches where that is their desire;	To welcome one another's members to worship and participate in the congregational life of each other's churches;
explore opportunities for congregational partnership, formal as well as informal, in those cases where there are churches in close geographical proximity;	
enable ordained ministers from one of our churches to exercise ministry in the other church, in accordance with the discipline of each church;	
identify theological issues that arise from growth towards fuller communion and be prepared to allocate resources to addressing them;	To stimulate theological discussions between our churches, including on the outstanding issues hindering fuller communion;

== See also ==
- Five Articles of Perth
- The Killing Time
- Tulchan
