= Diocese of Oradea =

Diocese of Oradea may refer to one of several dioceses in Oradea, Romania:

- Roman Catholic Diocese of Oradea Mare
- Greek Catholic Diocese of Oradea Mare
- Reformed Diocese of Királyhágómellék, sometimes referred to as the Reformed Diocese of Oradea
- Romanian Orthodox Diocese of Oradea (see Episcopia Ortodoxă Română a Oradiei)
