= Reformed Church, Câmpia Turzii =

Heritage site in Cluj County, Romania

Coordinates: 46°32′43″N 23°53′11″E

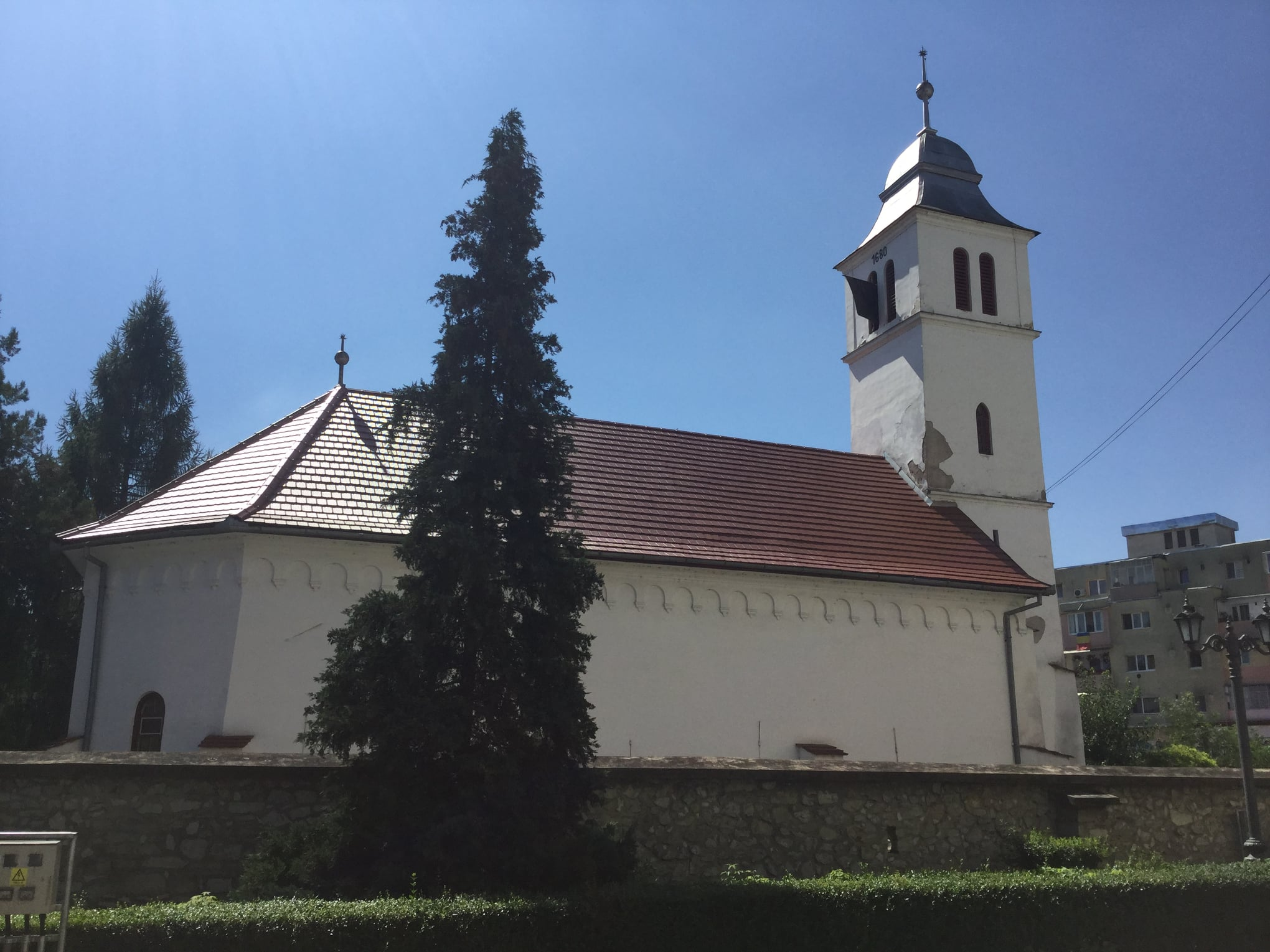
Reformed Church in Câmpia Turzii

The Reformed Church in Câmpia Turzii, Romania, is located on Piața Mihai Viteazul in the city center. It is part of the Reformed Church in Romania, largely made up of ethnic Hungarians.

The church is believed to have been built on the site of an earlier medieval church. According to the inscription on the plaque next to the pulpit, its foundation stone was laid on May 30, 1679, and its construction was completed in 1680. It was funded through the last will of Count Francis Rhédey, and is the city’s oldest building. The interior was redesigned and the ceiling repaired in 1786. In 1944, fighting during World War II caused serious damage, which was repaired in 1946.

The church remains in good condition. It was once surrounded by a castle wall, but this was largely demolished by 1871, when historian Balázs Orbán wrote on the subject. However, there is a stone wall around the church, around 2.5 meters high. The grounds are entered through a gate structure on the east side.

The church is listed as a historic monument by Romania's Ministry of Culture and Religious Affairs.
