= Reformed Diocese of Transylvania =

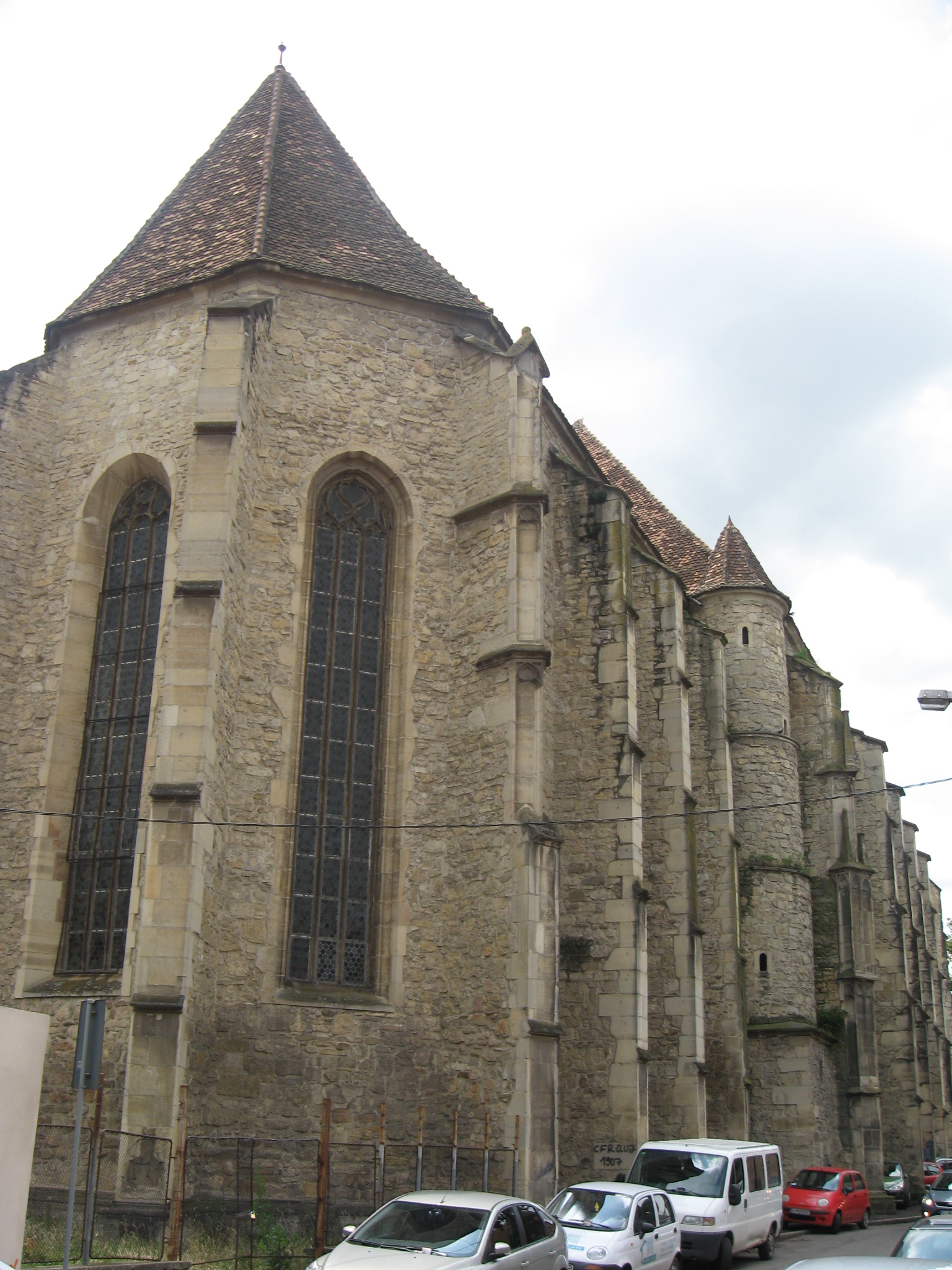
- Reformed Church in Cluj-Napoca
- Classification: Protestant
- Orientation: moderate Calvinist
- Theology: Reformed Evangelical
- Polity: Episcopal
- Leader: Bishop Béla Kató
- Associations: World Communion of Reformed Churches, World Council of Churches
- Region: Transylvania, Bucharest and parts of the remnants of Romania
- Headquarters: Cluj-Napoca
- Origin: 1564; Transylvania
- Branched from: Reformed Church in Hungary
- Congregations: 1,100
- Members: 500 000

The Reformed Diocese of Transylvania (Hungarian: Erdélyi Református Egyházkerület; Romanian: Episcopia Reformată din Ardeal) is a moderately conservative Reformed, Calvinist church in Romania; its seat is in Cluj-Napoca. Alongside the Reformed Diocese of Királyhágómellék, which has its seat in Oradea, it forms the Reformed Church in Romania.

== History ==
The Reformation took roots in Transylvania in the 1550s. Among the Hungarian-speaking population, the Calvinist branch was the dominant religion. In 1564, in the Synod of Nagyenyed (Aiud), the Calvinists and the Lutherans separated. This is the formation date of the Transylvanian Reformed Church, which formed part of the Reformed Church in Hungary and officially adopted the Heidelberg Catechism. At the end of the 16th century, the Reformed Church became the dominant church in the Duchy of Transylvania.

The church has schools in Deva, Târgu Mureș, Aiud, Alba Iulia, Făgăraș and Târgu Secuiesc.

The dukes of Transylvania belonged to the Reformed Church. The church developed steadily, not interrupted by the Counter-Reformation. The dukes protected the Protestant churches.

From 1605 the Reformed church held Synods annually. During the period of Gabor Bethlen, many theological schools were formed. When Transylvania became a Habsburg province, freedom of religion was permitted, and during this time the Reformed nobles protected Calvinism.

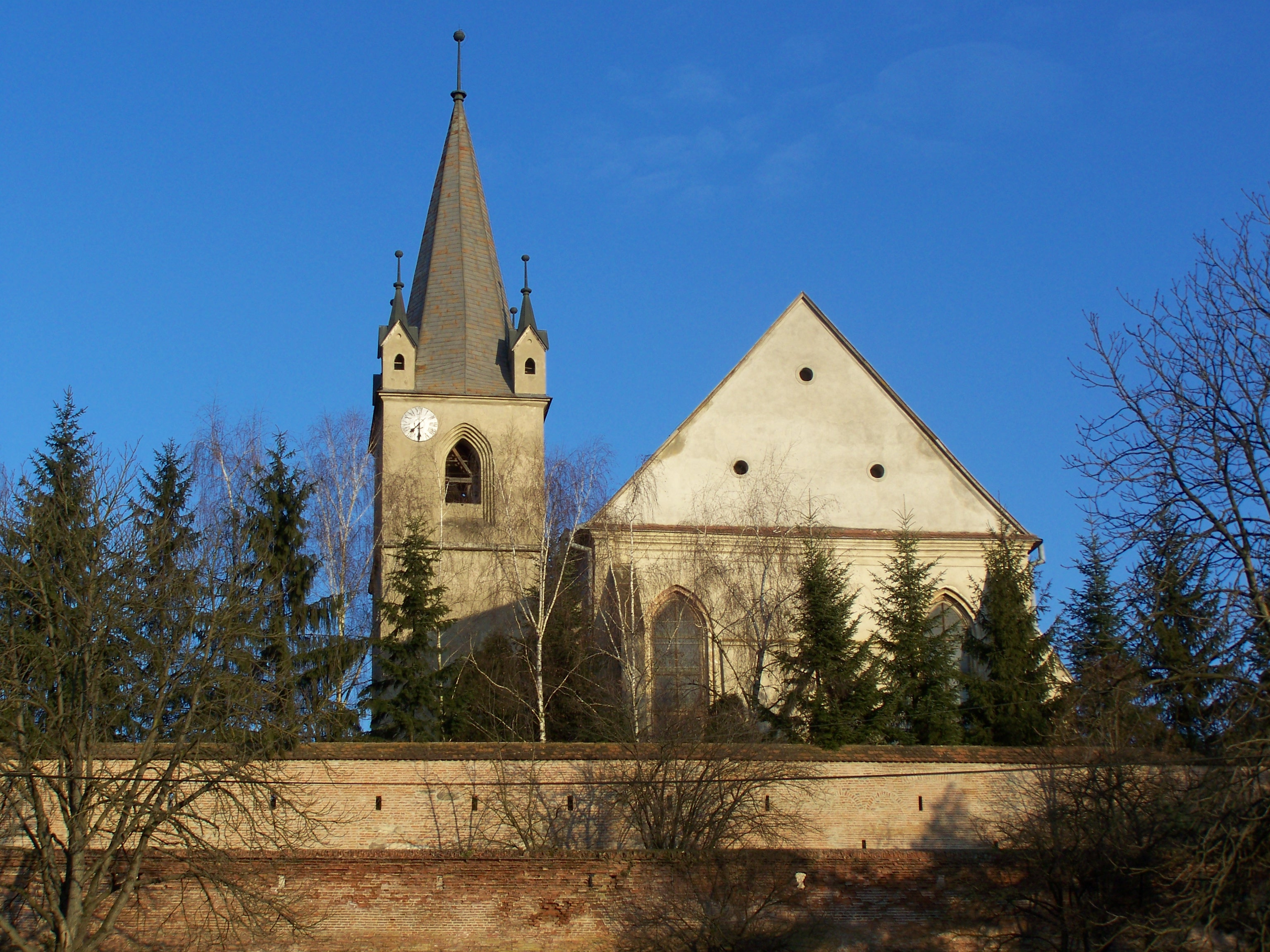
Reformed Fortress Church in Targu Mures

The Reformed Diocese of Transylvania has official connections with the Swiss, Dutch and German Calvinists.

After World War I, Transylvania united with Romania.

From 1940 to 1944, Hungary held Northern Transylvania, before Romania retook the area at the end of World War II. During the Communist period, the church faced hardships. In 1989, with the fall of the regime, the situation changed: parishes were rebuilt, theological schools reopened and dozens of new congregations were formed.

== Theology ==
- Apostles' Creed
- Heidelberg Catechism
- Second Helvetic Confession

== Statistics ==
In 2001, the church had 376,000 members, organized into 1091 parishes.

The highest rate of Reformed faith in Transylvania is in Judetul Mures (Maros megye), where the Reformed church had 157,000 members, approximately 31% of the total population. Followed by Judetul covasna (Kovászna megye in Hungarian) with 75,000 Reformed, approximately 33% of the total population.

== Governance ==
The church has 16 presbyteries (egyházmegye – in Hungarian), at Brașov, Dej, Căpeni, Reghin, Petroşani, Huedin, Târgu Secuiesc, Cluj-Napoca (two), Fântânele, Târgu Mureș (two), Aiud, Sfântu Gheorghe, Cristuru Secuiesc and Turda. The church is governed by a bishop, a similar church government to the Hungarian Reformed Church. From 2000-2012 the bishop was Géza Pap; currently it is Béla Kató. The leader of the presbyteries are the dens, the head of the districts or synods are the bishops. The Romanian Reformed Church's highest decision making institution is the General Assembly, the chairmen are the bishop and the main janitor (gondnok in Hungarian) The two dioceses, the Transylvanian and the Kiralyhágómellék ones, have separate bishops and janitors; in the General Assembly, they enjoy equal rights.

== Life of the church ==
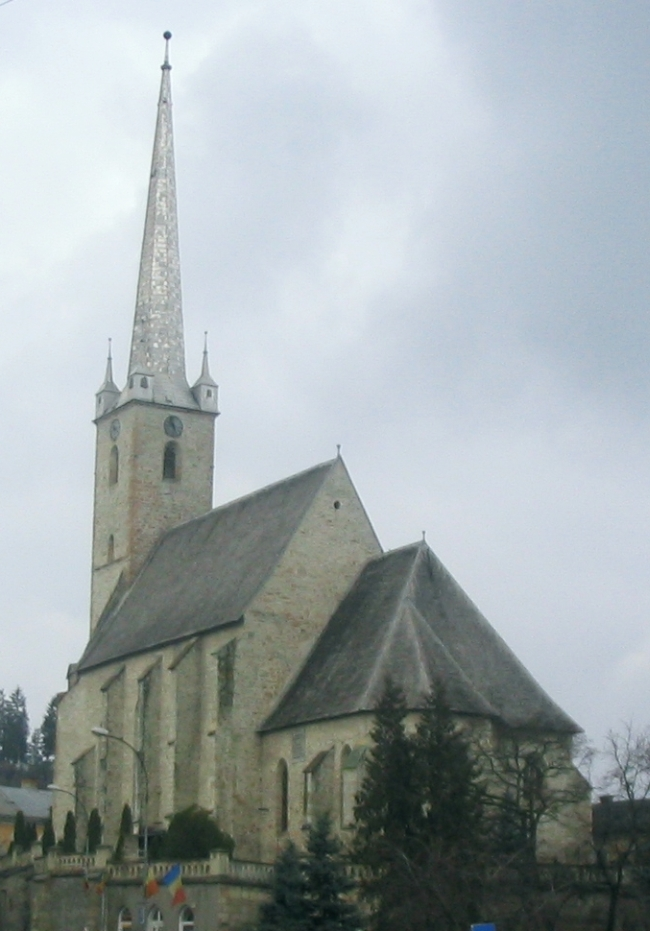
Reformed Church in Dej

The church uses the same liturgy as the Reformed Church in Hungary, but the language is slightly archaic, and regional differences may be present. In practice, the Reformed Diocese of Transylvania and the Reformed Diocese of Királyhágómellék have some differences, but these are not significant. At the end of worship services, the Reformed community always sings the Hungarian national anthem. Communion is performed during Advent, Christmas, Easter, Good Friday and Pentecost.

Alongside the early creeds, the Heidelberg Catechism and the Second Helvetic Confession, John Calvin's Institution and Les Ordonances [sic] (about church government) are widely used.

In the church men and women sit separately; the youth and those were not yet married sit in the choir as a rule. Romanian-language worship services are held in Bucharest; in Transylvania, Hungarian is the language of worship. In Cluj-Napoca, English-language worship is available, translated from Hungarian.

== Education ==
The Reformed Church in Romania maintains the Romanian Reformed Pedagogic Institute in Cluj-Napoca. It was founded in 1997. Common Institutes with the Királyhágómellék Reformed Church Distinct are the Protestant Theological Institute, the Romanian Pedagogic Institute, the Reformed Churches Retired Foundation.

== Interchurch organisations ==
- member of the World Communion of Reformed Churches and the World Council of Churches. The denomination has partnership relations with the Church of Scotland, Polish Reformed Church and the Presbyterian Church in Canada.
