= Barrier Act =

In the ecclesiastical law of the Church of Scotland, the Barrier Act of 1697 is a measure which compels the General Assembly to consult the wider Church before innovating in the areas of worship, doctrine, discipline or church government.

It is a provision which prevents the General Assembly from making core innovations which might profoundly affect the polity of the church without first referring these to the presbyteries. A matter which falls under the Barrier Act must first be passed by the General Assembly, then be referred in the form of an overture to the presbyteries and ratified by a majority of these, before being returned to the General Assembly of the following year and passed again there. This is intended to prevent rash decisions to the long-term detriment of the church. Important matters which fell under the Barrier Act in recent years include the ordination of women, which was passed in the 1960s, and the proposed union with the Scottish Episcopal Church, which failed to receive the support of the presbyteries in the 1980s.
