= Tulchan =

A Scottish man appointed as bishop after the Reformation

A Tulchan (from the Scottish Gaelic, tulachan) was in Scotland a man appointed as bishop after the Reformation, who was a bishop in name only and whose revenue was drawn by his patron. The term originally referred to a calfskin stuffed with straw and presented to a cow, as if living, to induce her to give milk. The epithet Tulchan applied to the bishops is usually ascribed to the reformer and collector of Scottish proverbs David Fergusson.

Mr. Gladstone, during his electioneering raid into Midlothian in November 1879, explained the meaning of "tulchan", which he spelt "tulcan":

"My noble friend, Lord Rosebery, speaking to me of the law of hypothec, said that the bill of Mr. Vans Agnew on hypothec is a Tulcan Bill. A tulcan, I believe, is the figure of a calf stuffed with straw, and it is, you know, an old Scottish custom among farmers to place the tulcan calf under a cow to induce her to give milk."

Jamieson writes the word "tulchane", and cites the phrase, "a tulchane bishop", as the designation of one who received the episcopate on condition of signing the temporalities to a secular person. One of them, Robert Montgomery (before 1550–1609), was prosecuted by the religious reformer Andrew Melville (1545–1622). In some parts of Scotland, the people say a "tourkin calf" instead of a "tulcan calf". Jamieson further states:

"A tourkin calf, or lamb, is one that wears a skin not its own. A tourkin lamb is one taken from its dam, and given to another ewe which has lost her own. In this case, the shepherd takes the skin of the dead lamb, and puts it on the back of the living one, and thus so deceives the ewe that she allows the stranger to suck".

In other words, a "tulchan" can also be a living animal, and the usage is of one who gains profit by pretending to be someone, or something else.

== See also ==
- Bishops in the Church of Scotland
- Midlothian campaign
