= Evangelical Lutheran Church of Romania =

Lutheran denomination in Romania

- Romániai Evangélikus-Lutheránus Egyház (hu); Biserica Evanghelică-Luterană din România (ro)
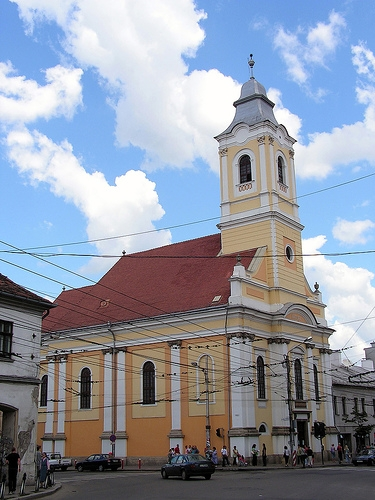
- Cluj-Napoca Evangelical Church
- Type: Western Christianity
- Classification: Protestant
- Orientation: Lutheranism
- Scripture: Bible
- Theology: Lutheran theology
- Polity: Quasi-Episcopal
- Bishop: Adorjáni Dezső
- Parishes: 39
- Associations: Lutheran World Federation; Communion of Protestant Churches in Europe; Conference of European Churches; World Council of Churches
- Region: Romania
- Language: Hungarian, Slovak, Romanian, German
- Headquarters: Bd. 21 Decembrie 1989 nr.1, Cluj-Napoca
- Origin: 4 July 1920
- Recognition: 1948 (by the state)
- Separated from: German Lutheran Church of Transylvania (hungarian-speaking congregations); Lutheran Church in Hungary (congregations from Crișana)
- Members: 20,168 (2011)
- Priests: 46
- Places of worship: 47
- Tertiary institutions: Protestant Theological Institute of Cluj
- Publications: Evangélikus Harangszó; Református Szemle
- Official website: evangelikus.ro

The Evangelical Lutheran Church of Romania (Romanian: Biserica Evanghelică-Luterană din România; Hungarian: Romániai Evangélikus-Lutheránus Egyház; German: Evangelisch-Lutherische Kirche in Rumänien) is a Lutheran denomination in Romania. Many active congregations were founded over 450 years ago, and today the Church has 27,540 members. It is primarily a Hungarian-speaking denomination, with one deanery for Slovak-speaking parishes. It is one of Romania's nineteen officially recognised religious denominations.

This church is not to be confused with the mainly Saxon, German-speaking Evangelical Church of the Augsburg Confession.
