= Evangelical Church of the Augsburg Confession in Romania =

Lutheran church in Romania

- Evangelische Kirche Augsburgischen Bekenntnisses in Rumänien (de); Biserica Evanghelică de Confesiune Augustană în România (ro)
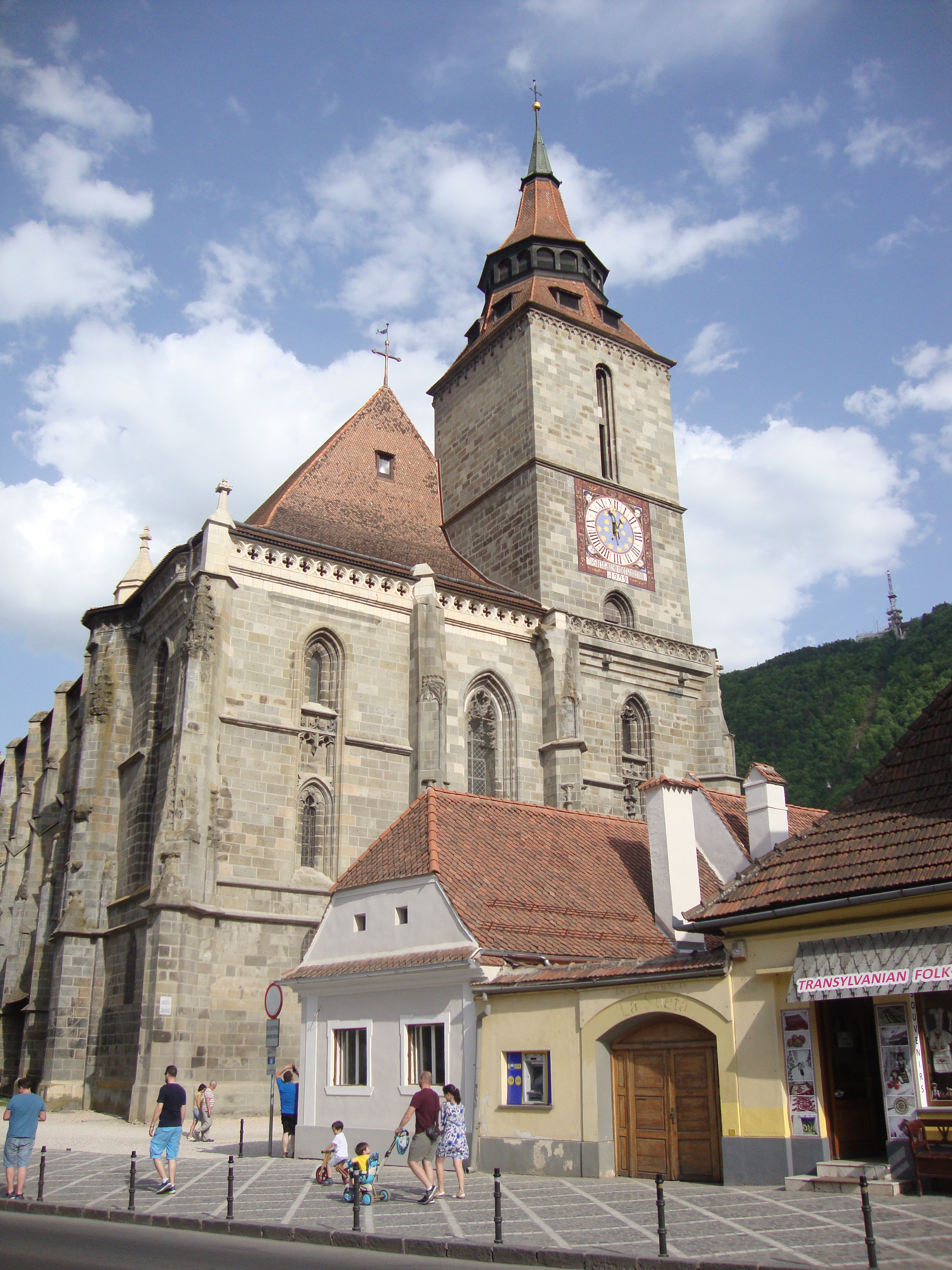
- Black Church, Brașov
- Abbreviation: BECAR
- Type: Western Christianity
- Classification: Protestant
- Orientation: Lutheranism
- Scripture: Bible
- Polity: Quasi-Episcopal
- Bishop: Reinhart Guib
- Districts: 5
- Parishes: 233
- Associations: Lutheran World Federation; Communion of Protestant Churches in Europe; Conference of European Churches; World Council of Churches
- Region: Romania
- Language: German
- Headquarters: Str. General Magheru nr.4, Sibiu
- Founder: Johannes Honter
- Origin: 1542
- Separated from: Roman Catholic Church
- Separations: Evangelical Lutheran Church of Romania (1920)
- Congregations: 254
- Members: 3,373 (2022)
- Priests: 44
- Tertiary institutions: Protestant Theological Institute of Cluj
- Official website: evang.ro

The Evangelical Church of the Augsburg Confession in Romania (German: Evangelische Kirche A.B. [Augsburgischen Bekenntnisses] in Rumänien, Romanian: Biserica Evanghelică de Confesiune Augustană în România) is a German-speaking Lutheran church in Romania, mainly based in Transylvania. It is one of Romania's nineteen officially recognised religious denominations.

As a Lutheran church, it adheres to the Augsburg Confession. Its history goes back to the 12th century when the Transylvanian Saxons arrived in the region, then part of the Kingdom of Hungary. The church has altar and pulpit fellowship with, but is distinct from, the Evangelical Lutheran Church of Romania, which is mainly Hungarian-speaking. It also cooperates with the Calvinist Reformed Church in Romania.

== History ==
=== Beginnings ===
The history of the Evangelical (Lutheran) Church in the territory of today's Romania finds its beginnings in the mid-16th century, through the humanist cartographer and reformer Johannes Honterus. Martin Luther's writings had been brought and spread in Transylvania as early as 1519, but the real reformation among the German Catholic population took place in 1542 (or 1543) with the publication of Reformationsbüchlein, Reformation booklets, by Honterus in his own printing house in Brașov (German: Kronstadt).

In 1572, the Synod of Mediasch (Romanian: Mediaș) accepted the Augsburg Confession, one of the most important doctrinal documents of Evangelical Lutheranism (presented in 1530 at the Diet of Augsburg), as the basis for preaching and church life.

In the semi-independent Principality of Transylvania (under Turkish control), the church enjoyed much religious freedom. However, this changed when it came under Habsburg control, with the Catholic Church having privileged status.

=== 20th century ===
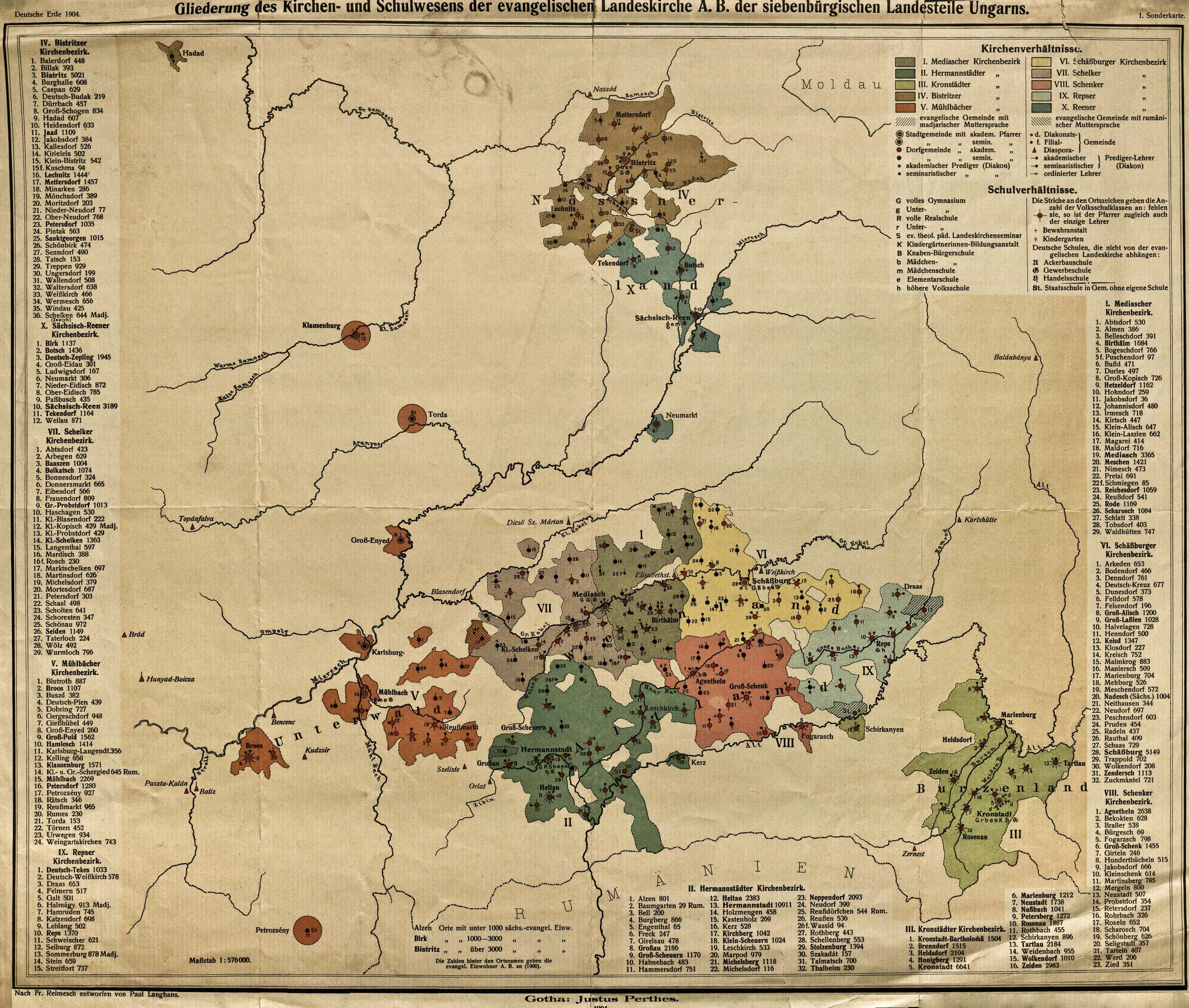
The organization of the German and Hungarian Lutheran church in Transylvania in 1904

The Lutheran German minority was highly persecuted during the communist era. The church activities were surveyed by the Securitate, its school system and the diaconal institutions were dismantled. This resulted in an increasing emigration of members. After the 1989 revolution (and the opening of the borders), many Germans left the country, which decimated the number of members in the church.

Since 1994 female ordination is allowed.

Membership declined in the 20th and 21st century; the church has 14,000 members.

== Churches ==
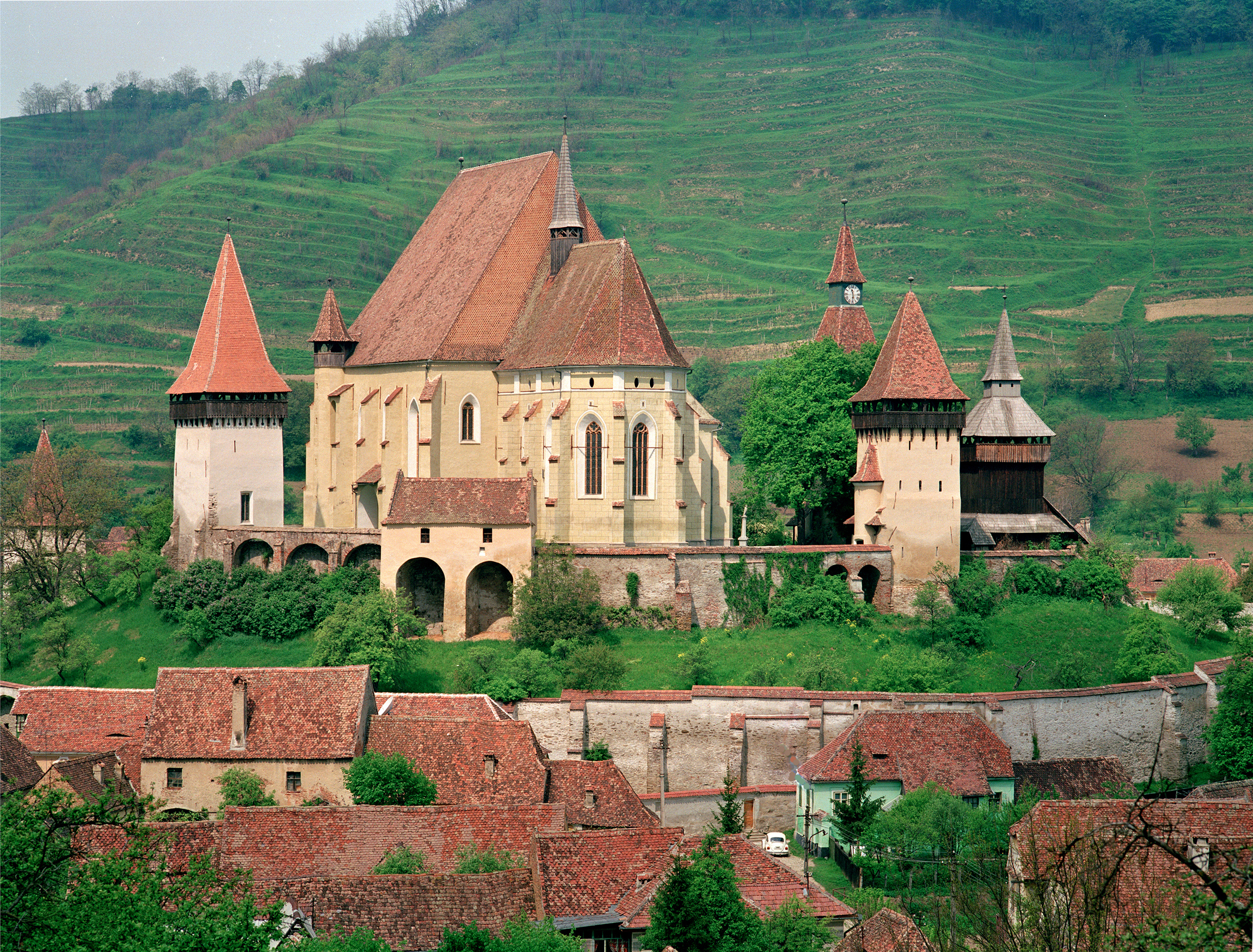
Biertan fortified church, one of many fortified churches in Transylvania.

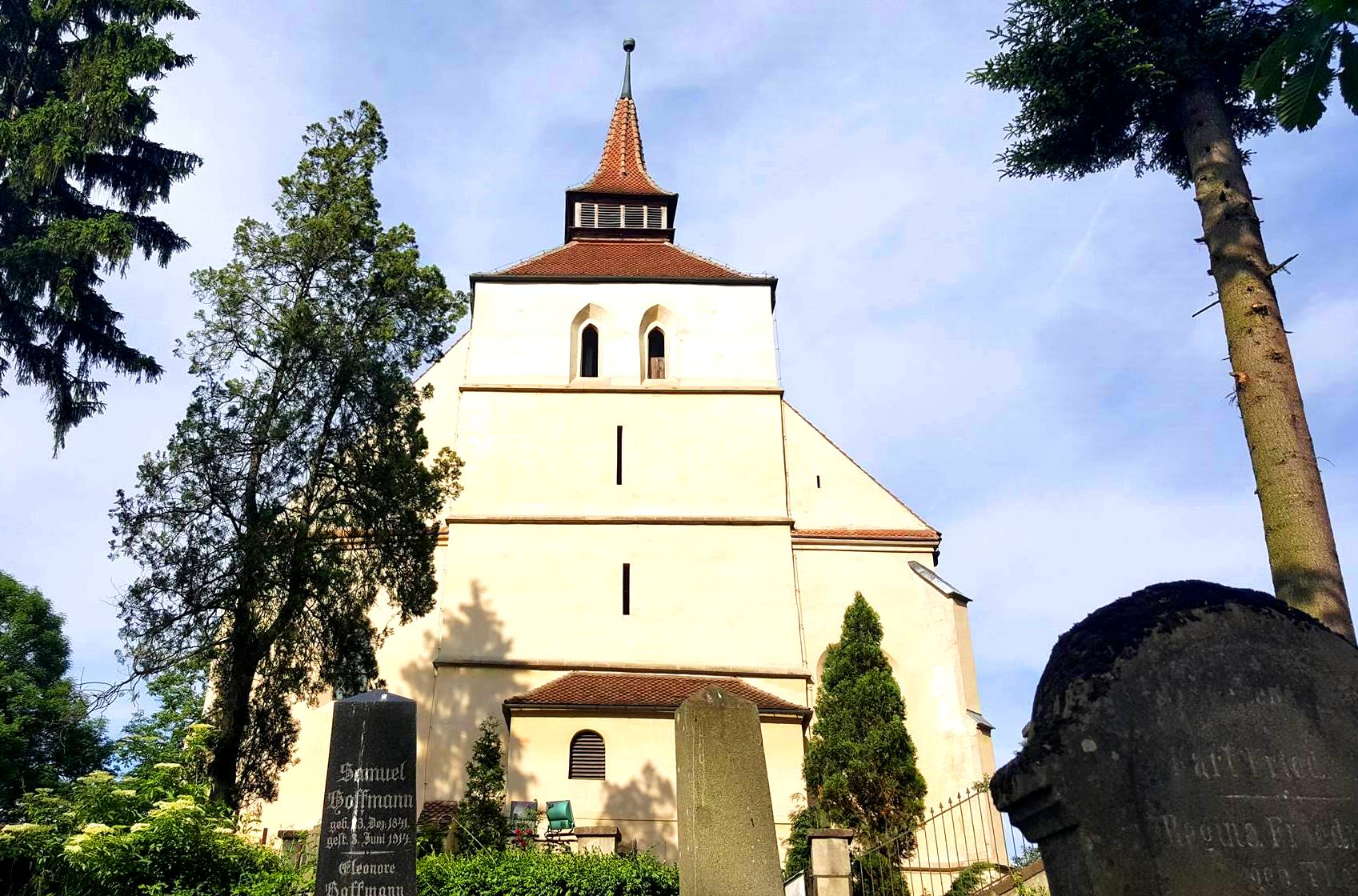
Church on the Hill, Sighișoara

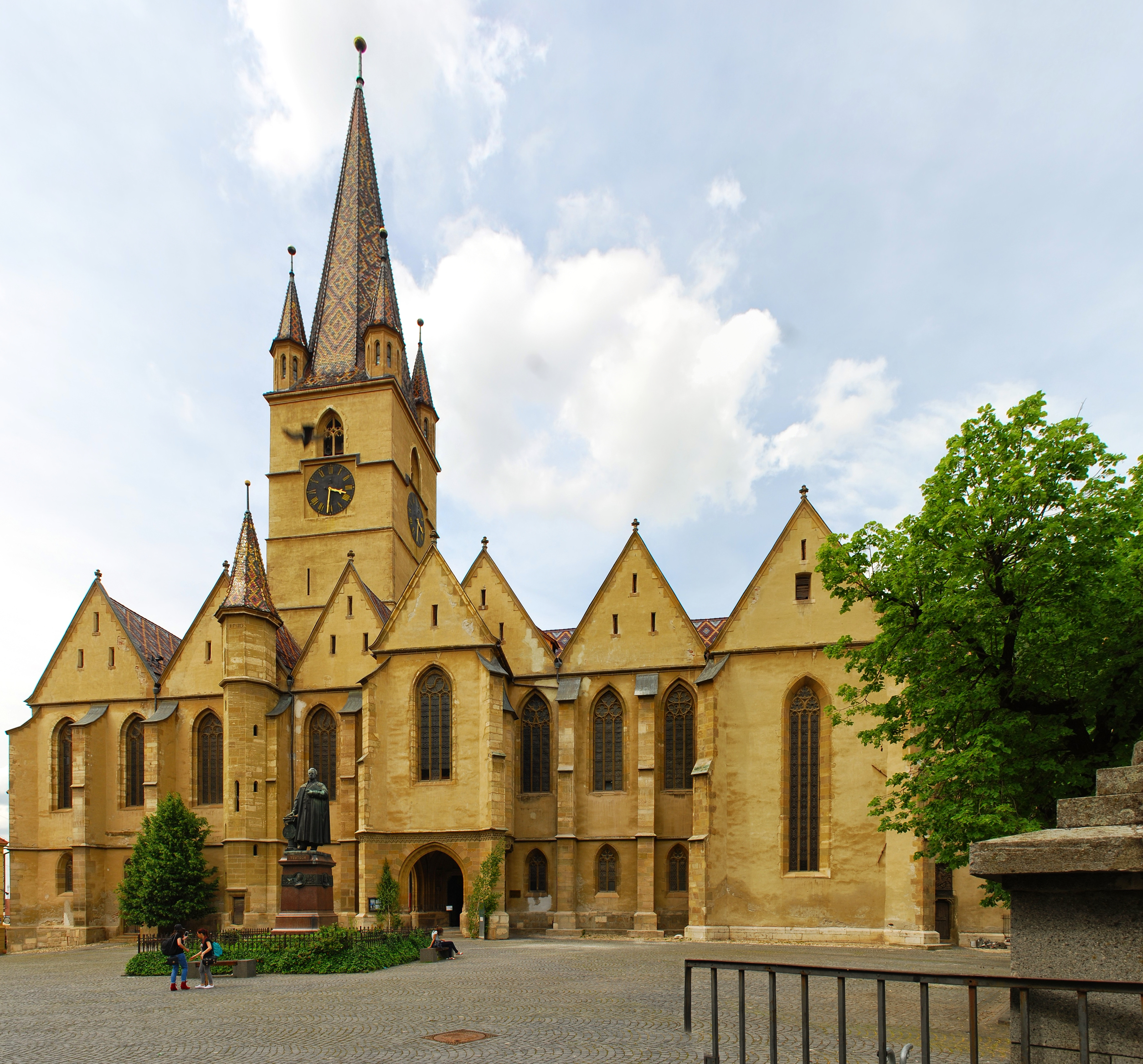
Saint Mary Cathedral, Sibiu

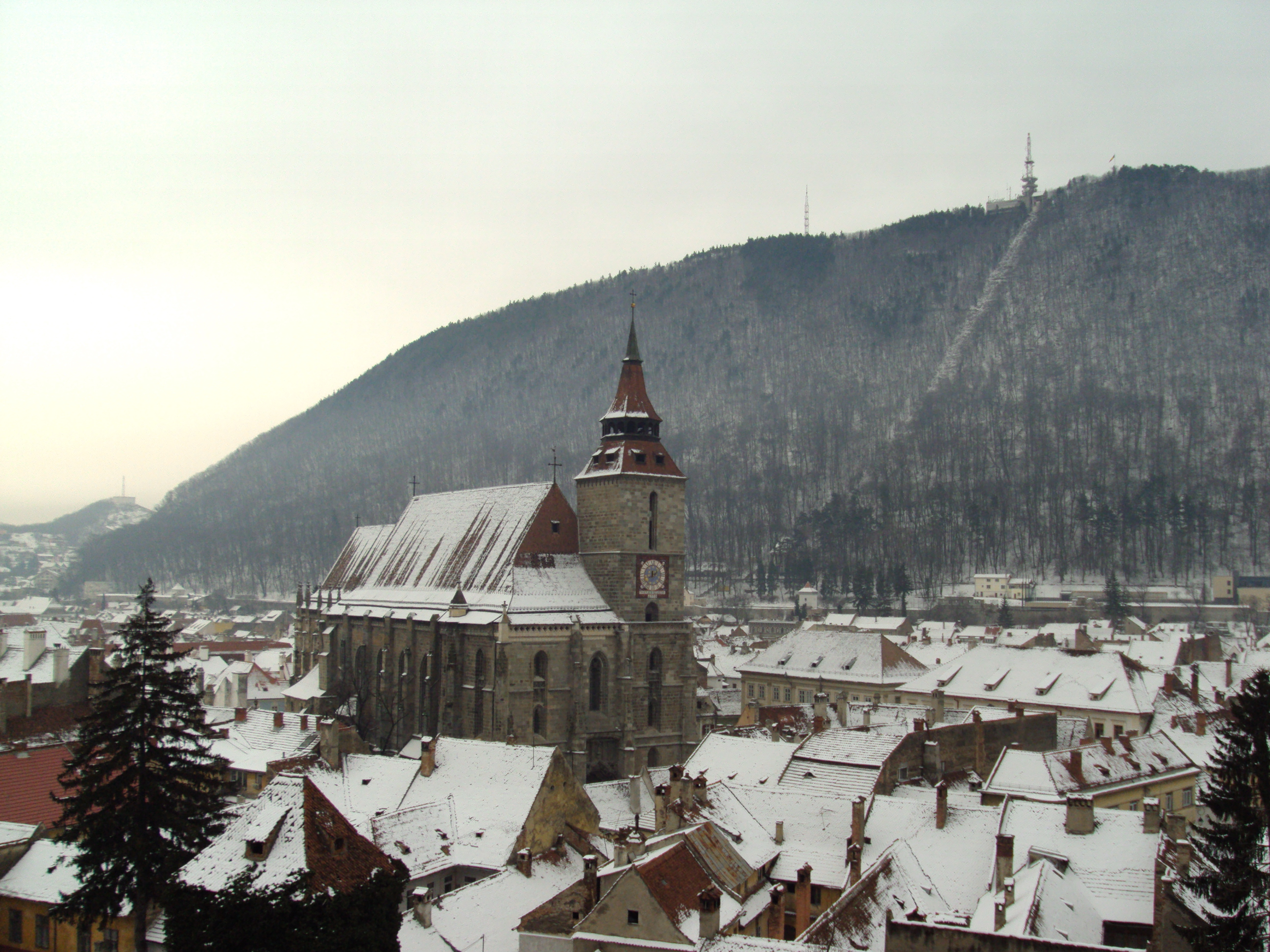
Black Church, Brașov

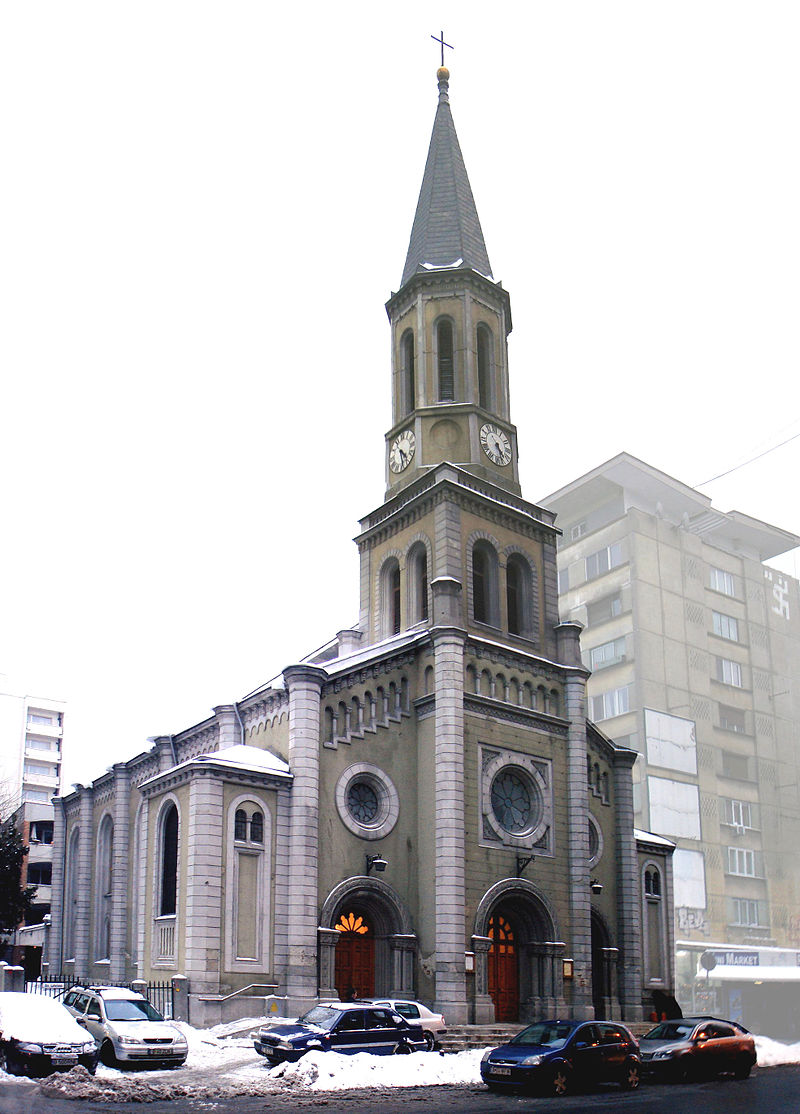
Lutheran Church, Bucharest

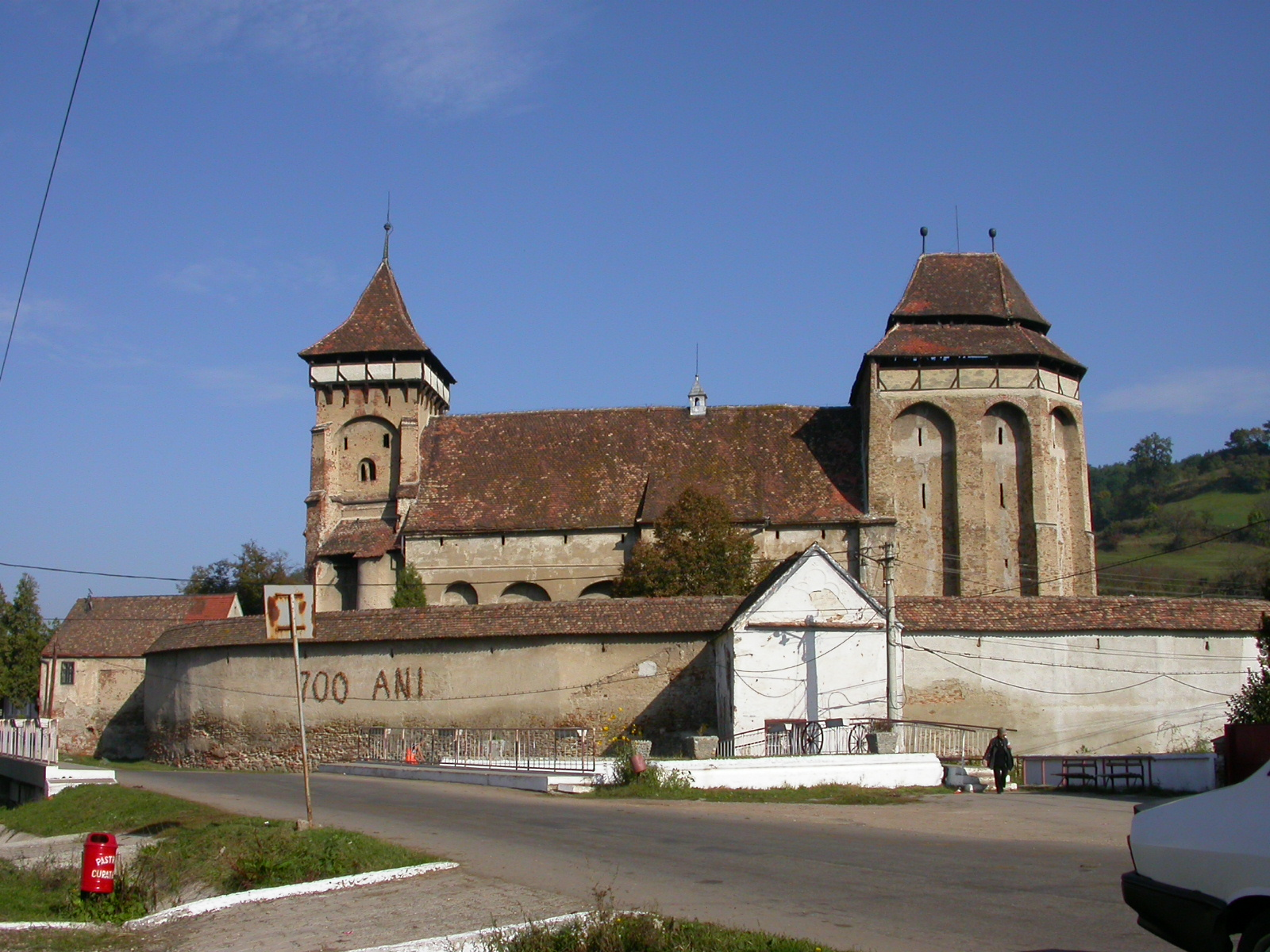
Valea Viilor fortified church, Sibiu County

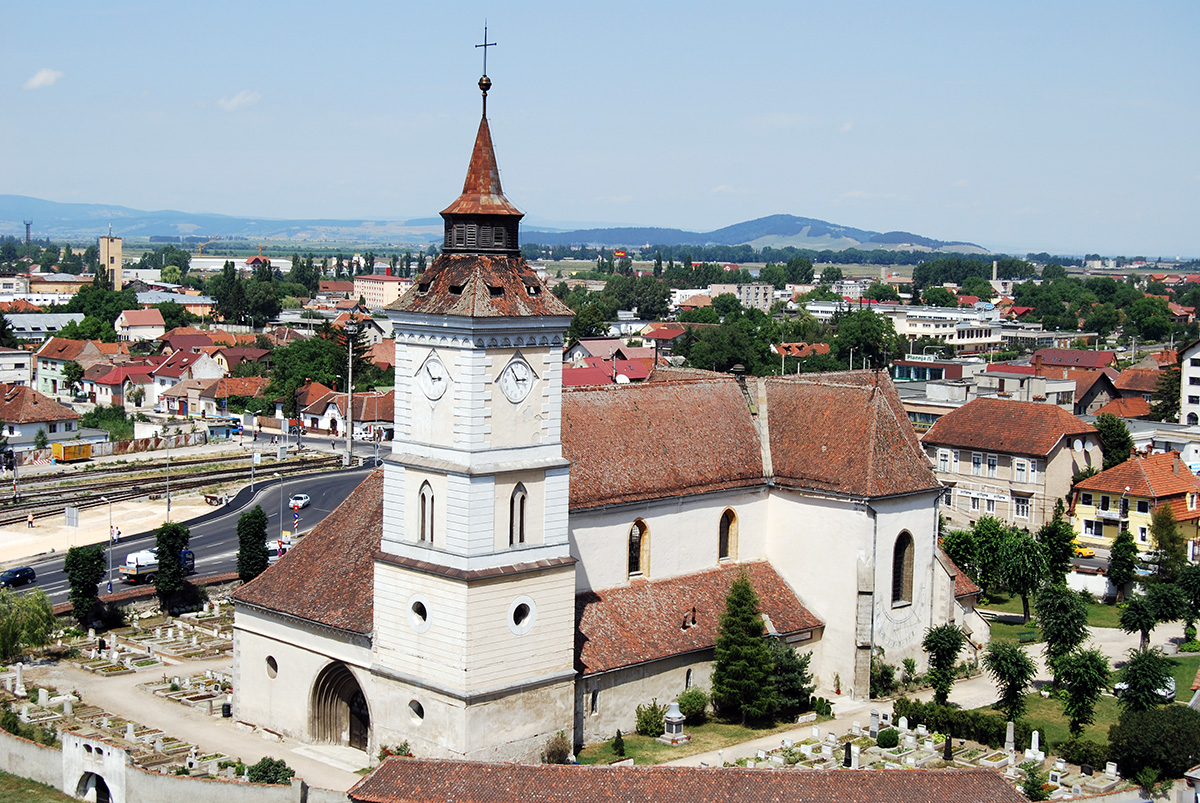
Saint Bartholomew Church, Brașov
