= Bishops in Calvinism =

Overview of episcopal offices in Reformed/Calvinist traditions

The place of bishops in Calvinism is a complex issue. They are generally absent from classic Reformed or presbyterian polity, although there are both present and historic exceptions.

== Terminology ==
Most Reformed bodies teach that all ministers are presbyters and that oversight belongs to assemblies of elders rather than to individual bishops. Moderators, presidents, or stated clerks chair meetings but do not possess diocesan or monarchical authority. This stance distinguishes Reformed or presbyterian polity from the episcopal systems of Anglicanism, Roman Catholicism and Eastern Orthodoxy.

Today, where the title bishop occurs in Calvinist settings it is typically:

- Synodal–administrative: an elected presbyter chairing or representing a district under binding synod decisions;
- Ecumenical–constitutional: a title retained in united churches for legal continuity, with powers limited by Reformed synodality;
- Anglican–Reformed: episcopacy maintained within Anglican polity while espousing Reformed-leaning doctrine.

== Background ==
Despite the fact that the Genevan church operated without bishops, Calvin was not hostile to the office of bishop, although many of his later followers later would develop that hostility. Instead the church in Calvin's Geneva operated with pastors, elders and deacons overseen by the Company of Pastors and the city’s consistory. This template was widely imitated by most Reformed churches who embraced a presbyterial–synodal structure in which authority is exercised by ordained presbyters (elders) in graded courts (session/consistory, presbytery/classis, synod). In this model, no single prelate holds jurisdiction over a diocese, and historic diocesan episcopacy is usually rejected as lacking explicit New Testament warrant. And although there are exceptions, standard Reformed confessional statements such as the Second Helvetic Confession and the Westminster Form of Presbyterial Church Government describe ministry in terms of pastors/teachers, elders and deacons, not diocesan bishops.

== Continental Calvinism ==
Bishops are absent from mainstream Calvinism in most Continental Calvinist traditions such as the Netherlands, South Africa, Switzerland and France.

=== Eastern Europe ===
All Hungarian Reformed churches in Europe are historically Calvinist but organise life into districts led by elected bishops (püspök). These bishops preside and represent their districts but are constrained by synodical governance and do not claim apostolic succession in a sacramental sense.

The Polish Reformed Church bodies historically used superintendent (sometimes translated as bishop) for regional leaders under synodal control.

=== Union churches ===
Certain united or federation churches with substantial Reformed components employ bishop or superintendent as a constitutional office shared across Lutheran–Reformed unions. These churches mostly tend to be in either the mostly German United tradition such as the Prussian Union of Churches) or the more recent Leuenberg tradition. Authority remains legally synodal rather than prelatical.

== Presbyterianism ==
The national Church of Scotland and most Scottish Presbyterian churches reject episcopacy; leadership is through kirk sessions, presbyteries and General Assembly moderators. Early Scottish reformers briefly used the title superintendent (not sacramental bishops) for regionally tasked ministers. However due to Charles I of England's appointment of Scottish Bishops to try to bring more ceremonial Anglican forms into Scotland, the General Assembly of the Church of Scotland expelled the bishops, starting the Bishops' Wars and hostility to bishops became a tenet of Scottish Calvinist thought.

After an attempt to restore bishops to Scotland after the Restoration in 1660, although this was ended when William III ascended to the throne in 1688. Now the Presbyterian settlement has dispensed with diocesan oversight in favour of presbyteries and synods.

Today the term bishop when used in the Church of Scotland refers to a minister who is placed in charge of a person training for the ministry is referred to as the student's bishop. Most of the former mission churches from the Presbyterian tradition, such as America, South Korea and Nigeria follow presbyterial polity without diocesan bishops.

== Anglicanism ==
In the years after the English Reformation the Church of England was part of Reformed Christianity with leaders such as Thomas Cranmer, influenced by Calvinist theologians. As with Lutheranism, the Church of England retained elements of Catholicism such as bishops and vestments, thus sometimes being called "but halfly Reformed" or a middle way between Lutheranism and Reformed Christianity, being closer liturgically to the former and theologically aligned with the latter. Beginning in the 17th century, Anglicanism broadened to the extent that Reformed theology is no longer the sole dominant theology of Anglicanism.

There was a Puritan subculture within Anglicanism that although in the reign of Elizabeth I aimed mostly at perceived retained Catholic practices in worship (many of which were in Cathedrals), although there was also some opposition to bishops.

When James I, who was already king of Presbyterian Scotland and raised a Calvinist, arrived in London to take become King of England, the Puritan clergy presented him with the Millenary Petition, allegedly signed by a thousand English clergy, to abolish items such as wedding rings as "outward badges of Popish errours". James, however, equated English Puritans with Scottish Presbyterians and, after banning religious petitions, told the Hampton Court Conference of 1604 that he preferred the status quo with the monarch ruling the church through the bishops saying that if bishops were put out of power, "I know what would become of my supremacy, No bishop, no King. When I mean to live under a presbytery I will go to Scotland again.

During the reign of Charles I the Calvinist Puritans had taken up opposition to bishops with both petitions and riots against them.

William III, although also a Calvinist, kept bishops in the Church of England, partly through political calculation but also through an interpretation of his Coronation Oath that obliged him to defend the "Protestant Reformed Religion Established by Law". However his government did end Episcopacy in Scotland, but due to political calculation rather than personal belief.

== See also ==
- Presbyterian polity
- Reformed church
- Episcopal polity
- Superintendent (ecclesiastical)
- Moderator of the General Assembly

== Sources ==
- Croft, Pauline (2004). King James. Basingstoke and New York: Palgrave Macmillan. ISBN 0-333-61395-3.
- MacCulloch, Diarmaid (2009). A History of Christianity: The First Three Thousand Years. Allen Lane. ISBN 978-0-7139-9869-6.
- Wedgwood, C. V. (1966). The King's Peace: 1637–1641. London: C. Nicholls.
- Wedgwood, C. V. (1970). The King's War: 1641–1647. London: Fontana.
- Willson, David Harris (1963). King James VI & I. London: Jonathan Cape Ltd. ISBN 0-224-60572-0.
