= Presbyterian polity =

Church government by assemblies of elders

Presbyterian or presbyteral polity is a method of church governance ("ecclesiastical polity") typified by the rule of assemblies of presbyters, or elders. Each local church is governed by a body of elected elders usually called the session (or consistory), though other terms, such as church board, may apply. (Note: For example, the Church of the Nazarene, which subscribes to a body of religious doctrines that are quite distinct from those of most properly named Presbyterian denominations (and which instead descends historically from the Wesleyan Holiness Movement), employs a blend of congregationalist, episcopal, and presbyterian polities; its local churches are governed by an elected body known as the church board or simply "board members"; the term elder in the Nazarene Church has a different use entirely, referring to an ordained minister of that denomination.) Groups of local churches are governed by a higher assembly of elders known as the presbytery or classis; presbyteries can be grouped into a synod, and presbyteries and synods nationwide often join in a general assembly. Responsibility for conduct of church services is reserved to an ordained minister or pastor known as a teaching elder, or a minister of the word and sacrament.

Presbyterian polity was developed as a rejection of governance by hierarchies of single bishops (episcopal polity), but also differs from the congregationalist polity in which each congregation is independent. In contrast to the other two forms, authority in the presbyterian polity flows both from the top down (as higher assemblies exercise limited but important authority over individual congregations, e.g., only the presbytery can ordain ministers; install pastors; and start up, close, and approve relocating a congregation) and from the bottom up (e.g., the moderator and officers are not appointed from above but are rather elected by and from among the members of the assembly). This theory of governance developed in Geneva under John Calvin and was introduced to Scotland by John Knox after his period of exile in Geneva. It is strongly associated with French, Dutch, Swiss and Scottish Reformation movements, and the Reformed and Presbyterian churches.

== History ==
Among the early church fathers, it was noted that the offices of elder and bishop were identical, and were not differentiated until later, and that plurality of elders was the norm for church government. St. Jerome (347–420) "In Epistle Titus", vol. iv, said, "Elder is identical with bishop; and before the urging of the devil gave rise to factionalism in religion, so much that it was being said among the people, 'I am of Paul, I of Apollos, I of Cephas', the churches were governed by a joint council of elders. After it was... decreed throughout the world that one chosen from among the presbyters should be placed over the others." This observation was also made by Chrysostom (349–407) in "Homilia i, in Phil. i, 1" and Theodoret (393–457) in "Interpret ad. Phil. iii", 445.

Aerius of Sebaste also attacked the episcopal polity in the 4th century.

Presbyterianism was first described in detail by Martin Bucer of Strasbourg, who believed that the early Christian church implemented presbyterian polity. The first modern implementation was by the Geneva church under the leadership of John Calvin in 1541.

In the early days of the Scottish Reformation there were Superintendents. There were also Tulchan Bishops and Archbishops. Much of the history of the Church of Scotland and the nation itself is bound up with the relation between Episcopalianism, which the Protestant monarchs favoured, and the Presbyterianism of the reformers. In the Hungarian Reformed Church there remain bishops who have a superintending role.

== Basis ==
Presbyterian polity is constructed on specific assumptions about the form of the government intended by the Bible:

- "Bishop" (Koine Greek episkopos) and "elder" (Koine Greek presbyteros) are (in this view) synonymous terms. Episkopos means literally overseer and describes the function of the elder, rather than the maturity of the officer. A bishop holds the highest office of the church (there is no Patriarch, Prelate or Pope over bishops).
- Preaching (the ministry of the Word) and the administration of the sacraments is ordinarily entrusted to specially trained elders (known as ministers of the Word and Sacrament, sometimes called "teaching elders") in each local congregation, approved for these tasks by a governing presbytery, or classis, and called by the local congregation.
- In addition to these ministers, there are also "others … with gifts for government … commonly call[ed] "elders" or "ruling elders".
- Pastoral care, church discipline, leadership and legislation are committed to the care of ruling assemblies of presbyters among whom the ministers and "ruling elders" are equal participants.
- All Christian people together are the priesthood (see priesthood of all believers), on behalf of whom the elders are called to serve by the consent of the congregation.

Presbyterianism uses a conciliar method of church government (that is, leadership by the group or council). Thus, the ministers and "elders" govern together as a group, and at all times the office is for the service of the congregation, to pray for them and to encourage them in the faith. The elders together exercise oversight (episcopacy) over the local congregation, with superior groups of elders gathered on a regional basis exercising wider oversight.

Presbyterians typically have viewed this method of government as approximating that of the New Testament and earliest churches.

Presbyterianism is also distinct from congregationalism, in that individual congregations are not independent, but are answerable to the wider church, through its governing bodies (presbyteries, synods and assemblies). Moreover, the ordained ministry possesses a distinct responsibility for preaching and sacraments. Congregational churches are sometimes called "Presbyterian" if they are governed by a council of elders; but the difference is that every local congregation is independent, and its elders are accountable to its members, and congregationalism's wider assemblies are not ordinarily empowered to enforce discipline. Thus, these are ruled by elders only at the level of the congregations, which are united with one another by covenants of trust.

== Offices ==
=== Elder ===
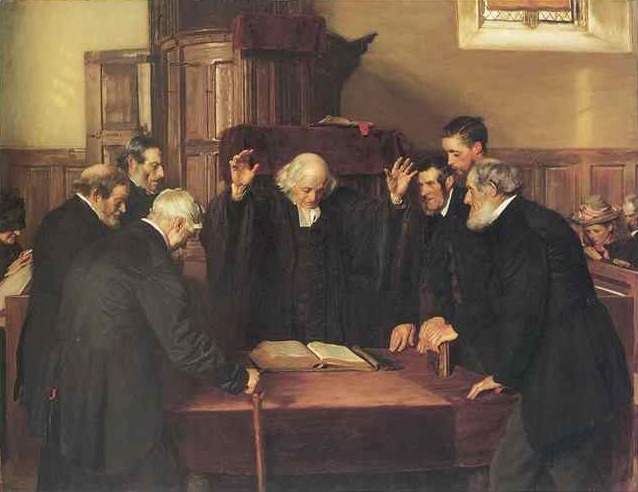
The Ordination of Elders in a Scottish Kirk, by John Henry Lorimer, 1891. National Gallery of Scotland.

There are two types of elder; the teaching elder (see Minister below) and the ruling elder. An excerpt from Miller (1831) expands this.

In every Church completely organized, that is, furnished with all the officers which Christ has instituted and which are necessary for carrying into full effect the laws of his kingdom, there ought to be three classes of officers, viz: at least one Teaching Elder, Bishop, or Pastor — a bench of Ruling Elders — and Deacons. The first to "minister in the Word and Doctrine", and to dispense the sacraments; — the second to assist in the inspection and government of the Church; — and the third to "serve tables"; that is, to take care of the Church's funds destined for the support of the poor, and sometimes to manage whatever relates to the temporal support of the gospel and its ministers.

Depending upon the specific denomination, teaching elders may also be referred to with terms such as "Minister of Word and Sacrament".

The elders are persons chosen from among the congregation and ordained for this service. Beyond that, practices vary: sometimes elders are elected by the congregation, sometimes appointed by the session, in some denominations elders serve for life, others have fixed terms, and some churches appoint elders on a rotation from among willing members in good standing in the church. However, in many churches, ruling elders retain their ordination for life, even though they serve fixed terms. Even after the end of their terms, they may be active in presbyteries or other bodies, and may serve communion.

In addition to sitting on the session and other church courts, ruling elders have duties as individuals. Again, Miller (1831) explains,

It is their duty to have an eye of inspection and care over all the members of the congregation; and, for this purpose, to cultivate a universal and intimate acquaintance, as far as may be, with every family in the flock of which they are made "overseers".

=== Minister ===
In some denominations they are called Ministers of Word and Sacrament, and in others they are called Teaching Elders. Ministers called to a particular congregation are called pastors, and serve a function analogous to clergy in other denominations. (Because ruling elders are often ordained in a fashion nearly identical to teaching elders, the distinction between lay and clergy is not as clear under the Presbyterian system as in others). The terms 'lay' and 'clergy' are not properly used in presbyterian polity.

Ministers may be considered equal in status with the other elders, but they have a distinct ordination and distinct function. They are the primary preachers and teachers, celebrants of sacraments. There are sometimes further distinctions between the minister and the other elders. Some Presbyterian denominations enroll ministers as members of their respective congregations, while others enroll the minister as a member of the regional presbytery. The presbyteries are responsible for the ordination of the ministers.

Until the 20th century, only men had been eligible for ordination as elders or ministers of the word and sacrament. This is widely not the case any longer, although it is usually considered a demarcation issue, distinguishing "liberal" from "conservative" Presbyterian denominations. In North America, the Reformed Church in America, Christian Reformed Church in North America (both of Dutch Reformed heritage), Cumberland Presbyterian Church, ECO: A Covenant Order of Evangelical Presbyterians, Evangelical Presbyterian Church, Presbyterian Church in Canada, and Presbyterian Church (U.S.A.) are denominations with presbyterian polity which allow for the ordination of women.

The general assembly of a denomination often decides on what grounds a person may be ordained, but the ordination of ministers is the right of the presbytery or classis, and the right to extend a call to a minister is the privilege of the members of the parish or congregation. (Note: As an example of qualifications for office as teaching elder, many denominations require a period of theological education at university level.)

=== Deacon ===
The office of deacon has different meanings among different presbyterian churches. In some churches, deacons exercise responsibility for practical matters of finance and fabric, either separately or together with the elders. In some cases deacons administer the welfare matters of the congregation, while a separate board of management or trustees administers the other material business (temporalities) of the congregation, such as its endowments, salaries and buildings.

== Governing bodies ==
=== Session ===
A session is a corporate body of teaching and ruling elders elected by a particular church. sessio from sedere "to sit"), sometimes the Kirk session, church session, or (in Continental Reformed usage) consistory. In some Continental Reformed churches, deacons are members of the consistory; others, such as the Christian Reformed Church in North America, distinguish between the consistory, comprising the pastor and elders, and the council, which comprises the pastor(s), the elders, and the deacons.

In most denominations the pastor serves as Moderator and presides over the session (primus inter pares), in which all elders have an equal vote. In some denominations, the pastor is not given a vote; however, in a sitting body of an even number or with a quorum of the session counted they can break a tie by a casting vote.

In the Polity of the Presbyterian Church (U.S.A.), the pastor and associate pastor(s), if elected by the congregation and "installed" to a permanent pastorate by the presbytery, have votes as members of the session on any and all matters; however, often they refrain from voting except in tie situations. The Pastor is not a voting member of the congregation.

With the Session there is one person, usually an elder but not always, who will be given the title, "Clerk of Session". This person is more or less the secretary for Session. They take notes on each meeting and are responsible for records of the congregation. In addition they find a wide area of responsibility, including responsibility for conduct of worship should a minister suddenly not be available. Although it is the responsibility of the Moderator (minister), Session Clerks often have the ability to assist in keeping meetings on track due to skills which are received from experience and the Holy Spirit.

=== Presbytery ===
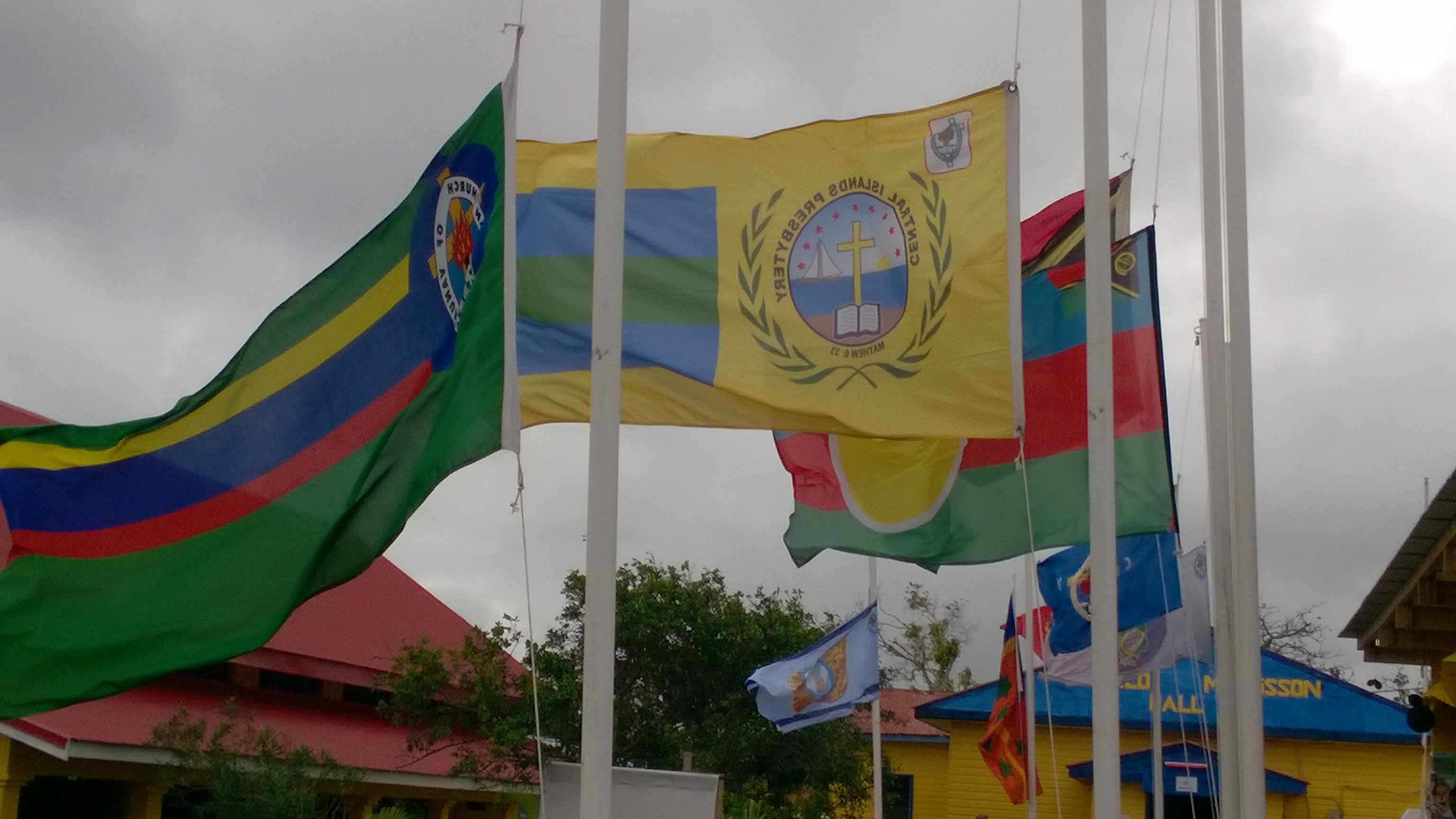
Presbytery flags of the Presbyterian Church of Vanuatu.

In presbyterianism, congregations are united in accountability to a regional body called the presbytery, or, in Continental Reformed terminology, the classis, which comes from the Latin word for "fleet". Presbyteries are made up of all the teaching and ruling elders in a particular geographic region. In some Dutch Reformed bodies, a classis serves as a delegated body, which ceases to exist in between meetings, whereas a presbytery exists perpetually.

The officers of a presbytery are a moderator and a stated or principal clerk. The moderator acts as chair of presbytery meetings. As with the moderators of synods and assemblies, the moderatorship is a primus inter pares position appointed by the presbytery itself. The moderator is addressed as "moderator" during meetings, but their position has no bearing outside of the presbytery meeting and affords him/her no special place in other courts, although typically the moderator (especially if a member of the clergy) will conduct worship and oversee ordinations and installations of ministers as a "liturgical" bishop, and other ordinances which are seen as acts of the presbytery.

The stated or principal clerk takes minutes and deals with the correspondence of the presbytery, and is often appointed for an indefinite term. Presbytery Clerks are the ecclesiastical administrators and generally regarded as substantially influential due to their greater experience of the governance of the church and their ordering of the business of the presbytery. They are thus very much more than secretaries and often in fact are the lynch pin of the organisation.

Presbyteries meet at a regularity between monthly and quarterly, some half-yearly.

=== Synod ===
In denominations too large for all the work of the denomination to be done by a single presbytery, the parishes may be divided into several presbyteries under synods and general assemblies, the synod being the lower court of the two. In the United Church of Canada, this is referred to as "conferences" and "General Council". However, the United Church of Canada does not bear the formal ecclesiastical structure of classic Presbyterianism.

Often all members of the constituent presbyteries are members of the synod. Like the commissioners to presbyteries, the commissioners to synods do not act on instruction from their congregations or presbyteries, but exercise their own judgement. A synod also has a moderator and clerk, and generally meet less often than the presbytery.

Some presbyterian churches, like the Church of Scotland, Orthodox Presbyterian Church and Presbyterian Church in America have no intermediate court between the presbytery and the general assembly.

=== General assembly ===
The general assembly (or general synod) is the highest court of presbyterian polity. Each presbytery selects a number of its members to be commissioners to the general assembly. The general assembly is chaired by its own moderator, who is usually elected to a single term. The moderator presides over meetings of the assembly, and may be called on in a representative function for the remainder of the year. The moderator has no special place in other courts.

The stated clerk and deputy clerk of the general assembly administer the minutes, correspondence, and business of the assembly. In some cases a separate business convenor is appointed to deal with the agenda. General assemblies meet less regularly than their subordinate courts, often annually, or in the case of the Presbyterian Church (USA), every other year.

The General Assembly also has members serve as Advisory Delegates. There are four different types of advisory delegates, each with a focus on a different area in the Presbyterian Church like young adult, theological student, missionary and ecumenical. The role of an advisory delegate is to speak about issues or topics that commissioners would usually not worry about or care to speak about during a General Assembly meeting. Advisory Delegates may not present motions or vote in meetings of the General Assembly.

The powers of the general assembly are usually wide-ranging. However, they may be limited by some form of external review. For example, the rules of the Church of Scotland include the Barrier Act, which requires that certain major changes to the polity of the church be referred to the presbyteries, before being enacted by the general assembly.

There may be issues arising between annual General Assemblies which require urgent attention. In these cases some presbyterian churches have a 'commission of assembly' who will deal with the issue and refer it to the next General Assembly for homologation.

== Regions ==
=== British Isles ===
The word Presbyterianism, when capitalized, often refers specifically to churches founded on principles of presbyterian polity in the British Isles and their derivatives in other countries.

=== France ===
Huguenot Cross

In France, presbyterianism was represented by the Église réformée de France. There are also Lutherans and Evangelicals. The logo is a Huguenot Cross (Croix huguenote) with the burning bush.

=== Italy ===
The origins of the Waldensian Evangelical Church lie in the medieval Waldensian movement for religious reform. The Waldensians adopted Calvinist theology during the Reformation and became the Italian branch of the Reformed churches. In 1975 the Waldensian Church joined with the Italian Methodist Church to form the Union of Waldensian and Methodist Churches, which is a member of the World Council of Churches, the World Communion of Reformed Churches, and the World Methodist Council.

== Cultural references ==
- Robert Burns published a brief irreverent poem, "On A Celebrated Ruling Elder", as an elegy for a Scottish Presbyterian.

== See also ==
- Christian federalism
- Presbyterianism
- Reformed churches
- Congregational church
- Moderators and clerks in the Church of Scotland
  - General Assembly of the Church of Scotland
  - Moderator of the General Assembly of the Church of Scotland
- Presbyterian Historical Society
- For a full list of individual denominations see List of Christian denominations#Reformed and List of Christian denominations#Presbyterianism

== Sources ==
- Bannerman, James (1868a). The church of Christ : a treatise on the nature, powers, ordinances, discipline, and government of the Christian church. Vol. 1. Edinburgh: T. T. Clark.
- ——— (1868b). The church of Christ: a treatise on the nature, powers, ordinances, discipline, and government of the Christian church. Vol. 2. Edinburgh: T. T. Clark.
- Benedict, Philip (2002). Christ's Churches Purely Reformed: A Social History of Calvinism. New Haven: Yale University Press. p. xiv. ISBN 978-0-30010507-0.
- Chisholm, Hugh, ed. (1911). "Presbyterianism". Encyclopædia Britannica (11th ed.). Cambridge University Press.
- Cunningham, William (1863a). "VIII – The Constitution of the Church". Historical theology : a review of the principal doctrinal discussions in the Christian church since the apostolic age. Vol. 1. Edinburgh: T. & T. Clark. pp. 227–66 & passim.
- ——— (1863b). "XXVI – Church Government". Historical theology : a review of the principal doctrinal discussions in the Christian church since the apostolic age. Vol. 2. Edinburgh: T. & T. Clark. pp. 514–56 & passim – via Archive.
- Johnston, John C (1887). Treasury of the Scottish covenant. Edinburgh: Andrew Elliot – via Archive.
- McHugh, John Ambrose (1911). "Presbyterianism". In Herbermann, Charles (ed.). Catholic Encyclopedia. Vol. 12. New York: Robert Appleton Company.
- M'Crie, Thomas (1875). The story of the Scottish church : from the Reformation to the Disruption. London: Blackie & Son – via Archive.
- Miller, Samuel (1842). An essay on the warrant, nature, and duties of the office of the ruling elder in the Presbyterian Church. Edinburgh: Robert Ogle – via Archive.
