= Reformed Diocese of Királyhágómellék =

The Reformed Diocese of Királyhágómellék or Királyhágómellék Reformed Church District (Hungarian: Királyhágómelléki Református Egyházkerület; Romanian: Episcopia Reformată de pe lângă Piatra Craiului) is one of the two dioceses of the Reformed Church in Romania, with its headquarters in Oradea. It was part of the Reformed Diocese of Tiszántúl of the Reformed Church in Hungary from the 16th century until 1920, when it came under Romanian administration in accordance with the Treaty of Trianon and became part of the newly founded Reformed Church in Romania. In 2004, it had 320,000 members in 271 congregations and 342 house fellowships. The Apostles Creed, the Heidelberg Catechism and the Second Helvetic Confession are the official standards.

== List of bishops ==
- István Sulyok (1921–1942)
- Béla Csernák (1946–1947)
- Aladár Arday (1948–1961)
- Sándor Buthy (1962–1967)
- László Papp (1967–1990)
- László Tőkés (1990–2009)
- István Csűry (2009–present)

== See also ==
- Reformed Diocese of Transylvania
