= Japan Evangelical Lutheran Kumamoto Church =

Lutheran church in Kumamoto, Japan

Coordinates: 32°48′10.5″N 130°42′46.6″E

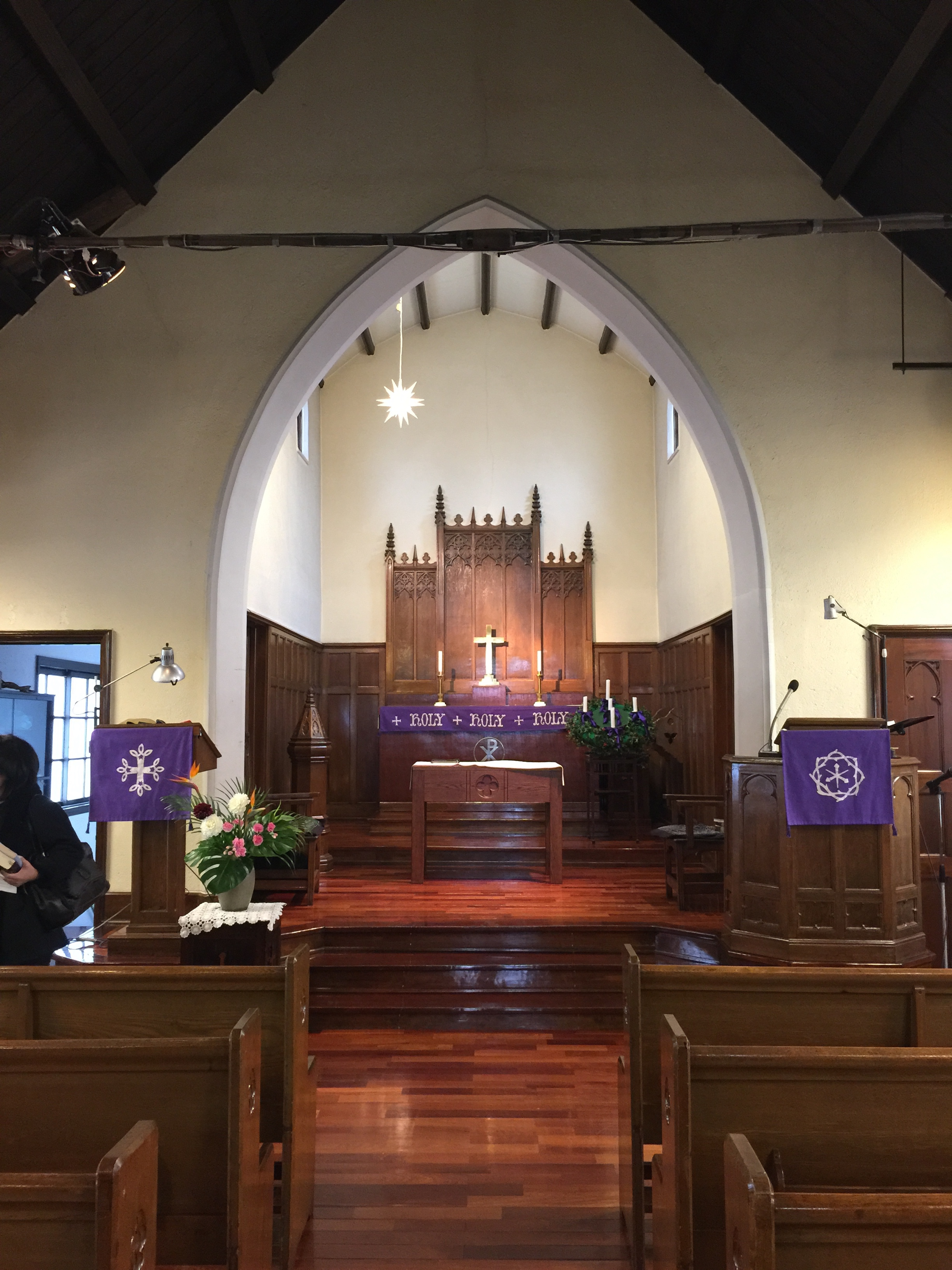
Chapel

The Japan Evangelical Lutheran Kumamoto Church (日本福音ルーテル熊本教会) is a Lutheran church in Kumamoto, Japan.

== History ==
The church was built on June 20, 1905. On July 1, 1945, it was destroyed in an air raid. Reconstruction of the church was completed on May 2, 1950.
