= Mainline Protestant =

Historic established Protestant denominations

Mainline Protestants (also referred to as modernist Protestants or oldline Protestants) are a group of historically established Protestant denominations in the United States and Canada that are generally associated with theologically liberal or theologically progressive currents of Protestantism, in contrast to the largely theologically conservative evangelical, fundamentalist, charismatic, confessional Confessing Movement, historically Black church, and Global South Protestant denominations and congregations. Some make a distinction between "mainline" and "oldline", with the former referring only to denominational ties and the latter referring to church lineage, prestige and influence. However, this distinction has largely been lost to history and the terms are now nearly synonymous.

Mainline Protestant churches have stressed social justice and personal salvation and, both politically and theologically, tend to be more liberal than non-Mainline Protestant churches. Mainline Protestant churches share a common approach that often leads to collaboration in organizations such as the National Council of Churches, and because of their involvement with the ecumenical movement, they are sometimes given the alternative label of ecumenical Protestantism (especially outside the United States). While in 1970 the Mainline Protestant churches claimed most Protestants and more than 30 percent of the American population as members, as of 2009 they were a minority among American Protestants, claiming approximately 15 percent of American adults. In 2025, approximately 13 percent of Americans were white non-Hispanic Mainline Protestants according to the Public Religion Research Institute's Census of American Religion.

Mainline Protestantism is largely associated with the "Seven Sisters of American Protestantism," those being the United Methodist Church, the Evangelical Lutheran Church in America, the Episcopal Church, the Presbyterian Church (USA), American Baptist Churches USA, the United Church of Christ, and the Christian Church (Disciples of Christ).

== Terminology ==
The term Mainline Protestant was coined during debates between modernists and fundamentalists in the 1920s. Several sources claim that the term is derived from the Philadelphia Main Line, a group of affluent suburbs of Philadelphia; most residents belonged to Mainline denominations. Today, most Mainline Protestants remain rooted in the Northeastern and Midwestern United States. C. Kirk Hadaway and Penny Long Marler define the term as follows: "the term 'Mainline Protestant' is used along with 'mainstream Protestant' and 'oldline Protestant' to categorize denominations that are affiliated with the National Council of Churches and have deep historical roots in and long-standing influence on American society."

In the US, Protestantism is generally divided between Mainline denominations and evangelical or theologically conservative denominations. The term is also occasionally used to refer to historic Protestant churches in Canada, Europe, Hong Kong, Latin America, and South Africa. The term has also been applied globally by researchers at Durham University. In some other parts of the world, the term Mainline Protestant is not used. Instead, the term "ecumenical" is used to distinguish similar churches from evangelical denominations. Some have criticized the term Mainline for its alleged White Anglo-Saxon Protestant ethnocentric and elitist assumptions, and its erroneous association with the term "mainstream" since it almost exclusively described White American, non-fundamentalist and non-evangelical Protestant Americans from its origin to the late twentieth century.

=== Mainline vs. mainstream ===
The term mainstream Christian in academic usage is not equivalent to Mainline Protestant and is often used as an attempt to find impartial sociological vocabulary in distinguishing orthodoxy and heresy. Hence in Christological and doctrinal reference mainstream Christianity is often equivalent to Trinitarianism. Mainline Protestantism should not be confused with Nicene Christianity which is more widely accepted as having the "mainstream Christianity" designation that also includes Catholics, Eastern and Oriental Orthodox believers, and non-Mainline Protestants such as Evangelical, Fundamentalist, Charismatic, Confessional, Confessing Movement, the historically Black church, and Global South Protestants. In the United Kingdom and Australia, the term Mainline Protestant is rarely used, and mainstream does not mean progressive Protestant. Although some supporters and adherents do claim that Mainline Protestant is synonymous with Mainstream Protestant.

== Denominations ==
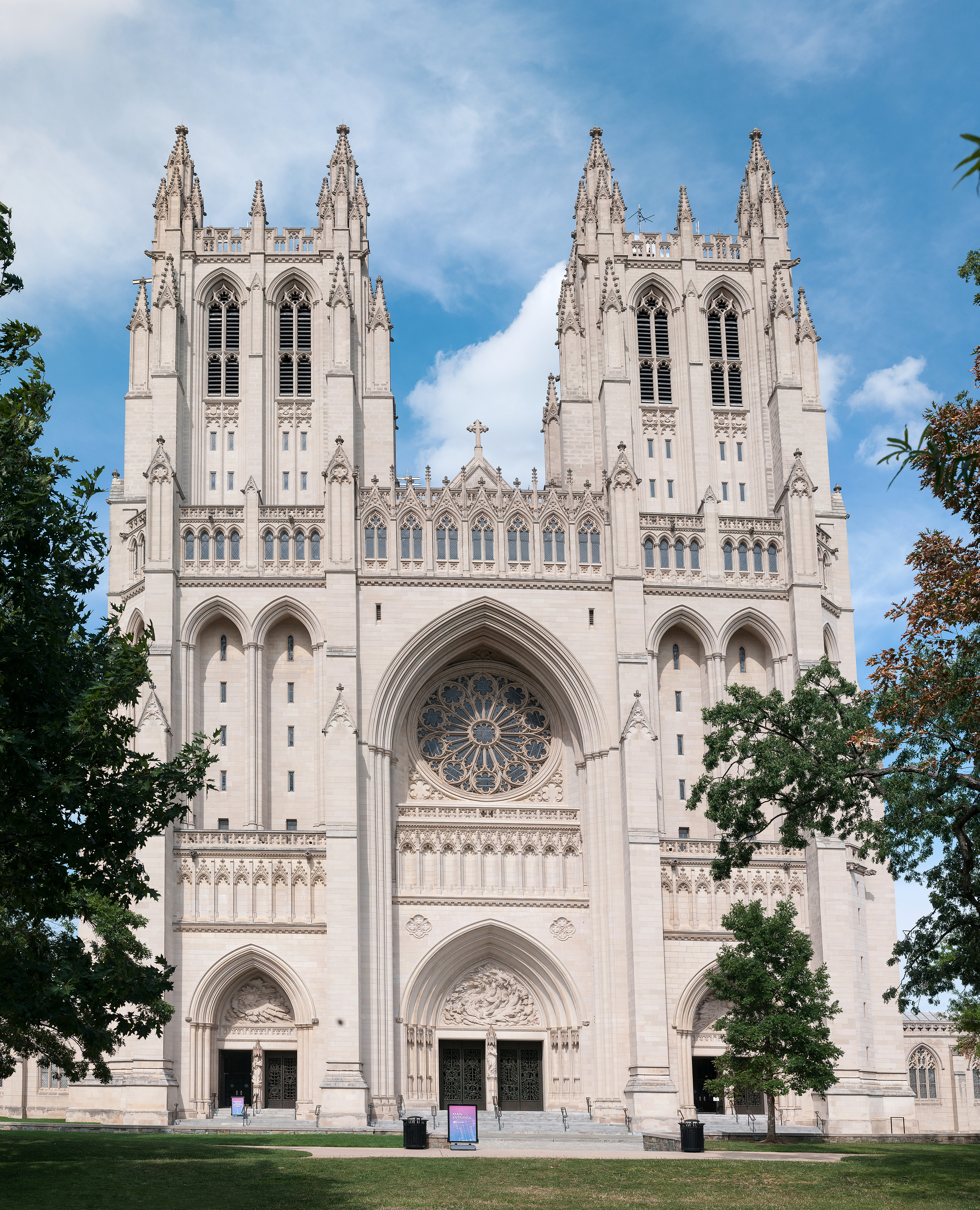
Washington National Cathedral, an Episcopal cathedral in Washington, D.C.

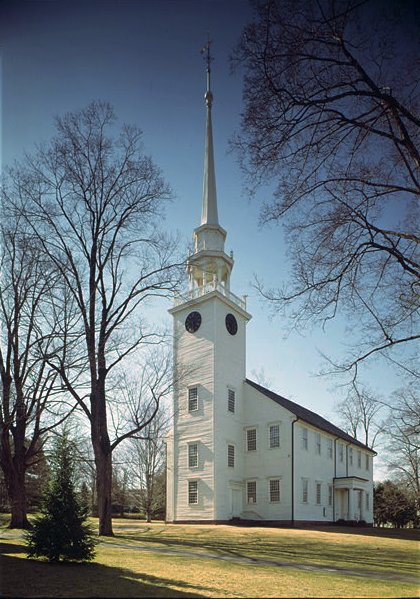
A Congregational church of the United Church of Christ denomination in Farmington, Connecticut

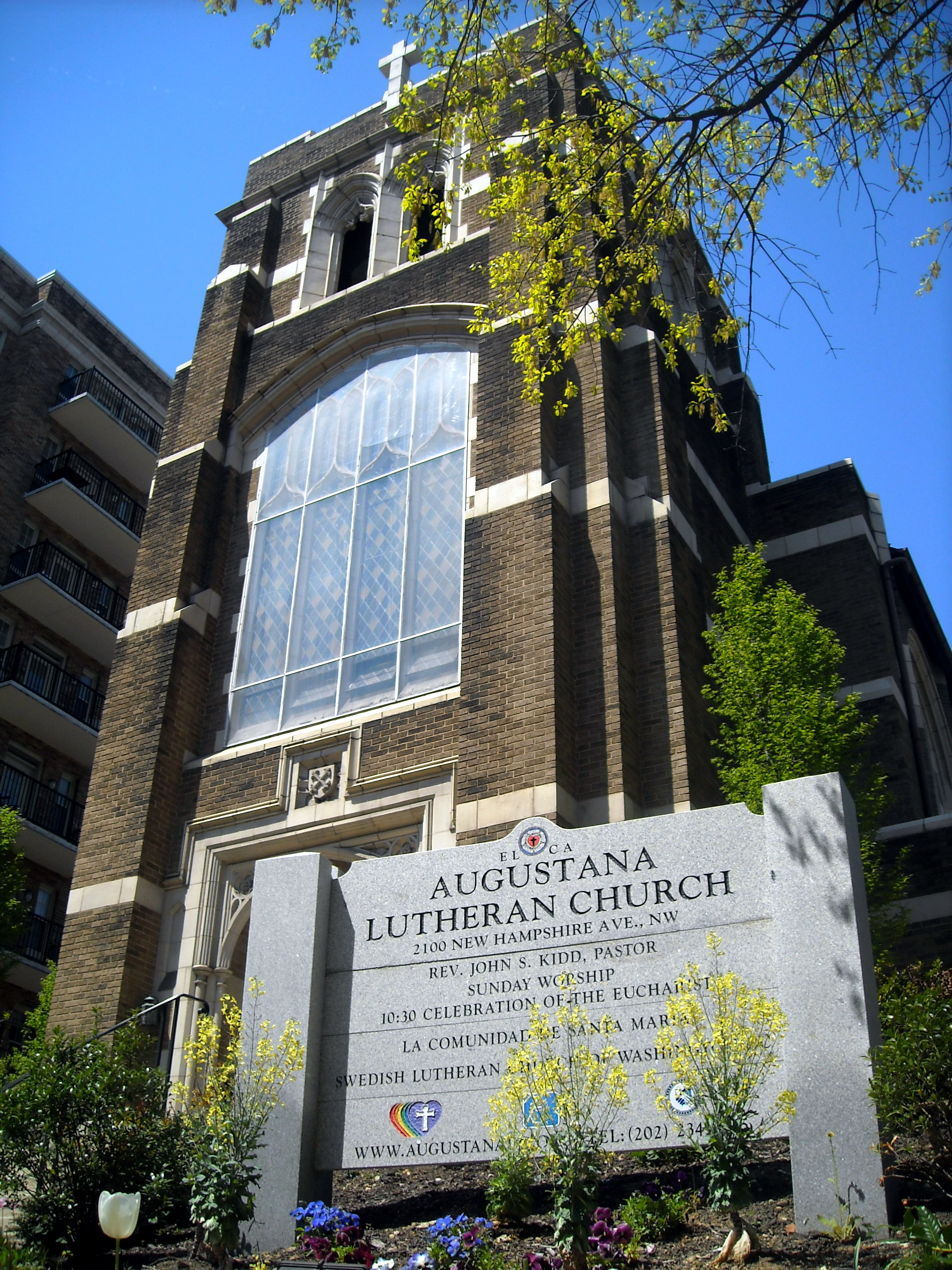
Augustana Lutheran Church in Washington, D.C., belonging to the Evangelical Lutheran Church in America

The largest Mainline churches are sometimes referred to as the "Seven Sisters of American Protestantism," a term apparently coined by William Hutchison. The "Seven Sisters" are:

- United Methodist Church (UMC) is the largest Mainline Protestant denomination among the "Seven Sisters" with 4.8 million members in the United States in 2025, and approximately 11.3 million worldwide.
- Evangelical Lutheran Church in America (ELCA) is the second largest Mainline denomination with approximately 2.6 million baptized members and 8,200 congregations at the end of 2025.
- Episcopal Church (TEC) is third largest, with 1.4 million active baptized members, of whom 1.39 million members were located in the United States in 2022.
- American Baptist Churches USA (ABCUSA) is fourth in size, with approximately 1.1 million members (2017).
- Presbyterian Church (USA) (PCUSA) is the fifth largest Mainline denomination, with 1.0 million active members in 8,300 congregations (2025).
- United Church of Christ (UCC) is the sixth and has about 710,000 members in 2022.
- Christian Church (Disciples of Christ) (DOC) is the seventh and has about 278,000 members as of 2022.

The term 'Mainline' has also been applied to Canadian Protestant churches that share common origins with their US counterparts such as the:

- United Church of Canada 325,315 members (2023), 1.2 million adherents according to 2021 Canadian Census
- Anglican Church of Canada 294,931 members (2022), 1.1 million adherents according to 2021 Canadian Census
- Evangelical Lutheran Church in Canada 111,570 members (2015)
- Canadian Baptist Ministries 81,685 members
- Presbyterian Church in Canada 79,961 members (2019)
- Christian Church (Disciples of Christ) in Canada (Note: The Christian Church (Disciples of Christ) in Canada is both a region of the Christian Church (Disciples of Christ) in the United States and Canada and a national church with membership in the World Council of Churches, Canadian Council of Churches, and other ecumenical organizations.) 2,606 members

The Association of Religion Data Archives, Pew Research, and other sources also consider these denominations, listed with adherents and members, to be Mainline:

- Cooperative Baptist Fellowship 700,000 members
- Religious Society of Friends (Quakers) 377,557 members (2017), of whom 80,092 are in the United States.
- Mennonite Church USA 100,000 members
- Church of the Brethren 87,181 members (2021)
- Reformed Church in America 80,675 members (2025)
- International Council of Community Churches 69,276 members (2009)
- National Association of Congregational Christian Churches 65,392 members (2002) (Note: The National Association of Congregational Christian Churches is considered to be evangelical by Pew Research while the Association of Religion Data Archives considered it to be mainline.)
- Alliance of Baptists 65,000 members
- Moravian Church in North America 60,000 members
- Universal Fellowship of Metropolitan Community Churches 40,000 members worldwide (2025)
- Latvian Evangelical Lutheran Church in America 12,000 members (2007)
- Estonian Evangelical Lutheran Church Abroad 8,000 members
- Hungarian Reformed Church in America 6,080 members

These same sources also consider "Mainline" other denominations outside the US, including:

- Anglican Church of Mexico 100,000 members
- Mennonite Church Canada 31,000 members
- The term is also occasionally used to refer to historic Protestant churches in Europe, Latin America, and South Africa. It has also been applied globally.

Historically Black churches are usually categorized differently from evangelicals or Mainline. However, in 2014 the Christian Century identified that these groups "fit the Mainline description."

- African Methodist Episcopal Church 2.5 million
- African Methodist Episcopal Zion Church 1.4 million
- Christian Methodist Episcopal Church 1.2 million members (2025)

Though not listed as Mainline in either the Association of Religion Data Archives or the Pew Research classifications, two groups also appeal to this label.

- The practices of the Community of Christ (Latter Day Saint movement), with 250,000 adherentes, are typified as congruent with Mainline Protestantism.
- While no longer exclusively Christian, the Unitarian Universalist Association, with 152,958 members and religious education enrollees as of 2024, has been labeled as Mainline or congruent with the Mainline tradition by the UUA, some UU congregations, and data analysts. Roughly 1.7 million Americans identify as Unitarian Universalist (including those in the UUA denomination).

Some denominations with similar names and historical ties to the Seven Sisters Mainline groups are not considered Mainline: The Southern Baptist Convention (SBC) [12.7 million], Lutheran Church–Missouri Synod (LCMS) [1.7 million], the Churches of Christ and Christian churches [1.1 million each], the Presbyterian Church in America (PCA) [0.4 million], the Anglican Church in North America (ACNA) [0.13 million], and the Conservative Congregational Christian Conference (CCCC) [0.04 million]. After the recent split of the UMC, the Global Methodist Church (GMC) could be added to this list, though no official census is currently known. Since these groups are too theologically conservative to be considered Mainline, those strictly adhering to historical rules of faith are grouped as confessional, while those without are grouped as evangelical. The Institute on Religion and Democracy considers these denominations to be "Mainline-adjacent" due to their origins in the Mainline Protestant denominations.

=== Ecumenical relations ===
Mainline denominations' relations of Full communion
blue representing US-American churches and red representing Canadian churches

UCCan
CC(DOC)
UCC

PCC	ELCIC
EELK	LELBA
Lutheran; World; Federation
PC(USA)
A Formula of Agreement
ELCA
RCA
ABCUSA	AMEZ

ACC
Waterloo Declaration	Anglican; Communion
MCNA
Churches; Beyond; Borders
Called to Common Mission
TEC
UMC
CME
AME

== Theology ==
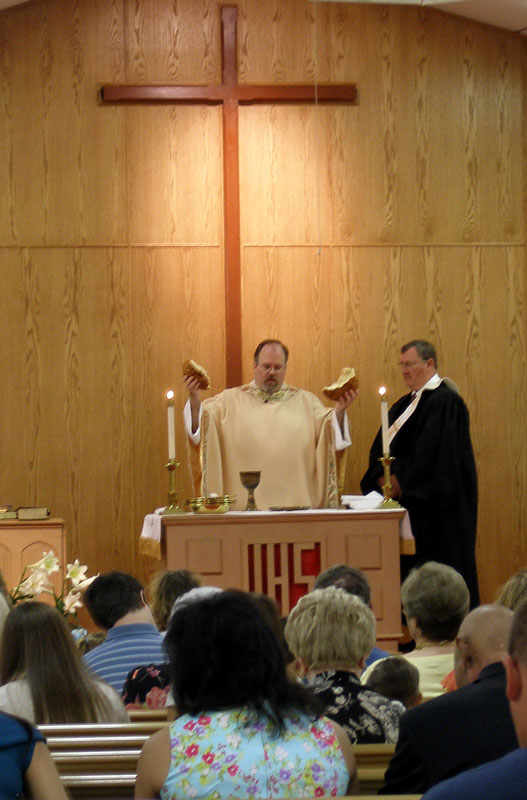
Eucharist observed by a congregation of the United Methodist Church, a typical Mainline Protestant denomination and one of the "Seven Sisters of American Protestantism"

=== Variation ===
Mainline Protestantism is characterized by theological and ideological pluralism. While doctrinal standards and confessional statements exist, these are not usually interpreted in ways to exclude people from membership. Richard Hutcheson Jr. said that clergy candidates were more likely to be rejected due to "excessive narrowness" than for violating confessional standards.

Mainline churches hold a range of theological orientations—conservative, moderate and liberal. About half of Mainline Protestants describe themselves as liberal. Mainline Christian groups are often more accepting of other beliefs and faiths, affirm the ordination of women, and have become increasingly affirming of gay ordination. A 2021 Pew Research Center survey found that 56% of Mainline Protestants believe that non-Christians, including agnostics and atheists, can go to heaven, compared to around a fifth of evangelical Protestants and 38% of those who attend historically Black churches. Nearly one-third of Mainline Protestants call themselves conservative, and most local Mainline congregations have a strong, active conservative element. Mainline denominations are historically Trinitarian and proclaim Jesus Christ as Lord and Son of God.

In practice, Mainline churches tend to be theologically moderate and influenced by higher criticism, an approach used by scholars to separate the Bible's earliest historical elements from perceived later additions and intentional distortions. Mainline denominations generally teach that the Bible is God's Word in function, but that it must be interpreted both through the lens of the cultures in which it was originally written, and examined using God-given reason. A 2008 survey conducted by the Pew Research Center found that 22 percent of the 7,500 Mainline Christians surveyed said the Bible is God's Word and is to be interpreted as literally true, word for word. Thirty-eight percent thought that the Bible is God's Word but is not to be taken literally, word for word. Twenty-eight percent said the Bible was not the Word of God but was of human origin.

Richard Hutcheson, Jr. wrote that conservative Mainline Protestants have felt alienated because leadership of denominational agencies and bureaucracies has often been theologically and socially liberal. This dissatisfaction has led to the formation of various Confessing Movements or charismatic renewal movements which are more conservative in tone.

=== Social justice ===
The Mainline denominations emphasize the biblical concept of justice, stressing the need for Christians to work for social justice, which usually involve politically liberal approaches to social and economic problems. Early in the 20th century, they actively supported the Social Gospel.

Mainline churches were basically pacifistic before 1940, but under the influence of people such as Reinhold Niebuhr they supported World War II and the Cold War. They have been far from uniform in their reaction to issues of gender and sexuality, though they tend to be more accepting than the Catholic Church or the more conservative Protestant churches.

== Social issues ==
Many Mainline denominations are active in voicing perspectives on social issues. Almost all Mainline denominations are gender-inclusive and ordain women.

Politically, Mainline churches are also active. While no particular candidate can be endorsed, Mainline churches often invite political speakers. Then New York mayoral candidate (and eventual mayor) Zohran Mamdani was invited to address the congregations at First Baptist Church of Crown Heights and Greater Allen Cathedral (affiliated with the African Methodist Episcopal Church, a historically Black denomination which also identifies as Mainline) in 2025.

=== Abortion ===
The Episcopal Church (TEC), Presbyterian Church (USA) (PCUSA), Unitarian Universalist Association (UUA), and United Church of Christ (UCC) are members of the Religious Coalition for Reproductive Choice. The United Methodist Church (UMC) and Evangelical Lutheran Church in America (ELCA) support exceptions, when abortion may be necessary, but do not endorse the procedure. Other denominations, such as the Church of the Brethren and Mennonite Church USA, are against abortion.

=== Human sexuality ===
In the context of the gay liberation movement and the declassification of homosexuality as a disease by the American Psychiatric Association in 1973, these studies prompted various Progressive Christians churches and denominations to recognize the rights of LGBTQ people within the Church and in society. In some denominations, this recognition has come through the development of affirming networks of churches, universities and seminaries. These include American Baptists Concerned for Sexual Minorities in 1972 (replaced by the Association of Welcoming and Affirming Baptists in 1993) by members of the American Baptist Churches USA, UCC Coalition for Lesbian/Gay Concerns in 1972 (renamed Open and Affirming Coalition UCC in 2014) by members of the United Church of Christ, Lutherans Concerned for Gay People in 1974 (renamed ReconcilingWorks in 2012) by members of the Evangelical Lutheran Church in America, Presbyterians for Gay Concerns in 1974 and More Light Churches Network in 1992 (merged and renamed More Light Presbyterians in 1999) by members of the Presbyterian Church (USA), Affirmation: United Methodists for Lesbian/Gay Concerns in 1975 and Reconciling Ministries Network in 1984 by members of the United Methodist Church, Brethren Mennonite Council for LGBT Interests and Supportive Communities Network in 1976 by members of the Mennonite Church USA. Some of these networks have become international, such as the Association of Welcoming and Affirming Baptists and Reconciling Ministries Network. Most Mainline Protestant denominations allow for the ordination LGBTQ ministers.

=== Marriage ===
In the context of the legalization of same-sex marriage in various countries and US states during the 2000s, conceptual research into the meaning of marriage commitment in biblical texts prompted various churches to consider that the basis of Christian marriage and sexuality is to remain faithful in a covenant with one's spouse, regardless of gender. After national reflection, many Progressive Christian denominations began to allow the blessing of same-sex marriage, usually leaving it to each local church to decide. After the legalization of same-sex marriage in the Netherlands in April 2001, the Mennonite Church in the Netherlands was one of the first to pass this resolution that same year. Similar resolutions have taken place on other continents, such as in the Evangelical Church of the River Plate in South America in 2010, in the Uniting Presbyterian Church in Southern Africa in 2015, in the Uniting Church in Australia in 2018.

== Statistical decline ==
=== United States ===
The proportion of Americans who are Mainline Protestants has declined by about two-thirds since 1972, and is forecast to further decline with the number of surviving baby boomers.

Protestant churches as a whole have slowly declined in total membership since the 1960s. As the national population has grown these churches have shrunk from 63% of the population in 1970 to 54% by 2000, and 40% in 2024, ceasing to be the religious category for the majority of Americans. American affiliation with Mainline denominations declined from 55% of all Protestants in 1973 to 29% in 2024. The number of Mainline congregations in the U.S. declined from more than 80,000 churches in the 1950s to about 72,000 in 2008. Robert Drinan estimated that there may have been a hundred million Mainline Protestants at one time in the United States.

Various causes of Mainline decline in population have been cited. Much analysis has taken place both from those within and outside Mainline denominations. Key factors indicate that all types of churches can and do grow, regardless of hymnody or contemporary music, type of liturgy, average age of worshiper, or location On average, however, churches in rural areas, churches with older congregants, and churches with fewer young people involved struggle most to add members and grow churches. For example, of all churches founded since 1993, 54% are experiencing growth, compared to 28% of congregations founded prior to 1900. As demographics change, the churches founded by earlier generations often struggle to adapt to changing conditions, including the declines or shifts in the age and ethnicity of local populations. Says David Roozen, Director of Hartford Seminary's Hartford Institute for Religion Research, "Location, Location, Location used to be the kind way that researchers described the extent to which the growth or decline of American congregations was captive to the demographic changes going on in their immediate neighborhoods." Age demographics are also a real factor in congregational decline, with the birthrate for Mainline Protestants well below what is needed to maintain membership numbers.

The Barna Group, an Evangelical surveyor, has noted that Protestant pastors who serve Mainline churches serve on average half as long as Protestant pastors in non-Mainline churches. This may be influenced by the United Methodist Church practice of Itinerancy, where clergy are intentionally moved from one church to another as often as yearly in an effort to support and encourage the United Methodist tradition of strong lay ministry. Mainline churches have also had difficulty attracting minorities, particularly Hispanics. As of 2024, Hispanics comprise 6 percent of the Mainline population but 19.5 percent of the US population. According to the Barna Group report, the failure of Mainline Protestants to add substantial numbers of Hispanic people is significant, given rapid increases in the US Hispanic population and ex-Catholics' preference for evangelical or Pentecostal Protestant churches.

One of the largest factors in the decline of both Mainline and other forms of Protestant churches is the rapid rise of non-denominational Christianity, which is almost entirely Evangelical Protestant. In 1972, fewer than 3% of Americans identified as non-denominational, while over 13% did in 2020, nearly half of the population of Americans that no longer identify with Mainline Protestantism. As of 2020, non-denominational Christians made up the second largest religious tradition in the United States after Catholics, even ahead of traditionally conservative denominations with steadier membership rates. Factors attributed to this trend include:

- The overtly evangelistic tradition of non-denominational churches, which gained over 9,000 congregations between 2010 and 2020 even while other denominations maintained or lost congregations.
- Defections of entire congregations instead of simple church planting, which tends to take longer to gain members. Data shows that between 2005 and 2015, over 8,000 established churches (primarily of Southern Baptist Convention persuasion but relatively split between denominations as a whole) chose to unaffiliate with their churches and become independent.
- The rise of nondenominational publishers and parachurch organizations whose content tend to culturally dominate large swaths of the Protestant community regardless of denomination.
- Political disagreement with the growing cultural progressivism of Mainline Protestantism, which has led to both a large rise in nondenominational Christians and schisms within several of the Mainline Protestant churches.

==== Contrast with other Protestant denominations ====
While various Protestant denominations have experienced declining membership, the most pronounced changes have occurred among mainline churches. Demographic trends for evangelical and historically African-American churches have been more stable. According to the Pew Research Center, Mainline denominations could claim 11.5 percent of all US adults, compared to 23.1 percent who identified as evangelical in 2024.

Demographers Hout, Greeley, and Wilde have attributed the long-term decline in Mainline membership and the concomitant growth in the conservative Protestant denominations to four basic causes: birth rates; switching to conservative denominations; departure from Protestantism to "no religion" (i.e. secularization); and conversions from non-Protestant sources. In their analysis, by far the main cause is birth rates—low for the Mainline bodies, and high for the conservatives. The second most important factor is that fewer conservatives switch to Mainline denominations than before. Despite speculation to the contrary, Hout, Greeley, and Wilde argue that switching from a Mainline to a conservative denomination is not important in accounting for the trend, because it is fairly constant over the decades. Finally, conservative denominations have had a greater inflow of converts. Their analysis gives no support for the notion that theological or social conservatism or liberalism has much impact on long-term growth trends.

Evidence from the General Social Survey indicates that higher fertility and earlier childbearing among women from conservative denominations explains 76% of the observed trend: conservative denominations have grown their own. Mainline denomination members have the lowest birthrate among American Christian groups. Unless there is a surge of new members, rising death rates are predicted to diminish their ranks even further in the years ahead.

==== Trends ====
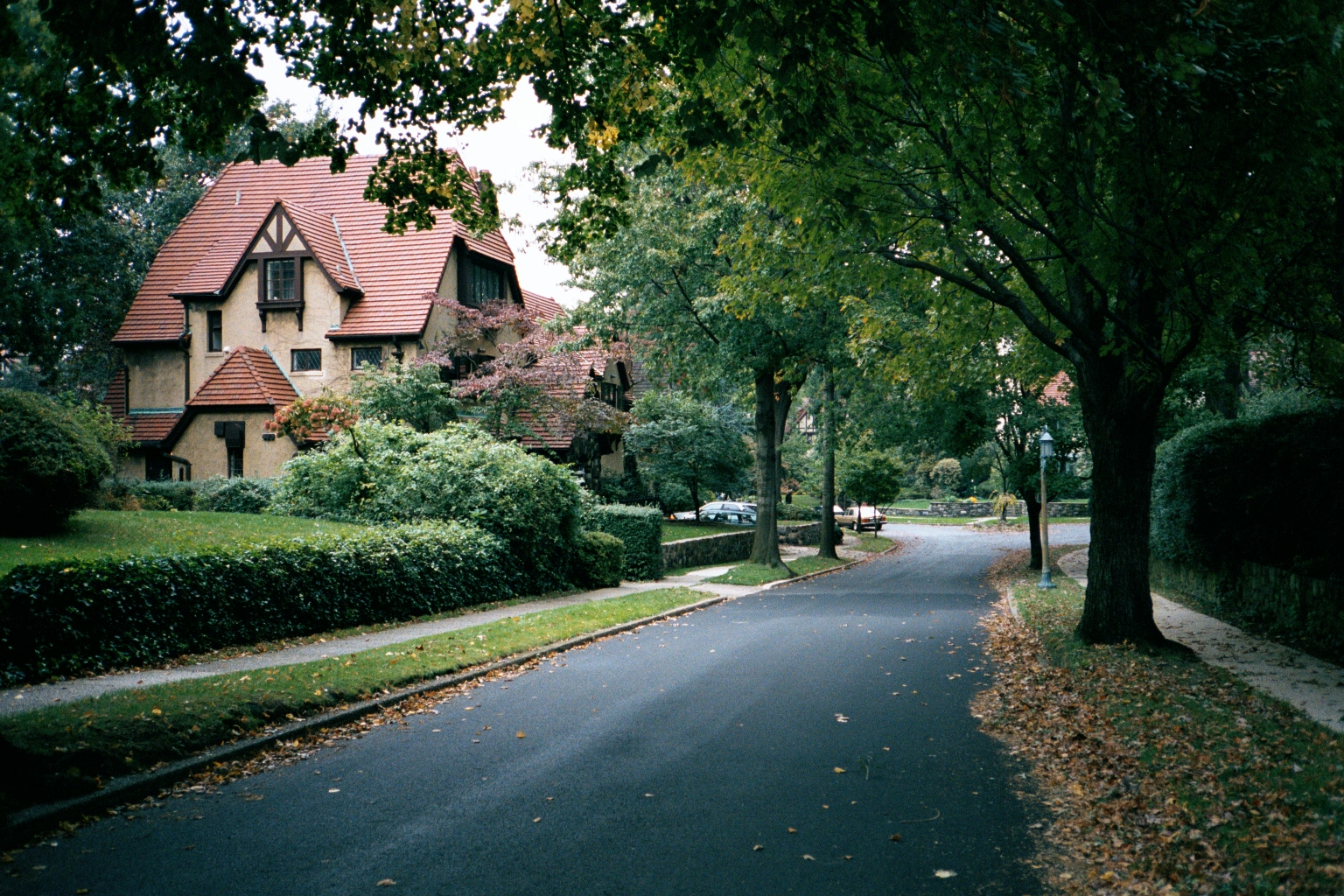
Forest Hills, Queens in New York City area is an affluent area with a population of wealthy Mainline Protestants.

Some other findings:

- From 1958 to 2008, Mainline church membership dropped by more than one-quarter to roughly 20 million people—15 percent of all American adults.
- From 1998 to 2008, there was a 22 percent drop in the percentage of adults attending Mainline congregations who have children under the age of 18 living in their home.
- In 2009, nearly 40 percent of Mainline church attendees were single. This increase has been driven higher by a rise in the number of divorced and widowed adherents.
- From 1998 to 2008, volunteerism dropped 21 percent; adult Sunday school participation decreased 17 percent.
- The average age of a Mainline pastor in 1998 was 48 and increased to 55 by 2009.
- Pastors on average remain with a congregation for four years compared to twice that length for non-Mainline church leaders.
- The decline in Mainline Protestant identification has been so steep that Evangelical identification has risen among Protestants, even as it has declined among all U.S. adults.

The Pew Research Center's 2023-2024 Religious Landscape Study provide additional explanations for the decline.

- Evangelical church members are younger than those in Mainline denominations. 14 percent of evangelical congregations are between 18 and 29 (compared to 11 percent of Mainline protestants), 30 percent between 30 and 49 (versus 24), 28 percent between 50 and 64 (versus 27), and 27 percent 65 or older (versus 38).

Not paralleling the decline in membership is the household income of members of Mainline denominations. Overall, it is higher than that of evangelicals:

- 25% reported less than a $30,000 income per year.
- 21% reported $30,000–$49,999 per year.
- 18% reported $50,000–$74,999 per year.
- 15% reported $75,000–$99,999 per year.
- 21% reported an income of $100,000 per year or more, compared to 13 percent of evangelicals.

== History ==
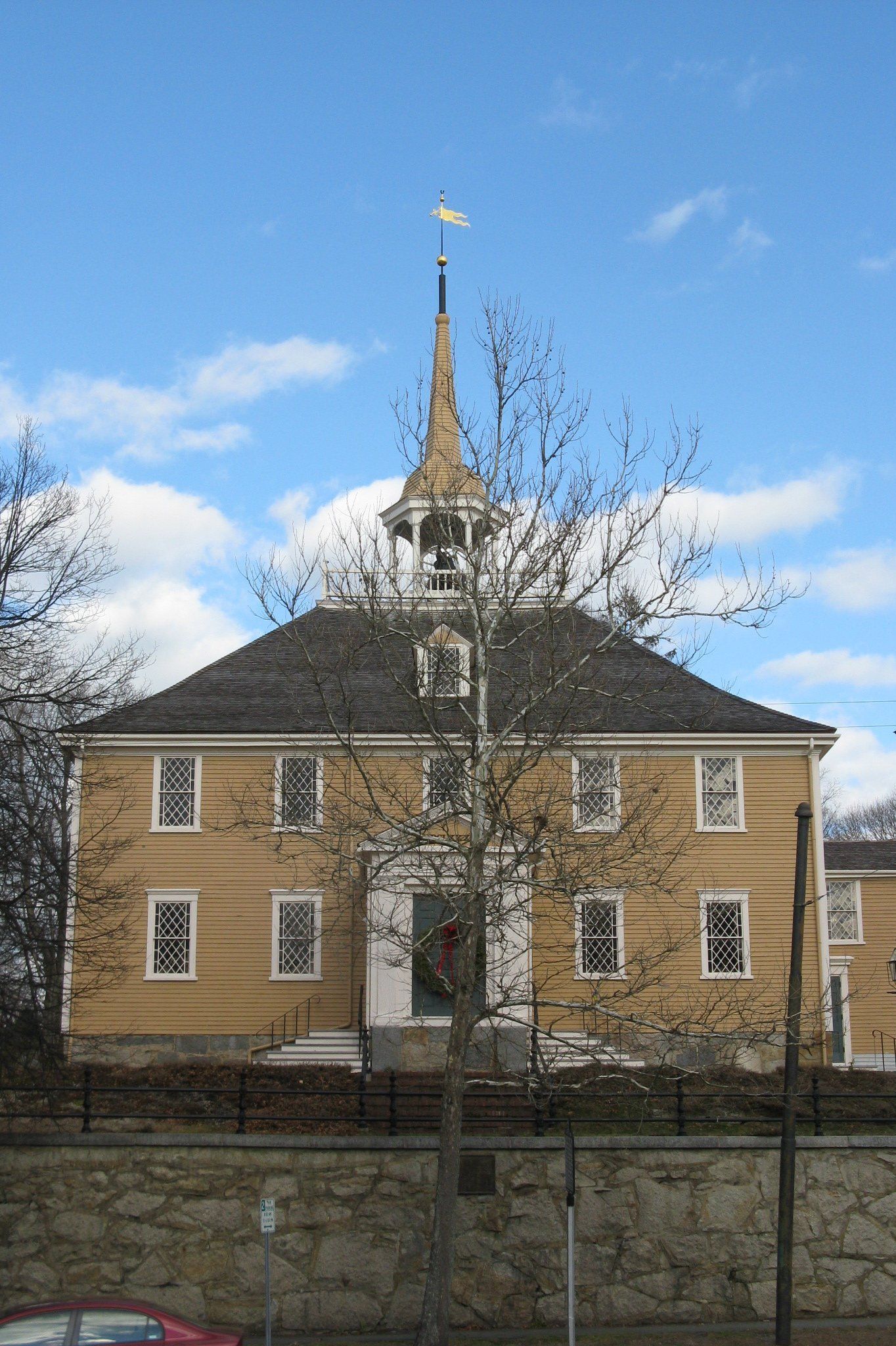
Old Ship Church, an old Puritan meetinghouse currently used by a Unitarian Universalist congregation

While the term "mainline" was not applied to churches until the 20th century, Mainline churches trace their history to the Protestant Reformation of the 16th century. The largest and most influential Protestant denominations in Britain's Thirteen Colonies were the Anglicans (after the American Revolution called Episcopalians) and the Congregationalists (from which the Unitarians would later split). These were later surpassed in size and influence by other Protestants: the Baptists, Presbyterians and Methodists. Sharing a common Reformation heritage with Episcopal and Congregational churches, these denominations together created the Mainline. It was, according to historian Jason Lantzer, "the emerging evangelical movement that would help forge the Seven Sisters and which provides a core to the wide variety of theological and doctrinal differences, shaping them into a more coherent whole."

The Great Awakening ignited controversy within Protestant churches between Old Lights and New Lights (or Old Side and New Side among Presbyterians). Led by figures such as the Congregationalist minister Charles Chauncy, Old Lights opposed the evangelical revivalism at the heart of the Awakening, while New Lights, led by fellow Congregationalist minister Jonathan Edwards, supported the revivals and argued for the importance of having a conversion experience. By the 1800s, Chauncy's followers had drifted toward forms of theological liberalism, such as Universalism, Unitarianism and Transcendentalism.

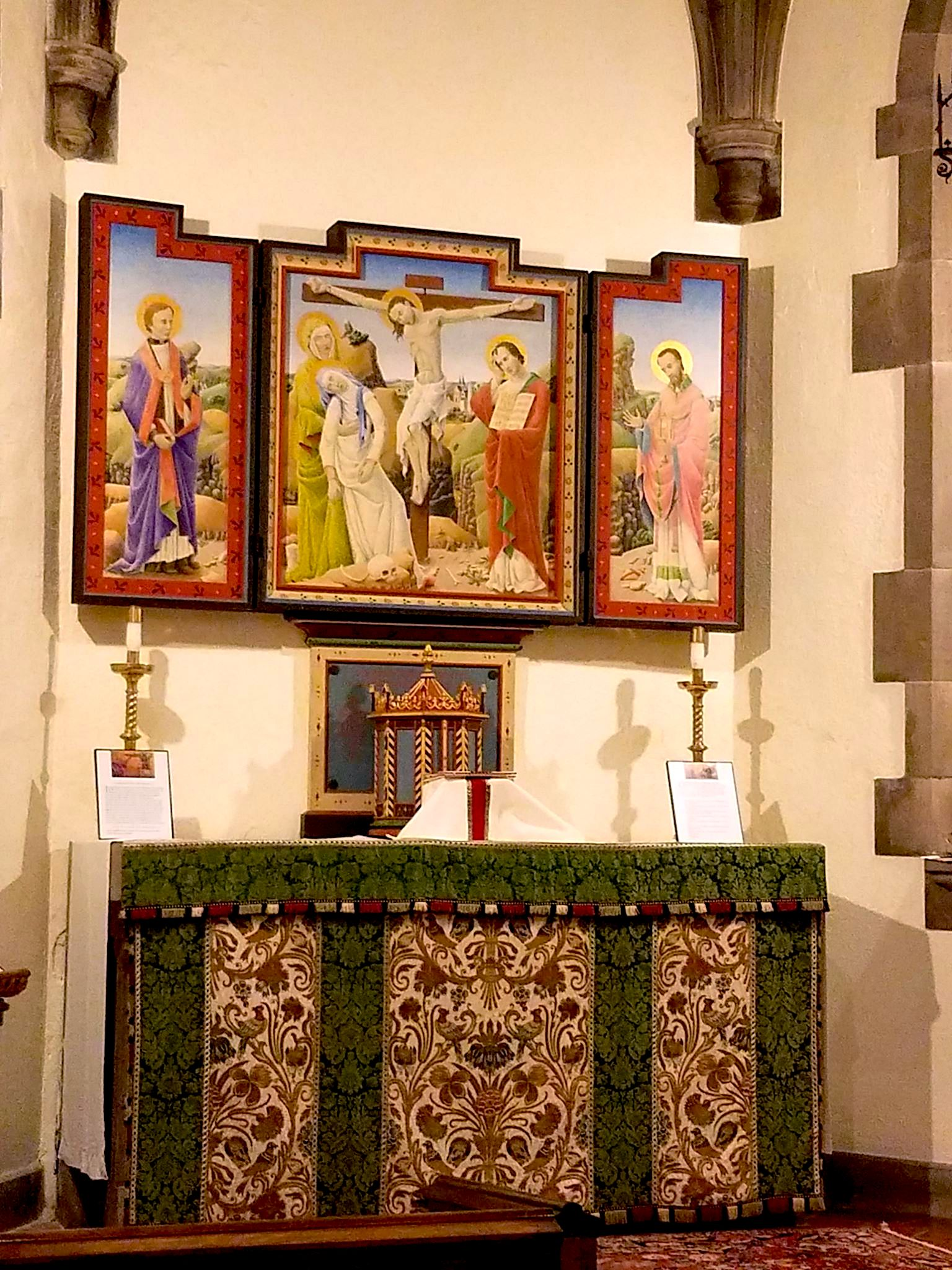
Lady Chapel in Church of the Good Shepherd, a 19th-century Anglo-Catholic Episcopal Church in Pennsylvania

The Second Great Awakening would inaugurate a period of evangelical dominance within American Mainline Protestantism that would last over a century. The Second Great Awakening was a catalyst for the reform of society. Efforts to improve the rights of women, reforming prisons, establishing free public schools, prohibiting alcohol, and (in the North) abolishing slavery were promoted by Mainline churches.

After the Civil War, however, tensions between evangelicals and non-evangelicals would re-emerge. As the practice of historical criticism spread to the United States, conflict over biblical inspiration erupted within Protestant churches. Conservative Protestants led by A. A. Hodge, B. B. Warfield and other Princeton theologians argued for biblical inerrancy, while liberal theologians such as Charles A. Briggs of Union Theological Seminary were open to using historical criticism to understand the Bible.

As 19th–century evangelicals embraced dispensational premillennialism and retreated from society in the face of mounting social problems caused by industrialization, urbanization and immigration, liberal Protestants embraced the Social Gospel, which worked for the "regeneration of society" rather than only the conversion of individuals.

The Fundamentalist–Modernist Controversy of the 1920s widened the division between evangelical and non-evangelical Protestants as the two sides fought for control over the Mainline denominations. The fundamentalists lost these battles for control to the modernists or liberals. Since the 1920s, Mainline churches have been associated with liberal Protestantism.

Episcopalians and Presbyterian WASPs tend to be considerably wealthier and better educated than most other religious groups in America, and are disproportionately represented in the upper reaches of American business, law and politics, and for many years were especially dominant in the Republican Party. Numbers of the wealthiest and most affluent American families, such as the Vanderbilts and Astors, Rockefeller, who were Baptists, Du Pont, Roosevelt, Forbes, Fords, Mellons, Whitneys, the Morgans and Harrimans are Episcopalian and Presbyterian families.

Through the 1940s and 1950s, neo-orthodoxy had become the prevailing theological approach within the Mainline churches. This neo-orthodox consensus, however, gave way to resurgent liberal theologies in the 1960s and to liberation theology during the 1970s.

=== Recent history ===
Mainline Protestants were a majority of Protestants in the United States until the mid-20th century. A dip in membership across all Christian denominations was more pronounced among Mainline groups, with the result that Mainline groups no longer comprise the majority. In 2020, Public Religion Research Institute conducted a religious census, based on self-identification, finding that an estimated 16% of U.S. Americans identified as non-Hispanic white Mainline Protestants, slightly outnumbering non-Hispanic white evangelical Protestants who were 14% of the American population. In 2014, Pew Research completed and published the Religious Landscape Survey in which it was estimated that 14.7% of American adults identified as Mainline Protestant, excluding historically Black and African American denominations, while 25.4% identified as evangelical Protestants, also excluding membership in historically Black denominations. In 2025, Pew Research published an updated Religious Landscape Survey, finding that 11% of American adults identified as Mainline Protestant while 23% identified as evangelical Protestants.

Mainline churches share an active approach to social issues that often leads to cooperation in organizations such as the National Council of Churches. Because of their involvement with the ecumenical movement, Mainline churches are sometimes (especially outside the United States) given the alternative label of ecumenical Protestantism. These churches played a leading role in the Social Gospel movement and were active in social causes such as the civil rights movement and the women's movement. As a group, the Mainline churches have maintained religious doctrine that stresses social justice and personal salvation. Members of Mainline denominations have played leadership roles in politics, business, science, the arts, and education. They were involved in the founding of leading institutes of higher education. Marsden argues that in the 1950s, "Mainline Protestant leaders were part of the liberal-moderate cultural mainstream, and their leading spokespersons were respected participants in the national conversation."

Some Mainline Protestant denominations have the highest proportion of graduate and post-graduate degrees of any other denomination in the United States. Some also include the highest proportion of those with some college education, such as the Episcopal Church (76%), the Presbyterian Church (U.S.A.) (64%), and the United Church of Christ (46%), as well as most of the American upper class. compared with the nationwide average of 50%. Episcopalians and Presbyterians also tend to be considerably wealthier and better educated than most other religious groups, and they were disproportionately represented in the upper reaches of US business and law until the 1950s.

In the 1990s four of the US Supreme Court Justices were Mainline Protestants: Sandra Day O'Connor, John Paul Stevens, William Rehnquist and David Souter.

From 1854 until at least 1964, Mainline Protestants and their descendants were heavily Republican. In recent decades, Republicans slightly outnumber Democrats.

From 1965 to 1988, Mainline church membership declined from 31 million to 25 million, then fell to 21 million in 2005. While in 1970 the Mainline churches claimed most Protestants and more than 30 percent of the population as members, today they are a minority among Protestants; in 2009, only 15 percent of Americans were adherents. A Pew Forum statistic revealed the same share in 2014.

==== Conservative factions ====
Recent efforts from theological conservatives have resisted the liberal drift of Mainline churches. Through social media, Confessing Movement groups within the Mainline denominations like Redeemed Zoomer's "Operation Reformation" have evangelized a conservative perspective to Generation Z.

==== Historical denominations ====
The Seven Sisters of Protestantism and their predecessors

Irish Presbyterians	Scottish Presbyterians	English Presbyterians	Baptists	English Independent Puritans	Dutch; Calvinists	Scottish; Anglicans	English Anglicans
Congregationalist churches (1620s)
Presbyterian independent congregations (1700s)	Baptist churches (1630s)
Presbytery of Philadelphia (1706)
German Lutherans
Synod of Philadelphia (1717)
The Old Side–New Side controversy	Conjunct Presbyteries (Note: The "New Side") (1741)	First Great Awakening	Lutheran ministries (1740s)
Presbytery of New York (1745)
Reformed; Presbyterians	Seceders	Synod of New York (1745)
Synod of N.Y. & Phila. (1758)	German Calvinists	DRC (1754)
german congregations separated from the dutch oversight
PC-USA (1789)	Left Presbyterianism and founded the Restoration movement	UCA (1793)	Some congregations became unitarian	RCUS (1793)	PECUSA (1785)	MEC (1784)
Second Great Awakening	Springfield Presbytery (1803)
CPC (1810)	CAW (1809)	Christian Connection (1804)	Triennial Convention (1814)
The Old School–New School controversy	AUA (Note: non-trinitarian) (1825)	RPDC (1819)	MPC (1828)	General Synod (1820)
PC-USA (Old School) (1837)	New School (1837)	**DOC** (1832)	German pietist protestant churches
SBC (Note: Unlike other Southern denominations, it never reunited with its Northern counterpart and is not seen as mainline while it is the largest Protestant denomination in the US) (1845)	Norwegian Lutherans	Swedish Lutherans
UPCNA (1858)	United Synod (South) (1858)
North-South divide	PC-CSA (1861)	PECCSA (1861)	Church of Hawaii (1862) (Note: The Hawaiian Kingdom was still an independent state as this point)	MEC, S (1861)	ALS (1860)
PCUS (1864)	GSELCCSA (1863)
PC-USA (1869)	NCCCUS (1865)	RCA (1867)	PECUSA (1865)	Danish Lutherans	General Council (1867)	ELGSNA (1866)
2/3 of the CPC reunited	ESNA (1872)	Hungarian; Calvinists	DELKA (1878)	ELGSS (1876)	Finnish Lutherans
PC-USA (1906)	NBC (1907)	Hungarian; Reformed; Classis (1896)	PECUSA (1898)	Mennonites	Blair Church (1896)	United Synod of the South (1886)	Suomi Synod (1890)	ELASNA (1894)
RCUS (1921)	NLCA (1917)	ULCA (1918)
CCC (1931)	E&R (1934)	Methodist Church (1939)	ALC (1930)
ABC (1950)	EUB (1946)	ELC (1946)	United Church (1946)	AELC (1948)
UPCUSA (1958)	**UCC** (1957)
UUA (Note: no longer exclusively Christian) (1961)	**UMC** (1968)	ALC (1960)	LCA (1962)
**ABCUSA** (1972)	**TEC** (1979)	AELC (1976)
**PC(USA)** (1983)	**ELCA** (1988)

italic: European mother churches, bold: Seven Sisters of American Protestantism, dotted lines represent unorganized movements and continuing churches outside the mainline tradition

Anglican, Baptist, Congregationalist, Continental Reformed, Lutheran, Methodist, Presbyterian, Restorationist, Other/United

== Bibliography ==
- Allen, Irving Lewis (1975). "WASP—From Sociological Concept to Epithet". Ethnicity. 2 (2): 153–162. ISSN 0095-6139.
- Balmer, Randall H.; Winner, Lauren F. (2002). Protestantism in America. New York: Columbia University Press. ISBN 978-0-231-11130-0.
- Baltzell, E. Digby (1964). The Protestant Establishment.
- Coalter, Milton J.; Mulder, John M.; Weeks, Louis (1990). The Mainstream Protestant "Decline": The Presbyterian Pattern. Louisville, Kentucky: Westminster John Knox Press. ISBN 978-0-664-25150-5.
- Dorrien, Gary (2006). The Making of American Liberal Theology. Volume 3: Crisis, Irony, and Postmodernity. Louisville, Kentucky: Westminster John Knox Press. ISBN 978-0-664-22356-4.
- Dunderberg, Ismo (2008). Beyond Gnosticism: Myth, Lifestyle, and Society in the School of Valentinus. New York: Columbia University Press. doi:10.7312/dund14172. ISBN 978-0-231-51259-6. JSTOR 10.7312/dund14172.
- Fallding, Harold (1978). "Mainline Protestantism in Canada and the United States of America: An Overview". Canadian Journal of Sociology. 3 (2): 141–160. doi:10.2307/3340276. JSTOR 3340276.
- Hacker, Andrew (1957). "Liberal Democracy and Social Control". American Political Science Review. 51 (4): 1009–1026. doi:10.2307/1952449. JSTOR 1952449. S2CID 146933599.
- Hadaway, C. Kirk (2011). FACTs On Growth: 2010 (PDF). Hartford, Connecticut: Hartford Institute for Religion Research. Archived from the original (PDF) on June 30, 2014.
- Hadaway, C. Kirk; Marler, Penny Long (2006). "Growth and Decline in the Mainline". In Lippy, Charles H. (ed.). Faith in America: Changes, Challenges, New Directions. Volume 1: Organized Religion Today. Praeger Perspectives. Westport, Connecticut: Praeger Publishers. pp. 1–24. ISBN 978-0-275-98606-3.
- Hout, Michael; Greeley, Andrew; Wilde, Melissa J. (2001). "The Demographic Imperative in Religious Change in the United States". American Journal of Sociology. 107 (2): 468–500. doi:10.1086/324189. JSTOR 3081357. S2CID 143419130. Archived from the original on April 28, 2019.
- Hutcheson, Richard G Jr. (1981). Mainline Churches and the Evangelicals: A Challenging Crisis?. Atlanta, Georgia: John Knox Press. ISBN 978-0-8042-1502-2.
- Hutchison, William R., ed. (1989). Between the Times: The Travail of the Protestant Establishment in America, 1900–1960. Cambridge Studies in Religion and American Public Life. Cambridge, England: Cambridge University Press. ISBN 978-0-521-40601-7.
- Lantzer, Jason S. (2012). Mainline Christianity: The Past and Future of America's Majority Faith. New York: NYU Press. ISBN 978-0-8147-5330-9.
- Launius, Roger D. (1998). "The Reorganized Church, the Decade of Decision, and the Abilene Paradox". Dialogue: A Journal of Mormon Thought. 31 (1): 47–65. doi:10.2307/45226417. JSTOR 45226417.
- Linder, Ellen W., ed. (2009). Yearbook of American & Canadian Churches 2009. Nashville, Tennessee: Abingdon Press. ISBN 978-0-687-65880-0. ISSN 0195-9034.
- Marsden, George (2014). The Twilight of the American Enlightenment: The 1950s and the Crisis of Liberal Belief. New York: Basic Books. ISBN 978-0-465-03010-1.
- Marty, Martin E. (1980). A Nation of Behavers. University of Chicago Press. ISBN 978-0-226-50892-4.
- McKinney, William (1998). "Mainline Protestantism 2000". The Annals of the American Academy of Political and Social Science. 558: 57–66. doi:10.1177/0002716298558001006. JSTOR 1049104. S2CID 144644587.
- Moorhead, James H. (1999). World Without End: Mainstream American Protestant Visions of the Last Things, 1880–1925. Religion in North America. Bloomington, Indiana: Indiana University Press. ISBN 978-0-253-33580-7.
- Noll, Mark A. (1992). A History of Christianity in the United States and Canada. Grand Rapids, Michigan: Wm. B. Eerdmans Publishing Company. ISBN 978-0-8028-0651-2.
- Pew Forum on Religion & Public Life (2008a). U.S. Religious Landscape Survey: Religious Affiliation: Diverse and Dynamic (PDF). Washington, DC: Pew Research Center. Archived from the original (PDF) on April 17, 2017.
- ——— (2008b). U.S. Religious Landscape Survey: Religious Beliefs and Practices: Diverse and Politically Relevant (PDF). Washington, DC: Pew Research Center. Archived from the original (PDF) on September 29, 2017.
- Pew Research Center (2015a). A Deep Dive Into Party Affiliation: Sharp Differences by Race, Gender, Generation, Education. Washington, DC: Pew Research Center.
- ——— (2015b). America's Changing Religious Landscape: Christians Decline Sharply as Share of Population; Unaffiliated and Other Faiths Continue to Grow. Washington, DC: Pew Research Center.
- Roozen, David A. (2004). Oldline Protestantism: Pockets of Vitality Within a Continuing Stream of Decline. Hartford Institute for Religion Research Working Paper. Hartford, Connecticut: Hartford Institute for Religion Research. 1104.1.
- Thompson, Michael G. (2007). "An Exception to Exceptionalism: A Reflection on Reinhold Niebuhr's Vision of 'Prophetic' Christianity and the Problem of Religion and U.S. Foreign Policy". American Quarterly. 59 (3): 833–855. doi:10.1353/aq.2007.0070. JSTOR 40068452. S2CID 145379028.
- Vanel, Chrystal (Fall 2017). "Community of Christ: An American Progressive Christianity, with Mormonism as an Option". Dialogue: A Journal of Mormon Thought. 50 (3): 89–114. doi:10.5406/dialjmormthou.50.3.0089.
- Walsh, Andrew D. (2000). Religion, Economics, and Public Policy: Ironies, Tragedies, and Absurdities of the Contemporary Culture Wars. Westport, Connecticut: Praeger Publishers. ISBN 978-0-275-96611-9.
- Wuthnow, Robert; Evans, John H. (2002). The Quiet Hand of God: Faith-Based Activism and the Public Role of Mainline Protestantism. Berkeley, California: University of California Press. ISBN 978-0-520-23313-3.
