= Anglican Communion and ecumenism =

Relationships between the Anglican church and other denominations

Anglican interest in ecumenical dialogue can be traced back to the time of the Reformation and dialogues with both Orthodox and Lutheran churches in the sixteenth century. In the nineteenth century, with the rise of the Oxford Movement, there arose greater concern for reunion of the churches of "Catholic confession". This desire to work towards full communion with other denominations led to the development of the Chicago–Lambeth Quadrilateral, approved by the Third Lambeth Conference of 1888. The four points (the sufficiency of scripture, as the "ultimate standard of faith", the historic creeds, the two dominical sacraments, and the historic episcopate) were stipulated as the basis for church unity, "a basis on which approach may be by God's blessing made towards Home Reunion".

Although they are not considered members, some non-Anglican bodies have entered into communion with the Anglican Communion as a whole or with its constituent member churches, such as the Old Catholic Church, the Lutheran Churches (including those within the Porvoo Communion, the Evangelical Lutheran Church in America, and the Evangelical Lutheran Church in Canada), as well as the Malankara Mar Thoma Syrian Church.

== Diplomatic ecumenism: quest for Christian unity ==
=== World Council of Churches ===
Ecumenical dialogue has been particularly fruitful in three realms. The first is the World Council of Churches and its predecessors, in which Anglicans have been involved from the first. Anglican representatives were particularly involved in the development of the seminal Faith and Order paper, Baptism, Eucharist, and Ministry, which sought to develop common ground concerning these issues, and have been at the centre of the process of developing recent work on the "Nature and Mission of the Church".

=== Roman Catholic Church ===
The second concerns dialogue with the Roman Catholic Church. Long-term hostility between the two Communions was engendered by resistance in England to the declaration of royal supremacy, the confiscation of Church properties, the dissolution of the monasteries, the execution of priests, forced attendance at Anglican worship, forced payment of tithes to the state church and the illegalization of the Catholic faith. There was a brief restoration of communion with Rome during the reign of Mary I. Her death marked the end of Catholic attempts to reconcile by law the English Church to Rome. Subsequently, Pope Pius V's excommunication of Elizabeth I in 1570 and authorization of rebellion against her contributed to official suspicion of the allegiances of English Catholics. This, combined with a desire to assert the claims of the established church, led initially to renewed persecution by the state, and to the continued enforcement of severe legal restrictions. Most of these restrictions endured for 250 years and were only relieved through several legislative reforms in the 19th century, cumulatively known as Catholic emancipation. The prohibition on Catholics succeeding to the British Crown (and by extension the other Commonwealth realms) remains in effect.

=== Lutheran and Old Catholic Churches ===
Anglican, Porvoo and Utrecht Communions

Another fruitful realm of dialogue has been with various Lutheran churches. An ecumenical report titled "On Closer Acquaintance" noted that Anglicans and Lutherans are "the closest ecumenical cousins in Christendom." On the doctrine of justification, the Anglican Consultative Council (ACC) "recognises that Anglicans and Lutherans share a common understanding of God’s justifying grace...that we are accounted righteous and are made righteous before God only by grace through faith because of the merits of our Lord and Saviour Jesus Christ, and not on account of our works or merits."

Historically, the Church of England and the state churches of current (and former) mainland European monarchies where Lutheran Protestantism was the official doctrine, have had amicable relations. This has, in part, been nurtured by marriages between members of the Royal Family of Great Britain and the royal (Protestant) houses of Europe, especially the descendants of Queen Victoria (whose husband, Prince Albert, was a Lutheran). Since the monarch of England cannot (even today), by law, be a Roman Catholic, and forming familial royal bonds was historically deemed necessary at times to form alliances (and prevent war) between countries, there was a natural tendency for British princes/princesses to wed Lutheran or Reformed (and therefore, not Roman Catholic) royals from the houses of Germany, the Netherlands and Scandinavia. Also, a general agreement on doctrine between the Anglican and Lutheran traditions has helped relations, at least between the mainstream movements. Also, the fact that both still retain a strong liturgical tradition has helped immensely, since they are essentially the only Western churches outside of Roman Catholicism which have maintained official liturgies; indeed, the liturgies of both bodies are often nearly identical in wording to each other (as is the Roman Catholic Mass) and, thus provide a familiar bond between members who visit between denominations.

In the late 20th century, the Porvoo Communion was formed, bringing the Anglican churches of England, Scotland, Wales, and Ireland and the Episcopal churches of Portugal and Spain into full communion with the Lutheran Church in Great Britain, the Lutheran churches of the Scandinavian countries (Iceland, Denmark, Finland, Norway, and Sweden), and the Lutheran churches of the Baltic countries (Estonia, Latvia, and Lithuania). In 2001, the Anglican Church of Canada and the Evangelical Lutheran Church in Canada achieved full communion through the Waterloo Declaration, as did the Episcopal Church in the United States and the Evangelical Lutheran Church in America under the joint document Called to Common Mission.

In addition, full communion agreements have been reached between various ecclesiastical provinces and smaller denominations such as the Old Catholic Church after the Bonn Agreement of 1931.

Full communions between Anglican, Lutheran and Old Catholic denominations
blue representing Anglican, red representing Old Catholic and green representing Lutheran churches, orange representing Saint Thomas Christian denominations

ELCC	ACC	other churches
Waterloo Declaration	Churches; Beyond; Borders	Porvoo Communion	Lutheran; World; Federation
MCNA	Anglican; Communion	C of E and others (Note: some of the communions shown here include the ACC and TEC)	MISC
Called to Common Mission
ELCA	TEC	Bonn Agreement	CoS	PIC	MTSC
ELKB	UU

=== Other Protestant denominations ===
Historical Anglicanism "followed the major continental Reformers in their doctrine of the true church, identifiable by the authentic ministry of word and sacrament, in their rejection of the jurisdiction of the pope, and in their alliance with the civil authority ('the magistrate')". The Church of England historically considered itself "Protestant and Reformed" and recognized as true churches the Continental Reformed Churches, participating in the Synod of Dort in 1618–1619.

Movements toward full communion between the Anglican Church of Canada and the United Church of Canada, as well as between the Church of England and the Methodist Church of Great Britain, were both derailed because of the issue of episcopacy, specifically, apostolic succession. The same problem applies to the Churches Uniting in Christ initiative in the United States. This, as well as Anglican stands on certain social issues such as the ordination of priests and bishops in public same-sex relationships and the practice of blessing gay unions, has likewise hindered dialogue between Anglicans and conservative evangelical Protestant denominations. This has not prevented a range of reports by bilateral commissions producing descriptions of converging theology and practice however, such as Conversations around the World (2005), a report of conversations between the representatives of the Anglican Communion and the Baptist World Alliance. In the Indian subcontinent, most Anglican churches have entered into formal union with other Protestant denominations, with the resulting United Protestant churches being a part of multiple communions, including the Anglican Communion and World Communion of Reformed Churches for example. These agreements, which date from the 1940s and 1950s, led to the creation of the Church of North India, the Church of South India, the Church of Pakistan and the Church of Bangladesh. The united churches maintain an episcopal and synodical structure and consecrate bishops in apostolic succession while incorporating distinctives from other traditions such as that of the Moderator, which comes from Presbyterianism. As a percentage of the total population in the region, these united churches are not significant, but aside from Bangladesh, they are numerically very substantial.

Those that did not join with the union agreements in the Indian subcontinent retained the name Anglican Church of India, or adopted a similar name containing "Anglican". The total membership of these churches has been estimated at 800,000. Most have recently entered into communion with churches of the Continuing Anglican Movement and have North American parishes.

Outside of Asia, direct consultations with other Protestant churches apart from Lutherans have, for the most part, been less fruitful. Movements toward full communion between the Anglican Church of Canada and the United Church of Canada were derailed because of the issue of episcopacy and the mutual recognition of ordained ministry (specifically, apostolic succession). The same issue blocked the first attempt at a covenant between the Church of England and the Methodist Church of Great Britain, but such a covenant was eventually signed in 2003. This issue also has held back the Churches Uniting in Christ initiative in the United States.

The issue of apostolic succession, as well as the willingness of some North American dioceses to offer partnership blessings and priestly ordination to people in same-sex sexual relationships, have hindered dialogue between Anglicans and other evangelical Protestant denominations.

=== Orthodox churches ===
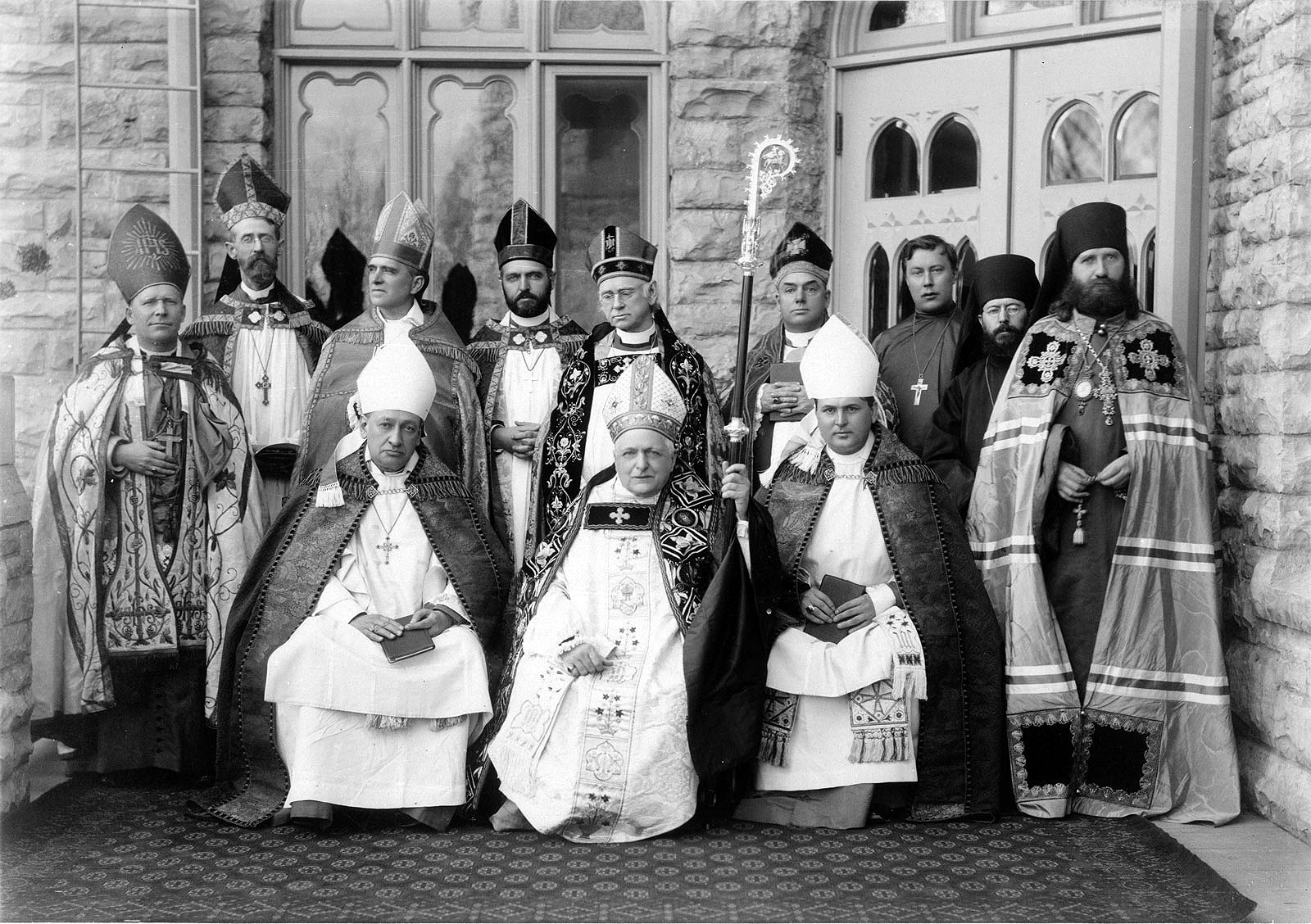
The consecration of Reginald Heber Weller as an Anglican bishop at the Cathedral of St. Paul the Apostle in the Episcopal Diocese of Fond du Lac, with bishop Anthony Kozłowski of the Polish National Catholic Church and the bishop Tikhon Bellavin (later Patriarch of Moscow; along with his chaplains John Kochurov and Sebastian Dabovich) of the Russian Orthodox Church present

Dialogue has also been fruitful with the Orthodox churches.

In 1922 the Ecumenical Patriarch of Constantinople Meletius IV recognised Anglican orders as valid. He wrote: "That the orthodox theologians who have scientifically examined the question have almost unanimously come to the same conclusions and have declared themselves as accepting the validity of Anglican Orders." In 1923, the synod of Constantinople affirmed the Patriarch's decision. Following the decision of Constantinople, the autocephalous Orthodox churches of Alexandria, Cyprus, Greece, Jerusalem, and Romania conditionally recognised that Anglican orders preserved apostolic succession. The reason for this conditionality was that from the Eastern Orthodox point of view, no Holy Orders outside of their own church could truly be valid without a complete church reunion.

Historically, some Eastern Orthodox bishops have assisted in the ordination of Anglican bishops; for example, in 1870, Alexander Lycurgus, the Greek Orthodox Archbishop of Syra and Tinos, was one of the bishops who consecrated Henry MacKenzie as the Suffragan Bishop of Nottingham.

In 1910, Raphael of Brooklyn, an Eastern Orthodox bishop, "sanctioned an interchange of ministrations with the Episcopalians in places where members of one or the other communion are without clergy of their own." Raphael stated that in places "where there is no resident Orthodox Priest", an Anglican priest could administer Marriage, Holy Baptism, and the Blessed Sacrament to an Orthodox layperson. In 1912, however, Bishop Raphael ended the intercommunion after becoming uncomfortable with the fact that the Anglican Communion contained different churchmanships within Her, e.g. High Church, Evangelical, etc.

The current International Commission of the Anglican-Orthodox Theological Dialogue was established in 1999, building on the work of earlier commissions, which had published their work in the Dublin Statement, and the Anglican Oriental Orthodox International Commission was established in 2001. Thus far, most common ground has been established only concerning matters of the historic creeds.

In a move parallel to the parishes of the pastoral provision in the Roman Catholic Church a small number of United States Anglicans have been received into certain jurisdictions of the Orthodox Church while retaining the use of a revision of the Prayer Book liturgy authorised for use in the Orthodox Church by Patriarch Tikhon of Moscow in the early twentieth century.

Regarding mutual recognition of ministry, the Eastern Orthodox Churches are reluctant to even consider the question of the validity of holy orders in isolation from the rest of the Christian faith, so in practice they treat Anglican ordinations as invalid. Thus the favourable judgement expressed by the Ecumenical Patriarch of Constantinople in 1922 and communicated by him to other Eastern Patriarchs (some of whom, including the Russian Patriarch, signed a contrary declaration in 1948) is in practice without effect. The Eastern Orthodox Church classifies Anglican clergymen who join it as laypeople, and, if they are to function as clergy, administers ordination to them.

=== Anglican churches outside the communion ===
A number of jurisdictions identify themselves as "Anglican" but are not in communion with Canterbury. They therefore are outside the Anglican Communion. Several, such as the Free Church of England and the Reformed Episcopal Church in the United States, left the Anglican Communion in the 1800s in reaction to the inroads of the Catholic Revival and the controversy it produced in the church over ritualism.

Later, during the 1960s and 1970s, disagreements with certain provincial bodies – chiefly in North America and in the United Kingdom – over such issues as prayer book revision, the remarriage of divorced persons, the ordination of women, and the acceptance by a few of the bishops of homosexual relationships led to another and quite different schism. These Anglican churches are usually called "Continuing Anglican churches" because of their determination to preserve (or "continue") the episcopate in apostolic succession, as well as the faith, worship, and teaching of traditional Anglicanism and historical Christianity – which they believe the Anglican Communion has deviated from. The older Reformed Episcopal churches maintained the lineage of bishops without accepting the idea that sacraments are valid only if administered by clergy in such a lineage.

There are also independent jurisdictions unrelated to the preceding schisms. The Church of England in South Africa is conservative, long-established, and has a substantial membership. It is separate from the Anglican Church of Southern Africa, which is part of the Anglican Communion. Other churches, however, have adopted the Anglican name, the Book of Common Prayer, Anglican vestments, and – in some cases – the Thirty-Nine Articles of Religion, but have no historic connection to the Anglican Communion. Unlike the socially conservative Continuing Anglican churches and the Church of England in South Africa, some of these tiny jurisdictions are openly oriented towards the gay and lesbian community and do ordain women clergy.

Given the range of concerns and the grounds for schism, there is as much diversity in the theological and liturgical orientations of the free churches, the Continuing Anglican churches, and the independent Anglican bodies as there is among churches of the Anglican Communion. Some are evangelical, others charismatic and evangelical, and yet others are Anglo-Catholic. What they have in common is a conviction that mainstream Anglicanism in North America, the United Kingdom, and elsewhere has departed from acceptable principles of belief or practice, or both.

== Practical ecumenism: joint worship ==
Ecumenical joint worship from an Episcopalian–Anglican perspective in North America takes one of the following forms:

1. An Anglican church rents space to another church.
2. An Anglican church is part of an ecumenical centre. One type of centre is much like a shopping plaza where the various churches share one physical building but maintain separate spaces and, possibly, separate entrances. The other type of ecumenical centre consists of a common hall or space that various churches or faiths occupy on a schedule. For example, the first ecumenical church in Canada was built in 1968 in Whistler, British Columbia.
3. An Anglican church shares a church building and worship space with another church on a fortnightly rotation. One Sunday, the service is Anglican. Next Sunday, the service is of the other church. The congregation can be almost identical on each Sunday so that it is the leaders and style that change. This usually occurs in small and remote communities but there are city examples. For example, St Mark's Anglican Church/Trinity United Church in Vancouver.
4. An Anglican church is home to a minister or priest of a different church who leads the occasional service. For example, there is a Lutheran street priest based out of the Anglican cathedral in Vancouver.
5. An Anglican and another church hold joint services every Sunday, led by a leader from both churches to a mixed congregation. However, the Roman Catholic Church still insists that the Catholic Mass is celebrated separately and there is no eucharistic sharing.

There is a diversity of models for joint worship.

== See also ==
- English Covenant
- Local ecumenical partnership

== Bibliography ==
- Protestant Episcopal Church in the Diocese of New Hampshire (1910). Journal of the Proceedings of the One Hundred and Ninth Annual Convention of the Protestant Episcopal Church in the Diocese of New Hampshire. Concord, New Hampshire: The Rumford Press.
- Redmile, Robert David (2006). The Apostolic Succession and the Catholic Episcopate in the Christian Episcopal Church of Canada. Xulon Press. ISBN 978-1-60034-517-3.
- Smith, Sydney Fenn (1912). "Union of Christendom". In Herbermann, Charles (ed.). Catholic Encyclopedia. Vol. 15. New York: Robert Appleton Company. pp. 132–154.
