= Lay presidency =

Lay presidency is a form of celebrating the Lord's Supper (sometimes called the Eucharist) whereby the person presiding over the sacrament is not an ordained minister of religion. Similarly, when the celebrant is a deacon rather than a presbyter, the term diaconal presidency is used.

== Use ==
Most independent Christian churches have a form of lay presidency as part of their communal worship. Mainstream denominations have been less inclined to allow lay people to preside over the sacrament, preferring to use ordained ministers or priests for this role.

== Denominations which use lay presidency ==
In the United Methodist Church lay presidency is the norm. While many are ordained as presbyters (Elders) most clergy in the UMC are commissioned or licensed local pastors. These laypersons while called clergy in the Book of Discipline are nonetheless not ordained. These lay persons are only allowed to celebrate the sacraments in their appointments.

== Theological considerations ==
One area of conflict for Evangelical Christians in mainline churches is that, while the sacrament is a symbolic preaching of the gospel, only authorized and ordained ministers may preside, whereas non-ordained people are not allowed to do this, despite being allowed to preach the gospel in some cases. This may be seen as elevating the importance of the sacrament over the preaching of the gospel - that the symbolic preaching is more important than the literal. Evangelical elements in some mainline churches, for example the Diocese of Sydney within the Anglican Church of Australia, are considering introducing lay presidency due to this.

== North American Lutheran view ==
The Evangelical Lutheran Church in America and Evangelical Lutheran Church in Canada authorise lay and diaconal presidency in certain extraordinary circumstances, within a finite time period and location, and only with the approval of the synodical bishop. In some cases, individuals who have received a pastoral call are authorized to celebrate the Lord's Supper prior to their eventual ordination, although this practice is not in accord with the denomination's own worship statement, The Use of the Means of Grace.

Lay presidency of any kind would seem to be in conflict with Called to Common Mission, the full communion agreement between the ELCA and the Episcopal Church, which prohibits the practice. Theological opinions around the appropriateness of lay presidency are not uncommon in the ELCA, which is a merger of traditions that include both quasi-sacramental and purely functional understandings of ordained ministry. While the ELCA adopted the historic episcopate as part of Called to Common Mission, Lutherans have historically not understood ordination as leaving an indelible character on the minister. Nevertheless, ordained pastors who leave the ministerial roster and are later reinstated are not re-ordained, which would seem to indicate an implicit acceptance of this sacramental character. Lay presidency would also seem to contradict Article 14 of the Augsburg Confession, which states that "no one should publicly teach in the Church or administer the Sacraments unless [he/she] be regularly called."
