= A Formula of Agreement =

Ecclesiastical agreement of full communion

A Formula of Agreement is an ecclesiastical agreement between Reformed churches (Presbyterian Church (U.S.A.), Reformed Church in America, and the United Church of Christ) and the Evangelical Lutheran Church in America, establishing full communion with each other.

== Background ==
Beginning in 1962, under the sponsorship of the Lutheran World Federation and the Reformed World Alliance, representatives from the Lutheran Church in America, the American Lutheran Church, the United Presbyterian Church in the U.S.A., the Presbyterian Church in the U.S., the Reformed Church in America, and the United Church of Christ met to discuss their differences and agreements regarding the doctrine of the Lord's Supper. In 1966, the book Marburg Revisited, the title referring to the Marburg Colloquy of 1529, was published, claiming that "As a result of our studies and discussions we see no insuperable obstacles to pulpit and altar fellowship and, therefore, we recommend to our parent bodies that they encourage their constituent churches to enter into discussions looking forward to intercommunion and the fuller recognition of one another's ministries." While a second round of dialogues between 1972 and 1974, made little progress, a third round (1981–1983) produced joint statements on the Lord's Supper, justification and ministry, published in A Call To Action in 1984. Two years later, representatives reached the conclusion that the Reformed and Lutheran denominations recognize each other as churches that preach the Gospel and administer the sacraments in accordance to Christ's command, recommendations which were adopted by the Presbyterian Church (U.S.A.) (which has come about due to a merger between the United Presbyterian Church in the U.S.A. and the Presbyterian Church in the U.S. in 1983) and the Reformed Church in America in 1986, and would be adopted by the United Church of Christ in 1989. For their parts, while the Association of Evangelical Lutheran Churches and the American Lutheran Church also adopted the resolutions in 1986, although the Lutheran Church in America was more reluctant to adopt the resolutions, recommending further dialogues.

In 1988, the Association of Evangelical Lutheran Churches, the American Lutheran Church and the Lutheran Church in America merged to form the Evangelical Lutheran Church in America and at their constituting meeting, it was voted to continue discussions with the PCUSA, RCA and United Church of Christ, forming the Lutheran-Reformed Committee for Theological Conversations in order to discuss doctrinal condemnations in the Lutheran "Formula of Concord" and issues relating to Christology, the Lord's Supper and predestination. The committee released their report "A Common Calling: The Witness of our Reformation Churches in North America Today" in 1992, which stated that there were no "church dividing differences" and unanimously recommended:

That the Evangelical Lutheran Church in America, the Presbyterian Church (U.S.A.), the Reformed Church in America (RCA), and the United Church of Christ (UCC) declare that they are in full communion with one another. In the specific terms of full communion as they are developed in our study, this recommendation also requires (1) that they recognize each other as churches in which the Gospel is rightly preached and the sacraments rightly administered according to the Word of God; (2) that they withdraw any historic condemnation by one side or the other as inappropriate for the faith and life of our churches today; (3) that they continue to recognize each others' Baptism and authorize and encourage the sharing of the Lord's Supper among their members; (4) that they recognize each others' various ministries and make provision for the orderly exchange of ordained ministers of Word and Sacrament; (5) that they establish appropriate channels of consultation and decision-making within the existing structures of the churches; (6) that they commit themselves to an ongoing process of theological dialogue in order to clarify further the common understanding of the faith and foster its common expression in evangelism, witness, and service; (7) that they pledge themselves to living together under the Gospel in such a way that the principle of mutual affirmation and admonition becomes the basis of a trusting relationship in which respect and love for the other will have a chance to grow.

These recommendations led to the production of several documents intended for study in the churches: A Common Discovery: Learning about the Churches of the Reformation in North America Today; Lutheran-Reformed Theological Reflections on Full Communion; and Glimpses: What Full Communion May Mean to You. Eventually, after some reluctance from those in the RCA about entering into full communion with the UCC due to issues regarding homosexuality, A Formula of Agreement was adopted by the denominations in 1997.

== Content ==
The formulas affirm that the denominations are in full communion with each other. Full communion is defined such that the denominations

- recognize each other as churches in which the gospel is rightly preached and the sacraments rightly administered according to the Word of God;
- withdraw any historic condemnation by one side or the other as inappropriate for the life and faith of our churches today;
- continue to recognize each other's Baptism and authorize and encourage the sharing of the Lord's Supper among their members;
- recognize each others' various ministries and make provision for the orderly exchange of ordained ministers of Word and Sacrament;
- establish appropriate channels of consultation and decision-making within the existing structures of the churches;
- commit themselves to an ongoing process of theological dialogue in order to clarify further the common understanding of the faith and foster its common expression in evangelism, witness, and service;
- pledge themselves to living together under the Gospel in such a way that the principle of mutual affirmation and admonition becomes the basis of a trusting relationship in which respect and love for the other will have a chance to grow.

Noting overall theological disagreements in the past in their confessional documents, the formulas state that "as a consequence of doctrinal agreement, it is stated that the 'condemnations expressed in the confessional documents no longer apply to the contemporary doctrinal position of the assenting churches'" (Leuenberg Agreement, IV.32.b).

Theologically, the biggest issue has been difference between the Lutherans and the Reformed stem from disagreements over the sacrament of the Lord's Supper, with the Lutherans arguing that Christ is physically present in the elements, whereas the Reformed have argued that Christ is spiritually present. The formulas note that "the theological conversations acknowledged that it has not been possible to reconcile the confessional formulations from the sixteenth century with a 'common language. . .which could do justice to all the insights, convictions, and concerns of our ancestors in the faith' (A Common Calling, p. 49). However, the theological conversations recognized these enduring differences as acceptable diversities with regard to the Lord's Supper." Citing the Leuenberg Agreement of 1973 between several Lutheran and Reformed churches in Europe, it notes that:

"Lutheran and Reformed Christians agree that: In the Lord's Supper the risen Christ imparts himself in body and blood, given up for all, through his word of promise with bread and wine. He thereby grants us forgiveness of sins and sets us free for a new life of faith. He enables us to experience anew that we are members of his body. He strengthens us for service to all people. (The official text reads, 'Er starkt uns zum Dienst an den Menschen,' which may be translated 'to all human beings') (Leuenberg Agreement, II.2.15).

When we celebrate the Lord's Supper we proclaim the death of Christ through which God has reconciled the world with himself. We proclaim the presence of the risen Lord in our midst. Rejoicing that the Lord has come to us, we await his future coming in glory (Leuenberg Agreement, II.2.16)"

In regards to historical disagreements over double vs. single predestination, the formulas state that Reformed and the Lutherans can agree that salvation by grace alone through faith alone and that "Although Lutherans and Reformed have different emphases in the way they live out their belief in the sovereignty of God's love, they agree that 'God's unconditional will to save must be preached against all cultural optimism or pessimism' (A Common Calling, p. 54). It is noted that "'a common language that transcends the polemics of the past and witnesses to the common predestination faith of Lutheran and Reformed Churches has emerged already in theological writings and official or unofficial statements in our churches' (A Common Calling, page 55)".

=== Exchange of ministers ===
The Formula of Agreement allows for "an orderly exchange of ministers of word and sacrament" between the PCUSA, ELCA, UCC or RCA. A minister wishing to transfer to another denomination must be educated in their own tradition before transferring to a church in another tradition and it must be done at the invitation of the receiving church and with the consent of the sending church Each denomination has established procedures for allowing ministers from other denominations to serve in their denomination, and the agreement guarantees that each denomination's polity will be respected.

== Controversy ==
The fellowship between the denominations has remained controversial. The Lutheran Church – Missouri Synod has condemned the agreement, arguing that it jettisons the Lutheran confessional standards as laid out in the Book of Concord, as the Lutheran and the Reformed views of the supper are irreconcilable.

One of the other larger issues has to do with diverging stances on human sexuality, as the Reformed Church in America officially does not affirm homosexuality. Even as the Formula of Agreement was being drafted, some in the Reformed Church in America objected to the agreement with the United Church of Christ because of their more progressive stance on homosexuality. The ELCA's subsequent decision in 2009 to allow homosexuals to serve as clergy prompted some conservatives in the RCA to call for the RCA's withdrawal from the Formula of Agreement. While the RCA would not sever the ties with the ELCA, the 2010 General Synod of the RCA expressed their concern by the move of the Lutherans, two denominations eventually agreed to further dialogue about the issue. In 2012, an RCA classis in Michigan unsuccessfully made an overture to the General Synod to have the RCA withdraw from the Formula of Agreement. 2013 saw the adoption of a paper by Formula Churches on Scripture and moral discernment, a paper in which the Disciples of Christ, the Moravian Church in North America and the Christian Reformed Church in North America took an advisory role in drafting.
