= Porvoo Communion =

Communion of European Anglican and Lutheran churches

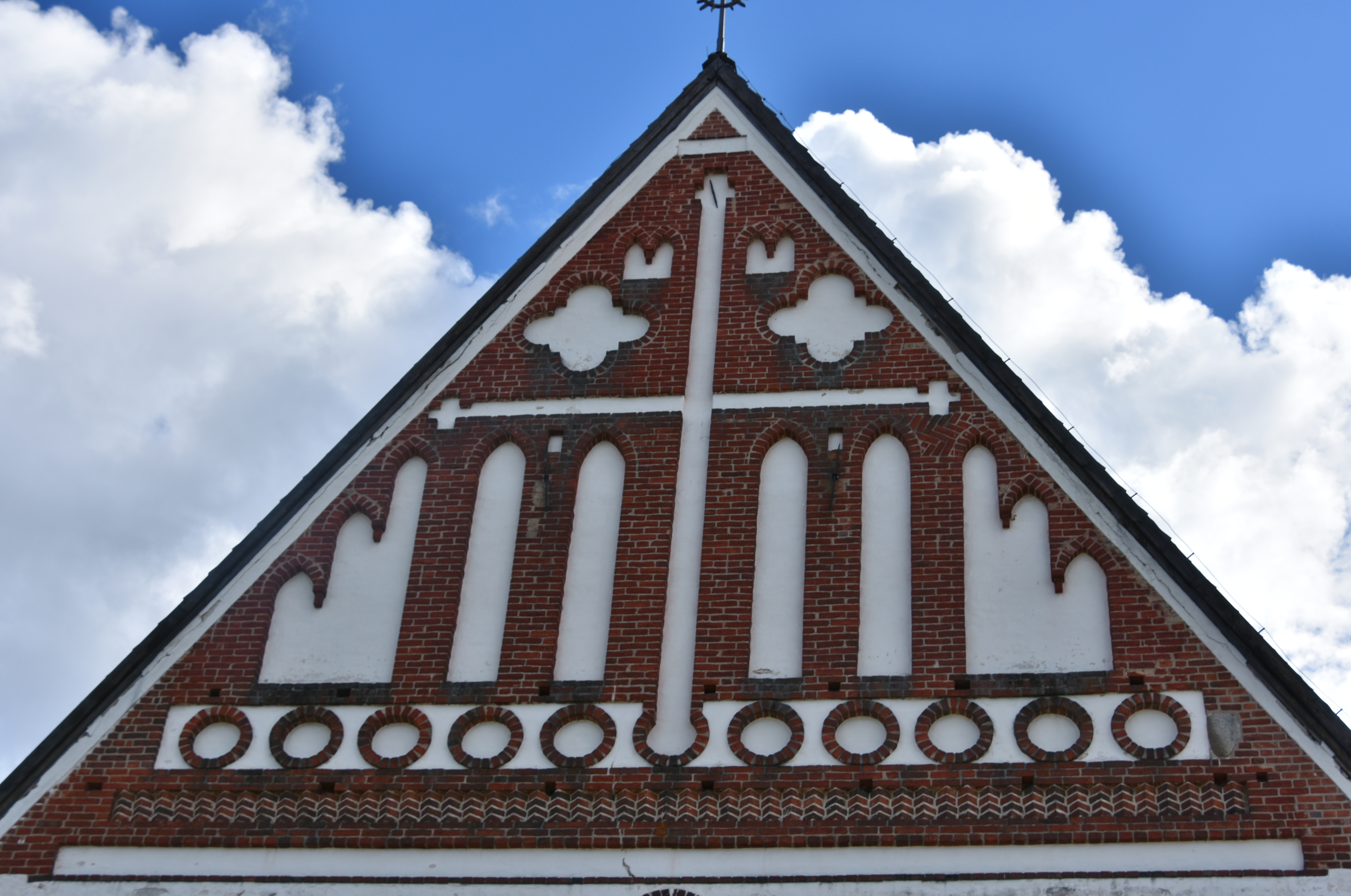
- The distinctive gable of Porvoo Cathedral used to symbolize the Porvoo Communion
- Type: Communion
- Classification: Protestant
- Orientation: Anglican; Lutheran
- Region: Europe
- Origin: 1992
- Members: 45,000,000
- Official website: https://porvoocommunion.org/

Countries with churches of the Porvoo Communion. The names of churches in the Anglican Communion are magenta coloured (or pink color), those established after the First Vatican Council of the Roman Catholic Church in 1868–1870 are in blue (or violet); the names of Nordic Lutheran churches (Scandinavia and Baltic area) are red.

The Porvoo Communion is a communion of 15 predominantly northern European Anglican and Evangelical Lutheran churches, with some church bodies in the Iberian Peninsula of the same denomination. It was established in 1992 by a theological agreement entitled the Porvoo Common Statement which establishes full communion between and among these churches. The agreement was negotiated in the town of Järvenpää in Finland, but the communion's name comes from the nearby city of Porvoo, where a joint Eucharist (or Holy Communion) was celebrated in Porvoo Cathedral after the formal signing in Järvenpää. The Porvoo Communion claims to represent 45 million members among the member churches, approximately 50% of Europe's Protestants.

== Overview ==
The first seeds to the broader communion formed in 1992 were planted in 1922 when the Anglican Church and the Church of Sweden agreed to enter communion with each other. In 1938, the Archbishop of Canterbury, symbolic head of the Anglican Communion, invited the representatives of the Estonian Evangelical Lutheran Church and Latvian Lutheran Church to Lambeth Palace in London in order to reach "altar and pulpit fellowship" between the Anglican and Baltic Lutheran churches. This process came to a formal conclusion with the establishment of the much wider Porvoo Communion in 1992. The churches involved are the several Anglican churches of the British Isles (headed by the founding Church of England) and the other Evangelical Lutheran churches of the Northern European countries. Later negotiations brought the small Anglican churches of Spain and Portugal into the agreement. These churches all share episcopal polity of church organization with the three-fold ministry of bishops, priests (or pastors) and deacons within the historical episcopate with apostolic succession (only bishops ordaining clergy or other bishops, priests and deacons). This is based on the threefold office of the early church.

The Porvoo Communion has no central office or overseer. Each member church has a contact person and these form a contact group which meets each year. Two bishops, one Lutheran and the other Anglican, are co-moderators of the contact group, and there are two co-secretaries also drawn from each tradition. Both are members of the Lutheran World Federation and the Anglican Communion. There are also various conferences and meetings organized to discuss issues of concern to the entire Communion.

== Participants ==
Signatories of the Porvoo Communion:

1994

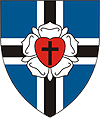
- Estonian Evangelical Lutheran Church
- Evangelical Lutheran Church in Lithuania
- Church of Norway
- Scottish Episcopal Church
- Church of Sweden

1995

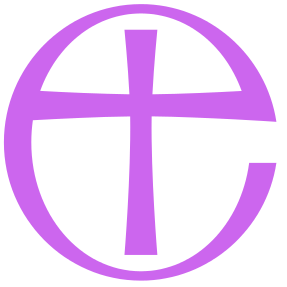
- Church of England
- Evangelical Lutheran Church of Finland
- Church of Ireland
- Church of Iceland
- Church in Wales

2001

- Lusitanian Catholic Apostolic Evangelical Church
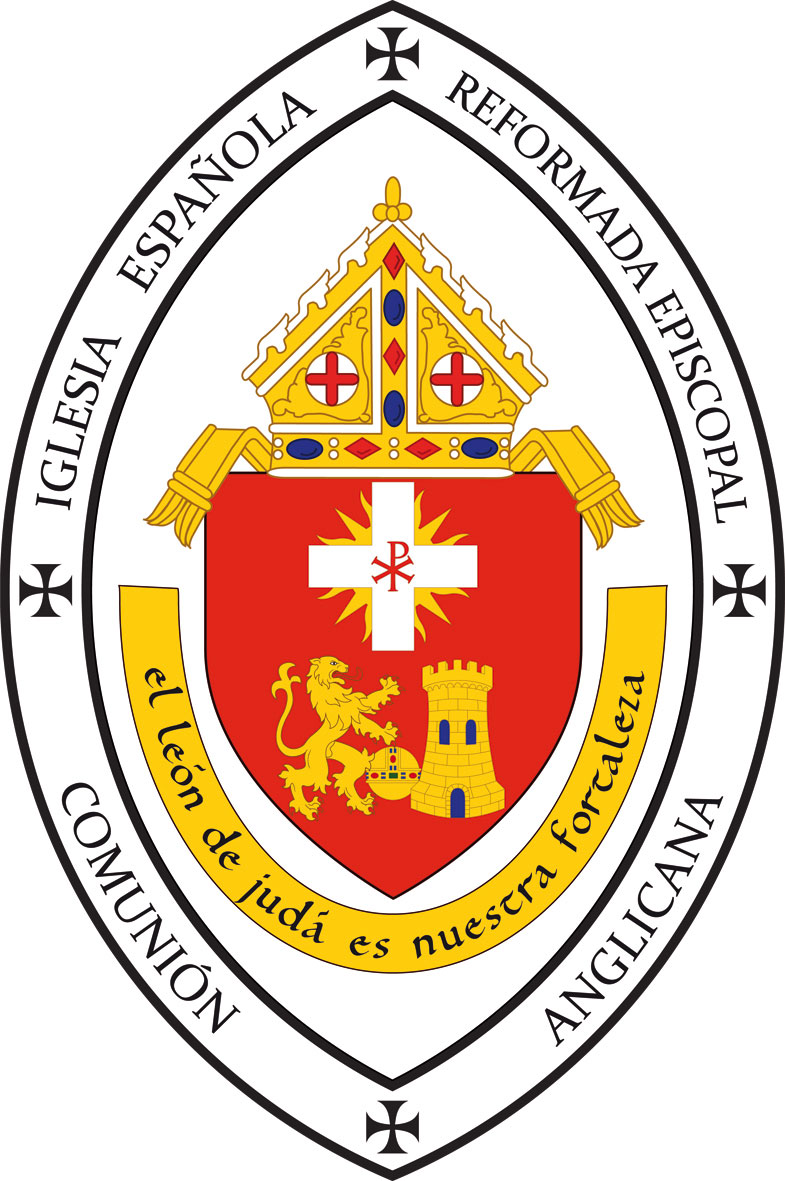
- Spanish Reformed Episcopal Church

2010

- Church of Denmark

2014

- Latvian Evangelical Lutheran Church Worldwide
- Lutheran Church in Great Britain

2025

- Church of the Faroe Islands

Observers:

- Evangelical Lutheran Church of Latvia, since 1994

== See also ==
- Bonn Agreement (Christianity)
- Churches Beyond Borders
  - Called to Common Mission
  - Convocation of Episcopal Churches in Europe
  - Waterloo Declaration
- Communion of Protestant Churches in Europe
- Ecumenical Movement
- List of the largest Protestant denominations
- Other Nordic Lutheran churches
  - Evangelical Lutheran Church of Ingria
  - Communion of Nordic Lutheran Dioceses
