= Waterloo Declaration =

The Waterloo Declaration or Called to Full Communion is an accord reached in 2001 by the Anglican Church of Canada and the Evangelical Lutheran Church in Canada. It was reached in 2001 at the Anglican Church's General Synod which was held at the University of Waterloo. In 2023, the Moravian Church in North America ratified the declaration as well, entering in full communion with the other two denominations.

== See also ==
- Anglican Communion and ecumenism
- Called to Common Mission
- Churches Beyond Borders
- Porvoo Communion
