= Full communion =

Reciprocity among Christian individuals or churches

Full communion is a communion or relationship of full agreement among different Christian denominations or Christian individuals that share certain essential principles of Christian theology. Views vary among denominations on exactly what constitutes full communion, but typically when two or more denominations are in full communion it enables services and celebrations, such as the Eucharist, to be shared among congregants or clergy of any of them with the full approval of each.

== Definition and terminology ==
Full communion is an ecclesiological term for an established relationship between Christian denominations that may be constituted by shared eucharist, doctrine, and ecclesiology. Different denominations emphasize different aspects or define the term differently.

Several Protestant denominations base their idea of full communion on the Augsburg Confession which says that "the true unity of the church" is present where "the gospel is rightly preached and sacraments rightly administered." They believe that full communion between two denominations is not a merger, but rather is when two denominations develop a relationship based on a mutual understanding, respect and recognition of baptism and sharing of the Lord's Supper. They may worship together, exchange clergy, and share commitments to evangelism and service. For example, groups recognized as being in full communion with the Evangelical Lutheran Church, on this basis, include the Presbyterian Church (USA), Reformed Church in America, United Church of Christ, the Episcopal Church (United States), the Moravian Church, and the United Methodist Church. These churches are not necessarily in full communion with each other, however; each denomination is free to develop its own relationships with other churches. For example, The Episcopal Church, in addition to being a member of the Anglican Communion, is in full communion with the Evangelical Lutheran Church in America, Moravian Church (Northern and Southern Provinces), Mar Thoma Syrian Church of India, Old Catholic Churches of the Union of Utrecht, Philippine Independent Church, and the Church of Sweden. They are not, currently, in full communion with the Presbyterian Church (USA), Reformed Church in America, or the United Church of Christ, though they are currently in dialogue with other churches; including the United Methodist Church, Presbyterian Church (USA), and Roman Catholic Church.

== By Christian denomination ==
=== Catholic Church ===
==== Full versus partial communion ====
The Catholic Church makes a distinction between full and partial communion: where full communion exists, there is but the one Church; partial communion, on the other hand, exists where some elements of Christian faith are held in common, but complete unity on essentials is lacking. Accordingly, they see the church as in partial communion with Protestants and in much closer, but still incomplete, communion with Orthodox churches. It has expressed this distinction in documents such as Unitatis redintegratio, the Second Vatican Council's decree on ecumenism, which states: "quite large communities came to be separated from full communion with the Catholic Church. [...] Men who believe in Christ and have been truly baptized are in communion with the Catholic Church even though this communion is imperfect".

Nonetheless, the Second Vatican Council used the word "communion" in a sense other than communio in sacris when speaking of Christians separated from the Catholic Church. The Catechism of the Catholic Church, citing the Second Vatican Council and Pope Paul VI, states:

"The Church knows that she is joined in many ways to the baptized who are honoured by the name of Christian, but do not profess the Catholic faith in its entirety or have not preserved unity or communion under the successor of Peter" (Lumen gentium 15). Those "who believe in Christ and have been properly baptized are put in a certain, although imperfect, communion with the Catholic Church" (Unitatis redintegratio 3). With the Orthodox Churches, this communion is so profound that it lacks little to attain the fullness that would permit a common celebration of the Lord's Eucharist

Full communion thus involves completeness of "those bonds of communion – faith, sacraments and pastoral governance – that permit the Faithful to receive the life of grace within the Church."

==== Universal and particular churches ====
In Catholicism, the "universal Church" means Catholicism itself, from the Greek adjective καθολικός (katholikos), meaning "universal". The term particular church denotes an ecclesiastical community headed by a bishop or equivalent, and this can include both local dioceses as well as autonomous (or sui juris) particular churches, which include other rites such as the Latin Church and the Eastern Catholic Churches.

A 1992 Congregation for the Doctrine of the Faith (CDF) letter to Catholic bishops expressed this idea as: "'the universal Church cannot be conceived as the sum of the particular Churches, or as a federation of particular Churches'. It is not the result of the communion of the Churches, but, in its essential mystery, it is a reality ontologically and temporally prior to every individual particular Church".

==== List of Catholic churches in full communion ====
The autonomous Catholic churches in full communion with the Holy See are:

- Of Alexandrian liturgical tradition:
  - Coptic Catholic Church
  - Eritrean Catholic Church
  - Ethiopian Catholic Church
- Of Syro-Antiochian or West Syriac liturgical tradition:
  - Maronite Church
  - Syriac Catholic Church
  - Syro-Malankara Catholic Church
- Of Armenian liturgical tradition:
  - Armenian Catholic Church
- Of Byzantine (Constantinopolitan) liturgical tradition:
  - Albanian Greek Catholic Church
  - Belarusian Greek Catholic Church
  - Bulgarian Greek Catholic Church
  - Greek Byzantine Catholic Church
  - Greek Catholic Church of Croatia and Serbia
  - Hungarian Greek Catholic Church
  - Italo-Albanian Catholic Church
  - Macedonian Greek Catholic Church
  - Melkite Greek Catholic Church
  - Romanian Greek Catholic Church
  - Russian Greek Catholic Church
  - Ruthenian Greek Catholic Church
  - Slovak Greek Catholic Church
  - Ukrainian Greek Catholic Church
- Of Chaldean or East Syriac tradition:
  - Chaldean Catholic Church
  - Syro-Malabar Church
- Of Western liturgical tradition:
  - Latin Church (Note: Of the various Latin liturgical rites used within the Latin particular Church, even those associated not with a religious order but with a geographical area do not constitute separate particular Churches. Thus there is no Ambrosian particular Church corresponding to the Ambrosian Rite in use in Milan and neighbouring areas of Italy and Switzerland, nor is there a Mozarabic particular Church in those parts of Spain where the Mozarabic Rite is practiced. In the Latin Church, governance is uniform, even where liturgical rite is not.)

==== Sharing in the Eucharist ====
As a practical matter for most Catholics, full communion means that a member of one church may partake of the Eucharist celebrated in another, and for priests, that they are accepted as celebrants of the Eucharist in the other church.

Restrictions in this matter were already in force in the second century as witnessed to by Justin Martyr in his First Apology: "No one is allowed to partake (of the Eucharist) but the man who believes that the things which we teach are true, and who has been washed with the washing that is for the remission of sins, and unto regeneration, and who is so living as Christ has enjoined."

For acceptance into full communion with the Catholic Church a specific profession of the faith of the Catholic Church is required even of those who have been members of a separate church whose sacraments the Catholic Church considers to be valid. Being "in full communion with the Catholic Church" requires that they "firmly accept" its teaching on faith and morals.

Intercommunion usually means an agreement between churches by which all members of each church (clergy with clergy, or laity with laity, respectively) may participate in the other's Eucharistic celebrations or may hold joint celebrations. The Catholic Church has entered into no such agreement: it allows no Eucharistic concelebration by its clergy with clergy of churches not in full communion with it. (Note: "Catholic priests are forbidden to concelebrate the Eucharist with priests or ministers of churches or ecclesial communities which do not have full communion with the Catholic Church)

The Directory for the Application of Principles and Norms on Ecumenism indicates the limited circumstances in which Catholics may receive the Eucharist from clergy of churches not in full communion (never if those churches are judged not to have valid apostolic succession and thus valid Eucharist), and in which Catholic clergy may administer the sacraments to members of other churches.

The norms there indicated for the giving of the Eucharist to other Christians (communicatio in sacris) are summarized in canon 844 of the Latin Church's 1983 Code of Canon Law. The Code of Canons of the Eastern Churches (CCEO) indicates that the norms of the Directory apply also to the clergy and laity of the Eastern Catholic Churches.

=== Eastern Orthodox ===
Eastern Orthodox have an understanding of what full communion means that is very similar to that of the Catholic Church. Though they have no figure corresponding to that of the Roman Catholic Pope, performing a function like that of the Pope's Petrine Office for the whole of their respective communions, they see each of their autocephalous churches as embodiments of, respectively, the One, Holy, Catholic and Apostolic Church. They too consider full communion an essential condition for common sharing in the Eucharist.

For the autocephalous churches that form the Eastern Orthodox Church, see Eastern Orthodox Church organization. Their number is somewhat in dispute.

=== Church of the East ===
The Church of the East is currently divided into churches that are not in full communion with one another. The Assyrian Church of the East and the Ancient Church of the East divided in the 20th century over the former's limitation of the post of patriarch to members of a single family and due to the adoption of the New Calendar by the former. There is movement towards reunity, but they are not in full communion with one another at present. The Chaldean Catholic Church shares a similar history with both, but is currently in full communion with neither. The Catholic Church, of which the Chaldean Church is part, allows its ministers to give the Eucharist to members of Eastern churches who seek it on their own accord and are properly disposed, and it allows its faithful who cannot approach a Catholic minister to receive the Eucharist, when necessary or spiritually advantageous, from ministers of non-Catholic churches that have a recognised Eucharist.

The Guidelines for Admission to the Eucharist between the Chaldean Church and the Assyrian Church of the East explicitly apply these rules, which hold also for the Ancient Church of the East and all Eastern Orthodox churches, to the Assyrian Church of the East. "When necessity requires, Assyrian faithful are permitted to participate and to receive Holy Communion in a Chaldean celebration of the Holy Eucharist; in the same way, Chaldean faithful for whom it is physically or morally impossible to approach a Catholic minister, are permitted to participate and to receive Holy Communion in an Assyrian celebration of the Holy Eucharist".

=== Oriental Orthodox churches ===
The Oriental Orthodox Churches have a similar understanding of communion as the Eastern Orthodox Church and Roman Catholic Church. There is no leader of all the Oriental Orthodox Churches. All churches within the Oriental Orthodox Churches are autocephalous and operate and function on their own. All Oriental Orthodox Churches are in full communion with each other. They can take part in all the 7 sacraments from each other's churches.

The Oriental Orthodox churches are:

- Coptic Orthodox Church of Alexandria
- Syriac Orthodox Church of Antioch
- Malankara Orthodox Syrian Church
- Armenian Apostolic Church
- Eritrean Orthodox Tewahedo Church
- Ethiopian Orthodox Tewahedo Church

The Oriental Orthodox Churches have a relationship with the Roman Catholic Church, and is working on a relationship with the Eastern Orthodox Church and other Christian churches.

The Oriental Orthodox Churches believe in apostolic succession, the concept that Jesus Christ gave spiritual authority to the 12 Apostles and 72 Disciples, and that authority has been passed on till this day.

For example, the Syriac Orthodox Patriarch of Antioch is considered the successor of St. Peter, the Coptic Orthodox Pope of Alexandria is considered the successor of St. Mark, the Armenian Apostolic Catholicos of Armenia is considered the successor of St. Bartholomew and St. Thaddeus, the Catholicos of the East of India is considered the successor of St. Thomas.

Likewise, the Oriental Orthodox Churches acknowledges the Greek Orthodox Patriarch of Constantinople as the successor of St. Andrew and the Roman Catholic Pope as the successor of St. Peter and St. Paul. Due to the schisms at the Council of Chalcedon, the tensions between the churches have been high, but in recent years the leaders of all churches have acknowledged each other, and are working on a relationship with each other.

=== Anglican Communion ===
The Anglican Communion distinguishes between full communion and intercommunion. It applies the first term to situations "where between two Churches, not of the same denominational or confessional family, there is unrestricted communio in sacris including mutual recognition and acceptance of ministries", and the second term to situations "where varying degrees of relation other than full communion are established by agreement between two such Churches". This distinction differs from the distinction that the Catholic Church makes between full and partial communion in that the Anglican concept of intercommunion implies a formal agreement entered into by the churches concerned. As with other Protestant traditions, the Anglican understanding of full communion differs from that of the Roman Catholic Church and Eastern Orthodoxy, which consider that full communion between churches involves them becoming a single church, as in the case of the particular churches "in which and formed out of which the one and unique Catholic Church exists".

All the churches of the Anglican Communion are in full communion with the Mar Thoma Syrian Church, which is an Oriental Protestant denomination based in India. In addition the Anglican Communion recognizes the possibility of full communion between some of its member provinces or churches and other churches, without having the entire Anglican Communion share that relationship. An example is the Porvoo Communion, which is largely composed of Evangelical Lutheran churches.

The Anglican Communion established full communion with the Utrechter Old Catholic Churches on the basis of the 1931 Bonn Agreement, which established three principles:

1. Each communion recognizes the catholicity and independence of the other and maintains its own.
2. Each communion agrees to admit members of the other communion to participate in the sacraments.
3. Full communion does not require from either communion the acceptance of all doctrinal opinion, sacramental devotion or liturgical practice characteristic of the other, but implies that each believes the other to hold all the essentials of the Christian faith.

The Anglicans Online website provides a list of non-Anglican churches "in full communion with the See of Canterbury" and also indicates some important ecumenical agreements of local character (i.e., not involving the whole of the Anglican Communion) with other non-Anglican churches. It also lists churches that, in spite of bearing names (such as "Anglican" or "Episcopal") that might suggest a relationship with the Anglican Communion, are not in communion with it.

=== Methodist churches ===
The United Methodist Church is in full communion with the Evangelical Lutheran Church in America; the Moravian Church in North America (Northern and Southern Provinces); pan-Methodist Churches which include the African Methodist Episcopal Church, African Methodist Episcopal Zion Church, African Union Methodist Protestant Church, Christian Methodist Episcopal Church, Union American Methodist Episcopal Church; and the Uniting Church in Sweden. The United Methodist Church also has a large number of churches in partnerships in "formal, ecumenical relationships approved by the General Conference" which are categorized as concordat churches, affiliated autonomous churches, affiliated united churches, and known ecumenical partner churches Specific to European Central Conferences. While not using the exact wording, these relationships are closely akin to full communion, and include the Methodist Church of Great Britain and the United Church of Canada.

The United Methodist Church approved full communion with the Episcopal Church at their Annual Conference on April 30, 2024. The agreement is awaiting approval by the Episcopal Church, which is not expected until 2027. Both churches are already in full communion with the Evangelical Lutheran Church in America and the Moravian Church in North America (Northern and Southern Provinces).

=== Reformed churches ===
The United Church of Christ (UCC) defines full communion as meaning that "divided churches recognize each others' sacraments and provide for the orderly transfer of ministers from one denomination to another." Some of these go back to the 17th century Pilgrims in Holland; other relationships are recent. The UCC is in full communion alliance with the members of the World Communion of Reformed Churches, the Union of Evangelical Churches in Germany, the Presbyterian Church in the US, and several others in North America and elsewhere.

=== Other churches ===
Churches or denominations holding to open communion allow all persons who consider themselves "Christian believers" to participate, even without any arrangement of full communion with the other church or denomination involved, and still less requiring an arrangement involving interchangeability of ordained ministers.

It is in the stronger sense of becoming a single church that in 2007 the Traditional Anglican Communion sought "full communion" with the Roman Catholic Church as a sui iuris (particular church) jurisdiction, but in 2012 declined the possibility offered by Pope Benedict XVI to join a personal ordinariate for former Anglicans in full communion with the see of Rome.

== Agreements between churches ==
Full communion agreements between Mainline Protestant churches in North America
	ELCA	TEC	UMC	PCUSA	RCA	MCNA	CC (DOC)	UCC (U.S.)	UCC (Canada)	ELCIC	ACC
ELCA		1999	2009	1997	1997	1999		1997		2018, LWF	2018
TEC	1999		Pending			2010				2018	2018, AC
UMC	2009	Pending				2018			WMC		
PCUSA	1997				1997, WCRC	2016		1997, WCRC			
RCA	1997			1997, WCRC				1997, WCRC			
MCNA	1999	2010	2018	2016						2023	2023
CC (DOC)								1989	2019		
UCC (U.S.)	1997			1997, WCRC	1997, WCRC		1989		2015, WCRC		
UCC (Canada)			WMC				2019	2015, WCRC			
ELCIC	2018, LWF	2018				2023					2001
ACC	2018	2018, AC				2023				2001	

The following groupings of churches have arrangements for or are working on arrangements for:

- mutual recognition of members
- joint celebration of the Lord's Supper/Holy Communion/Eucharist (these churches practice open communion)
- mutual recognition of ordained ministers
- mutual recognition of sacraments
- a common commitment to mission.

Agreements completed

1. The Anglican Communion, the Union of Utrecht of the Old Catholic Churches, the Mar Thoma Syrian Church of India, and the Philippine Independent Church
2. The Churches of the Porvoo Communion.
3. The Anglican Church of Canada, the Evangelical Lutheran Church in Canada, the Episcopal Church in the United States of America, and the Evangelical Lutheran Church in America.
4. The Evangelical Lutheran Church in America and each of the following: the member churches of the Lutheran World Federation, the Episcopal Church in the United States of America, the Presbyterian Church (USA), the Reformed Church in America, the United Church of Christ, the United Methodist Church and the Moravian Church in America.
5. The Leuenberg Agreement, concluded in 1973 and adopted by 105 European Protestant churches, since renamed the Community of Protestant Churches in Europe.
6. The Moravian Church and each of the following: the Evangelical Lutheran Church in America and the Episcopal Church in the United States of America.
7. The United Methodist Church with the African Methodist Episcopal Church, the African Methodist Episcopal Zion Church, the African Union Methodist Protestant Church, the Christian Methodist Episcopal Church, the Evangelical Lutheran Church in America, the Union American Methodist Episcopal Church, and the Northern and Southern Provinces of the Moravian Church.
8. The United Church of Christ and each of the following: the Christian Church (Disciples of Christ), the Evangelical Lutheran Church in America, Presbyterian Church (USA), and the Reformed Church in America.
9. The Presbyterian Church (USA) with Evangelical Lutheran Church in America and United Church of Christ.
10. the Episcopal Church in the United States of America with Anglican Church of Canada, the Evangelical Lutheran Church in Canada, Evangelical Lutheran Church in America, and Moravian Church.
11. The United Episcopal Church of North America and each of the following: the Anglican Catholic Church, the Anglican Province of Christ the King, and the Diocese of the Great Lakes.
12. The Anglican Province of America has intercommunion with the Reformed Episcopal Church and the Church of Nigeria.
13. The Church of Ireland and the Methodist Church in Ireland have established full communion and are working toward interchangeability of ministry.
14. The Union of Utrecht of the Old Catholic Churches and the Church of Sweden are in full communion since the joint signature of the Uppsala Agreement in 2016.
15. The Union of Scranton between the Polish National Catholic Church and the Nordic Catholic Church.
16. The Churches of the Communion of Nordic Lutheran Dioceses
17. The Churches of the Hungarian Reformed Communion

Agreements in progress

1. The United Methodist Council of Bishops have approved interim agreements for sharing the Eucharist with the Episcopal Church in the United States of America.
2. The Methodist Church of Great Britain is currently working toward full communion with the Church of England and the United Reformed Church.

== See also ==
- Closed communion
- Ecclesiastical separatism
- Ecumenism
- Eucharist
- Koinonia
- Open communion
- Personal ordinariate

== Sources ==
- Code of Canon Law. Prepared under the auspices of the Canon Law Society of America (from 2001 Latin-English print ed.). Vatican City: Libreria Editrice Vaticana. 4 November 2003 – via vatican.va.
- Code of Canons of the Eastern Churches. Prepared under the auspices of the Canon Law Society of America (from 1992 Latin-English print ed.). Rome, IT: Èulogos SpA. 17 July 2007 – via intratext.com.
