= Evangelical Lutheran Church in Canada =

Protestant denomination in Canada

- Église évangélique luthérienne au Canada
- Abbreviation: ELCIC
- Classification: Protestant
- Orientation: Mainline Lutheran
- Theology: Moderate to Liberal
- Polity: Modified episcopal polity
- National Bishop: Larry Kochendorfer
- Full communion: ACC (since 2001); TEC (since 2018); ELCA (since 2018); Moravians (since 2023)
- Headquarters: Winnipeg, Manitoba
- Origin: 1986; 40 years ago Winnipeg, Manitoba
- Merger of: Evangelical Lutheran Church of Canada; Lutheran Church in America, Canada Section
- Congregations: 519
- Members: 80,006
- Official website: www.elcic.ca

The Evangelical Lutheran Church in Canada (ELCIC; French: Église évangélique luthérienne au Canada) is Canada's largest Lutheran denomination, with 80,000 baptized.

Together with Lutheran Church–Canada and the Canadian Association of Lutheran Congregations, it is one of only three all-Canadian Lutheran denominations. The ELCIC is a member of the Lutheran World Federation, the Canadian Council of Churches, the World Council of Churches, and the Anglican-Lutheran North American grouping Churches Beyond Borders. The ELCIC represents a significant amount of the 328,045 Lutheran adherents identified in the 2021 Canadian Census.

== History ==
The Evangelical Lutheran Church in Canada came into being in 1986 through the merger of two predecessor bodies the Evangelical Lutheran Church of Canada (started in 1966 by Canadian congregations of the American Lutheran Church) and three synods of the Lutheran Church in America, called the Canada Section. (In 1988 these two U.S. church bodies ceased to exist as they merged into the Evangelical Lutheran Church in America, the ELCIC's sister denomination in the United States.)

=== Constituting Convention ===
- 1985 Winnipeg, Manitoba

=== National Conventions ===
- 1987 Ottawa, Ontario
- 1989 Saskatoon, Saskatchewan
- 1991 Edmonton, Alberta
- 1993 Vancouver, British Columbia
- 1995 Winnipeg, Manitoba
- 1997 Toronto, Ontario
- 1999 Regina, Saskatchewan
- 2001 Waterloo, Ontario
- 2003 Camrose, Alberta
- 2005 Winnipeg, Manitoba
- 2007 Winnipeg, Manitoba
- 2009 Vancouver, British Columbia
- 2011 Saskatoon, Saskatchewan
- 2013 Ottawa, Ontario
- 2015 Edmonton, Alberta
- 2017 Winnipeg, Manitoba
- 2019 Regina, Saskatchewan
- 2022 online convention
- 2023 Calgary, Alberta (Special Convention)
- 2025 Winnipeg, Manitoba

== Organisation ==
The Evangelical Lutheran Church in Canada is composed of five geography-based synods (similar to a diocese in Anglican polity). The presiding officer and chief pastor of each synod is a bishop.

- The British Columbia Synod
- The Synod of Alberta and the Territories
  - Robert Jacobson – first bishop (1985–1995)
- The Saskatchewan Synod
- The Manitoba/Northwestern Ontario Synod
- The Eastern Synod

This structure is identical to the synod structure of the ELCA, except that the Canadian synods cover one or more entire provinces, whereas some ELCA synods cover the whole or part of a metro area and some cover several states. Like the ELCA a presiding bishop serves as its head, but in the ELCIC, this bishop is known as the "National Bishop". Although episcopal in structure, the church does not have cathedrals as such, though the largest parish church in a city may well have that de facto function with respect to major worship services involving the whole Lutheran community.

== National Bishops ==
- The Rev. Donald Sjoberg, 1986–1993
- The Rev. Telmor Sartison, 1993–2001
- The Rev. Raymond Schultz, 2001–2007
- The Rev. Canon Susan Johnson, 2007-2025
- The Rev. Larry Kochendorfer, 2025-present

== Beliefs ==
The Church derives its teachings from the Bible and the Book of Concord which includes the three ecumenical creeds of the Christian Church—that is, the Apostles' Creed, the Nicene Creed and the Athanasian Creed. The Evangelical Lutheran Church in Canada is in full communion with the Anglican Church of Canada (under the Waterloo Declaration) and the Northern Province of the Moravian Church in North America. Martin Luther University College and Lutheran Theological Seminary, Saskatoon are the seminaries owned by the church.

=== Marriage ===
In 1974, progressive churches founded the Lutherans Concerned for Gay People network (renamed ReconcilingWorks in 2012) for the inclusion of LGBTQ people.

In 2006, the Eastern Synod voted to allow individual pastors and congregations to conduct blessing of same-sex unions, prompting a dispute between the synod and the national church over which body has the authority to make such a decision. The national church had previously voted against blessings, and the ELCIC's full communion partner, the Anglican Church of Canada, had voted to defer a decision. On June 23, 2007, at its National Convention, the ELCIC voted, by a 200–181 vote margin, against authorizing the Synods to devise individual mission strategies in regard to ministering to people who live in committed same-sex relationships, including the possibility of blessing such unions. The Eastern Synod Council, while affirming its jurisdiction in the matter, agreed to hold its decision in abeyance pending a decision by the national church.

In July 2011, the National Convention of the ELCIC adopted a new social statement on human sexuality and approved a motion allowing pastors whose conscience permits, in consultation with their congregations, to preside at marriages for same-gender couples. Some have claimed that the adoption of "ELCIC Social Statement on Human Sexuality" openly violates Article 2 of the ELCIC constitution, and have challenged the adoption as a violation of the ELCIC's constitution. A challenge was placed before the ELCIC's Court of Adjudication. The Court found that the complainant did not have the status required by the Constitution to press the complaint and declined to hear the complaint. As a result of the 2011 vote and the court's decision, the ELCIC today permits the blessings of same-sex marriage.

In 2025, ReconcilingWorks has 1,198 churches, 2 universities and 5 seminaries in the United States and Canada that support blessings of same-sex marriage.
