= Churches Beyond Borders =

Ecumenical partnership of Anglicans and Lutherans in North America

Churches Beyond Borders is an ecumenical grouping of Anglicans and Lutherans in North America. It includes The Episcopal Church (domestic dioceses and provinces), the Anglican Church of Canada, the Evangelical Lutheran Church in America (outside of the Bahamas), and the Evangelical Lutheran Church in Canada. Through the heads of communion in each member church, the group issues regular statements on the Doctrine of Discovery, climate change, racial reconciliation, gender justice, and other matters. Building on the previous 2001 Canadian Waterloo Declaration and the 1999-2000 American document Called to Common Mission, it was inaugurated in 2018 as an expression of full communion among Anglicans and Lutherans in North America.

== See also ==
- Anglican Communion and ecumenism
- Porvoo Communion
