= Called to Common Mission =

Document establishing full communion between the ELCA and Episcopal Church

Called to Common Mission (CCM) is an agreement between The Episcopal Church (TEC) and the Evangelical Lutheran Church in America (ELCA) in the United States, establishing full communion between them. It was ratified by the ELCA in 1999, the ECUSA in 2000, after the narrow failure of a previous agreement. Its principal author on the Episcopal side was theological professor J. Robert Wright. Under the agreement, they recognize the validity of each other's baptisms and ordinations. The agreement provided that the ELCA would accept the historical episcopate and the "threefold ministry" of bishop - priest (or pastor) - deacon with respect to ministers of communicant churches serving ELCA congregations; the installation of the ELCA presiding bishop was performed through the laying on of hands by Lutheran bishops in the historic episcopate. This provision was opposed by some in the ELCA, which after its founding merger in 1988, held a lengthy study of the ministry which was undertaken with divided opinions. In response to concerns about the meaning of the CCM, synod bishops in the ELCA drafted the Tucson resolution which presented the official ELCA position. It made clear that there is no requirement to ordain deacons or accept their ministry. It also provided assurance that the ELCA did not and was not required by CCM to change its own theological stance.

Lutheran churches of Scandinavian origin, such as the Church of Sweden and Church in Kenya, affirm apostolic succession and are in the historical episcopate; nevertheless, some within the ELCA argued that the historical episcopate would contradict the doctrine that the church exists wherever the Word of God is preached and sacraments are practiced. The traditional ELCA doctrine is affirmed by the Tucson resolution. Others objected on the grounds that adopting the Episcopalian / Anglican view on priestly orders and hierarchical structure was contrary to the Evangelical Lutheran concept of the "priesthood of all believers", which holds that all Christians stand on equal footing before God. They argued that the Old Covenant required a priest to mediate between God and humanity, but that New Covenant explicitly abolishes the need for priestly role by making every Christian a priest with direct access to God's grace. The Tucson resolution explained that the ELCA had not adopted the Episcopal view, but ECUSA or Reformed ordinands accepted by ELCA congregations would follow ELCA practice. Still others objected because of the implied directive that the use of a lay presidency would be abolished. This was a particular issue for rural congregations that periodically "called" a congregation member to conduct communion services consecrating the elements (of bread and wine for service) in the interim period or with the absence of ordained clergy (pastor). The Tucson resolution explicitly affirmed the continued use of lay ministry.

== See also ==
- Churches Beyond Borders
- Lutheran Congregations in Mission for Christ
- Porvoo Communion
- Waterloo Declaration
