= Moravian Church in North America =

Christian denomination

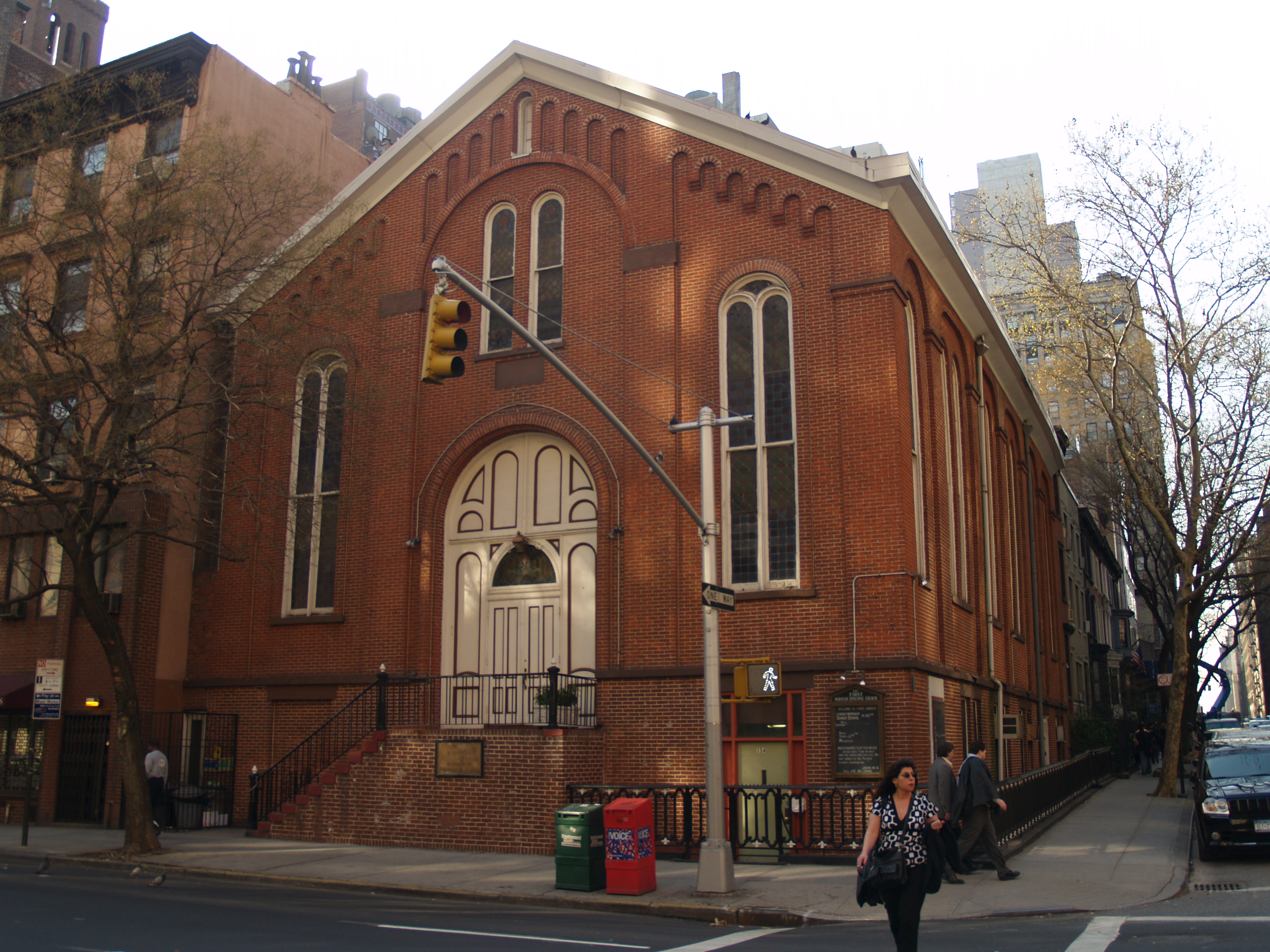
- First Moravian Church, New York City.
- Classification: Proto-Protestant
- Scripture: Holy Bible
- Theology: Hussite (Bohemian) with Pietist Lutheran influences
- Polity: Modified Episcopal
- Full communion: ELCA (since 1999); TEC (since 2010); PCUSA (since 2016); UMC (since 2018); ACC (since 2023); ELCC (since 2023)
- Associations: CCT, CMEP, NCC, WCC
- Territory: Canada, United States
- Origin: c. 1740

The Moravian Church in North America is part of the worldwide Moravian Church Unity. It dates from the arrival of the first Moravian missionaries to the United States in 1735, from their Herrnhut settlement in present-day Saxony, Germany. They came to minister to the scattered German immigrants, to the Native Americans and to enslaved Africans. They founded communities to serve as home bases for these missions. The missionary "messengers" were financially supported by the work of the "laborers" in these settlements. Currently, there are more than 60,000 members.

== History ==
The first Moravians to come to North America were August Gottlieb Spangenberg and Wenzel Neisser, who accompanied a group of persecuted Schwenkfelders to Pennsylvania in 1735 at Zinzendorf's direction. The first, and unsuccessful, attempt to found a Moravian community in North America was in Savannah, Georgia, which also began in 1735; it collapsed because of internal discord, and government pressure for Moravians to serve in the militia in defense against Spanish raids from Florida (1740, the so-called "War of Jenkins' Ear").

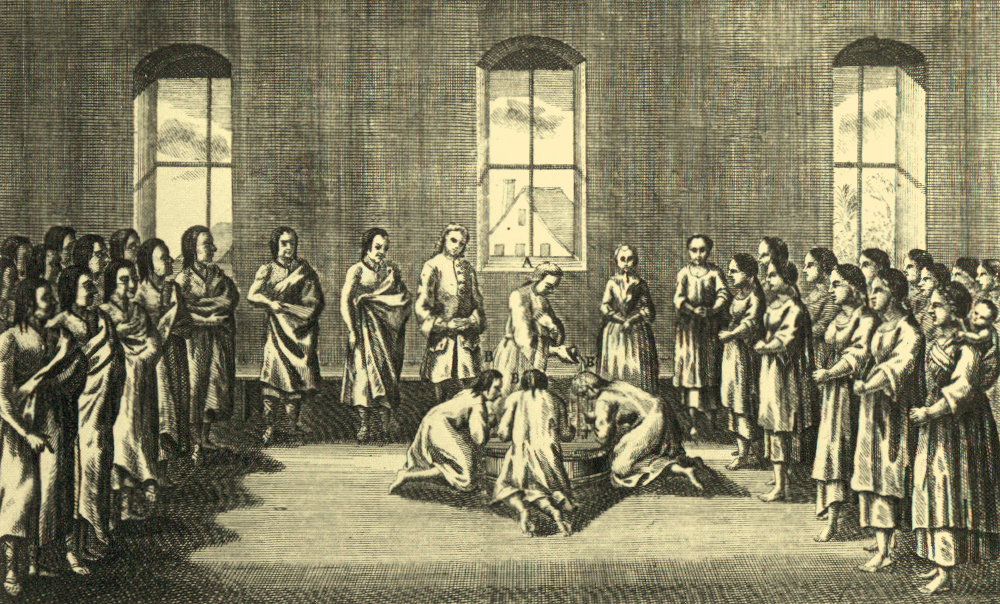
Moravian missionary baptising Munsee-Delawares (Lenape) in "Old Chapel" in Bethlehem, PA

The beginning of the church's work in North America is usually given as 1740, when Bishop August Gottlieb Spangenberg sent Christian Henry Rauch to New York City on a mission to preach and convert native peoples. Eager to learn more, the Mahican chiefs Tschoop and Shabash invited Rauch to visit their village (in present-day Dutchess County) to teach them. In September 1740, they led him to Shekomeko, where he established a Moravian mission. The two Indian chiefs converted to the Christian faith. By summer 1742, Shekomeko was established as the first native Christian congregation in the present-day United States. Over the next two years, the Moravians endeavored to reconcile the ancient Indian traditions with the new ways of the western society. They made a center for missions to the native peoples. Within the next two years, several more missionaries along with their wives began to settle in the area. Among these were Gottlob Buettner and his wife, Anna Margaret Bechtel, daughter of a minister. Meanwhile, European settlers who opposed the Moravians' defense of Native Americans spread rumors that they were secret Catholic Jesuits allied with the French, British enemies. Such settlers finally were successful in persuading the colonial governor Clinton to restrict the missionaries' efforts. They were expelled in 1744. Buettner died at Shekomeko early in 1745, and the colony dwindled away soon after.

The Moravians were more successful in Pennsylvania, where the charter of the colony provided religious freedom. The towns of Bethlehem, Nazareth, Emmaus, and Lititz, Pennsylvania, were founded as Moravian communities. Graceham, Maryland was founded as a Moravian Community on October 8, 1758, organized by Bishop Matthew Hehl. Later, colonies were also founded in North Carolina, where Moravians led by Bishop August Gottlieb Spangenberg purchased 98,985 acres (400.58 km^{2}) from John Carteret, 2nd Earl Granville. This large tract of land was named die Wachau, or Wachovia, after one of Zinzendorf's ancestral estates on the Danube River in Austria. The towns established in Wachovia included Bethabara (1753), Bethania (1759) and Salem (now Winston-Salem) (1766).

Bethlehem emerged as the headquarters of the northern church, and Winston-Salem became the headquarters of the southern church. The Moravian denomination continues in America to this day, with congregations in 18 states. The highest concentrations of Moravians exist in Bethlehem and Winston-Salem. The denomination is organized into four provinces in North America: Northern (which includes five Canadian congregations), Southern, Alaska, and Labrador.

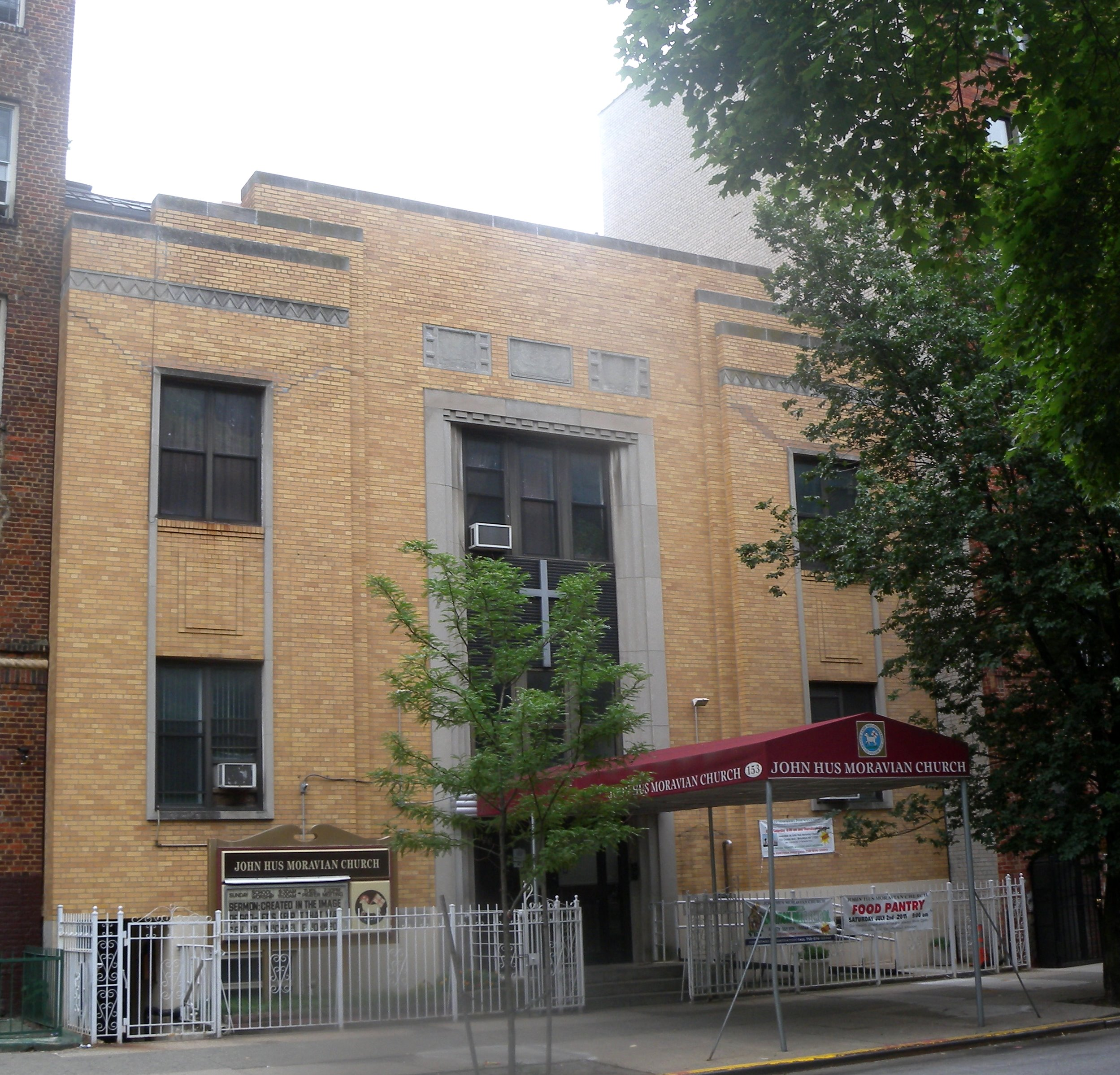
Jan Hus Moravian, Brooklyn

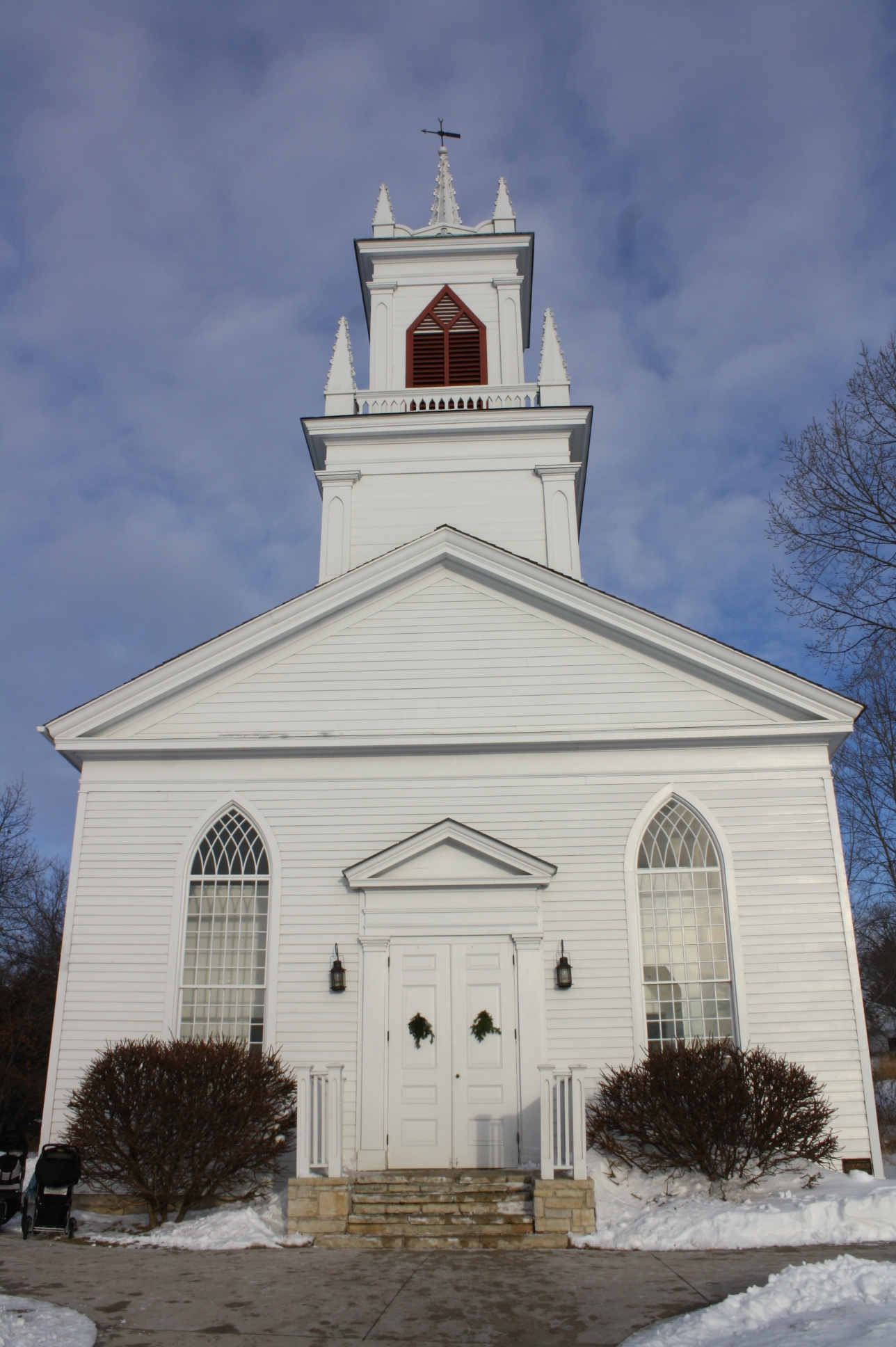
East Side Moravian Church in Green Bay, Wisconsin.

== Society and theology in America ==
Rohrer (2001) demonstrates the social history of the community of Wachovia, founded in the North Carolina Piedmont in 1753, illustrates the importance of the beliefs and practices of the Moravians in achieving the integration and acculturation of settlers of different ethnic backgrounds. The Moravian emphasis on openness and tolerance, combined with the conversion experience of new birth, undermined ethnic homogeneity and provided a source of communal cohesion. The primary intermingling and intermarriage was between Germans and English, but 12 nations and territories were represented in the population of Wachovia by the early 19th century.

Fogleman (2003) examines the theological, demographic, and sociological roots of factional clashes between Moravians and their more traditional German Lutheran and Reformed coreligionists, focusing on mid-18th-century communities in Pennsylvania and New Jersey, where these confrontations were frequent and sometimes violent. Moravians' beliefs centered on a feminized Holy Spirit, the right of women to preach, sacralizing the sex act, and metaphorically re-gendering Jesus Christ. These teachings were perceived as threats to more mainstream Christian articles of faith, which stressed the masculinity of the Trinity as the theological cornerstone of the nuclear patriarchal family, the core structure in upholding moral and social order. As Moravian preachers far outnumbered the very few Lutheran or Reformed clergy in the mid-Atlantic colonies during the 1730s–40's and because the Moravians welcomed anyone into their church services, most German Pietists viewed Moravians as more than harmless heretics. Moreover, in the temporal context of a period of intense European immigration to the colonies, the Moravians were seen as challenging the long-term social stability of the colonial community as a whole. Although the Moravians never became a dominant sect in the region, the perception of them as a serious religious and social threat highlights the significant role gendered power issues have played in religious controversy in North America.

Engel (2003) says Moravians in Bethlehem 1753–75 were concerned about the economic prosperity of their settlements, but they were also concerned about the effects that prosperity might have on their religious community. Prosperity was important, as it funded both mission work and more settlements. Moravians valued work highly, but economic ventures had to be carried out in a way morally consistent with their beliefs. To this end, Bethlehem Moravians cooperated in the opening of the Strangers' Store in 1753. The store was the main instrument both in purchasing outside goods for the community and in selling Bethlehem goods to outsiders. Wise management meant the Strangers' Store remained profitable for the rest of the colonial period, funding the growth of Moravian enterprises both in Pennsylvania and back in Germany.

== Architecture ==
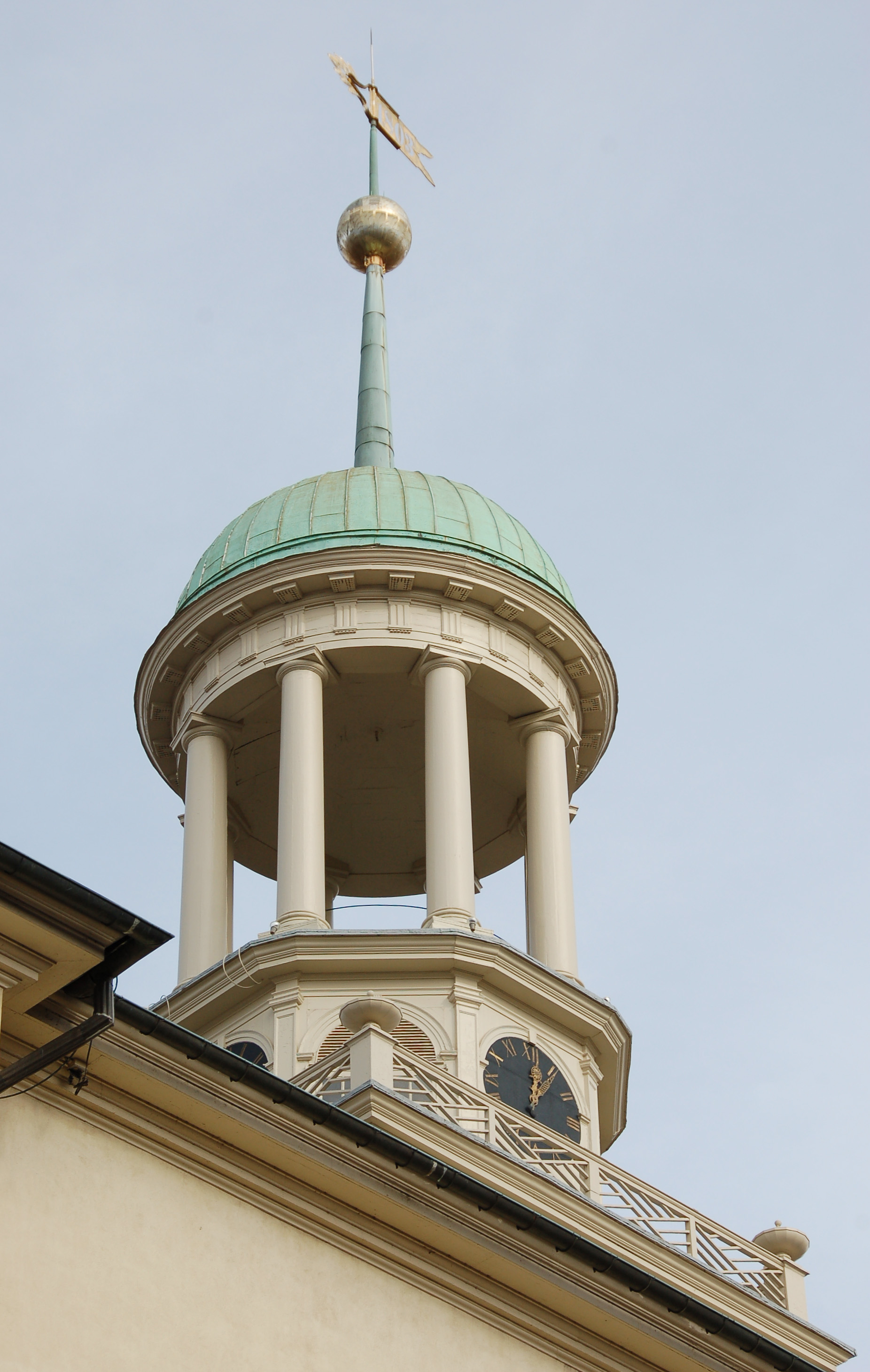
The copper steeple on the church in Bethlehem, Pennsylvania

A Moravian architecture style has emerged in the United States, predominately in Winston-Salem (Old Salem). Some Moravian churches in the area feature copper steeple tops which have oxidized and reached a green patina. The Moravian "Bonnet" or "eyebrow" arch is also an example of the style and is mainly used over building entrances, it is an unsupported half cylinder. Combined Moravian arches were used to form the dome of the Wachovia Center (now called 100 North Main Street).

== Organization ==
The Moravian Church in America is divided into a Northern and Southern Province. Each province is headed by an elders' conference composed of both lay and ordained members.

The Northern Province is subdivided into the Eastern and Western Districts, as well as the Moravian Church in Canada.

== Ecumenical relations ==
The Moravian Church in United States is:

- in full communion with the United Methodist Church
- in full communion with the Evangelical Lutheran Church in America
- in full communion with the Episcopal Church (United States)
- engaged in dialogue with a group of Reformed Churches: Presbyterian Church (USA), United Church of Christ, and Reformed Church in America
- engaged in dialogue with the Christian Church (Disciples of Christ)
- a Participant in Christian Churches Together in the USA
- a member church of the World Council of Churches
- a member of the National Council of Churches of Christ in the USA
- a member of Churches for Middle East Peace.

The Moravian Church in Canada (part of the Moravian Church Northern Province) is:

- in full communion with the Evangelical Lutheran Church in Canada
- in full communion with the Anglican Church of Canada

Historically the Moravian Church had a significant impact on John Wesley and the practices of the Methodist Church.

== Education ==
=== Schools ===
- Moravian Academy, Bethlehem, Pennsylvania
- Salem Academy, Winston-Salem, North Carolina

=== Tertiary institutions ===
- Moravian University and Moravian Theological Seminary, Bethlehem, Pennsylvania
- Salem College, Winston-Salem, North Carolina

== Beliefs ==
The church ordains women as ministers and bishops.

=== Marriage ===
In 2014, the Moravian Church Northern Province voted in favor of opening up ordination to gay and lesbian ministers and to allow local churches to decide about blessings of same-sex marriage.

In 2018, the Southern Province voted in favor of opening up ordination to gay and lesbian clergy to be married to their same-sex partners and leaves decisions regarding marriage of gay and lesbian individuals to the individual congregations.

== Social issues ==
On reproductive issues, the Northern Province has encouraged conversation, and the Moravian Church in America supports the right to abortion for certain situations.

== See also ==
- Adelaide Fries

== Bibliography ==
- Atwood, Craig D. Community of the Cross: Moravian Piety in Colonial Bethlehem. Pennsylvania State U. Press, 2004. 283 pp.
- Atwood, Craig D. and Vogt, Peter, ed. The Distinctiveness of Moravian Culture: Essays and Documents in Moravian History in Honor of Vernon H. Nelson on His Seventieth Birthday. Moravian Hist. Soc., 2003. 297 pp.
- Engel, Katherine Carté. "The Strangers' Store: Moral Capitalism in Moravian Bethlehem, 1753–1775." Early American Studies 2003 1(1): 90–126. ISSN 1543-4273
- Engel, Katherine Carte. Pilgrims and Profit: Moravians in Early America. University of Pennsylvania Press, 2009.
- Fogleman, Aaron Spencer. Jesus Is Female: Moravians and Radical Religion in Early America. University of Pennsylvania Press, 2007.
- Gollin, Gilliam Lindt. Moravians in Two Worlds (1967)
- Langton; Edward. History of the Moravian Church: The Story of the First International Protestant Church (1956).
- Rechcigl, Miloslav, Jr. "The Renewal and Formative Years of the Moravian Church in America," Czechoslovak and Central European Journal 9 (1990), pp. 12–26.
- Rohrer, S. Scott. "Searching for Land and God: the Pietist Migration to North Carolina in the Late Colonial Period." North Carolina Historical Review 2002 79(4): 409–439. ISSN 0029-2494 Fulltext: in Ebsco
- Rohrer, S. Scott. "Evangelism and Acculturation in the Backcountry: the Case of Wachovia, North Carolina, 1753–1830." Journal of the Early Republic 2001 21(2): 199–229. ISSN 0275-1275 Fulltext: in Jstor
- Wagner, Walter H. The Zinzendorf-Muhlenberg Encounter: A Controversy in Search of Understanding. Moravian Hist. Soc., 2002. 173 pp.

=== Primary sources ===
- Zeisberger, David. The Moravian Mission Diaries of David Zeisberger, 1772–1781. ed by Hermann Wellenreuther and Carola Wessel, ed.; Julie Tomberlin Weber, transl. Pennsylvania State U. Press, 2005. 666 pp.
