= Lutheran Theological Seminary at Philadelphia =

The Lutheran Theological Seminary at Philadelphia
- Type: Seminary
- Active: 1864–2017 merger
- Location: Philadelphia, Pennsylvania, U.S. 40°03′43″N 75°11′30″W
- Campus: 14 acres (57,000 m^{2})
- Affiliations: Evangelical Lutheran Church in America
- Website: www.unitedlutheranseminary.edu

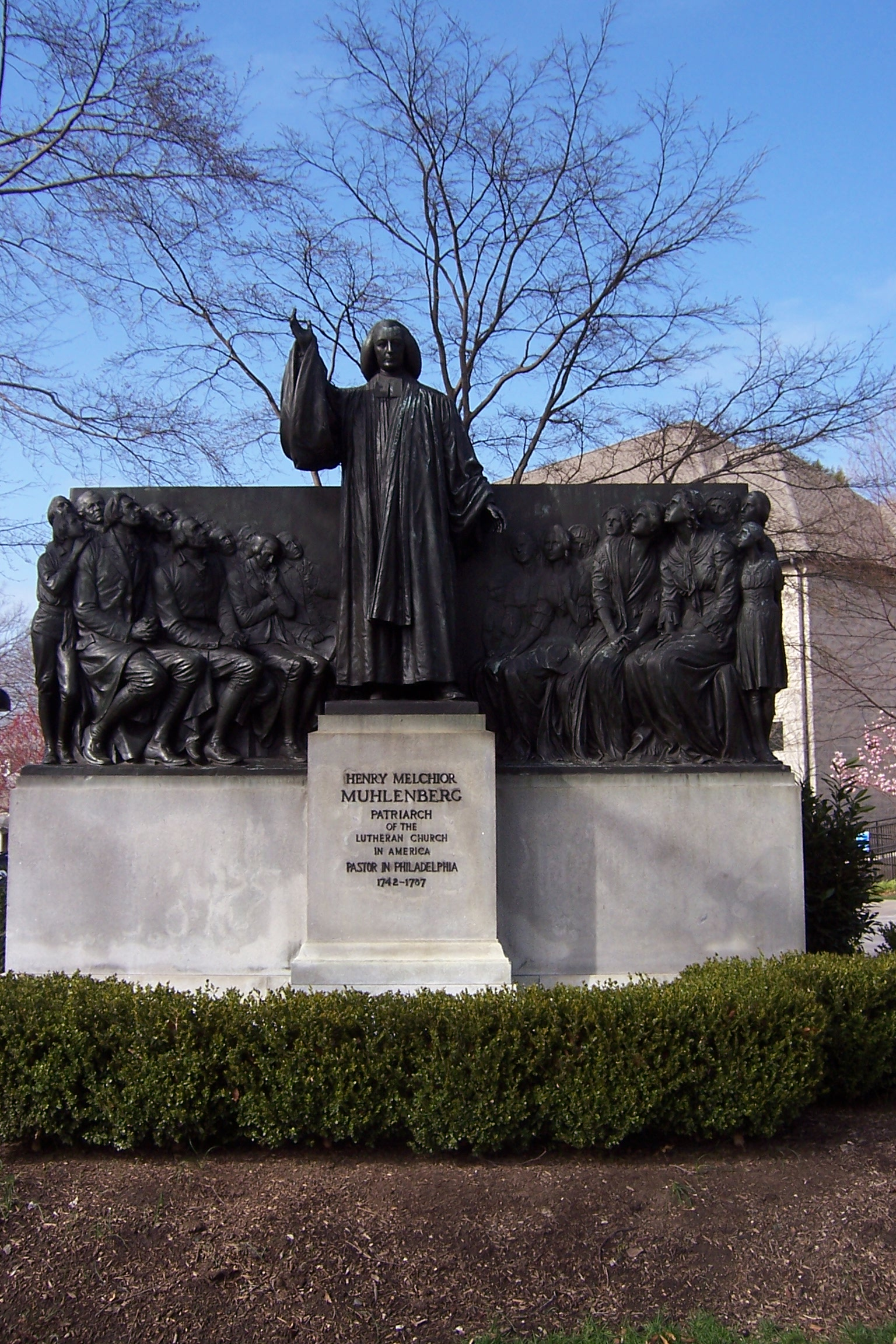
Henry Melchior Muhlenberg, (1711-1787) monument

The Lutheran Theological Seminary at Philadelphia (LTSP) was one of eight theological seminaries associated with the Evangelical Lutheran Church in America, the largest Lutheran denomination in North America. It is located on Germantown Avenue in the Mount Airy neighborhood of northwestern Philadelphia. Founded in 1864, it has its roots in the Pennsylvania Ministerium established in 1748 in Philadelphia by Henry Melchior Muhlenberg.

The seminary had an enrollment of 275 graduate students, with 17 full-time professors. Students come from a number of Christian traditions in addition to the ELCA, including Anglican/Episcopal, African Methodist Episcopal, Baptist, Methodist, Church of God in Christ, and Mennonite.

In July 2017, the seminary merged with Lutheran Theological Seminary at Gettysburg to become United Lutheran Seminary. As of November 2023, Rev. Dr. R. Guy Erwin serves as president, having begun his appointment to the position in August 2020.

== History ==
The background of The Lutheran Theological Seminary at Philadelphia dates back to the founding of the Pennsylvania Ministerium in 1748 by Henry Melchior Muhlenberg, the first organized Lutheran church body in North America. LTSP. was founded in 1864, partly in response to the theology being taught at the Lutheran Theological Seminary at Gettysburg, which had been established in 1826 about 60 miles (97 km) further west from the Delaware River in the south-central part of the Commonwealth of Pennsylvania. The Gettysburg seminary was thought to be too committed to American cultural accommodation rather than confessional Evangelical Lutheran orthodoxy. The Pennsylvania Ministerium had withdrawn that same year (1864) from the Evangelical Lutheran General Synod of the United States of North America and in 1867 helped form the more conservative General Council of the Evangelical Lutheran Church in North America. The rivalry between the two Pennsylvania religious schools continued until July 2017, when the two schools joined to become United Lutheran Seminary with campuses in Philadelphia and Gettysburg.

For its first two decades, LTSP was at Franklin Square in Philadelphia's Center City. In 1889, it moved to Mount Airy in the then northwestern suburbs of the city. The first seminary building on campus, now known as "Old Dorm", was built in 1889 and faced the center of the campus. It was behind the Gowan Mansion, now known as Hagan Hall, which faces Germantown Avenue, a historic road from colonial times that runs northwest out of downtown Philadelphia. That building is now incorporated into the modern facade of The Brossman Center.

The Philadelphia Seminary's Graduate School was established about a quarter-century later in 1913. By 1938, the Lutheran Seminary had become accredited by the American Association of Theological Schools. The Urban Theological Institute (UTI), was established in 1980 to provide accredited Saturday and evening programs for African American church leaders. The UTI now oversees the Black Church programs in the first professional and doctor of ministry degrees, and offers certificate programs for church leaders, and sponsors lectures on topics relating to the Black Church as well as the annual "Preaching with Power" series each March.

Many national and regional church leaders, both Lutheran and non-Lutheran, have graduated from or served as faculty members of LTSP, including former ELCA Presiding Bishop H. George Anderson and former Presiding Bishop of the Episcopal Church in the United States of America Frank Griswold,. Lutheran church theologian Theodore Emanuel Schmauk was president of the LSTP Board of Directors from 1908 until 1920 and in charge of the Department of Ethics, Apologetics and Pedagogy from 1911 until 1920. Additionally, the presidents of four American Lutheran theological seminaries have been faculty members at LTSP.

== Merger ==
In January 2016, the seminary's board announced a merger with the Lutheran Theological Seminary at Gettysburg. While originally planned as a closure of both schools with the formation of a new institution, this plan was canceled over accreditation issues and a merger of the two schools was completed July 1, 2017, under the name United Lutheran Seminary.

== Degrees ==
LTSP offered as first professional degrees the M.Div. (Master of Divinity), the M.A.R. (Master of Arts in Religion), and the M.A.P.L. (Master of Arts in Public Leadership). LTSP also offered as second professional degrees the S.T.M. (Master of Sacred Theology), D.Min. (Doctor of Ministry) and Ph.D. (Doctor of Philosophy). The seminary was accredited by the nationwide Association of Theological Schools in the United States and Canada and by the regional Middle States Association of Colleges and Schools. In 2006, LTSP awarded 46 degrees to Lutherans and 20 to non-Lutherans. In comparison to the other seven seminaries of the ELCA, LTSP graduated the most second-professional-degree students and by far the most non-Lutheran students from other ecumenical denominational bodies.

== Campus ==
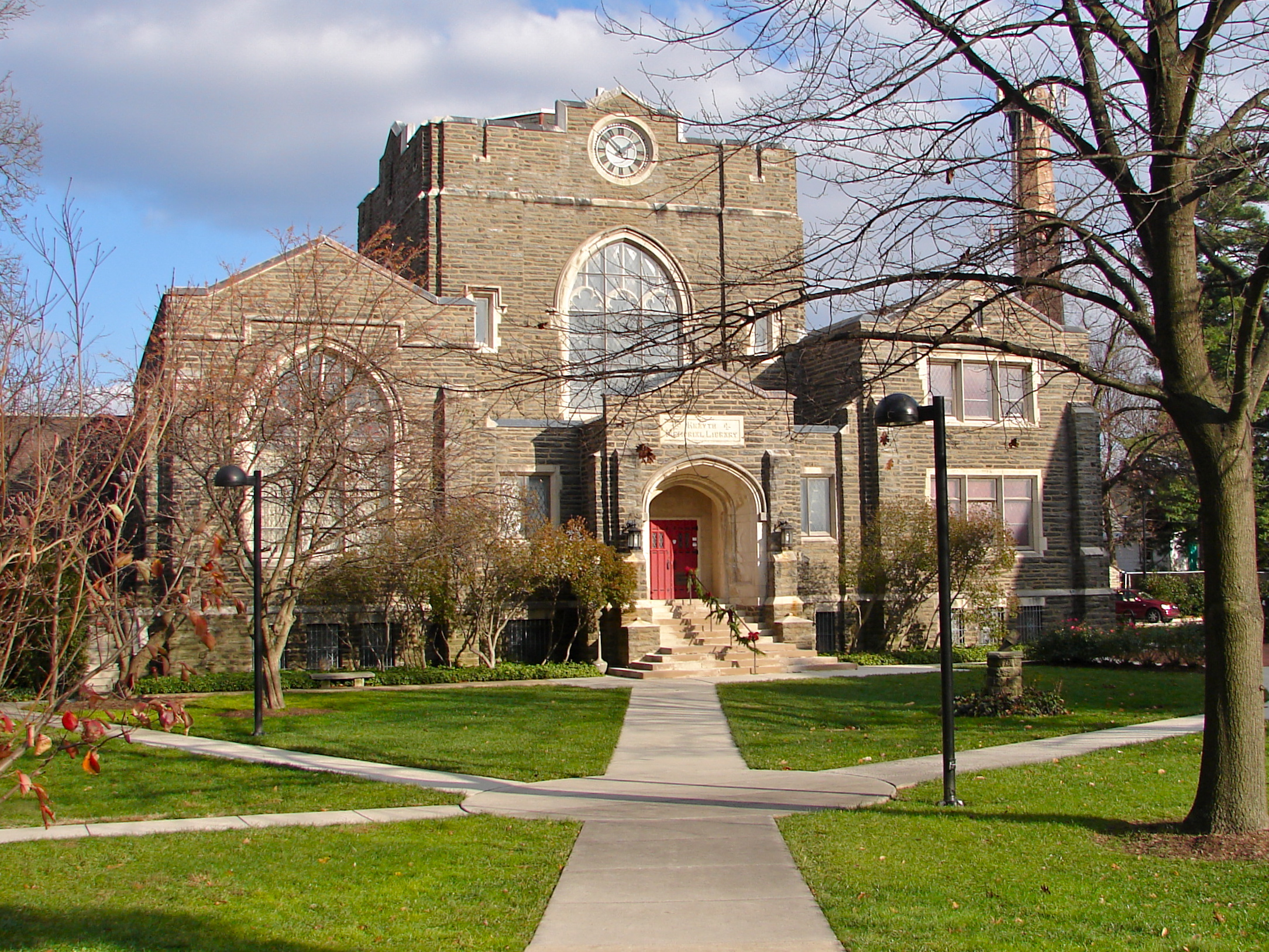
Krauth Memorial Library

The school has a 14-acre (57,000 m^{2}) campus in the Mount Airy neighborhood of Philadelphia. The site was originally the estate of William Allen, a prominent colonial-era Pennsylvanian; the neighborhood gets its name from Allen's estate.

The Krauth Memorial Library, with 198,000 volumes, is named in memory of Charles Porterfield Krauth. It includes material dating back to the 16th century, including the 18th-century work of Henry Melchior Muhlenberg, who is known as the Father of American Lutheranism. The library's 100th anniversary of scholarship and service fell during the 2008–2009 academic year, and the facility includes the original glass flooring and metal shelving in the main space. Also notable in the library is the Doberstein window.

The Schaeffer-Ashmead Chapel, renovated in 2004, is the campus worship center, and is adjacent to the William Allen Plaza, completed in 2009 as a public space that is used by both the seminary and Mt. Airy communities. A peace pole was donated by the class of 2010 and erected on the plaza. A bronze statue of Muhlenberg, dedicated in 1917, commemorates the 175th anniversary of his arrival in America. This statue was originally commissioned to stand on public land in Fairmount Park. Due to anti-German sentiment during the World War I, the city of Philadelphia sought out a less prominent location for the statue and gladly donated it to the seminary. An annual tradition at the seminary is for first-year students to decorate the statue early in the fall semester and at other times during the academic year.

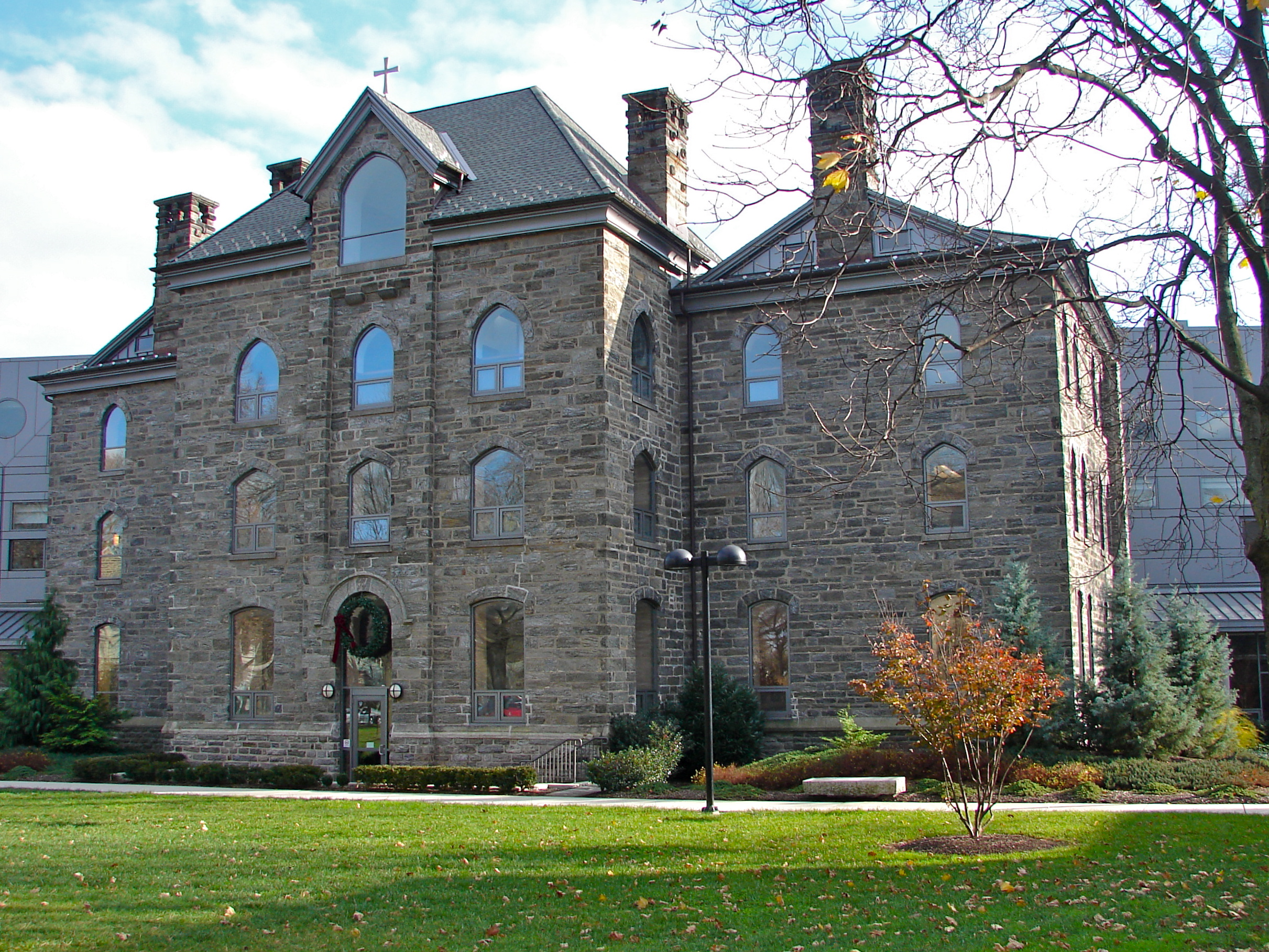
Brossman Center

The Brossman Center opened in the fall of 2005 and contains classrooms, offices for faculty and administration, as well as meeting rooms, and a large flexible space named Benbow Hall, which is used as assembly and lecture space, and for community gatherings and banquets. The undercroft of the Brossman Center includes the Northeast Regional Archives of the Evangelical Lutheran Church in America, known as the Lutheran Archives Center at Philadelphia, as well as compact storage for materials from the Krauth Memorial Library collection.

Wiedemann Hall contains student housing and the offices of the Southeastern Pennsylvania Synod of the ELCA. Other students live in "perimeter housing," homes split into apartments located on the north side of the campus.

== Notable faculty ==
- Henry Eyster Jacobs
- Charles Porterfield Krauth
- Timothy Lull
- Frederick Nolde
- Paul Rajashekar
- Theodore G. Tappert

== Notable alumni ==
- H. George Anderson
- Frank Buchman
- W. D. Coleman
- G. Devasahayam
- K. Devasahayam
- Katrina Foster
- Franklin Clark Fry
- Suppogu Joseph
- Heidi Neumark
- Beale M. Schmucker
- John Steinbruck
- Astor C. Wuchter

== See also ==
- List of ELCA seminaries
- Colonial Germantown Historic District
