= April Ulring Larson =

20th and 21st-century American Lutheran bishop

Bishop April Ulring Larson
- Elected: 1992
- Term ended: 2008
- Predecessor: Stephen Guttormson
- Successor: Jim Arends

Orders
- Ordination: 1978

Personal details
- Born: April 22, 1950 (age 76) Decorah, Iowa
- Denomination: Lutheran
- Spouse: Judd Larson
- Children: Amy (b. 1978), Katie (b. 1978), Ben (b. 1984 – d. 2010)
- Occupation: Bishop
- Education: Wartburg Theological Seminary, University of Iowa

April Ulring Larson (born April Ulring; April 22, 1950) is an American retired Lutheran bishop. In 1992, she became the first woman to be elected to serve as a bishop by the Evangelical Lutheran Church in America (ELCA).

== Early life and education ==
Born April Ulring in Decorah, Iowa, on April 22, 1950, Larson was the second of five children. After high school, she studied music at Luther College in her hometown of Decorah for two years from 1968 to 1970 before transferring to the University of Iowa in 1970. In 1972, she graduated from the University of Iowa with a degree in vocal music. After graduation, she taught music for two years at a Roman Catholic school in Cresco, Iowa. Music had and continues to have a large impact on her life.

In regard to music, Larson once said:

"I used to be just scared to death of eternity. I would just kind of wake up in the middle of the night thinking about millions and millions of years with God. What is that going to be like and what are you going to do? And I'd just get myself kind of into a sweat. And then I realized that if God would let me sing for all of eternity, I could do that. I could do that."

However, feeling drawn to ministry, Larson began seminary at Wartburg Theological Seminary in Dubuque, Iowa, in 1974 and graduated in 1977, being one of the first 10 women to do so.

Larson has also been presented with Honorary Doctor of Divinity degrees from Wartburg Theological Seminary and Luther College.

== Early career ==
Larson was ordained into the Ministry of Word and Sacrament in February, 1978.

After her ordination, Larson spent the next 12 years serving as a parish pastor in Iowa. Over the 12 years, Larson worked at three separate churches. She also served on the Northeastern Iowa Transition Team, became the District trainer of the Search Bible Study congregational lecturers, and was a member of the Iowa District Theological Task Force that authorized Evangelism Guidelines for Congregations. In 1989, Larson became Assistant to the Bishop in the Southeastern Minnesota Synod.

== Election as bishop ==
Larson was initially reluctant to run for bishop, since no woman had yet become one in the ELCA. While serving as assistant to the bishop, Larson would deny requests from various synods to put her name on their ballot. She accepted the La Crosse Synod nomination because she did not know many people in the synod, and was not initially interested in winning, nor did she expect to win.

However, Larson was elected bishop of the Lacrosse Area Synod of the ELCA on June 22, 1992, at the age of 42 and was re-elected twice, in 1996 and 2002. After serving three terms, the maximum term-limit allowed by the ELCA, Larson stepped down after 16 years as the La Crosse Bishop on October 1, 2008.

== Ministry as bishop ==
As bishop, Larson oversaw the La Crosse Area Synod, which included 43,600 members from 81 congregations in 10 counties in western Wisconsin and southeastern Minnesota. Larson participated in service as a member of the Lutheran World Relief Board and the Luther College Board of Regents. She was a member of the Executive Committee and Chair of the Agenda Committee of the Conference of Bishops of the ELCA, served from 1988 to 1993 as a member of the ELCA Task Force on the Study of Ministry, and spent two years as President of the Wisconsin Council of Churches.

Additionally, Larson has contributed through artistic pursuits. She has written chapters in Augsburg/Fortress books and was a writer for Word & World. In 1996, she was the choral director for the La Crosse Area Synod All Saints Choral Fest.

In the church wide election for presiding bishop, Larson was the runner-up and, in 2001, she was a finalist for presiding bishop. She was the preacher at the installation of Bishop H. George Anderson in 1995 and served as a commencement preacher at five ELCA seminaries. Furthermore, she received the Wittenberg Award from the Luther Institute in Washington, D.C., and the Distinguished Service Award from California Lutheran University.

== Lutheran World Federation in Hong Kong ==
In 1997, Larson was a delegate to the 50th anniversary of the Lutheran World Federation (LWF) in Hong Kong. While there, she presided at the Eucharist that symbolized the mark of the 50th anniversary of the LWF. This was the first LWF where almost half of the delegates who were in attendance were women. At the conference, they reaffirmed the LWF's commitment to ordaining women but also acknowledged that some of the member churches differed in their commitment to this goal.

Ten years after the LWF assembly in Hong Kong, Larson was also a delegate and as a presenter at the 60th anniversary assembly in Lund, Sweden.

== Influence on women in ministry ==
The ELCA, which is the largest Lutheran denomination in the United States, first began to ordain women in 1970. When Larson was elected Bishop, she became the second female Lutheran bishop in the world, and the first in North America. Additionally, Larson was the first to be elected by a synod.

The election of Larson as bishop began a wave of women in ministry throughout the ELCA with three women, including Larson, becoming candidates to serve as the presiding bishop of the ELCA in 1995. By 2001, the next election, that number had increased to seven. Also in 2001, Margarita Martinez, a woman of color, became a bishop for the Caribbean Synod. The number of female clergy in the ELCA had increased to 2,573 by 2002, the same year that the Evangelical Lutheran Church in Canada (ELCIC) elected its first female bishop with the election of Cynthia Halmarson.

By 2008, 7 of the 65 bishops in the ELCA were women and 10 were by 2017.

In 2013 the ELCA elected its first female presiding bishop with the election of Elizabeth Eaton.

By 2016, 35 percent of the 9,250 active and ordained clergy in the ELCA were women, which grew from only 20 percent in 2000. Currently, 50 percent of seminary students are women.

== Personal life ==
After graduating from the University of Iowa, Ulring married Judd Larson, and the two attended Wartburg Theological Seminary together, and would later serve as co-pastors together in Iowa for three parishes. They had twin daughters in 1978, both of whom became physicians, and each have three children. In 1984, Larson gave birth to a son, Ben. Ben graduated from Luther College in 2006 and went on to Wartburg Theological Seminary, but died in 2010 while on a mission trip in Haiti during the 2010 Haiti earthquake. Along with Larson on the trip was his wife (Renee) and his cousin (Jonathan) when the building they were staying in collapsed, killing him but not Renee or Jonathan.
