= Katrina Foster =

American Lutheran bishop

The Right Reverend Katrina Foster
- Bishop of the Metropolitan New York Synod
- Church: Evangelical Lutheran Church in America
- Diocese: Metropolitan New York
- Elected: May 3, 2025
- In office: 2025–present
- Predecessor: Paul Egensteiner

Orders
- Ordination: December 4, 1994
- Consecration: November 22, 2025 by Yehiel Curry

Personal details
- Born: Katrina D. Foster
- Denomination: Lutheranism
- Spouse: Pamela Kallimanis
- Children: 1
- Education: Newberry College (BA); Lutheran Theological Southern Seminary (MDiv); Lutheran Theological Seminary at Philadelphia (DDiv)

Katrina D. Foster is an American Lutheran prelate who has served as the Bishop of the Metropolitan New York Synod of the Evangelical Lutheran Church in America since May 3, 2025. She is the first woman and the first openly gay person to serve as bishop of the Metropolitan New York Synod.

== Education ==
Foster earned a bachelor of arts degree in religion, philosophy, and sociology from Newberry College in 1990. She earned a master of divinity degree from the Lutheran Theological Southern Seminary in 1995 and a doctorate of divinity from the Lutheran Theological Seminary at Philadelphia in 2008.

== Career ==
She was ordained on December 4, 1994 and served as a pastor at Fordham Evangelical Lutheran Church in New York City from 1994 to 2010. She risked being defrocked in 2007, prior to a change in the Evangelical Lutheran Church, for coming out as gay and marrying a woman. She later served as a pastor at St. Michael's Lutheran Church in Amagansett and at Incarnation Lutheran Church in Bridgehampton from 2010 to 2015. From 2015 to 2025, she served as a pastor at St. John's Lutheran Church in Brooklyn.

=== Episcopacy ===
On May 3, 2025, Foster was elected to serve a six-year term as the bishop of the Metropolitan New York Synod of the Evangelical Lutheran Church in America. She was elected on the fifth ballot with 196 votes, finishing ahead of Rev. Stephanie Jaeger of Trinity Lutheran Church, who received 144 votes. She succeeded Bishop Paul Egensteiner. Foster is the first woman and the first openly gay bishop of the Metropolitan New York Synod. She was formally installed on November 22, 2025 at the Cathedral of St. John the Divine by Presiding Bishop Yehiel Curry.

== Personal life ==
Foster is originally from Fernandina Beach, Florida. She lives in The Bronx. She is lesbian. Foster is married to Pamela Kallimanis. They have one daughter, Zoia.
