= Heidi Neumark =

American author

Heidi Neumark (born March 9, 1954) is the author of the book Breathing Space: A Spiritual Journey in the South Bronx (Beacon Press).

== Biography ==
She grew up in Summit, New Jersey and now lives on the Upper West Side with her husband Gregorio Orellano of Manhattan, and has two children, Ana and Hans. Rev. Neumark received her undergraduate degree from Brown University and completed her Master of Divinity at the Lutheran Theological Seminary at Philadelphia.

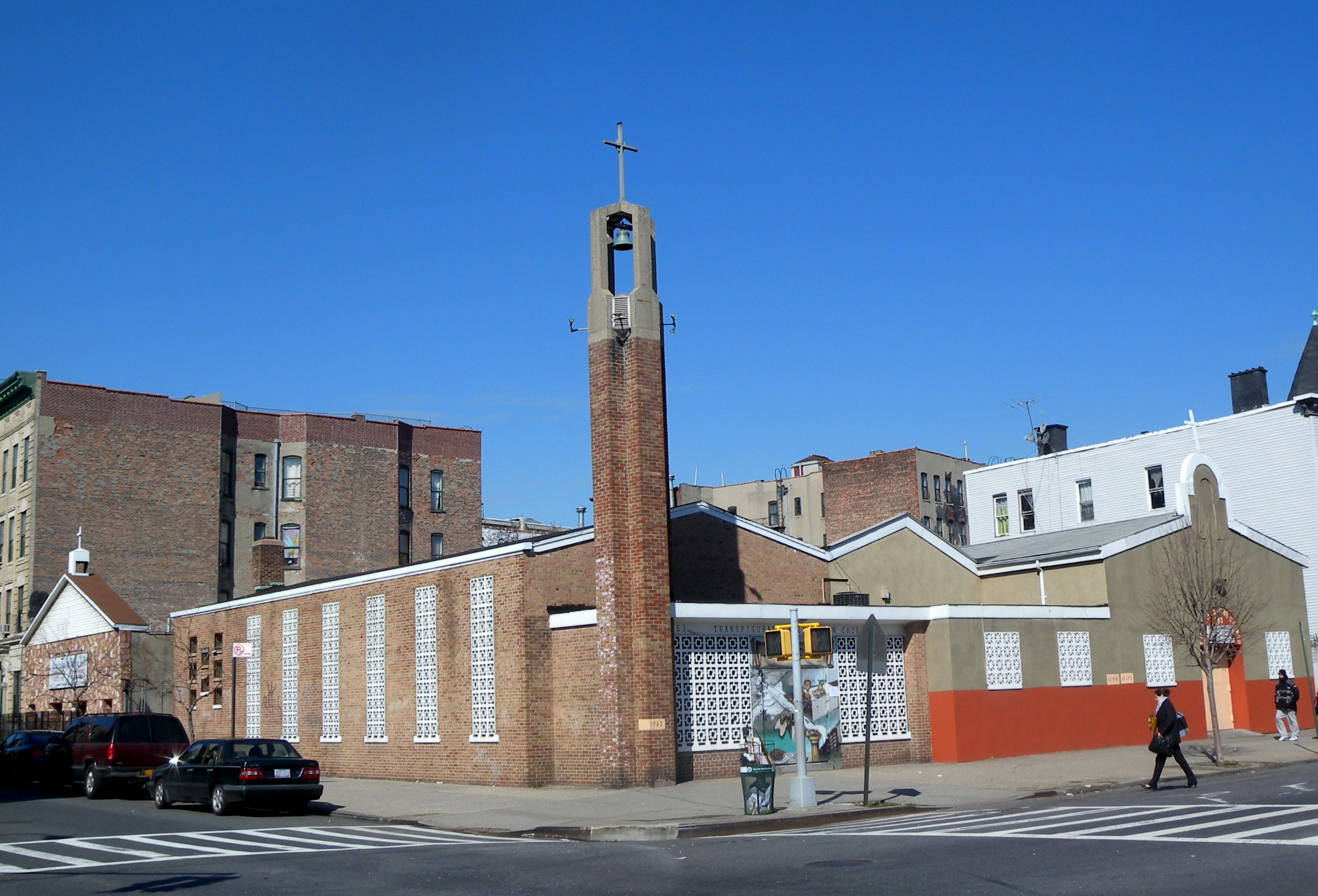
Transfiguration Lutheran Church

Neumark spent 20 years at Transfiguration Lutheran Church in the South Bronx before moving to Trinity. She is the pastor of Trinity Lutheran Church on West 100th Street in Manhattan. Trinity Lutheran Church describes itself as "a congregation of the Evangelical Lutheran Church in America. Trinity is a Reconciling in Christ congregation, meaning we welcome all people, including gay, lesbian, bisexual, and transgender individuals and couples as fully participating members of our ministry. We encourage worshippers who are uncomfortable with the nouns and pronouns in the liturgy and hymns that convey a gender for God to substitute a word or words that better express their praise of the Triune God."

From Publishers Weekly

In 1984, when Neumark became pastor of Transfiguration Lutheran Church, the South Bronx was groaning under decades of neglect. A 1976 HUD policy called "planned shrinkage" had radically reduced city services, including hospitals and schools, and only people too poor to move elsewhere remained in this area of sewage treatment plants and torched apartment buildings. For 19 years Neumark lived and worked among addicts, pushers, prostitutes, people with AIDS, abused women and children and gang members, without abandoning hope: "I am drawn to a different vision-the walls rebuilt, the land reclaimed, the people who rise up like grass improbably breaking through slabs of stone." A gifted storyteller, she portrays people who, despite personal tragedies and minimal resources, band together to build low-income housing, create first-rate schools, restore their church, plant trees and help each other through crises. People like Burnice, who initially came to church to pick up Christmas gifts, intending to trade them for drugs and then kill herself with an overdose; but who kept coming back, got her GED, found a job and is now a leader in church and community. "Some future pillars of the church arrive in ruins," Neumark wryly notes. With its hard-nosed realism and passion for God, this memoir should appeal to people of faith across the political spectrum.

Copyright 2003 Reed Business Information, Inc"

Neumark often lectures at colleges around the United States and writes weekly sermons for her congregation.

== Selected works ==
1. 2002 - Breathing Space: A Spiritual Journey in the South Bronx (ISBN 0-8070-7256-7)
2. 2015 - Hidden Inheritance: Family Secrets, Memory and Faith ISBN 978-1630881245
3. 2020 - Sanctuary: Being Christian in the Wake of Trump ISBN 978-0-8028-7839-7
