= List of ELCA seminaries =

Current seminaries of the Evangelical Lutheran Church in America (ELCA):

- Luther Seminary (Saint Paul, Minnesota)
- Lutheran School of Theology at Chicago
- United Lutheran Seminary (Gettysburg and Philadelphia, Pennsylvania)
- Lutheran Theological Southern Seminary (Hickory, North Carolina): merged with Lenoir–Rhyne University, an ELCA University
- Pacific Lutheran Theological Seminary (Berkeley, California): merged with California Lutheran University, an ELCA University
- Trinity Lutheran Seminary (Columbus, Ohio): merged with Capital University, an ELCA University
- Wartburg Theological Seminary (Dubuque, Iowa)

In addition, the ELCA sponsors the following seminary education programs, which are not on the campus of an ELCA seminary:

- Lutheran Seminary Program in the Southwest (Austin, Texas)
- Lutheran Theological Center in Atlanta (Georgia)

Former seminaries of the Evangelical Lutheran Church in America:

- Lutheran Theological Seminary at Gettysburg (Gettysburg, Pennsylvania): merged with Lutheran Theological Seminary at Philadelphia to form United Lutheran Seminary
- Lutheran Theological Seminary at Philadelphia (Philadelphia, Pennsylvania): merged with Lutheran Theological Seminary at Gettysburg to form United Lutheran Seminary
