= Landay (poetry) =

Traditional Afghan poetic form consisting of a single couplet

The Landay (Pashto: لنډۍ) is a traditional Afghan poetic form consisting of a single couplet. There are nine syllables in the first line, and thirteen syllables in the second. These short poems typically address themes of love, grief, homeland, war, and separation. The poetic form, traditionally sung aloud, was likely brought into Afghanistan by Aryan nomads thousands of years ago. "Landay," in Pashto, means "short, poisonous snake", likely an allusion to its minimal length and use of sarcasm.

== Pronunciation/Etymology ==
In Pashto, "landay (LAND-ee)" means "short, poisonous snake," likely an allusion to its minimal length and use of sarcasm. Landays (or landai) often criticize traditions and gender roles.

== History ==
Afghan culture values literature very highly, particularly classical Persian literature and Pashto literature and poetry.

== Form ==
There are few formal properties. Each landay consists of a single, twenty-two syllable couplet. There are nine syllables in the first lines, and thirteen syllables in the second. In Pashto, the poem ends on a "ma" or "na" sound. The lines do not generally rhyme.

They are thought to be related to shloka.

Like the couplets of a ghazal, landai in sequence work "independently and sometimes can be grouped with others according to subject matter."

== Themes ==
- War (Pashto: jang)
- Separation (biltoon)
- Patriotism (watan)
- Grief (gham)
- Love (meena)

== Important Poets ==
- Rahila Muska
- Malalai

== Examples ==
- I Am the Beggar of the World by Eliza Griswold
