= Elizabeth Eaton =

American Lutheran bishop (born 1955)

The Reverend Elizabeth Eaton
- Former Presiding Bishop of the Evangelical Lutheran Church in America
- Installed: October 5, 2013
- Term ended: October 1, 2025
- Predecessor: Mark Hanson
- Successor: Yehiel Curry
- Other post: Bishop of Northeastern Ohio Synod

Orders
- Ordination: 1981

Personal details
- Born: April 2, 1955 (age 71) Cleveland, Ohio, US
- Denomination: Lutheran
- Spouse: Conrad Selnick
- Children: Rebeckah, Susannah
- Education: Harvard Divinity School; College of Wooster

Elizabeth Amy Eaton (born April 2, 1955) is an American bishop who served as the fourth Presiding Bishop, and the first female Presiding Bishop, of the Evangelical Lutheran Church in America (ELCA) from 2013 to 2025. She was first elected to this post in 2013 and was re-elected for a second term in 2019, serving until 2025. She was succeeded by Bishop Yehiel Curry of the Metropolitan Chicago Synod to be presiding bishop of the ELCA. Prior to becoming presiding bishop, she served as bishop of the Northeastern Ohio Synod.

== Early life and education ==
Eaton was raised in West Park, in Cleveland, Ohio. She attended the College of Wooster where she earned a Bachelor of Arts in music education in 1977. Drawn to the ministry, she attended Harvard Divinity School where she earned a Master of Divinity degree in 1980.

== Ministry ==
Eaton was ordained in 1981, and served as the associate pastor at All Saints Lutheran Church in Worthington, Ohio, from 1981 to 1990. In 1984, she served as a delegate to the Lutheran World Federation assembly in Budapest, Hungary. In 1990, Eaton was appointed to a one-year term as interim pastor at Good Hope Lutheran Church in Youngstown, Ohio. She then moved to Ashtabula, Ohio in 1991, where she became the pastor at Messiah Lutheran Church. She served there for fifteen years.

Eaton was elected to the national ELCA Church Council in 2005, and in 2006, she was elected bishop of the Northeastern Ohio Synod. Eaton became the first woman to serve as bishop in the synod when she was installed on February 7, 2007, at St. Paul's Episcopal Church in Akron, Ohio. She succeeded Marcus J. Miller, who resigned in 2006 to become the president of the Lutheran Theological Southern Seminary in South Carolina.

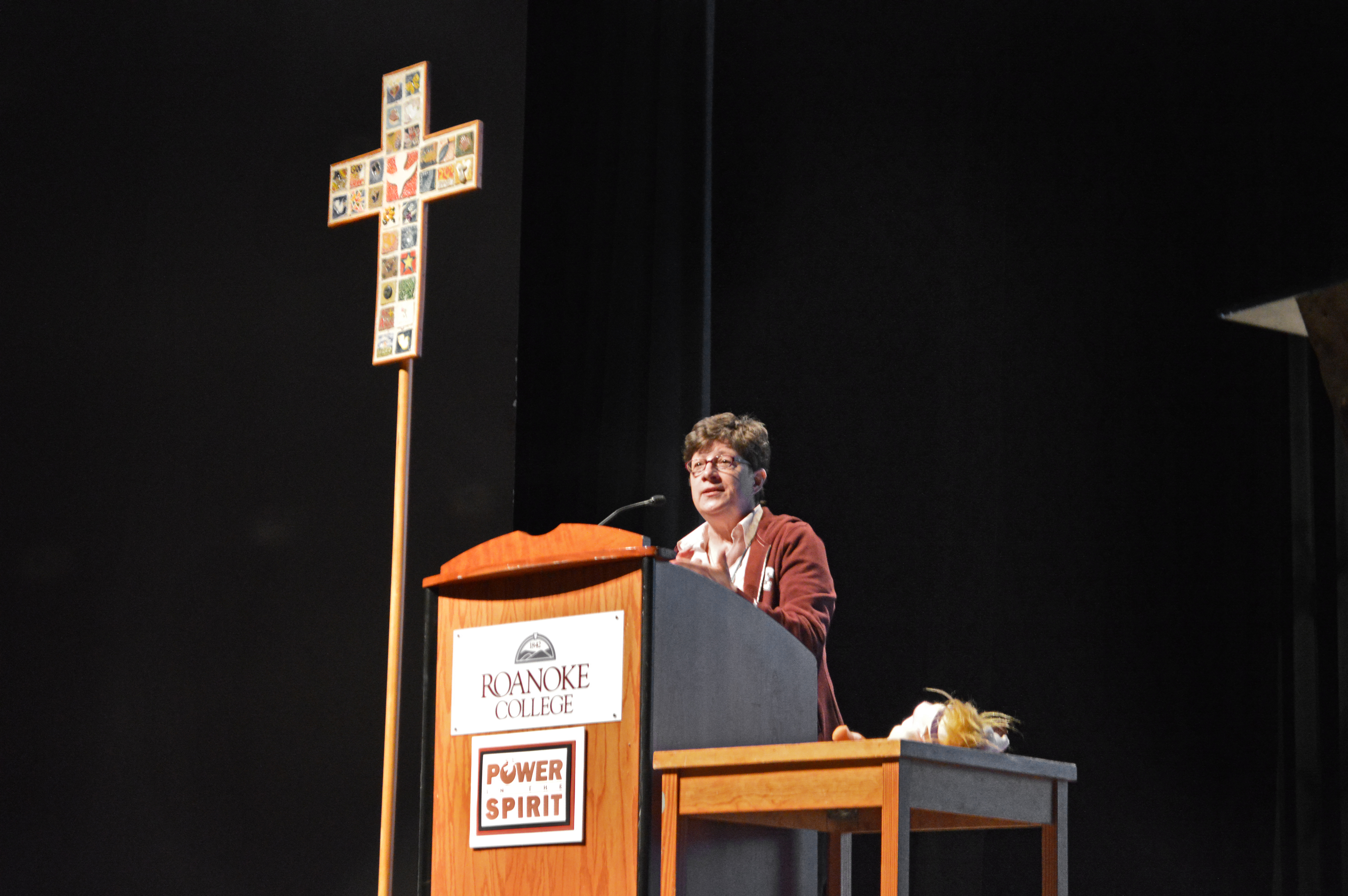
Bishop Elizabeth Eaton speaks at the Power in the Spirit conference on Roanoke's campus.

=== Election as Presiding Bishop ===
Eaton was elected Presiding Bishop of the ELCA on Wednesday, August 14, 2013, on the fifth ballot. She received 600 votes by the Churchwide Assembly, and the incumbent Presiding Bishop Mark Hanson received 287 votes. She was installed as presiding bishop of the ELCA on October 5, 2013, at Rockefeller Chapel in Hyde Park (Chicago, Illinois). Chicago is also the location of the ELCA headquarters. Her first six-year term as presiding bishop of the ELCA began November 1, 2013. In 2019, she was reelected to a second term as Presiding Bishop at the ELCA Churchwide Assembly.

In 2016, Eaton was awarded an honorary Doctor of Humane Letters degree by Luther College.

== Personal life ==
Eaton is married to T. Conrad Selnick, a priest of the Episcopal Church, who is vice president of the Bexley Seabury Seminary Federation in Chicago, and together they have two adult daughters, Rebeckah and Susannah.

== See also ==
- List of ELCA synods
- Timeline of women's ordination

Titles in Lutheranism
Preceded by Mark Hanson	Presiding Bishop of the Evangelical Lutheran Church in America; 2013–2025	Succeeded by Yehiel Curry
