= Eliza Griswold =

American writer

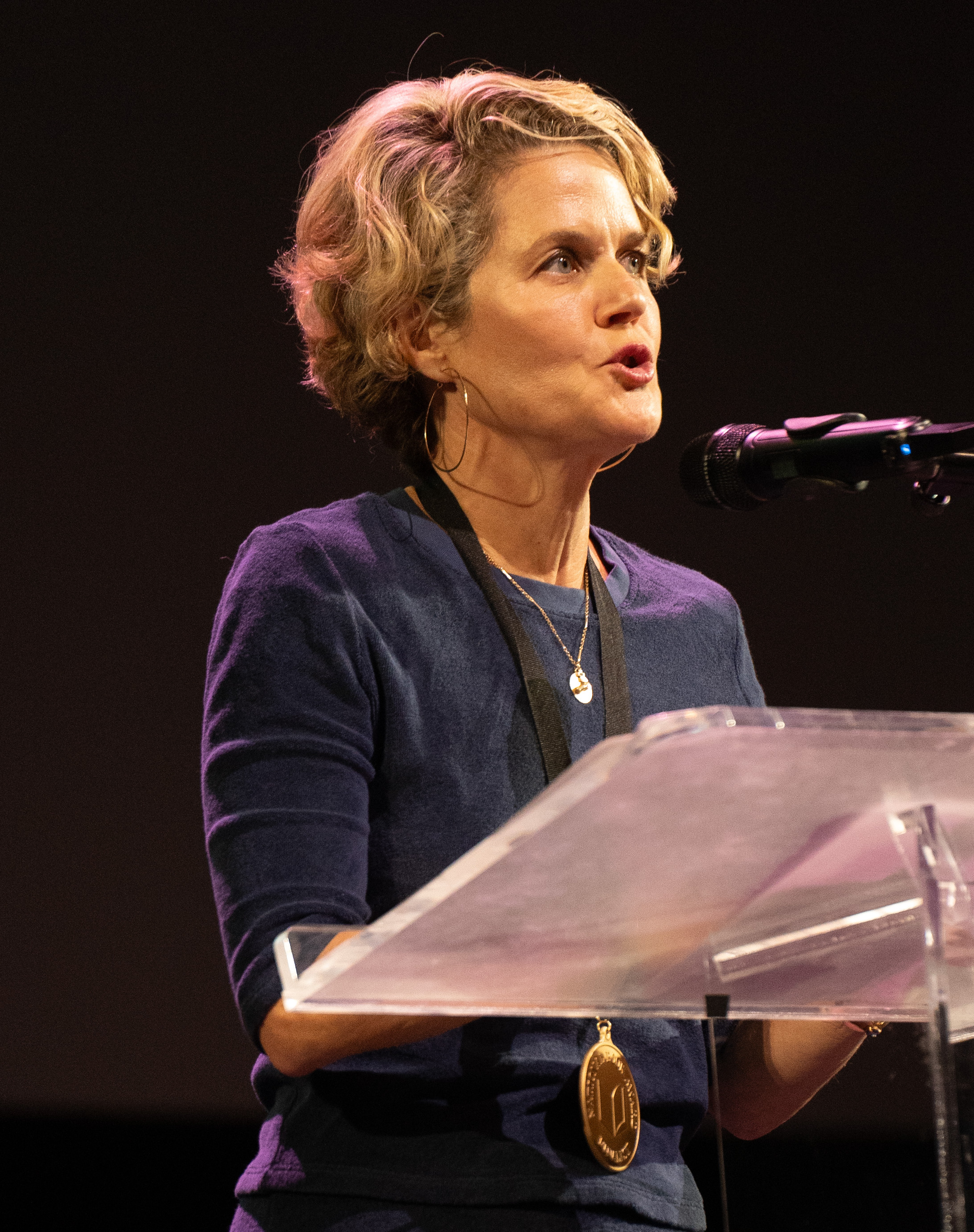
- Griswold at the 2024 National Book Awards finalist reading
- Born: February 9, 1973 (age 53)
- Education: Princeton University
- Occupations: Journalist, Poet
- Father: Frank Griswold

Eliza Griswold (born February 9, 1973) is a Pulitzer Prize–winning American journalist and poet. Griswold is currently the Ferris Professor and Director of the Journalism Program at Princeton University. She is also a contributing writer to The New Yorker and formerly a Distinguished Writer in Residence at New York University. She is the author of Amity and Prosperity: One Family and the Fracturing of America, which was awarded the Pulitzer Prize for general nonfiction and the Ridenhour Book Prize in 2019, and which was a 2018 New York Times Notable Book and a Times Critics' Pick. Griswold was a fellow at the New America Foundation from 2008 to 2010 and won a 2010 Rome Prize from the American Academy of Arts and Letters. She is a former Nieman Fellow and a 2016–17 Berggruen Fellow at Harvard Divinity School, and has been published in The New Yorker, Harper's Magazine, and The New York Times Magazine.

== Professional life ==
Eliza Griswold graduated from Princeton University in 1995 and studied creative writing at Johns Hopkins University. Prior to post-secondary education, she graduated from St. Paul’s School in Concord, New Hampshire.

Griswold has written extensively on the "war on terror". She won the first Robert I. Friedman Prize in Investigative Journalism in 2004, for "In the Hiding Zone", about Pakistan's Waziristan Agency. She worked with later murdered Pakistani journalist Hayatullah Khan, because, as she said, “he followed the story, no matter the personal cost.”

Griswold published Wideawake Field, a book of poetry, on May 17, 2007. A second book, The Tenth Parallel: Dispatches from the Fault Line Between Christianity and Islam, is a travelogue about the regions of the world along the line of latitude where Christianity and Islam clash. In 2011 Griswold was awarded the J. Anthony Lukas Book Prize for The Tenth Parallel. She was also a 2012 Guggenheim Fellow.

In 2011 in The New York Times Magazine, Griswold published an investigative report, "The Fracturing of Pennsylvania", which investigated the environmentally-questionable practices of fracking companies such as Range Resources, based in Texas. In 2015 for The New York Times Magazine, she wrote about the demise of Christianity in the Mideast.

Griswold was a 2014 Ferris Professor at Princeton University and currently teaches at the Arthur L. Carter Journalism Institute at New York University as a Distinguished Writer in Residence.

In 2015, Griswold's translation from the Pashto of I Am the Beggar of the World: Landays from Contemporary Afghanistan won the PEN Award for Poetry in Translation.

Griswold won the 2019 Pulitzer Prize for General Nonfiction for her book Amity and Prosperity: One Family and the Fracturing of America.

In 2020, Griswold published her second book of poetry, If Men, Then, which appeared in The New Yorker and Granta, was profiled by the Poetry Foundation, was listed as New and Noteworthy by The New York Times and was one of Vogue's most anticipated books of 2020.

In 2024, Griswold's next book, A Circle of Hope: Reckoning with Love, Power, and Justice in an American Church was published by Farrar, Straus & Giroux. It was longlisted for the National Book Award for Nonfiction.

== Family ==
Eliza Griswold is the daughter of Phoebe and Frank Griswold, the 25th Presiding Bishop of the Episcopal Church. She is married to journalist and academic Steve Coll. Steve Coll is former dean of the Graduate School of Journalism at Columbia University, which hosts the Pulitzer Prizes and a Pulitzer board member since 2012. She was previously married to Christopher Allen.

== Bibliography ==
=== Books ===
- Griswold, Eliza (1997). A night full of low stars. Johns Hopkins University.
- — (2007). Wideawake field : poems. Farrar, Straus and Giroux.
- The Tenth Parallel: Dispatches from the Fault Line Between Christianity and Islam. Farrar, Straus and Giroux. 17 August 2010. ISBN 978-1-4299-7966-5.
- I Am the Beggar of the World: Landays from Contemporary Afghanistan. Macmillan. 1 April 2014. ISBN 978-0374191870.
- Amity and Prosperity: One Family and the Fracturing of America. Farrar, Straus and Giroux. 2018. ISBN 9780374103118.
- If Men, Then. Farrar, Strous and Giroux. 2020. ISBN 9780374280772
- Circle of Hope: A Reckoning with Love, Power and Justice in an American Church. Farrar, Straus and Giroux. 2024. ISBN 9780374601683.

=== Essays and reporting ===
- Eliza Griswold (January 23, 2005). "The Next Islamist Revolution?". New York Times Magazine.
- Eliza Griswold (2003-05-05). "The Kurds Take a City". The Nation.
- Eliza Griswold (April 14, 2003). "With the Kurds". The Nation.
- Eliza Griswold (December 2010). "In the Land of Sheba: A Pilgrimage to Ethiopia (series)". Slate.
- Eliza Griswold (November 2011). "The Fracturing of Pennsylvania". New York Times Magazine.
- Eliza Griswold (June 13, 2014). "Can General Linder's Special Operations Forces Stop the Next Terrorist Threat?". New York Times Magazine.
- Eliza Griswold (July 22, 2015). "Is This the End of Christianity in the Middle East?" New York Times Magazine
- Eliza Griswold (January 20, 2016). "Why is it So Difficult for Syrian Refugees to Get Into the U.S.?" New York Times Magazine
- — (July 3, 2017). "Undermined : a local activist fights for the future of coal country". The Critics. A Critic at Large. The New Yorker. Vol. 93, no. 19. pp. 48–57.
- Eliza Griswold (March 5, 2018). "The Violent Toll of Hindu Nationalism in India" New Yorker
- Eliza Griswold (February 2, 2020). “Richard Rohr Reorders the Universe” New Yorker
- — (November 18, 2019). "Crises of choice : as rural health care flounders, anti-abortion centers are gaining ground". Letter from Indiana. The New Yorker. Vol. 95, no. 36. pp. 30–35.
- Eliza Griswold (October 19, 2019). “Teaching Democrats to Speak Evangelical” New Yorker
