= I Am the Beggar of the World =

Poetry collection

First edition

I Am the Beggar of the World: Landays from Contemporary Afghanistan is a 2014 collection of over 100 landays written by female Afghans, and translated into English by Eliza Griswold. The book also includes images taken by Seamus Murphy. The collection was generally well received, winning the 2014 PEN Award for Poetry in Translation. Critics praised the window the poems offered into the lives of women in Afghanistan as well as Murphy's photographs and other contextual materials included by Griswold.

== Background and compilation ==
The landay is a style of poetry from Afghanistan. They are generally twenty-two syllables long, with nine in their first line, and thirteen in the second and final. The American poet Eliza Griswold traveled around Afghanistan with Seamus Murphy, a photographer, to collect landays from remote places around the nation. They often traveled in secret. Griswold wrote in an article published by the BBC that her project was what she called "investigative poetry." She had learned of the poetry form after hearing of a young girl that allegedly killed herself after being forbidden to write poetry.

In total, Griswold collected over 100 such poems written by female Afghan poets to create I Am the Beggar of the World. She translated the poems from Pashto into English. Most of her English translations are modified so that the two lines rhyme, which is uncommon. The book also includes about 50 images taken by Murphy.

I Am the Beggar of the World was published in 2014 by Farrar, Straus and Giroux. The landays included within are grouped by their theme. Griswold includes context of where the poems came from or what they were about. The titular landay, for instance, came from a woman living near Jalalabad in a refugee camp whose husband was dying:

In my dream, I am the president.
When I awake, I am the beggar of the world.

== Reception ==
The book won the 2014 PEN Award for Poetry in Translation. Tess Taylor described the book's poetry in NPR as feeling "both anonymous and universal" and commented on the window it offered to the lives of women living in Afghanistan. The book was described as a "rich and graceful collection" by Elizabeth T. Gray Jr. in the Harvard Review. She praised Griswold's decision to make her translations rhyme. John Bradley wrote for Rain Taxi that it "offers much to entrance and disturb". He felt the context of the poems made them more powerful and that the landays offered "remarkable" stories of women in a culture where their voices were often silenced. A review published in Ohio State University's The Journal said that the book "adds a new chapter to the ancient story of human indomitability". A reviewer for The Christian Science Monitor also praised both the writing and photography.

Gray praised Murphy's photography, describing them as "stunning" and noting how they complemented the poems included.
