= H. George Anderson =

American Lutheran bishop (born 1932)

Bishop H. George Anderson
- Presiding Bishop of the Evangelical Lutheran Church in America
- Church: Evangelical Lutheran Church in America
- Installed: October 1995
- Term ended: October 6, 2001
- Predecessor: Herbert W. Chilstrom
- Successor: Mark S. Hanson

Personal details
- Born: H. George Anderson; 10 March 1932 (age 94) Los Angeles, California
- Denomination: Lutheran
- Residence: Decorah, Iowa
- Parents: Reuben and Frances Anderson
- Spouse: Christine
- Children: Erik, Kristi, Lars, Niels
- Education: Yale, University of Pennsylvania, Lutheran Theological Seminary at Philadelphia

H. George Anderson (born March 10, 1932) was the second Presiding Bishop of the Evangelical Lutheran Church in America from October 1995 to October 2001. Prior to his term as Presiding Bishop, he was the president of Luther College in Decorah, Iowa and on the faculty of Lutheran Theological Southern Seminary, serving as president from 1970 to 1982.

== Biography ==
=== Early life and education ===
Anderson was born in Los Angeles, California on March 10, 1932, and adopted by Reuben and Frances Anderson. Anderson, a Phi Beta Kappa graduate from Yale, earned graduate degrees from the University of Pennsylvania and the Lutheran Theological Seminary at Philadelphia, and is known as a translator and author of many works on Lutheran history. At the time of his election as presiding bishop, he was president of Luther College, having served in that capacity from 1982 to 1996. Prior to his tenure at Luther he was on the faculty of Lutheran Theological Southern Seminary, Columbia, South Carolina, and served as its president from 1970 to 1982.

=== Publications ===
As bishop, Anderson wrote a regular column in "The Lutheran" magazine, and completed "A Good Time to Be the Church, A Conversation with Bishop H. George Anderson," Augsburg Books, February 1997. Other works include co-authorship of several volumes of the "Lutherans and Catholics in Dialogue" series, many scholarly essays, book chapters and translations over the course of three decades.

=== Personal ===
Anderson is currently retired and living in Decorah, Iowa.

Titles in Lutheranism
Preceded by Herbert W. Chilstrom	Presiding Bishop of the Evangelical Lutheran Church in America; 1995–2001	Succeeded by Mark S. Hanson
