= Circle of Hope =

2024 book by Eliza Griswold

Circle of Hope: A Reckoning With Love, Power and Justice in an American Church
- Author: Eliza Griswold
- Language: English
- Publisher: Macmillan Publishers
- Publication date: 2024
- Publication place: United States
- Pages: 352
- ISBN: 9780374601683

Circle of Hope: A Reckoning With Love, Power and Justice in an American Church is a 2024 book by journalist Eliza Griswold, published by Macmillan. Griswold embeds herself with the Evangelical Christian congregation Circle of Hope in Philadelphia, Pennsylvania and interviews pastors and church members to document how political disagreements, ideological differences and conflicts about church policy led to fractures amongst congregants and eventually the closure of the church.

The book was a finalist for the 2024 National Book Award for Nonfiction.

== Narrative ==
The Circle of Hope congregation was founded in 1996 by pastors, and husband and wife, Rod and Gwen White. The congregation was part of the socially progressive Jesus Movement (also known as "Jesus Freaks"), which are a branch of evangelicalism known as Anabaptists. The Anabaptist branch is known for its apolitical stance, strong pacifist views and eschewing material wealth in favor of modest living. Church members were known to have melted guns and used them to make garden tools. Members of the congregation were also strongly devoted to service; serving food to the local community, providing support for the local poor or homeless and paying reparations to its black members.

Rod and Gwen eventually transferred leadership of the congregation to their son Ben, and three other pastors; Julie, Rachel and Jonny. After the COVID-19 pandemic in 2020 the church focused more on anti-racist initiatives and became LBGTQ affirming. Eventually, the ideological differences amongst the congregants and pastors grew, amidst growing divides in the United States. These differences led to fractures in the congregation and the eventual closing of the church.

== Reception ==
Writing for the New York Times, political commentator David French stated that the book provided salient commentary of how political divides in the United States can work to undermine progress or to destroy good institutions. French also stated Griswold devoted full chapters to each of the pastors and also large parts of the book to congregants, treating each with "humanity and empathy" rather than sensationalizing the rifts. Writing for Christianity Today, Kate Lucky stated that this is not a book about "hijacked agendas and 'reply alls'", rather it is a book about how divergent ideals can work to undermine a church. Lucky also stated that Griswold was inclusive of the pastors and church members and their views; allowing them to share their stories.
