= Presiding bishop =

Ecclesiastical position in some Christian denominations

A presiding bishop is an ecclesiastical position in some denominations of Christianity which have episcopal polity. The title is typically conferred to a church's highest ranking bishop and often denotes authority over the entire church body. The position of presiding bishop exists within various Lutheran, Anglican, Latter Day Saint, and Pentecostal churches.

== Lutheranism ==
=== Evangelical Lutheran Church in America ===
The presiding bishop of the Evangelical Lutheran Church in America (ELCA) is the chief ecumenical officer of the church, and the leader and caretaker for the bishops of the synods. The presiding bishop chairs the biennial Church-wide Assembly and provides for the preparation of agendas for the assembly, the Church Council and its executive committee, the Conference of Bishops, and the Cabinet of Executives. The presiding bishop of the ELCA is elected to a six-year term, available for re-election and is charged with initiating policy, developing strategy and overseeing administration of the entire church. The presiding bishop also serves as a figurehead and speaks on behalf of the entire church.

The ELCA has had five presiding bishops. Herbert W. Chilstrom, from 1987-1995, H. George Anderson, from 1995-2001, Mark Hanson, from 2001-2013, Elizabeth Eaton, first female bishop from 2013-2025, and Yehiel Curry, beginning his term in 2025.

The ELCA's predecessor denominations, the American Lutheran Church (ALC), Lutheran Church in America (LCA), and Association of Evangelical Lutheran Churches (AELC) were each led by a presiding bishop, having previously used the term "president" until 1980.

=== Evangelical Lutheran Church in Northern Germany ===
The presiding bishop of the Evangelical Lutheran Church in Northern Germany (Nordkirche) is the senior (metropolitan) bishop and principal leader of the Nordkirche, a Landeskirche (member church) of Evangelische Kirche in Deutschland. In German, Nordkirche uses the title Landesbischof (literally: State Bishop). She or he got her or his see in Schwerin. They are the primus inter pares of the three bishops in the dioceses (Sprengel). They chair the Conference of Bishops (Bischofsrat) and the Church Executive Board (Kirchenleitung). The first presiding bishop was Gerhard Ulrich. He was retired in spring of 2019. His successor is Kristina Kühnbaum-Schmidt.

=== Other Lutheran churches ===
The Evangelical Lutheran Church in Canada (ELCIC), a mainline Lutheran body similar to the ELCA, uses the term "national bishop" for a similar position. Most other Lutheran churches in North America, especially the Confessional Lutheran bodies use a congregationalist structure and call their national leaders "president." The Lutheran churches of Sweden, Finland, Estonia, Latvia, and Nigeria all use the term Archbishop.

== Anglicanism ==
=== Anglican Communion ===
In the Anglican Communion (the worldwide family of independent churches following the tradition of the Church of England), several churches' primates are called presiding bishop. Among them are the Anglican Episcopal Church of Brazil, the Anglican Church of South America and the Episcopal Church (United States); the primate of Episcopal Church in Jerusalem and the Middle East is called "president bishop".

==== Episcopal Church in the United States ====
In the Episcopal Church in the United States of America, the presiding bishop is the chief pastor and primate of the national church and its nine ecclesiastical provinces. The presiding bishop is charged with responsibility for leadership in initiating, developing, and articulating policy and strategy, overseeing the administration of the national church staff, and speaking for the church on issues of concern and interest. They are the president of the House of Bishops and is elected by the church's General Convention to serve a nine-year term. The correct clerical style for the presiding bishop is "The Most Reverend".

The role and importance of the office has grown over time. Originally, the presiding bishop was simply the senior diocesan bishop who presided over the House of Bishops. In 1919, the office was transformed into an elected one, and in the 1940s the decision was made that the presiding bishop should resign any other jurisdictions for which they might have pastoral responsibility. In this respect, the office is different from that of many archbishops found in other churches in the Anglican Communion which have diocesan responsibilities in addition to overseeing a national church. In the 1970s, the presiding bishop was given authority to enter dioceses for sacramental and preaching ministry, consulting with bishops, and related purposes. The presiding bishop was given the title of primate in 1982. As of November 2024, Sean W. Rowe holds the position.

The Protestant Episcopal Church in the Confederate States of America, a split from the Episcopal Church which existed from 1861 to 1865, had only one presiding bishop. Stephen Elliott, who also served as the first Bishop of Georgia, served as the church's presiding bishop throughout its existence.

=== Continuing Anglican ===
==== Reformed Episcopal Church ====
Ray R. Sutton is the current presiding bishop. This church claims to continue apostolic succession through George D. Cummins who left the Episcopal Church, USA in the 19th century.

Note: The Reformed Episcopal Church is not in communion with the Anglican Communion.

==== United Episcopal Church of North America ====
The Constitution of the United Episcopal Church of North America refers to the senior bishop as the presiding bishop, but within the denomination he is informally referred to as the Archbishop – a hangover from the 1981/4 version of the UECNA Constitution and Canons. The presiding bishop acts as Chairman of the House of Bishops and the National Council, and as primus inter pares or 'first among equals'. The Constitution and Canons were modified in 1992 (confirmed in 1996), with the title for the senior bishop reverting to 'presiding bishop.' However, the change of title never really caught on, and the 2011 General Convention of the UECNA codified the common custom of referring to the senior bishop as 'Archbishop' by modifying Canon 3 - Of the presiding bishop - to reflect this. However, the formal title remains 'presiding bishop' and is used in formal documents. The UECNA derives its historic episcopate from the Episcopal Church via Albert A. Chambers and the Anglican Catholic Church, and also from the Philippine Independent Catholic Church through that church's now defunct Anglican Rite Jurisdiction of the Americas. Unlike the Episcopal Church, the presiding bishop of the United Episcopal Church may retain his diocese after election, and does not serve a fixed term, but is expected to resign following the election of a successor at the General Convention prior to the incumbent's 72nd birthday. In the event of an unexpected vacancy occurring, the senior bishop by date of consecration having jurisdiction serves as presiding bishop until an election can take place. The present holder of the office is Peter D. Robinson.

== Latter Day Saint movement ==
The presiding bishop is a role in the church hierarchy of several denominations of the Latter Day Saint movement. Each presiding bishop has two counselors; the three together form the presiding bishopric.

The position shares its origin with that of bishop. Edward Partridge was the first man ordained to the office of bishop in the early Church of Christ on February 4, 1831. Partridge became known as the First Bishop and later the "presiding bishop" when subordinate bishops were called in the Nauvoo period (1839–44).

After the 1844 succession crisis, the role of presiding bishop evolved separately in different denominations of the movement.

=== The Church of Jesus Christ of Latter-day Saints ===
In the Church of Jesus Christ of Latter-day Saints, the largest denomination of the Latter Day Saint movement, the presiding bishop is the highest leadership position within the church's Aaronic priesthood. The three members of the presiding bishopric serve as church general authorities and oversee the church's temporal affairs (buildings, properties, commercial corporations, etc.) throughout the world.

Along with the First Presidency and the Quorum of the Twelve Apostles, the presiding bishopric is a part of the Council on the Disposition of the Tithes, which oversees and authorizes the expenditure of all tithing funds. The presiding bishopric is also responsible for overseeing the church's Aaronic priesthood, although most of the work in this area is delegated to the Young Men General Presidency.

Since November 2025, the church's presiding bishop has been W. Christopher Waddell.

=== Community of Christ ===
The presiding bishopric of Community of Christ, the second largest denomination, are the chief financial officers and trustees of the church. As such, they are trustees in trust for all church property, including local congregational facilities. They are responsible for the administration of the temporal affairs of the whole church. They lead the Order of Bishops in providing support and mentoring to the financial officers of congregations and mission centers. The presiding bishopric serves also as the presidency of the Aaronic priesthood and leads the Order of Bishops in providing support, training, and advocacy in empowering the Aaronic Ministers. They direct the stewardship education efforts of the church and lead financial development efforts with major donors. The presiding bishopric is a part of the World Church Leadership Council, along with the First Presidency and Council of Twelve Apostles. They also serve as members of the World Church Finance Board, which proposes budgets to the World Conference for approval.

The current presiding bishop of the church is Ronald D. Harmon Jr., with Willem van Klinken and Carla K. Long as counselors.

Remnant Church of Jesus Christ of Latter Day Saints

In the Remnant Church of Jesus Christ of Latter Day Saints, a man recognized as a "literal descendant of Aaron" (or Kohanim) can, under the direction of the First Presidency, hold the role of presiding bishop alone, without counselors. At this time, the only man to hold the title of presiding bishop under these conditions is W. Kevin Romer.

== Church of God in Christ ==
The current presiding bishop of the Church Of God In Christ is Bishop J. Drew Sheard, pastor of Greater Emmanuel Institutional Church Of God In Christ located in Detroit, Michigan. The presiding bishop is elected every four years by the COGIC General Assembly and Board of Bishops, along with eleven other Bishops who are in charge of executing and overseeing the religious, civil, and economic bylaws and ministries of the denomination, and who work alongside the delegates of the General Assembly and Board of Bishops to provide administration over the denomination. As a result of the 2020 global COVID-19 pandemic, the Quadrennial Election (usually held before the church's Holy Convocation) was postponed until 2021, where Sheard was elected.

== See also ==
- Primate (bishop)
- Ecclesiastical polity
- Episcopal polity
- Supreme Bishop
