= Herbert W. Chilstrom =

American bishop (1931–2020)

Bishop Herbert W. Chilstrom
- Presiding Bishop of the Evangelical Lutheran Church in America
- Church: Evangelical Lutheran Church in America
- Elected: April 1987
- Installed: October 10, 1987
- Term ended: October 1995
- Successor: H. George Anderson

Personal details
- Born: Herbert W. Chilstrom; October 18, 1931 Litchfield, Minnesota
- Died: January 19, 2020 (aged 88) Green Valley, Arizona
- Denomination: Lutheranism
- Residence: Saint Peter, Minnesota
- Spouse: Corinne Hanson
- Education: Augsburg College, Princeton Theological Seminary, New York University

Herbert W. Chilstrom (October 18, 1931 – January 19, 2020) was an American religious leader, who served as the first Presiding Bishop of the Evangelical Lutheran Church in America (ELCA). He was re-elected to a four-year term at the 1991 ELCA Churchwide Assembly in Orlando, Florida. He served as bishop of the Minnesota Synod of the Lutheran Church in America, one of the three church bodies which merged to form the ELCA on Jan. 1, 1988.

== Education and career ==
Chilstrom graduated in 1954 from Augsburg College, Minneapolis, with a bachelor of arts degree in sociology. He went on to receive a bachelor of divinity from Augustana Theological Seminary (later merged with other seminaries to form the Lutheran School of Theology at Chicago) in 1958. In 1966, he graduated from Princeton Theological Seminary with a master of theology. He earned a Doctor of Education from New York University and received honorary doctorates from Northwestern Lutheran Theological Seminary, St. Paul, Minnesota, in 1979 and Gustavus Adolphus College, St. Peter, Minnesota, in 1987.

Chilstrom served as pastor of the Faith Lutheran Church in Pelican Rapids, Minnesota, and Augustana Lutheran Church in Elizabeth, Minnesota. In 1962 he became a professor of religion and academic dean at Luther College, Teaneck, New Jersey. He held that position for eight years before accepting a call to be senior pastor of First Lutheran Church, St. Peter, Minnesota, in 1970. In 1976, Chilstrom became bishop of the Minnesota Synod.

Chilstrom was the first ELCA presiding bishop, elected to his post at the church's constituting convention in April 1987. He was re-elected to a four-year term at the 1991 ELCA Churchwide Assembly in Orlando, Florida. Chilstrom was the church's chief ecumenical officer and represented the ELCA in several national and international organizations. He served as a vice president of the Lutheran World Federation based in Geneva. He headed a committee for the National Council of Churches who explored special relationships between the NCC, Roman Catholics and evangelicals.

== Personal ==
He was born in Litchfield, Minnesota on October 18, 1931. He was married to Corinne Hanson, a retired pastor. He died at his home in Green Valley, Arizona on January 19, 2020.

== Publications ==
With Lowell O. Erdahl, he is the author of Sexual Fulfillment: For Single and Married, Straight and Gay, Young and Old. His other works include the book Hebrews -- A New and Better Way. He has been a contributor to Faith and Ferment, Augsburg Sermons, and Lutheran Book of Worship Occasional Service Book.

Titles in Lutheranism
Preceded by Office created	Presiding Bishop of the Evangelical Lutheran Church in America; 1987–1995	Succeeded by H. George Anderson
