= Yehiel Curry =

American Lutheran bishop

The Reverend Yehiel Curry
- Presiding Bishop of the Evangelical Lutheran Church in America
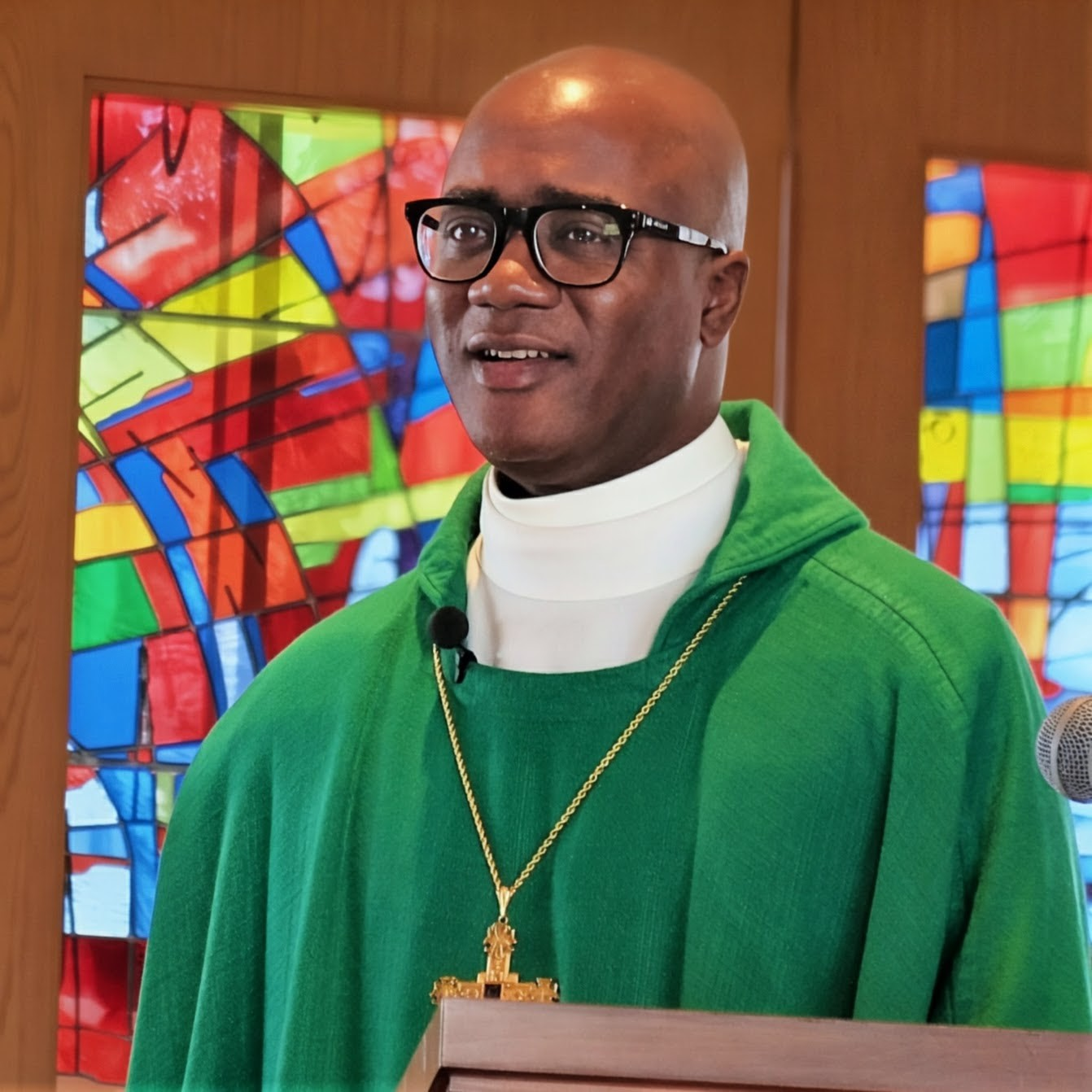
- Church: Evangelical Lutheran Church in America
- Installed: October 1, 2025
- Predecessor: Elizabeth Eaton
- Other post: Bishop of the Metropolitan Chicago Synod

Orders
- Ordination: 2010

Personal details
- Born: July 26, 1972 (age 54)
- Denomination: Lutheran
- Spouse: LaShonda Curry
- Children: 3
- Profession: Bishop, Pastor
- Education: Lutheran School of Theology at Chicago; Lewis University

Yehiel Curry (born July 26, 1972) is an American Mainline Protestant prelate who has served as presiding bishop of the Evangelical Lutheran Church in America (ELCA) since October 2025.

== Education ==
In 1995, Curry graduated from Lewis University, in Romeoville, Illinois, with a Bachelor of Arts. In 2013, some years later, he graduated from the Lutheran School of Theology at Chicago with a Master of Divinity.

== Ministry ==
Before his election as presiding bishop, he served as bishop of the Metropolitan Chicago Synod and prior to that he served as a pastor of Shekinah Chapel Lutheran Church. He was first elected synod bishop in 2019 and was re-elected for a second term in June 2025.

In July 2025, he was elected for a six-year term as Presiding Bishop, beginning on October 1, to succeed Elizabeth Eaton, at the age of 53. He is the first African-American and person of color to be Presiding Bishop, as well as being the ELCA's fifth presiding bishop.

His installation, which ceremonially marked the beginning of his term as presiding bishop, took place on October 4, 2025 at Central Lutheran Church in Minneapolis.

== Personal life ==
Curry was raised in the South Side of Chicago as a Roman Catholic. He worked as a public school teacher and was subsequently a social worker.

He is married to LaShonda Curry, an educator in the Chicago Public Schools, and together they have three adult daughters.

== See also ==
- List of ELCA synods

Titles in Lutheranism
Preceded by Elizabeth Eaton	Presiding Bishop of the Evangelical Lutheran Church in America; 2025-present	Succeeded by incumbent
