= Living Lutheran =

- Editor of Living Lutheran and manager of editorial services: Andrea Kulik
- Frequency: Monthly
- Circulation: 133,400
- Founded: 1831
- Company: Evangelical Lutheran Church in America (Augsburg Fortress)
- Country: United States
- Based in: Chicago
- Language: English
- Website: livinglutheran.org
- ISSN: 0024-743X

Living Lutheran is the primary publication of the Evangelical Lutheran Church in America (ELCA). The editorial offices are at the Lutheran Center at 8765 West Higgins Road in suburban Chicago, Illinois, with the denominational offices. While circulation fulfillment is done by Augsburg Fortress Publishers, the ELCA publishing house located in Minneapolis, Minnesota, all editorial, advertising, marketing and online functions are done in the Chicago offices. Originally historically titled The Lutheran with antecedents going back to the 1831, the magazine changed its name in 2016.

== History and profile ==
The Lutheran was established in 1831 (not to be confused with the German-language Der Lutheraner established by the Lutheran Church–Missouri Synod in 1844). The present publication carries the heritage of almost a half-dozen earlier denominational publications of the several merged churches over the previous two centuries, most especially The Lutheran Standard of the former Joint Synod of Ohio (1818) and the two subsequent American Lutheran Churches of 1930 and 1960, before being reestablished using the name of the predecessor United Lutheran Church in America and Lutheran Church in America magazines as a result of the merger that formed the ELCA in 1988.

The current monthly magazine carries news of the ELCA, its institutions, synods, congregations and members; news of global Lutheran churches; news of other U.S. denominations and faith groups; and inspirational stories and columns. Published 12 times a year, Living Lutheran has a circulation of 133,400. The Lutheran was renamed Living Lutheran in April 2016, and is the largest Lutheran publication in the world and the largest denominational periodical in North America. It is distributed in more than 50 countries and is a member of the Associated Church Press.
