= Mark Hanson =

American bishop (born 1946)

Mark S. Hanson
- Former Presiding Bishop of the Evangelical Lutheran Church in America
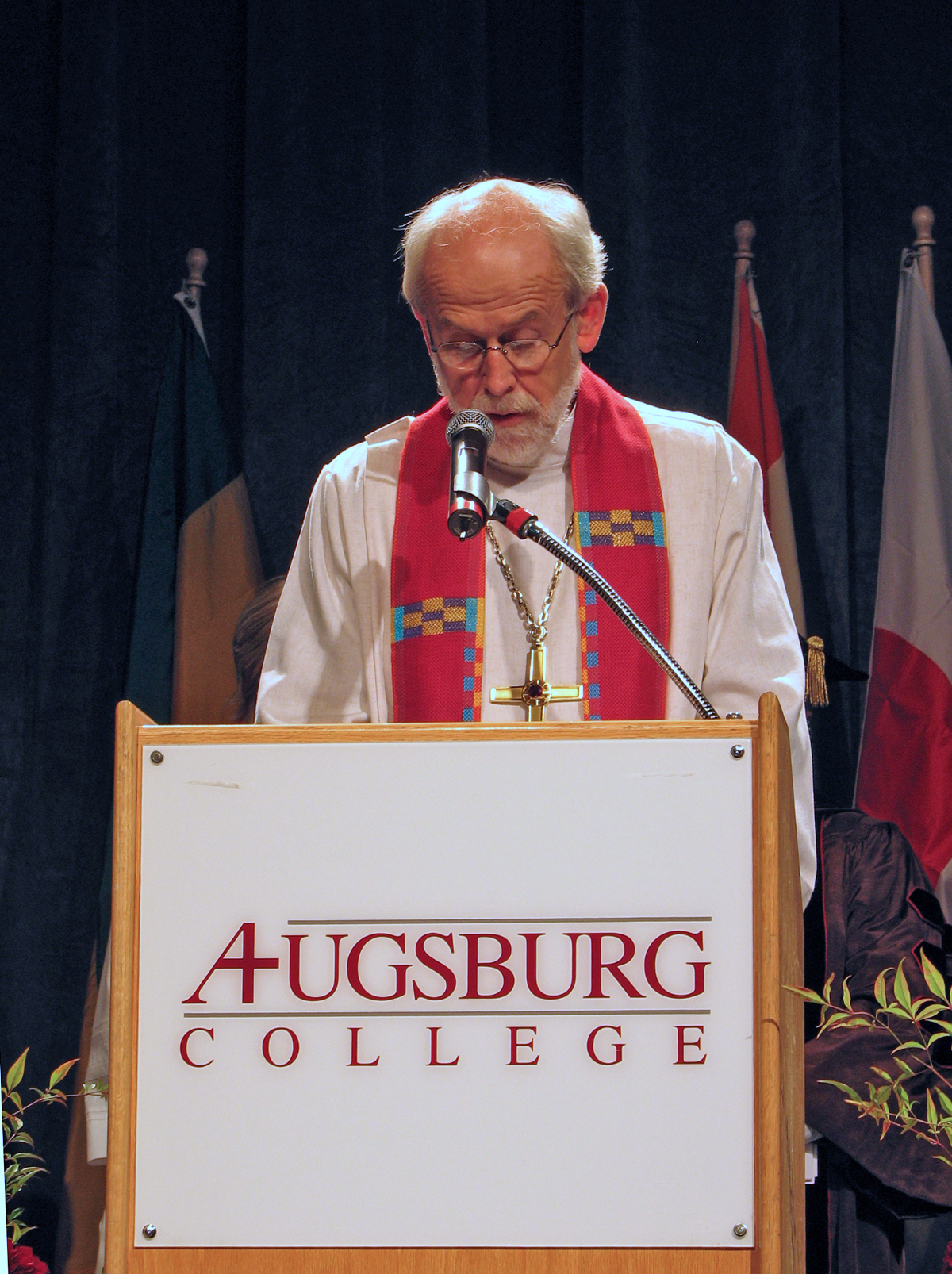
- Hanson speaking at the inauguration of Augsburg University President Paul C. Pribbenow on Oct. 20, 2006.
- Church: Evangelical Lutheran Church in America
- Installed: October 6, 2001
- Term ended: October 31, 2013
- Predecessor: H. George Anderson
- Successor: Elizabeth Eaton

Personal details
- Born: Mark S. Hanson; 2 December 1946 (age 79) Minneapolis, Minnesota
- Denomination: Lutheran: ELCA
- Residence: Chicago, Illinois
- Spouse: Ione Agrimson Hanson
- Children: Aaron, Alyssa, Rachel, Ezra, Isaac and Elizabeth
- Education: Augsburg University; Union Theological Seminary; Luther Seminary; Harvard University Divinity School

Mark S. Hanson (born December 2, 1946) is an American Mainline Protestant bishop who served as the third Presiding Bishop of the Evangelical Lutheran Church in America. Before being elected presiding bishop, he served as bishop of the Saint Paul Area Synod as well as pastor of three Minnesota congregations: Prince of Glory Lutheran Church, Minneapolis; Edina Community Lutheran Church; and University Lutheran Church of Hope in Minneapolis. In addition to serving as Presiding Bishop, Hanson was the 11th President of the Lutheran World Federation.

== Early life and education ==
Mark S. Hanson was born in Minneapolis, Minnesota, on December 2, 1946. He was raised in a Lutheran family in Minnesota. His father was a pastor in the Evangelical Lutheran Church. Hanson graduated from Minnehaha Academy in 1964, and earned a bachelor's degree in sociology from Augsburg University in 1968. He was a Rockefeller Fellow at Union Theological Seminary from 1968 to 1969, where he received a Master of Divinity degree in 1972, and attended Luther Seminary, St. Paul, Minnesota, from 1973 to 1974. He was a Merrill Fellow at Harvard University Divinity School, Cambridge, Massachusetts, in 1979.

== Religious career ==
Following his ordination in 1974, Hanson served as pastor at Prince of Glory Lutheran Church, Minneapolis, Minnesota from 1973 to 1979; Edina Community Lutheran Church, Edina, Minnesota, from 1979 to 1988; and University Lutheran Church of Hope, Minneapolis, from 1988 to 1995. He was elected Bishop of the Saint Paul Area Synod of the Evangelical Lutheran Church in America (ELCA) in 1995, and had been reelected to a second term prior to his election as Presiding Bishop of the ELCA in 2001.

In 2003, Hanson was elected President of the Lutheran World Federation, a role which he served concurrently with his role as ELCA Presiding Bishop. He serves on the executive council on the executive board of the National Council of Churches of Christ in the U.S.A. Hanson is author of Faithful Yet Changing: The Church in Challenging Times (Augsburg Fortress, Minneapolis: 2002). In 2007 Hanson was reelected on the second ballot, making him the longest-serving Presiding Bishop in the ELCA's history.

=== Bishop of the ELCA ===
In 2005, he mourned the death of Pope John Paul II, especially for his contributions to the ecumenical movement. Since being elected presiding bishop, he has received several honorary degrees, including Doctor of Humane Letters from Augsburg University, Augustana College (Illinois), Wittenberg University, and Grand View University, Doctor of Humanities from Capital University, Doctor of Divinity from Lenoir-Rhyne College, Wartburg Theological Seminary, Susquehanna University, Wartburg College, and The Academy of Ecumenical Indian Theology and Church Administration. Mark Hanson was Presiding Bishop of the ELCA from 2001-2013, when Bishop Elizabeth Eaton was elected as the next Presiding Bishop of the ELCA at the 2013 Churchwide Assembly in Pittsburgh, PA.

== Personal life ==
He is married to Ione (Agrimson) Hanson from Hettinger, North Dakota. Before the Hansons moved to Chicago, she was director of social work at Minneapolis and St. Paul Children's Hospitals. The Hansons are the parents of six children.

== Selected works ==
He is the author of Faithful Yet Changing; the Church in Challenging Times, and Faithful and Courageous; Christians in Unsettling Times, both from Augsburg Fortress Publishers.

== Notes ==
Titles in Lutheranism
Preceded by Lowell Erdahl	Bishop of the Saint Paul Area Synod; 1995–2001	Succeeded by Paul Werger
Preceded by H. George Anderson	Presiding Bishop of the Evangelical Lutheran Church in America; 2001–2013	Succeeded by Elizabeth Eaton
Preceded by Christian Krause	President of the Lutheran World Federation; 2003–2010	Succeeded by Munib Younan
