= Lutheran Theological Southern Seminary =

Lutheran seminary in North Carolina, US

Lutheran Theological Southern Seminary of Lenoir-Rhyne University
- Type: Seminary
- Established: 1830; 196 years ago
- Affiliations: Lenoir-Rhyne University
- Religious affiliation: Evangelical Lutheran Church in America
- Dean: Chad Rimmer
- Faculty: 6
- Postgraduates: 69
- Location: Columbia, South Carolina, United States; 34.7402°N 81.3255°W
- Campus: Urban
- Website: www.lr.edu/ltss

Lutheran Theological Southern Seminary (LTSS) is a seminary of the Evangelical Lutheran Church in America (ELCA) and located in Hickory, North Carolina. It offers theological degrees. In 2012, it merged with Lenoir-Rhyne University, also affiliated with the ELCA. Until January 2025, LTSS operated on its pre-merger campus in Columbia, South Carolina.

== History ==
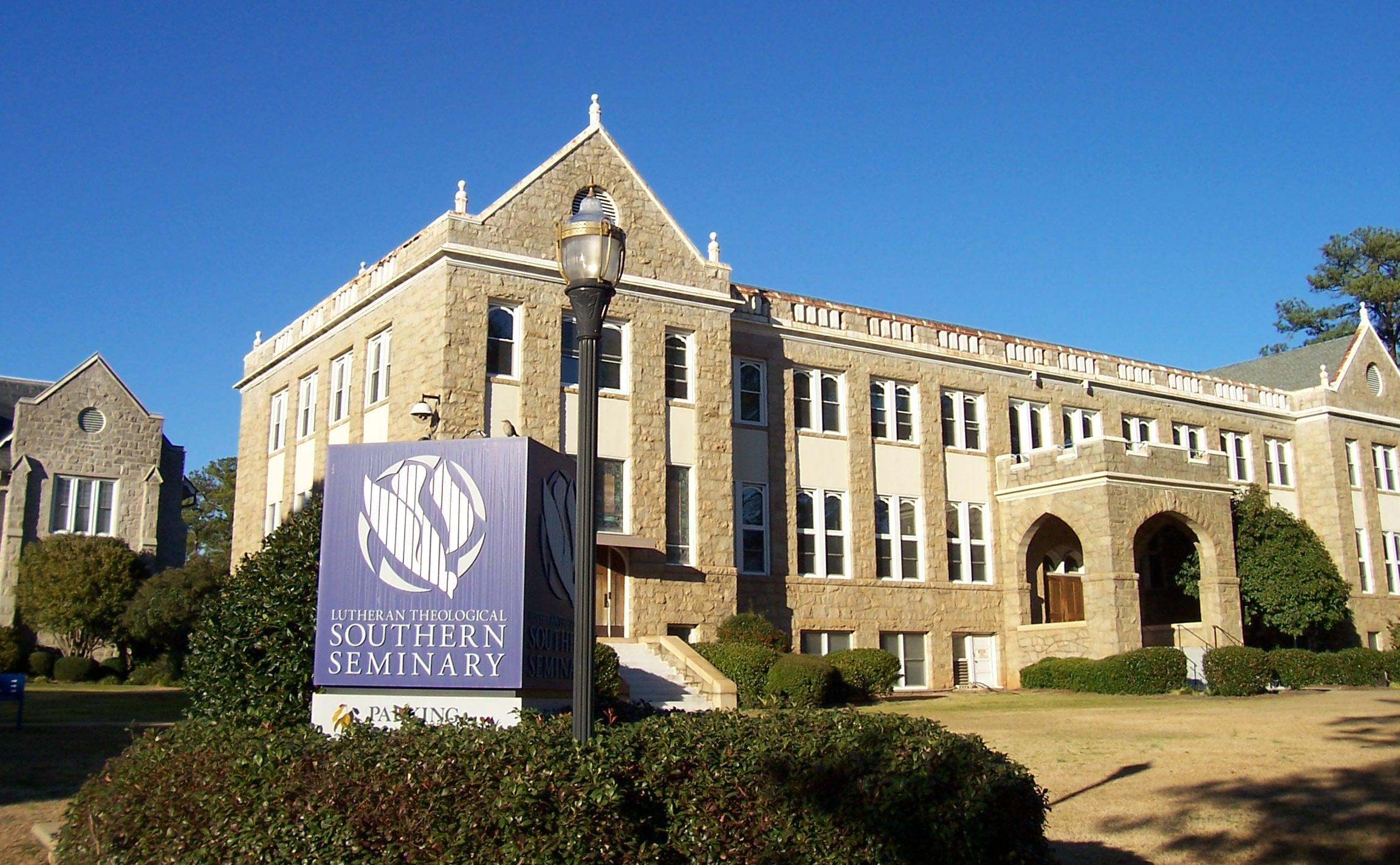
Beam Hall at LTSS

LTSS was founded in 1830 to help serve the needs of educating pastors for Lutheran Churches in the South. John Bachman was the first to call for the formation of a seminary, and LTSS owes much of its existence to his impassioned call for a place to educate future pastors. Originally, the campus was located in Pomaria, South Carolina. The first class graduated in 1834 and consisted of one person, Fredrick F. Harris. Harris was not awarded a degree, but was later ordained and thus is considered to be the first "graduate" of the seminary. The first people to receive degrees were William Berly, Elijah Hawkins, and P.A. Strobel, all of whom graduated in 1836.

In 1834, the school was relocated to Lexington, South Carolina, where it remained until 1856. A surviving building from that period is the Hazelius House. The seminary maintained continuous enrollment until the time of the Civil War, when the entire student body, at this time consisting of exactly three students, left the school to join the Confederate Army. Only one, Jefferson A. Sligh, survived the conflict, and though he never returned to complete his degree, he was eventually ordained by the South Carolina Synod. The seminary was again closed in 1865 due to a lack of students, but was reopened the following year.

In 1868 the seminary was again relocated, this time to Walhalla, South Carolina. The move was temporary as in 1872 the seminary was moved once again to Salem, Virginia, where it would remain until 1884. LTSS was again moved in 1885, this time to Newberry, South Carolina, to the campus of Newberry College, a four-year college sponsored by the South Carolina Synod. In 1903, LTSS was moved to Mt. Pleasant, South Carolina, near Charleston It was moved once again in 1911 to Columbia, South Carolina, where its first building, Beam Hall, was built on the highest point in Columbia, Seminary Ridge.

On March 1, 2024, LTSS announced plans to relocate the seminary program to the campus of Lenoir-Rhyne University in Hickory, North Carolina, in January 2025.

Chad Rimmer is Rector and Dean.

== Academics ==
LTSS awards three degrees: the Master of Divinity (M.Div.), the Master of Arts in Christian Ministry (M.A.C.M.), and the Master of Theological Studies (M.T.S.) The majority of students at LTSS are enrolled in a program of study leading to the M.Div. degree as it is required by the ELCA for ordination as a Minister of Word and Sacrament. Some students enrolled in the M.A.C.M. program are ELCA candidates for ordination as a Minister of Word and Service.

As a part of Lenoir-Rhyne University, LTSS is accredited by the Southern Association of Colleges and Schools (SACS). It is also accredited by the Association of Theological Schools in the United States and Canada (ATS).

== Student body ==
LTSS is a seminary of the Evangelical Lutheran Church in America. The student body is predominantly ELCA, with a significant number of United Methodists and Baptists. LTSS has a long history of being ecumenically committed. In the last two decades, the number of students and faculty from other Christian denominations has grown to nearly half of the student body. The seminary has both Baptist studies and Methodist studies course concentrations available.

== Notable alumni ==
- Katrina Foster, Lutheran bishop
