= Evangelical Lutheran Church in America =

Largest Lutheran denomination in the United States

- Classification: Protestant
- Orientation: Lutheran
- Scripture: Protestant Bible (Note: No particular version is prescribed, but the New Revised Standard Version is used by most congregations)
- Theology: Mainline Lutheran
- Polity: Modified episcopal polity with some powers reserved to the congregation as in congregationalism
- Presiding Bishop: Yehiel Curry
- Full communion: UCC (since 1997); PCUSA (since 1997); RCA (since 1997); TEC (since 1999); Moravians (since 1999); UMC (since 2009); ELCIC (since 2018); ACC (since 2018)
- Associations: Lutheran World Federation; Christian Churches Together; Churches Uniting in Christ; National Council of Churches; World Council of Churches; Churches Beyond Borders
- Region: United States and Caribbean
- Headquarters: Lutheran Center, 8765 W Higgins Rd, Chicago, Illinois, U.S.
- Origin: Constituting Convention on April 30, 1987; 39 years ago, in Columbus, Ohio, operations began January 1, 1988; 38 years ago
- Merger of: Lutheran Church in America; American Lutheran Church; Association of Evangelical Lutheran Churches
- Separations: Lutheran Congregations in Mission for Christ (2001); North American Lutheran Church (2010)
- Congregations: 8,208 (2025)
- Members: 2,588,700 baptized members (2025)
- Missionaries: About 150 fully supported, including nine evangelists
- Official website: www.elca.org

The Evangelical Lutheran Church in America (ELCA) is a Mainline Protestant church headquartered in Chicago, Illinois. The ELCA was officially formed on January 1, 1988, by the merging of three Lutheran church bodies. As of December 31, 2025, it has approximately 2.59 million baptized members in 8,208 congregations.

In 2025, Pew Research estimated that 1.4 percent of the United States adult population, or 3.69 million people, self-identifies with the ELCA; more broadly, 2% of U.S. adults, or 5.2 million people, identified with the ELCA and mainline Lutheranism. It is the seventh-largest Christian denomination by reported membership and the largest Lutheran denomination in the U.S. The next two largest Lutheran denominations are the Lutheran Church – Missouri Synod (LCMS) (with over 1.7 million baptized members) and the Wisconsin Evangelical Lutheran Synod (WELS) (with approximately 340,000 members). There are also many smaller Lutheran church bodies in the U.S., some formed by dissidents to the major 1988 merger. Its members are largely descendants of Scandinavians and Germans who emigrated from countries where Lutheranism was the state religion.

The ELCA belongs to the World Council of Churches, the National Council of Churches of Christ in the USA, and the Lutheran World Federation. It is in full communion with the Episcopal Church, Moravian Church, Presbyterian Church (USA), Reformed Church in America, United Church of Christ, and the United Methodist Church.

== History ==
Various Lutheran church bodies in the United States formed resulting from immigration waves from various countries. For instance, members of the Lutheran Church in America (LCA) (centered in New York City, New York, and Philadelphia, Pennsylvania) were largely descendants of immigrants in the colonial and mid-19th century period. The American Lutheran Church (ALC), with headquarters in Minneapolis, Minnesota, was influenced by descendants of the waves of Scandinavian and German immigration to the Midwest in the late 19th and early 20th centuries. In their countries of origin, especially in Scandinavia and northern Germany, the Lutheran churches were the state churches.

As Lutherans emigrated to America, they initially saw themselves as part of these churches, though they lacked the same organization and formal status in the New World. Over time Lutherans formed church organizations in America. The Association of Evangelical Lutheran Churches (AELC), which withdrew from the LCMS in 1975, comprised many congregations throughout the lower Midwest. Over time, church associations' national or ethnic identification lessened as descendants assimilated into general American society. Members across organizations began to have more in common as areas of the country urbanized and more people made their livings in suburbs and cities, rather than in rural farming areas. The ALC and LCA were already the result of earlier mergers among associated congregations once related to ethnic immigrant groups.

In 1970, a survey by Strommen et al. found that 79% of Lutheran Church in America clergy, 62% of American Lutheran Church clergy, and 58% of Lutheran Church Missouri Synod clergy agreed that "a merger of all Lutheran groups in the United States into one organization is desirable". A group of congregations left the LCMS after 1975 as it became dominated by theological and social conservatives; they formed the Association of Evangelical Lutheran Churches (AELC).

After several years of discussion, the LCA, ALC, and AELC formally agreed in 1982 to unite. Implementing this agreement took longer: the new Evangelical Lutheran Church of America (ELCA) was effective on January 1, 1988, creating the largest Lutheran church body in the U.S. The ALC and LCA had been formed by previous mergers.

=== American Lutheran Church ===
In 1960, the American Lutheran Church formed as a merger of the earlier ALC of 1930, largely members of German heritage; the United Evangelical Lutheran Church (UELC), with members of Danish background; and the Evangelical Lutheran Church (ELC), made up of members of Norwegian background. The Lutheran Free Church (LFC) joined three years later in 1963.

The ALC brought approximately 2.25 million members into the new ELCA. It was the most theologically conservative of the forming bodies, having a heritage of Old Lutheran theology. It had been in fellowship for a decade with the Lutheran Church – Missouri Synod and officially held to biblical inerrancy in its constitution. It seldom enforced that stance by means of heresy trials or other doctrinal discipline. Its geographic center was in the Upper Midwest, especially Minnesota. Its headquarters and publisher (Augsburg Publishing House) were based on South Fifth Street in Minneapolis and one of its several seminaries was in neighboring St. Paul. Its denominational magazine was The Lutheran Standard, published in Minneapolis. Some ALC congregations chose not to join the 1988 merger and instead formed the American Association of Lutheran Churches.

=== Lutheran Church in America ===
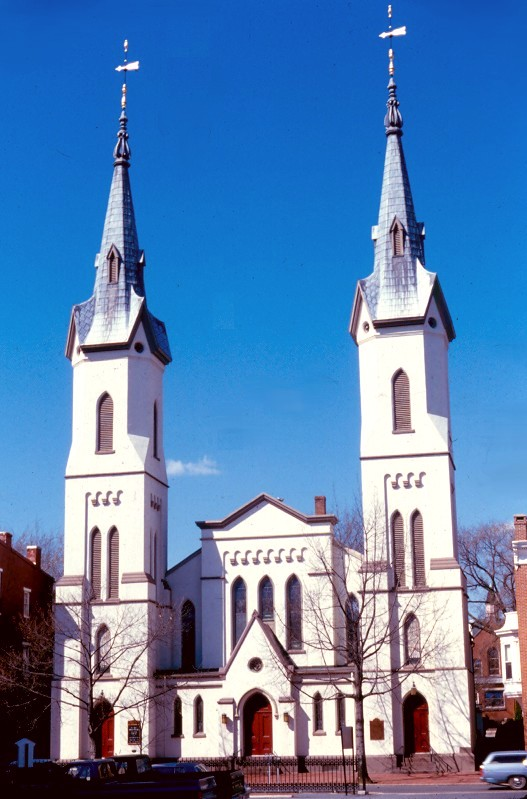
Evangelical Lutheran Church in Frederick, Maryland (1752)

The Lutheran Church in America (LCA) was created in 1962 by a merger among the United Lutheran Church in America, created in 1918 by an earlier merger of three German Lutheran synods in the eastern U.S.; Augustana Evangelical Lutheran Church, of Swedish ethnicity with some dating to the colonial era; the Finnish Evangelical Lutheran Church of America; and American Evangelical Lutheran Church, made up of ethnic Danish families.

The LCA was the slightly larger partner and brought approximately 2.85 million members into the ELCA. Its administrative offices were in the Church House, a former townhouse mansion on Madison Avenue in New York City. Its publishing house, Fortress Press, was on Queen Lane in northwest Philadelphia, and produced the church magazine, The Lutheran. Its demographic focus was on the East Coast, centered on Pennsylvania. It also had large numbers in the Midwest and some presence in the South Atlantic States. There are notable exceptions, but LCA churches tend to emphasize liturgical expression more than the ALC-background churches. Its theological orientation ranged from moderately liberal to neo-orthodox, with tendencies toward conservative Pietism in some rural and small-town congregations. Its theology originated in Neo-Lutheranism.

=== Association of Evangelical Lutheran Churches ===
In 1976, the Association of Evangelical Lutheran Churches (AELC) was formed by 250 congregations that had left the Lutheran Church – Missouri Synod (LCMS) in a schism precipitated by disputes over biblical inerrancy and ecumenism. These were part of the overall fundamentalist–modernist controversy that had been roiling American Protestant churches for several decades. In 1969 the LCMS had elected more conservative leadership under President J. A. O. Preus II, replacing moderate incumbent Oliver Harms. The new leadership opened an investigation at the synod's Concordia Seminary in St. Louis, Missouri, about the faculty's commitment to inerrancy in biblical interpretation. It also opposed ecumenism.

As a result, most of the faculty and student body walked out and established a separate institution initially named "Concordia Seminary-in-Exile" (but usually referred to as "Seminex"). The AELC formed in 1976. It brought approximately 100,000 members into the ELCA. Its ethnic heritage was primarily from German immigrants of the mid-19th century, who came to the U.S. after the revolutions in various principalities. Many were abolitionists and Unionists during the American Civil War. By the 1980s, the AELC theology generally resembled the LCA's.

== Organization ==
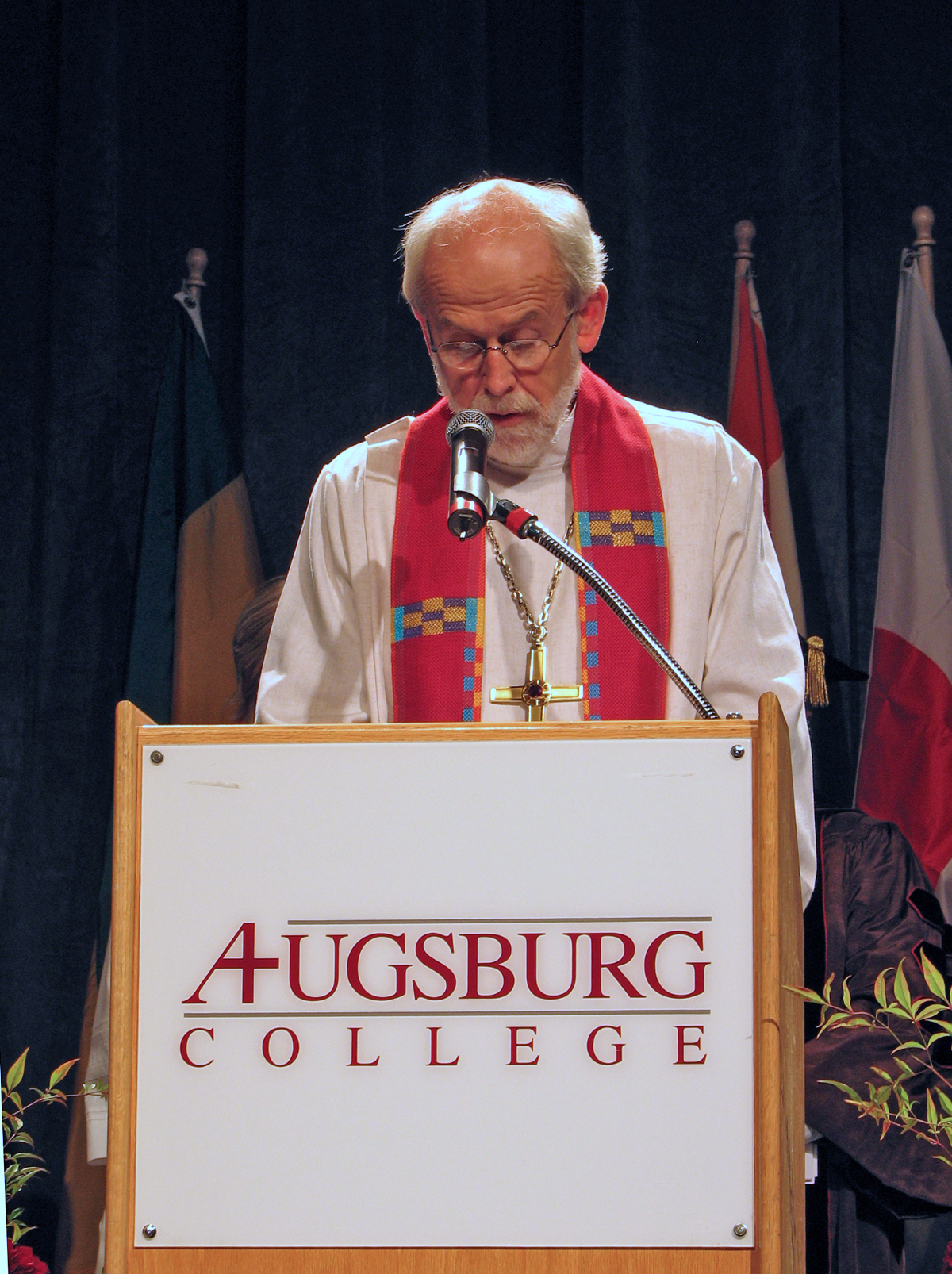
ELCA's then-Presiding Bishop Mark Hanson speaking at the inauguration of a new Augsburg University president in 2006

The ELCA is headed by a presiding bishop, who is elected by the Churchwide Assembly for a six-year term (it was a four-year term until 1995). To date, five people have been elected to the position of presiding bishop of the ELCA. Herbert W. Chilstrom served as the first presiding bishop from 1987 to 1995. He was followed by H. George Anderson (1995–2001), who had previously been the president of Luther College. The third presiding bishop was Mark Hanson, who is the past president of the Lutheran World Federation, headquartered in Geneva, Switzerland. Hanson began his tenure as bishop of the Church in 2001 and was re-elected in August 2007 for a second term. Elizabeth Eaton was elected presiding bishop in August 2013 and took office on November 1, 2013. She was reelected for a second term in 2019. In November 2023, Michael Burk was appointed Presiding Bishop Pro Tempore by the ELCA Church Council following a request by Bishop Eaton to take a 4–6 month leave of absence. Yehiel Curry, bishop of the Metropolitan Chicago Synod, was elected presiding bishop in July 2025 and took office on October 1, 2025. He was installed on October 4, 2025 at Central Lutheran Church in Minneapolis.

In addition, the body of the Church Council is composed of representatives elected for a stated number of years from the various synods. These meet regularly with legislative powers in between sessions of the Churchwide Assemblies.

The Conference of Bishops, which meets at least twice a year, is formed of 66 bishops (the 65 elected synodical bishops, together with the presiding bishop), plus the ELCA church secretary. It is consulted by the presiding bishop and the Church Council for advice on matters of doctrine, faith and order, and ecumenical relations. The ELCA website states that "While primarily advisory, the role of the Conference of Bishops is significant within the life of this church."

A map of the nine ELCA regions. The Slovak Zion Synod falls under Region 7 and the Bahamas and the Caribbean under Region 9.

The ELCA is divided into 65 synods, one of which is non-geographical (the Slovak Zion Synod) and 64 regional synods in the United States and the Caribbean, each headed by a synodical bishop and council; these synods are in turn grouped into nine regions. Within the ELCA the term synod refers to the middle judicatory, which is referred to in some other denominations as "presbyteries", "districts", "conferences" or "dioceses" (the most ancient and traditional term in Christianity). In other Christian churches, the term "synod" is used for a meeting or conference of ministers such as priests or bishops of a diocese, province (region) or nation or, in some Protestant churches, as the term for their annual governing convention. Some Evangelical Lutheran denominations overseas continue to use the ancient church title of "diocese".

Outside the United States, ELCA also has congregations in the Caribbean region (Bahamas which is combined with Florida in one synod; Bermuda, Puerto Rico and the U.S. Virgin Islands); and one congregation in the border city of Windsor, Ontario, a member of the Slovak Zion Synod. Before 1986, some of the congregations that form the Evangelical Lutheran Church in Canada were part of the ELCA's predecessor churches.

Within the church structure are divisions addressing many programs and ministries. Among these are support for global mission, outdoor ministries, campus ministries, social ministries, and education. They include the Lutheran Peace Fellowship, Lutheran Women's Caucus, Lutheran Volunteer Corps, and the Lutheran Youth Organization ELCA Youth Gathering (formerly known in predecessor denominations as the Luther League). They cooperate with an ecumenical inter-Lutheran college/university student organization known as the Lutheran Student Movement-USA founded in 1922 and reorganized in 1969. The denominational publishing house is Augsburg Fortress, and the official denominational magazine is Living Lutheran. ELCA predecessor bodies established twenty-six colleges and universities, which are now affiliated with the ELCA and a large number of associated theological seminaries. Some of these are associated with neighboring universities or theological consortia.

Most local congregations are legally independent non-profit corporations within the state where they are located and own their own property. Governing practice within the congregation ranges from congregational voters' assemblies or annual and special congregational meetings to elder-and-council-led, to congregations where the senior pastor wields great, if informal, power (more common in larger churches).

=== Churchwide Assemblies ===
The Churchwide Assembly consists of elected lay and ordained voting members. The Churchwide Assembly met biennially in odd-numbered years until 2013. Between meetings of the Churchwide Assembly, the ELCA Church Council governs the denomination, along with the advisory Conference of Bishops.

At the Assembly, elections are held for general officers of the Church such as the presiding bishop, vice president and secretary, budgets are adopted, social statements examined and approved, and various other church business enacted, along with reports made and ecumenical visitors acknowledged. A constitutional amendment was passed in 2011 to change the Assembly to one meeting on a triennial basis after 2013. The Assembly was known as the "General Convention" in the ALC and the "Biennial Convention" in the LCA.

- 1987 Columbus, Ohio (ELCA Constituting Convention)
- 1989 Chicago, Illinois
- 1991 Orlando, Florida
- 1993 Kansas City, Missouri
- 1995 Minneapolis, Minnesota
- 1997 Philadelphia, Pennsylvania
- 1999 Denver, Colorado
- 2001 Indianapolis, Indiana
- 2003 Milwaukee, Wisconsin
- 2005 Orlando, Florida
- 2007 Chicago, Illinois
- 2009 Minneapolis, Minnesota
- 2011 Orlando, Florida
- 2013 Pittsburgh, Pennsylvania
- 2016 New Orleans, Louisiana
- 2019 Milwaukee, Wisconsin
- 2022 Columbus, Ohio
- 2025 Phoenix, Arizona

== Beliefs ==
=== Lutheranism ===
Lutheranism is associated with the theology of Martin Luther, with its official confessional writings found in the Book of Concord. The ELCA accepts the unaltered Augsburg Confession (not the variata) as a true witness to the Gospel. The ELCA is less conservative than the Lutheran Church – Missouri Synod (LCMS) and the Wisconsin Evangelical Lutheran Synod (WELS), the second and third largest Lutheran bodies in the United States, respectively. Most ELCA Lutherans are theologically moderate-to-liberal, although there is a sizable conservative minority. Other Lutheran bodies in the U.S. tend to hold more strictly to Confessional Lutheranism.

=== Differences within the ELCA ===
Constituent congregations of the ELCA hold many differences of opinion, and have had disputes over social and doctrinal issues. In part, this is related to the history of having assimilated three different Lutheran church bodies, each with its own factions and divisions, but also to responses to changing social conditions in the United States. Old intra-group conflicts were inherited and new inter-group ones were created. Differences on issues usually reflect theological disputes between various parties.

The ELCA is a very broad denomination. It contains groups of socially and/or theologically conservative or liberal factions with differing emphases on various topics such as liturgical renewal, confessional Lutheranism, charismatic revivalism, moderate to liberal theology, and liberal activism. The socially liberal segment of the ELCA is represented by independent organizations such as ReconcilingWorks, Extraordinary Lutheran Ministries, and the Evangelical and Ecumenical Women's Caucus. What is now known as the Lutheran Coalition For Renewal (Lutheran CORE) is made up ELCA congregations as well as socially conservative congregations that left the ELCA after it (the ELCA) decided to accept openly gay clergy for ordination and calling. Adherents of Evangelical Catholicism practice High Church Lutheranism and include the members of the Society of the Holy Trinity. Those oriented toward Confessional Lutheranism, Evangelicalism, or an admixture of the two include the WordAlone network. Members of the Charismatic Movement include congregations and pastors associated with the Alliance of Renewal Churches and some ethnic congregations. Additionally, there has been a recent growth in Franciscan spirituality in the ELCA through the Order of Lutheran Franciscans.

=== Scripture ===
The ELCA constitution states: "This church accepts the canonical Scriptures of the Old and New Testaments as the inspired Word of God and the authoritative source and norm of its proclamation, faith, and life."

ELCA clergy tend not to subscribe to a doctrine of biblical inerrancy, but see validity in various scholarly methods of analysis to help in understanding the Bible, a process sometimes called Higher Criticism.

=== Sacraments ===
Like other Lutheran church bodies, the ELCA confesses two sacraments: Communion (or the Eucharist) and Holy Baptism (including infant baptism). Guidance on sacramental practices in the ELCA is provided in The Use of the Means of Grace, a statement adopted by the 1997 Churchwide Assembly.

In addition to the two sacraments, ELCA churches also practice acts which are orders. These include confirmation, ordination, anointing the sick, confession and absolution, and marriage.

With respect to the Eucharist or the Lord's Supper, the ELCA holds to the Lutheran doctrine of the sacramental union, that is, that Christ's body and blood is truly present "in, with and under" the bread and wine. All communicants orally receive not only bread and wine, but also the same body and blood of Christ that was given for them on the cross. Members of other denominations sometimes refer to this as a belief in consubstantiation. Lutherans, however, reject the philosophical explanation of consubstantiation, preferring to consider the presence of the Lord's body and blood as mysterious rather than explainable by human philosophy. The Lutheran belief in the holy mystery character of the consecrated bread and wine is more similar to that of Catholic and Eastern Orthodox belief than to the views of other Protestants.

Unlike certain other American Lutheran church bodies, the ELCA practices open communion, permitting all persons baptized in the name of the Trinity with water to receive communion. Some congregations also commune baptized infants, similarly to Eastern Orthodox practice. The ELCA encourages its churches to celebrate the Eucharist at all services, although some churches alternate between non-eucharistic services and those containing the Lord's Supper.

=== Social issues ===
The ELCA's stances on social issues are outlined in its Social Statements and Messages. Social Statements, which are usually, but not always, adopted by a two-thirds majority of a Churchwide Assembly, have been adopted on the following topics:

- Abortion (1991)
- Church in Society (1991)
- Civic Life (2025)
- Death Penalty (1991)
- Economic Life (1999)
- Education (2007)
- Environment (1993)
- Genetics (2011)
- Health and Health Care (2003)
- Human Sexuality (2009)
- Peace (1995)
- Race, Ethnicity & Culture (1993)
- Migrant Crisis (2019)

==== Role of women ====
The ELCA ordains women as pastors, a practice that all three of its predecessor churches adopted in the 1970s (The ALC and LCA in 1970, the AELC in 1976). Some women have become bishops. The first female bishop, April Ulring Larson, was elected in the La Crosse area synod in 1992. In 2013, Elizabeth Eaton became the first woman to be elected presiding bishop of the ELCA. On May 13, 2025, Katrina D. Foster became the first woman and the first openly gay person to serve as bishop of the Metropolitan New York Synod. In 2018, the ELCA elected its first African-American female bishops: Patricia Davenport in the Southeastern Pennsylvania Synod and Viviane Thomas-Breitfeld in the South-Central Synod of Wisconsin.

The most recent ELCA hymnal, Evangelical Lutheran Worship, includes alternate gender-neutral invocations and benedictions in all settings. All of the psalms and many of the hymns and parts of the liturgy have been altered to remove masculine pronouns referring to God. In 2000, the Cooperative Clergy Study Project surveyed 681 ELCA pastors and found that 95 percent of ELCA clergy thought that all clergy positions should be open to women, while 2 percent disagreed.

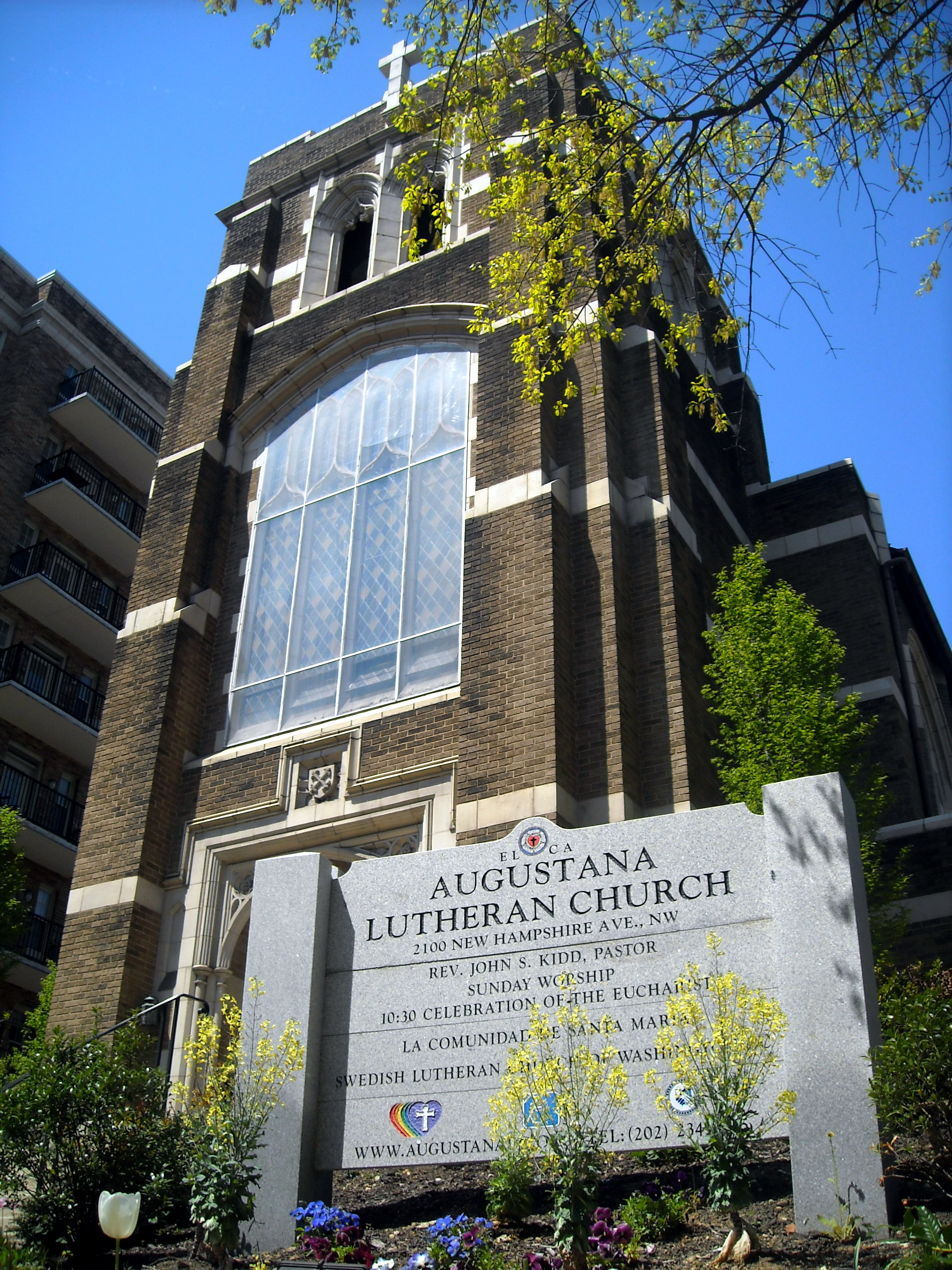
Augustana Lutheran Church in Washington, D.C., is a "Reconciling in Christ" congregation, meaning they welcome all people, regardless of sexual orientation or gender identity.

==== Marriage ====
In 1974, progressive churches founded the Lutherans Concerned for Gay People network (renamed ReconcilingWorks in 2012) for the inclusion of LGBTQ people.

On August 21, 2009, the ELCA's Churchwide Assembly in Minneapolis voted to allow congregations to call and ordain gays and lesbians in committed monogamous relationships to serve as clergy. By a vote of 559 to 451, delegates approved a resolution declaring that the church would find a way for people in "publicly accountable, lifelong, monogamous same-gender relationships" to serve as official ministers. Congregations that do not wish to call these persons to ordained ministry are not required by these policy changes to do so.

In reaction, Lutheran CORE, which opposed the decision, stated that it would "initiate a process that we hope will lead to a reconfiguration of North American Lutheranism." In February 2010, Lutheran CORE announced that it would secede from the ELCA and form a new denomination to be named the North American Lutheran Church (NALC). As of 2008, 37 percent of ELCA pastors were found to support same-sex marriage.

The ELCA, in removing sexual orientation as a bar for candidacy in the professional ministry, joined most of its Lutheran sister churches in Europe, including in Germany, Norway, Sweden, Denmark, Iceland, and Austria. The ELCA is also among a growing number of Christian churches in the United States to make this move, which include the United Church of Christ, the Episcopal Church, the Presbyterian Church (USA), and the United Methodist Church.

In contrast, the board of one of the ELCA's partner churches, the Evangelical Mekane Yesus Fellowship in North America, voted in October 2009 to declare disunity with the ELCA. A press release stated that the board was no longer "in good conscience" "able to commune and partner with ELCA Church that has willfully disobeyed the word of God and regrettably departed from the clear instructions of the Holy Scriptures" that "marriage is only between a man and a woman". This was followed by the general synod of the Ethiopian Evangelical Church Mekane Yesus also breaking links with the ELCA.

In April 2010, the Church Council of the Evangelical Lutheran Church in America adopted revisions to ministry policy documents to bring them in line with the August 2009 vote, as well as adding sections on integrity, substance abuse and addiction. The release noted that the revised ministry policies would be posted on the church's website by the end of April 2010.

Since August 2009, according to the office of the ELCA secretary, over 600 congregations have left the ELCA through January 2011. Income declined, with revenue of $66.7 million in 2010, down from $76.5 million in 2009.

On May 31, 2013, Guy Erwin became the first openly gay man to be chosen bishop in the ELCA when he was elected to a six-year term as bishop of the Southwest California Synod. In 2015, the denomination ordained, officially, the first transgender pastor.

Also in 2015, after the Supreme Court legalized same-sex marriage nationally in the US, the office of the presiding bishop released a letter informing members that each congregation is free to bless same-sex marriages or to choose not to do so.

In 2025, ReconcilingWorks has 1,198 churches, 2 universities and 5 seminaries in the United States and Canada that support blessings of same-sex marriage.

==== Creation and evolution ====
The ELCA has not adopted an official position on creation or evolution, but there is general agreement on interpreting the Bible within its historical contexts and applying critical methods of research. In 2000, the Cooperative Clergy Study Project surveyed 681 ELCA pastors and found that 26 percent of ELCA clergy thought Scientific Creationism should be taught alongside evolution in biology classes, while 57 percent disagreed.

==== Reproductive cloning ====
The ELCA has not yet taken an official position regarding reproductive cloning. However, Task Force on Genetics of the church's "Church in Society" initiative is studying the theological and ethical issues that the world is likely to face in coming years as a result of Genetic Science. The task force has issued a draft report for comment and discussion. The draft statement covers a wide range of topics, from genetic testing to GMOs. A section in this report which has been described by an independent reviewer as "a remarkably nuanced analysis and statement regarding a very complex scientific, social, and religious issue." The task force recommends opposition to reproductive cloning, as almost all religious groups currently do. However, the main theological reasoning is unique. Lewis D. Eigen explains:

The argument they articulate is not the common but weak argument that it would be "offensive to God," "against the will of God" or "man encroaching into God's domain", but they observe that the clone would be denied the dignity of possessing a unique human genotype. This is an extremely interesting argument—that each and every human being has the right to his or her own uniqueness—particularly a unique genotype.

The draft statement further asserts that any clones that might be created should have full acceptance as human beings and access to rites of the church.

==== Abortion ====
The issue of abortion is a matter of contention within the ELCA. In a Social Statement adopted in 1991, the church set out its position on the matter as follows. The ELCA describes itself as "a community supportive of life", and encourages women to explore alternatives to abortion such as adoption. However, the Social Statement asserts that there are certain circumstances under which a decision to end a pregnancy can be "morally responsible". These include cases where the pregnancy "presents a clear threat to the physical life of the woman", situations where "the pregnancy occurs when both parties do not participate willingly in sexual intercourse", and "circumstances of extreme fetal abnormality, which will result in severe suffering and very early death of an infant." Regardless of the reason, the ELCA opposes abortion when "a fetus is developed enough to live outside a uterus with the aid of reasonable and necessary technology." The ELCA opposes "laws that deny access to safe and affordable services for morally justifiable abortions", and "laws that are primarily intended to harass those contemplating or deciding for an abortion." The statement emphasizes the prevention of circumstances leading to abortion, specifically encouraging "appropriate forms of sex education in schools, community pregnancy prevention programs, and parenting preparation classes." In 2000, the Cooperative Clergy Study Project found that one fifth of ELCA clergy favored banning abortion with a constitutional amendment. Lutheran CORE, which represents theologically conservative members of ELCA, together with the North American Lutheran Church, through their Joint Commission an Theology and Doctrine, approved an official anti-abortion stance in the document "The Lord Is with You" – A Word of Counsel to the Church – The Sanctity of Nascent Life", on December 14, 2012.

==== Euthanasia ====
The ELCA official statement on "End of Life Decisions", adopted on November 9, 1992, disapproves euthanasia: "We oppose the legalization of physician-assisted death, which would allow the private killing of one person by another. Public control and regulation of such actions would be extremely difficult, if not impossible. The potential for abuse, especially of people who are most vulnerable, would be substantially increased."

== Ministry ==
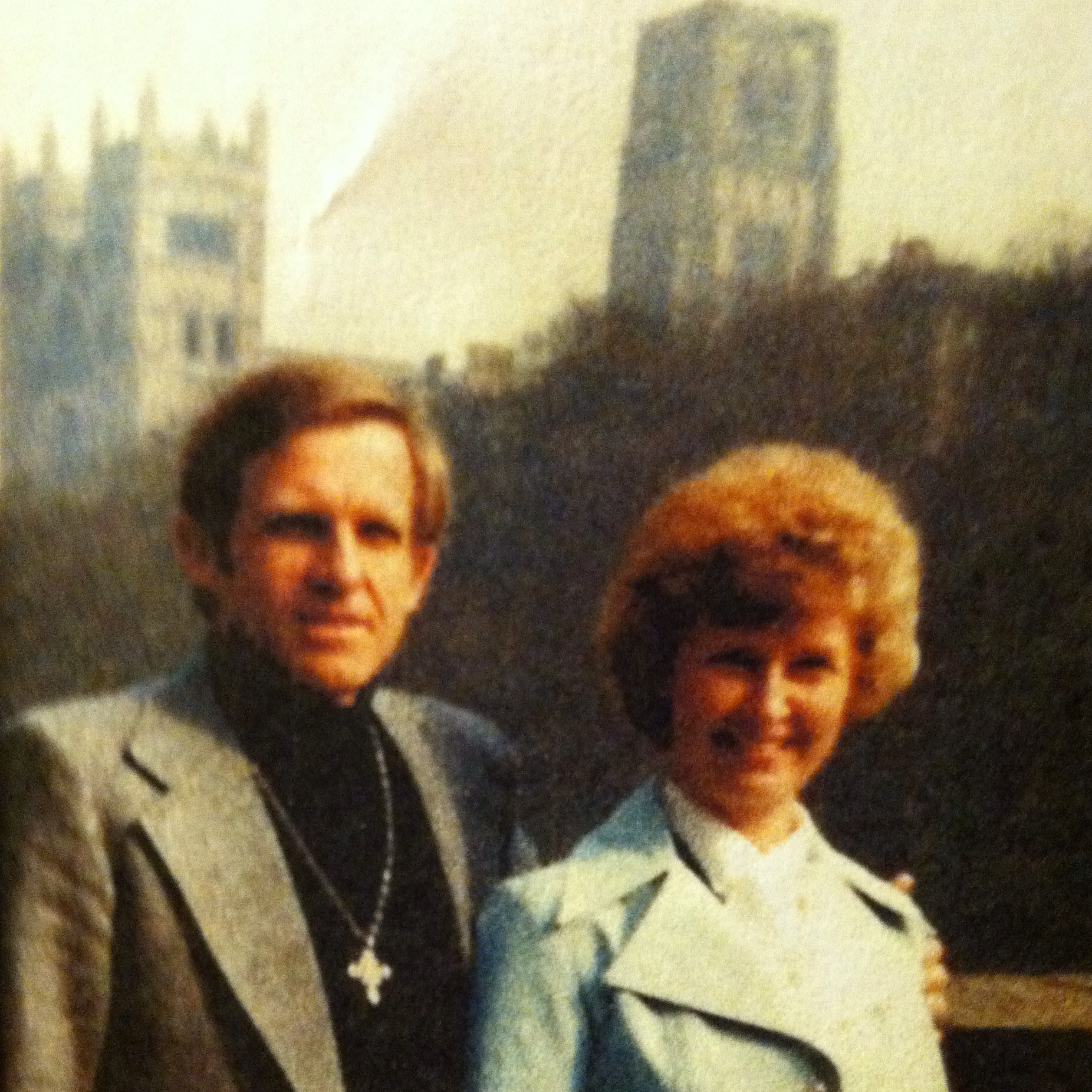
ELCA ministers Richard and Bonnie Jensen, significant figures in the founding of the ELCA

As a Lutheran church body, the ELCA professes belief in the "priesthood of all believers" as reflected in Martin Luther's To the Christian Nobility of the German Nation, that all baptized persons have equal access to God and are all called to use their gifts to serve the body of Christ. Some people are called to "rostered ministry", or vocations of church leadership and service. After formation, theological training, and approval by local synods these people are "set aside, but not above" through ordination.

An extensive "Study of Ministry" was embarked upon immediately after the 1988 merger as it became apparent that there were still discordant viewpoints and influences, especially by the pressure for a renewal of the office of deacon and its different manifestations to a more ancient and traditional view predating the Reformation into the earliest days of Christianity. The church makes a clear distinction between the deacon's "Ministry of Word and Service", and the Pastor's "Ministry of Word and Sacrament".

In the ELCA, ordination refers to the setting apart of pastors in the ministry of word and sacrament and deacons in the ministry of word and service (before 2019, consecration was the term for setting apart deacons). The similar rite for setting apart a bishop is called installation. These rites (for bishops, pastors, and deacons) are formal liturgies, with prayer and the laying-on of hands by the bishop, or by the presiding bishop in the case of the installation of a new bishop. Since 2000, the ELCA has required all installations of new bishops to include the laying-on of hands by not fewer than three bishops who are known to be within the historic line of apostolic succession.

=== Deacons ===
Deacons are called to a "Ministry of Word and Service". The former lay rosters of deaconess, diaconal minister, and associate in ministry were all merged onto one roster, called Deacons, beginning in January 2017.

Deacons serve in many roles in and beyond congregations. At their ordination they may be presented with a towel and basin (in reference to Jesus washing the feet of his disciples) as a sign of their servant ministry, but the rite of ordination (published in January 2017) also allows for other symbols to be presented, reflecting the broad range of diaconal service. The rite states: "Other symbols of the ministry of word and service may be given, which may reflect a particular focus of the deacon's call and vocation, such as a vessel containing oil, a Bible, or the book of worship."

=== Pastors ===
Pastors are called to the "Ministry of Word and Sacrament" and considered a "steward of the mysteries" of the Church (the means of grace). Pastors primarily serve congregations, but some serve in specialized ministries including those of hospital chaplain and military chaplain.

Pastors are ordinarily trained at one of seven ELCA seminaries located throughout the United States, although there are alternative paths for ordination to serve particular communities in which it is difficult to provide trained ministers or to allow rostering of clergy transferred from other denominations. Pastors generally hold a Bachelor of Arts degree or its equivalent, as well as a four-year master of divinity degree. They are required to learn biblical Hebrew and Greek, and spend at least a summer doing clinical pastoral education—an intensive program that gives them time to reflect on their pastoral craft, usually in a hospital setting. They are required to complete a one-year internship of full-time service in pastoral ministry.

=== Bishops ===
A bishop is a pastor called to serve (usually for a six-year term, which may be renewed) as the overseeing minister of a synod, or called to serve as the presiding bishop of the ELCA.

The Called to Common Mission agreement with the Episcopal Church in 2000 means that bishops are now installed according to Apostolic Succession. The fixed term of service as head of a synod has not changed, and there was no requirement in 2000 for existing ELCA bishops to be re-installed within the historic episcopate; instead, the apostolic succession was received as a sign of historic continuity, without denying the traditional Lutheran belief that the Church is truly present where the sacraments of baptism and holy communion are administered, regardless of the historic nature (or otherwise) of the ministry. Before 2000 a pastor had served in the office of bishop and then returned to being known simply as a pastor when service as a bishop had ended. Following the 2000 agreement a former bishop may still return to the work of a local pastor, but is often referred as bishop emeritus, even if not exercising that ministry.

== Worship ==
Published in 2006, Evangelical Lutheran Worship is the main hymnal used in congregations. Some congregations, however, continue to use the older Lutheran Book of Worship published by the Inter-Lutheran Commission on Worship in 1978, and some even continue to use the older Service Book and Hymnal (SBH) of 1958 or its antecedent precedent-setting Common Service of 1888 which laid out a traditional American Lutheran liturgy and later was included in subsequent worship books and hymnals of various churches especially The Common Service Book of 1917, adopted by the old United Lutheran Church in America, a predecessor of the LCA to 1962, and The Lutheran Hymnal (TLH-1941) of the LCMS. Many congregations also make use of supplementary resources recently published as well besides those authorized for the LBW by Augsburg-Fortress, Publishers. Many ELCA congregations are classically liturgical churches. Their liturgy is rooted in the Western liturgical tradition, though recent international Lutheran-Orthodox dialog sessions have had some minimal influence on Lutheran liturgy. Because of its use of the Book of Concord of 1580, with the Confessions, documents and beliefs of the Reformers, including the Augsburg Confession of 1530, Luther's Small Catechism of 1529 and the Large Catechism and its retention of many pre-Reformation traditions, such as vestments, feast days and the celebration of the Church Year, the sign of the cross, and the usage of a church-wide liturgy, there are many aspects of the typical ELCA church that are very catholic and traditional in nature. Many Evangelical Lutheran churches use traditional vestments (cassock, surplice, stole for services of the Word or non-Eucharistic liturgies or alb, cincture, stole, chasuble (pastor) or dalmatic (deacon), cope (processions) for Eucharists (Mass, Holy Communion), etc.). On special rare occasions even a bishop's cross/crozier and mitre (bishop's headpiece) have been used to designate the ancient robes and traditions of the Church originating in Roman times of which Luther and his fellow Reformers like Philip Melanchthon considered as "adiaphora" or of permissive use. Since the Second Vatican Council of the 1960s, most major parts of the ELCA's popular liturgies are worded exactly like the English language Mass of 1970 of the Roman Catholic Church. Many ELCA congregations use informal styles of worship or a blend of traditional and contemporary liturgical forms.

Springing from its revered heritage in the Lutheran chorale, the musical life of ELCA congregations is just as diverse as its worship. Johann Sebastian Bach, the most famous Lutheran composer and African songs are part of the heritage and breadth of Evangelical Lutheran church music. The musical portion of the Lutheran liturgy includes metrical psalter, metrical responses and hymns. Evangelical Lutheran Worship has ten settings of Holy Communion, for example. They range from plainsong chant, to Gospel, to Latin-style music. Congregations worship in many languages, many of which are represented in Evangelical Lutheran Worship. Other books used in ELCA churches include the Lutheran Book of Worship (1978), and its supplements: With One Voice, This Far by Faith, and for Latino/Hispanic congregations: Libro de Liturgia y Cántico.

== Ecumenical relations ==
The ELCA is a member of the National Council of Churches, the World Council of Churches, and Christian Churches Together and is a "partner in mission and dialog" with the Churches Uniting in Christ (formerly the Consultation on Church Union) formed in 1960.

=== Full communion ===
The Church maintains full communion relationships with other member churches of the Lutheran World Federation (which is a communion of 140 autonomous national/regional Lutheran church bodies in 78 countries around the world, representing nearly 66 million Christians) which was reorganized in 1948 from the earlier Lutheran World Convention of 1923. The ELCA has additionally full communion with the Episcopal Church, in which several congregations are jointly affiliated and hold mixed services. Also the ELCA has since established official full communion relationships with other Christian denominations such as the Moravian Church in America (with the exception of the Alaska Province), the Presbyterian Church (USA), the Reformed Church in America, the United Church of Christ, the Episcopal Church, and The United Methodist Church.

In 2013, the Ethiopian Evangelical Church Mekane Yesus severed ties, including communion and pulpit fellowship, with the ELCA over the issue of practices and teachings connected with homosexuality.

=== Roman Catholic Church ===
On October 31, 1999, in Augsburg, Germany, the Lutheran World Federation – of which the ELCA is a member – signed the Joint Declaration on the Doctrine of Justification with the Roman Catholic Church. The statement is an attempt to reconcile a historical theological divide between the two communions. The Declaration also states that the mutual condemnations between 16th century Lutherans and the Roman Catholic Church no longer apply to those that have signed onto the document. This was part of a series of "Lutheran-Roman Catholic Dialogues" have been taking place on an official basis every few years with statements and booklets on various theological topics published since 1966.

=== Lutheran Church – Missouri Synod ===
The differences between the Evangelical Lutheran Church in America (ELCA) and the Lutheran Church – Missouri Synod (LCMS) arise from theological, historical, and cultural factors. The LCMS was briefly in fellowship with the former American Lutheran Church, one of the ELCA predecessor bodies from 1969 to the early 1980s. Although the denominations have limited cooperation through Lutheran World Relief and some university/college student ministries and military chaplaincy, they are not officially in communion with each other.

When the first Lutheran immigrants came to North America, they started church bodies that reflected, to some degree, the churches they left behind in Europe. Many maintained until the early 20th century their immigrant languages. They sought pastors from the "old country" until patterns for the education of clergy could be developed in North America. Eventually, seminaries and church colleges were established in many places to prepare pastors to serve congregations.

The earliest predecessor synod of the Evangelical Lutheran Church in America was constituted on August 25, 1748, in Philadelphia under the influence of Henry Muhlenberg, known as the "Patriarch of American Lutheranism". It was known as the Ministerium of Pennsylvania and Adjacent States. The earliest nationwide "synod" or "union of synods" was established in 1820 as the General Synod, followed later by the General Council. The ELCA was created in 1988 by the merging of the 2.85-million-member Lutheran Church in America (1962), 2.25-million-member The American Lutheran Church (1960), and the 100,000-member Association of Evangelical Lutheran Churches (1978). Previously, the ALC and LCA in the early 1960s came into being as a result of two mergers of eight smaller ethnically based Lutheran bodies composed of German, Norwegian, Danish, Finnish, Swedish, Slovak, Dutch, and others organized over 150 years. Some of these smaller ethnically based bodies previously had ecumenical arrangements involving the Missouri Synod.

The LCMS was established in 1847 by German immigrants fleeing the forced Prussian Union between Lutherans and Reformed church members in European Germany, who later settled in Perry County, Missouri. It grew through immigration, offspring, and church mergers while participating in some, but not all of the dialogues, controversies, and compromises which affected the various predecessors of the ELCA during the 19th and 20th centuries. In the mid-1970s the Seminex controversy at their Concordia Seminary in St. Louis over use of historical-critical biblical study led to the formation of the Association of Evangelical Lutheran Churches, later one of the predecessor bodies of the ELCA. The LCMS is the second largest Lutheran church body in North America with 1.8 million baptized members.

The ELCA tends to be more involved in ecumenical endeavors than the LCMS, which prohibits its clergy from worshiping in ecumenical gatherings. The ELCA is a member of the Lutheran World Federation, World Council of Churches and the National Council of Churches of Christ, USA. The LCMS rejects these as being unionist.

Both the LCMS and the ELCA have policies relating to clergy sexual misconduct. Perry C. Francis, a former ELCA pastor turned professor, along with psychology professor Tracy D. Baldo, published the results of their 1994 study of clergy sexual misconduct in the journal Pastoral Psychology. Out of 270 ELCA and 117 LCMS clergy surveyed, 13.7 percent of ELCA clergy and 4.3 percent of LCMS clergy admitted to sexual misconduct with another person since they began their ministry.

Comparison to LCMS in ELCA's point of view according to the 1999 book Honoring Our Neighbor's Faith These conclusions are not agreed upon by the WELS or LCMS.

Number	LCMS	ELCA
1	Believe in triune God	Same
2	Accept Lutheran Confessions as true teachings of biblical faith	Same
3	Believe that God comes to us through the Word and the sacraments	Same
4	Teach justification by grace through faith	Same
5	Believe that the Bible should not be subject to higher critical methods	Many within the ELCA believe that the Bible can speak effectively through the use of higher critical study.
6	Believe that the Bible restricts women from certain church positions including ordained ministry	Believes the Bible permits, even encourages, full participation by women in ordained ministry
7	High degree of doctrinal agreement necessary before fellowship is possible	Agreement on a more basic level is sufficient for fellowship.

== Demographics ==
=== Members ===
The table below presents demographic data for two different years of the Pew Research Center U.S. Religious Landscape Survey, 2007 and 2014. It is divided into several demographic categories like age, gender, marital status, etc. The categories have percentages out of 100 for 2007 and 2014, along with a column indicating the percent change (±).

Demographic		2007 (%)	2014 (%)	± (%)
Age	18–29	8	12	▲ +4
Age	30–49	36	27	▼ −9
Age	50–64	29	30	▲ +1
Age	65+	27	31	▲ +4
Gender	Male	44	44	no change
Gender	Female	56	56	no change
Marital status	Never married	11	16	▲ +5
Marital status	Married	63	62	▼ −1
Marital status	Cohabitation	3	4	▲ +1
Marital status	Divorced or separated	10	9	▼ −1
Marital status	Widowed	13	9	▼ −4
Parent of a child under 18	Yes	30	24	▼ −6
Parent of a child under 18	No	70	76	▲ +6
Race and ethnicity	White alone	97	96	▼ −1
Race and ethnicity	Black alone	1	2	▲ +1
Race and ethnicity	Asian alone	1	1	no change
Race and ethnicity	Other race alone	1	1	no change
Race and ethnicity	Hispanic and Latino	1	1	no change
Immigrant status	Immigrant	3	4	▲ +1
Immigrant status	Second gen.	6	8	▲ +2
Immigrant status	Third gen. or higher	90	89	▼ −1
Region	Northeast	19	—N/a	—N/a
Region	Midwest	51	—N/a	—N/a
Region	South	16	—N/a	—N/a
Region	West	14	—N/a	—N/a
Highest educational attainment	Less than high school	6	31	▼ −13
Highest educational attainment	High school	38	31	▼ −13
Highest educational attainment	Some college	26	33	▲ +7
Highest educational attainment	Bachelor's degree	19	21	▲ +2
Highest educational attainment	Post-graduate	11	15	▲ +4
Household income	Less than $30,000	24	19	▼ −5
Household income	$30,000–49,999	24	22	▼ −2
Household income	$50,000–74,999	35	32	▼ −3
Household income	$100,000 or more	17	26	▲ +9

=== Beliefs, practices, and views ===
The following table compares beliefs, practices, or views of members of ELCA across two years, 2007 and 2014. Each row represents a specific belief, practice, or view. Columns show the percentages for each year and the change between them. Each entry is broken down into different responses. For example, in the "Do you believe in God or a universal spirit?" row, responses are categorized as "Yes, absolutely certain", "Yes, fairly certain", etc. The percentage of respondents who chose each response for each year is displayed, along with the change in percent from 2007 to 2014.

Belief, practice, or view		2007 (%)	2014 (%)	± (%)
Do you believe in God or a universal spirit?	Yes, absolutely certain	77	67	▼ −10
Do you believe in God or a universal spirit?	Yes, fairly certain	19	28	▲ +9
Do you believe in God or a universal spirit?	Yes, not too or at all certain	2	3	▲ +1
Do you believe in God or a universal spirit?	No, do not believe	<1	1	no change
Do you believe in God or a universal spirit?	Don't know, refused, or other	1	1	no change
Importance of religion	Very important	62	58	▼ −4
Importance of religion	Somewhat important	32	34	▲ +2
Importance of religion	Not too important	4	7	▲ +3
Importance of religion	Not at all important	1	1	no change
Importance of religion	Don't know	<1	<1	no change
Attendance at religious services	Weekly	46	35	▼ −11
Attendance at religious services	Monthly/few times a year	43	50	▲ +7
Attendance at religious services	Seldom or never	10	14	▲ +4
Attendance at religious services	Don't know	<1	<1	no change
Belief in Heaven	Believe	83	85	▲ +2
Belief in Heaven	Don't believe	8	8	no change
Belief in Heaven	Other or not sure	10	7	▼ −3
Belief in Hell	Believe	62	59	▼ −3
Belief in Hell	Don't believe	24	30	▲ +6
Belief in Hell	Other or not sure	14	11	▼ −3
Interpreting the Bible	Word of God to be taken literally word for word	23	20	▼ −3
Interpreting the Bible	Word of God, but not literally true word for word	49	44	▼ −5
Interpreting the Bible	Not the word of God	20	29	▲ +9
Interpreting the Bible	Don't know or other	9	8	▼ −1
Abortion	Should be legal in all/most cases	61	65	▲ +4
Abortion	Should be illegal in all/most cases	33	32	▼ −1
Abortion	Don't know	7	2	▼ −5
Homosexuality	Should be accepted	56	73	▲ +17
Homosexuality	Should be discouraged:	33	22	▼ −11
Homosexuality	Neither/other	6	2	▼ −4
Homosexuality	Don't know	5	2	▼ −3

== Statistics ==
Percent ELCA by state, 2010

Over 500,000 people have left the ELCA since the church's human sexuality decision in 2009. Approximately 700 congregations have voted to withdraw from the ELCA, representing about 7 percent of its 2009 congregational membership. As of December 31, 2025, the ELCA has a baptized membership of 2,588,700 people. In 2025, Pew Research estimated that 1.4 percent of the U.S. adult population, or roughly 3.7 million adherents, identify with the ELCA. Another 1 percent, or 2.6 million adherents, identify with mainline Lutheranism in general. A number of members of the Evangelical Lutheran Church in America are former Roman Catholics. As of December 31, 2025, the ELCA has 8,208 congregations.

== See also ==
- Wisconsin Evangelical Lutheran Synod § Differences from the Evangelical Lutheran Church in America
- Protestantism in the United States
- Christianity in the United States
- List of ELCA synods
