= Institute of Lutheran Theology =

Seminary in Brookings, South Dakota, US

Coordinates: 44°18′31.9″N 96°47′22.2″W

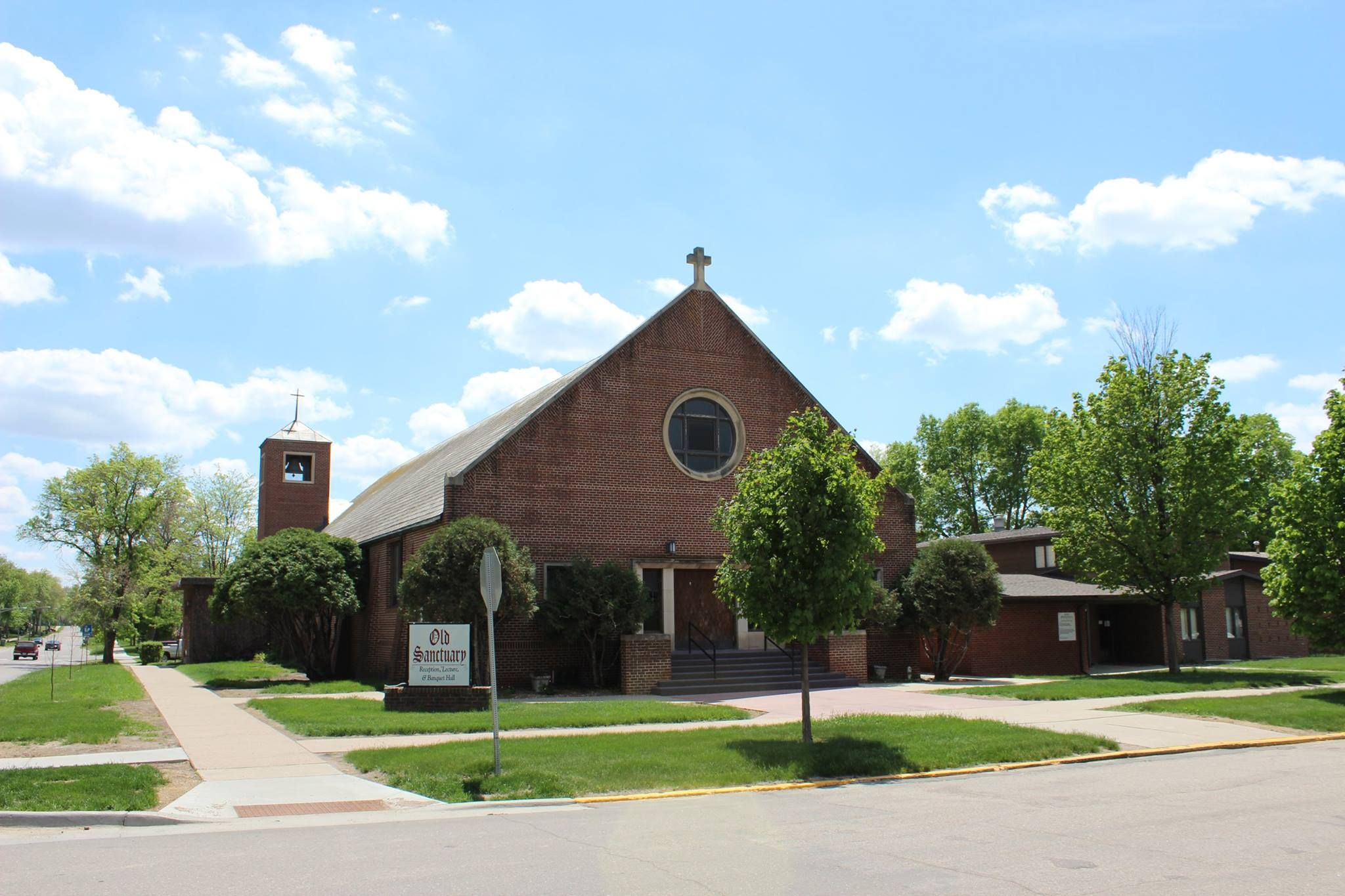
- Institute of Lutheran Theology in Brookings, SD
- Type: Private seminary
- Established: 2009
- Religious affiliation: Independent-Lutheran
- President: Rev. Dr. Dennis Bielfeldt
- Postgraduates: 95
- Location: Brookings, South Dakota, United States
- Website: www.ilt.edu

The Institute of Lutheran Theology is a private Lutheran seminary in Brookings, South Dakota. It provides distance education online and at its campus in Brookings.

== History ==
The Institute of Lutheran Theology was started in 2009 by members of the Evangelical Lutheran Church in America (ELCA) affiliated with the WordAlone Network in order to train Lutheran clergy and other church workers.

The Institute of Lutheran Theology is not supported by a single synod or religious association, but several. These include the North American Lutheran Church, the Lutheran Congregations in Mission for Christ, the Canadian Association of Lutheran Congregations, and the Augsburg Lutheran Churches. Instead, it hires and serves people from several different Lutheran church bodies in the United States, some of which recently formed after separating from the Evangelical Lutheran Church in America and lack seminaries of their own.

== Academics ==
The institution is accredited by the Association for Biblical Higher Education and the Association of Theological Schools. ILT operates as a school which grants certificates and degrees to students who complete their studies with the school. It does not ordain graduates; that is left to the synods and associations which accept their graduates.

== Library ==
The library has 30,000 physical volumes and more through ebrary as well as access to several other academic databases.

== Notable faculty ==
- Robert Benne
- Dennis Bielfeldt
- John Eidsmoe
- Paul Hinlicky
- Jack Kilcrease
- George Tsakiridis
- Lucas V. Woodford (emeritus)

== See also ==
- Confessing Movement
- Lutheran CORE
- ReconcilingWorks
