= List of Lutheran seminaries in North America =

Branch of Protestantism based on the teachings of Martin Luther

== Evangelical Lutheran Church in America ==
The Evangelical Lutheran Church in America (ELCA) has seven seminaries:

- Lutheran School of Theology at Chicago (Illinois)
- Lutheran Theological Southern Seminary (Hickory, North Carolina): merged with Lenoir–Rhyne University
- Luther Seminary (St. Paul, Minnesota)
- Pacific Lutheran Theological Seminary (Berkeley, California): affiliated with California Lutheran University
- Trinity Lutheran Seminary (Columbus, Ohio): merged with Capital University
- United Lutheran Seminary (Philadelphia, Pennsylvania): Merger of Lutheran Theological Seminaries at Gettysburg and Philadelphia
- Wartburg Theological Seminary (Dubuque, Iowa)

In addition, the ELCA sponsors the following seminary education programs, which are not on the campus of an ELCA seminary:

- Lutheran Seminary Program in the Southwest (Austin, Texas)
- Lutheran Theological Center in Atlanta (Georgia)

== Evangelical Lutheran Church in Canada ==
The Evangelical Lutheran Church in Canada (ELCIC) has two seminaries:

- Lutheran Theological Seminary, Saskatoon (Saskatchewan); affiliated with the University of Saskatchewan
- Martin Luther University College (Waterloo, Ontario): federated with Wilfrid Laurier University

== Lutheran Congregations in Mission for Christ ==
Instead of having its own seminaries, Lutheran Congregations in Mission for Christ (LCMC) hosts Lutheran Studies programs at other Christian institutions, some of which are affiliated with and/or serve other Lutheran Denominations:

- Cross-Cultural Ministry Center hosted at Concordia University Irvine (California): affiliated with LCMS
- Sioux Falls Seminary (Sioux Falls, South Dakota): affiliated with the North American Baptist Conference
- Gordon–Conwell Theological Seminary (Hamilton, Massachusetts): non-denominational
- Faith Evangelical Seminary (Tacoma, Washington): non-denominational; also serves the Conservative Lutheran Association (CLA)
- Institute of Lutheran Theology (Brookings, South Dakota): pan-Lutheran

== Lutheran Church–Canada ==
The Lutheran Church–Canada (LCC) has two seminaries:

- Concordia Lutheran Seminary (Edmonton, Alberta)
- Concordia Lutheran Theological Seminary (St. Catharines, Ontario): affiliated with Brock University

== Lutheran Church–Missouri Synod ==
The Lutheran Church–Missouri Synod (LCMS) has two seminaries:

- Concordia Seminary (Clayton, Missouri)
- Concordia Theological Seminary (Fort Wayne, Indiana)

== Other Lutheran bodies ==
- American Association of Lutheran Churches (AALC): American Lutheran Theological Seminary (Global, interactive classroom live teleconference discussions via zoom)
- Association of Free Lutheran Congregations (AFLC): Free Lutheran Bible College and Seminary (Plymouth, Minnesota)
- Church of the Lutheran Brethren of America (CLBA): Lutheran Brethren Seminary (Fergus Falls, Minnesota)
- Church of the Lutheran Confession (CLC): Immanuel Lutheran College (Eau Claire, Wisconsin)
- Evangelical Lutheran Synod (ELS): Bethany Lutheran Theological Seminary (Mankato, Minnesota)
- General Lutheran Church (GLC): Martin Luther School of Bible and Theology (Puerto Rico and Indiana)
- North American Lutheran Church (NALC):
  - North American Lutheran Seminary (Ambridge, Pennsylvania): housed at Trinity School for Ministry (Evangelical Anglican)
  - Institute of Lutheran Theology (Brookings, South Dakota): pan-Lutheran
- Wisconsin Evangelical Lutheran Synod (WELS): Wisconsin Lutheran Seminary

The Augsburg Lutheran Churches and Canadian Association of Lutheran Congregations (CALC) do not have their own seminaries but along with the LCMC and NALC are served by the pan-Lutheran Institute of Lutheran Theology

== See also ==
- List of Lutheran colleges and universities in the United States
