= Confessing Movement =

Conservative movement within Mainline Protestantism

The Confessing Movement is a largely lay-led theologically conservative Christian movement that opposes the influence of theological liberalism and theological progressivism currently within several mainline Protestant denominations and seeks to return those denominations to its view of orthodox doctrine or to form new denominations and disfellowship them if the situation becomes untenable. While those aligned with the Confessing Movement seek to retake Mainline Christian denominations, there are those in the Confessing Movement who eventually deem dealing with theological liberalism within their denominations as not being tenable anymore and would later join or start Confessional churches that continue with the traditions of their respective denominations and maintaining orthodox doctrine while being ecclesiastically separate from the Mainline Protestant denominations. Youth aligned with the Confessing Movement have viewed their project as being an 'Operation Reformation', specifically with respect to seeking to establish theological orthodoxy within Mainline Christian denominations.

It overlaps with other conservative Christian movements including Evangelicalism, and within Methodism specifically, the Holiness movement. Its members have stated their commitment to work to change their home denominations from within rather than establishing new ones, even if they are unable to regain full influence. It also has overlaps with Confessionalism which is identified with the belief in the importance of full and unambiguous assent to the whole of a religious movements' or denominations' teachings such as those found in Confessions of Faith which they see as accurate summaries of the teachings found in Scripture and accurately shows their distinction from other groups. Confessionalism is most visible among Lutherans known as Confessional Lutherans for their adherence to the Book of Concord. The Confessing Movement places particular weight on the role of evangelism and traditional Bible teachings concerning the deity of Christ and holds conservative, historical Christian views on sexuality, especially homosexuality.

Although tension between theological modernizers and traditionalists in American Protestantism has existed for generations, the formation of the Confessing Movement was triggered by changing positions on sexual orientation and especially the ordination of "practicing homosexuals" as clergy. Other issues influencing some groups were the ordination of women, and the decline in attendance of many of the mainline denominations from the 1960s to the 1980s in the US, with leaders of the Confessing Movement arguing that the shrinking of mainline church membership resulted from conservative members leaving for growing evangelical churches rather than liberal members disengaging.

== By Christian denomination ==
=== Lutheran ===
The Communion of Nordic Lutheran Dioceses are non-territorial Lutheran dioceses that entered into schism with their national churches in 2003 due to what they perceived as "the secularization of the national/state churches in their respective countries involving matters of both Christian doctrine and ethics". These dioceses are members of the International Lutheran Council, a body of Confessional Lutherans; they are in full communion with one another and include the Evangelical Lutheran Mission Diocese of Finland, Mission Province of the Church of Sweden, and the Evangelical Lutheran Diocese of Norway.

Conservative traditions have always been strong in the Lutheran synods of North America. Over the last two centuries, most of the many new synods were started by members who felt their synod was straying from Christian orthodoxy. There are several reform movements that have been founded in recent years to effect change within existing Lutheran denominations. The largest of these organizations is the WordAlone Network, organized in 2000 in opposition to the Concordat/Called to Common Mission agreement with the Episcopal Church USA. Under that agreement, the Evangelical Lutheran Church in America (ELCA) agreed to undertake the Episcopal practice of being governed by bishops in the historic episcopate. Many Lutherans saw this as contrary to Lutheran theology and organized in opposition to it. While the WordAlone Network has worked to reform church governance, sometimes with little visible reward for their effort, they succeeded at the 2005 Churchwide Assembly of the ELCA in slowing the efforts of those who sought to revise the understanding of homosexuality within the ELCA. This was accomplished in cooperation with others who did not oppose the historic episcopate through the Solid Rock Lutherans organization. WordAlone has also been an incubator for launching related groups working to reform the church. They include a new publisher of a Lutheran hymnal (Reclaim Lutheran Worship), LC3, and Lutheran CORE. The most successful WordAlone outgrowth is Lutheran Congregations in Mission for Christ (LCMC), a post-denominational association of 724 congregations in ten countries, with 656 of them in the United States.

The Evangelical Lutheran Confessing Fellowship (ELCF) is one of the more recent of these "reform" movements, inspired by the other Protestant "confessing movements" described in this article. The ELCF was organized in Allentown, Pennsylvania, in February, 2002 by about 60 pastors and laypersons who belonged to the Evangelical Lutheran Church in America. The goal of the movement is to remain faithful to the orthodox or traditional teachings of the church, especially with regard to the doctrine of the Holy Trinity, the unique Lordship of Jesus Christ, the authority of scripture, and human sexual intimacy. Its efforts have been to persuade the ELCA to return to orthodox positions with regard to its theology and teachings, rather than separation from the ELCA. According to their initial press release, a primary goal is to head off apparent movement toward formal recognition and ordination of homosexual clergy. In 2005, the proposals to allow ordination of homosexual clergy and blessing of homosexual relationships were defeated at the ELCA's national convention.

In 2005 the Lutheran Coalition for Reform (Lutheran CORE) was formed to organize groups and individuals within the ELCA to uphold the traditional church teachings on the scriptures, marriage, and sexuality. The decisions of the 2009 ELCA Churchwide Assembly to allow pastors to be in same-sex relationships and still preach the ministry caused Lutheran CORE to begin working towards focusing on helping alternative confessing fellowships for Lutherans no matter what church affiliations. Lutheran CORE still maintains membership within the ELCA and the Evangelical Lutheran Church in Canada though they also have affiliations with LCMC and the Lutheran Church – Missouri Synod, among others; Lutheran CORE was also instrumental in the formation of the North American Lutheran Church in 2010 by Lutheran CORE congregations that no longer wished to be part of the ELCA or ELCiC.

Still working within the Evangelical Lutheran Church in America (ELCA) is the Society of Orthodox Lutheran Advocates (SOLA), which aims to restore what it sees as theological orthodoxy in the denomination.

In Germany, the de:Netzwerk Bibel und Bekenntnis was founded in 2016 that "intends to remain faithful" to the "belief in the complete reliability and supreme authority of Holy Scripture in all matters of faith and conduct, in accordance with the Evangelical Alliance's statement of faith". Its founding members comprise several Lutheran pastors, including Ulrich Rüß. He is at the same time the head of the de:Konferenz Bekennender Gemeinschaften in den Evangelischen Kirchen Deutschlands, founded in 1970, as an alternative to the "liberal theology" of the EKD (Evangelische Kirche in Deutschland) and of the Internationale Konferenz Bekennender Gemeinschaften (International Christian Network), founded in 1978 as an international initiative of the German de:Bekenntnisbewegung Kein anderes Evangelium.

=== Methodist ===
The Confessing Movement within the United Methodist Church quotes Methodism's founder, John Wesley:

I AM not afraid, that the people called Methodists, should ever cease to exist either in Europe or America. But I am afraid, lest they should only exist as a dead sect, having the form of religion without the power. And this undoubtedly will be the case, unless they hold fast both the doctrine, spirit, and discipline with which they first set out.

Leaders have included Thomas C. Oden, Maxie Dunnam, Bill Hinson, John Ed Mathison, Karen Covey Moore, William J. Abraham, and James Heidinger. The movement was successful in maintaining doctrinal standards and traditional United Methodist positions on theology and practice at the General Conferences in Cleveland (2000), Pittsburgh (2004), and Fort Worth (2008). At the 2008 conference, for instance, delegates voted to retain language in the Social Creed defining marriage as a union between one man and one woman. They also maintained the traditional teaching that although homosexuals "are individuals of sacred worth", homosexual practice is "incompatible with Christian teaching". After the 2019 United Methodist General Conference, the denomination became sharply divided over the issue of homosexuality and same-sex marriage. Because of this split, there was speculation about the UMC separating or dividing into two or more denominations. An exit plan for dissatisfied congregations was passed by the 2019 General Conference and upheld by the Judicial Council (top court of the United Methodist Conference). In addition, there are proposals for annual conferences to take place for the purpose of regular doctrinal evaluation.

Other Methodist organizations aligned with the Confessing Movement within the United Methodist Church include the Wesleyan Covenant Association, Concerned Methodists, Good News, UM Action, the Independent Committee on Alcohol and Drugs for United Methodists, Transforming Congregations, the Taskforce of United Methodists on Abortion and Sexuality (Lifewatch), and Renew Network. These groups worked together to launch the Global Methodist Church, a traditionalist Methodist denomination, in 2022.

Currently, in The United Methodist Church, a caucus known as Young Methodists for Tradition, works to restore the denomination to what it sees as theological orthodoxy. Associated with the YMFT is Christian apologist Methodist Answers.

Apart from these traditionalist organizations within the United Methodist Church, other theologically traditional Methodist denominations holding views similar to those espoused by the Confessing Movement include the Free Methodist Church, the Missionary Methodist Church, the Primitive Methodist Church, the Holiness Methodist Church, and the Congregational Methodist Church; these churches are all aligned with the Wesleyan-holiness movement. Methodist denominations that have preserved certain distinctives of early Methodism, such as women's headcovering and abstaining from wearing jewelry, include the Fellowship of Independent Methodist Churches and the Evangelical Wesleyan Church, respectively.

As a result of conflict with the United Methodist leadership, the Confessing Movement within the United Methodist Church launched the Global Methodist Church. Other formerly United Methodist congregations aligned with the Confessing Movement within the United Methodist Church chose to join the Free Methodist Church and the Congregational Methodist Church.

=== Episcopalian / Anglican ===
Originating at the first Global Anglican Future Conference in 2008, the Global Fellowship of Confessing Anglicans (GAFCON) encompasses approximately 40 million Confessing Anglicans around the world. It includes Anglican Communion-recognized provinces in Argentina, Bolivia, Chile, the Democratic Republic of the Congo, Kenya, Myanmar, Nigeria, Paraguay, Peru, South Sudan, Uganda, and Uruguay. GAFCON also encompasses as full members provinces in Brazil, Europe, and North America that are not recognized by the Canterbury-aligned structures of the Anglican Communion. GAFCON members also include individual confessing dioceses in Australia, Ghana, and Tanzania, as well as preexisting Anglican breakaway churches such as the Reformed Episcopal Church, the Free Church of England, and REACH-SA, as well as more recent structures such as the Church of Confessing Anglicans Aotearoa/New Zealand and the Diocese of the Southern Cross.

One forerunner of the Anglican Church in North America was the American Anglican Council, which included members of both the mainline Episcopal Church and the eventual ACNA. The council states:

Here are the facts about the Episcopal Church USA (ECUSA) as it currently exists. It is a Church that is no longer in relationship with the majority of Anglicans worldwide. It is a Church that no longer turns to Holy Scripture for its guidance. It is a Church that has chosen the ways of man over the ways of God. It is a church that has undermined the institution of marriage. It is a church with which many worldwide Christian denominations have broken relations. It is a church that has lost its heart and soul and its commitment to making disciples and proclaiming the good news of Jesus Christ.

Still working within The Protestant Episcopal Church in the United States of America is the Episcopal Fellowship for Renewal, which aims to restore what it sees as theological orthodoxy in the denomination.

=== Reformed ===
==== Continental Reformed ====
Working within the Reformed Church in America is the Reformed Revivalists in America, which aims to restore what it sees as theological orthodoxy in the denomination.

==== Presbyterian ====
One of the fastest growing Confessing Movements is within the Presbyterian Church (USA). In February, 2002 more than 800 laity, pastors, deacons, and elders gathered in Atlanta, Georgia for the first National Celebration of Confessing Churches. Participating churches affirm that Christ is the only way of salvation, that the Bible is infallible in its teachings, and that sexual relations are exclusively for marriage.

More than 1,300 of the denomination's 11,000 congregations have adopted such declarations and become part of a loosely knit Confessing Church Movement.

The books Union in Christ: A Declaration for the Church (1999) and A Passion for the Gospel: Confessing Jesus Christ for the 21st Century (2000), both by Mark Achtemeier and Andrew Purves, have served as rallying cries for Confessing Presbyterians.

The positions held by these caucuses is similar to that of denominations such as the Presbyterian Church in America; a more conservative denomination is the Free Presbyterian Church of North America.

Still working within the Presbyterian Church (USA) is Presbyterians for the Kingdom, which aims to restore what it sees as theological orthodoxy in the denomination.

==== United Church of Christ ====
In the United Church of Christ, a denomination in the Congregationalist tradition, the first confessing movement founded was the Biblical Witness Fellowship, formed in 1977 after a General Synod sexuality study that, to the founders, seemed to take a decidedly permissive attitude toward non-marital sex and homosexuality. The BWF advocates a dual goal of local church renewal and national level reformation. Under the leadership of executive director David Runnion-Bareford, a Candia, New Hampshire, pastor, this movement has presented reformation initiatives before each of the last five Synods of the UCC, including a successful reaffirmation of the Lordship of Jesus Christ and the denomination's historic symbol, the "Cross Triumphant," in 2005. "Focus Renewal Ministries" was founded as a charismatic expression within the United Church of Christ, although its membership is small. More recently, some UCC conservatives began a "Faithful and Welcoming" movement, led by the Rev. Bob Thompson, pastor of Hickory, North Carolina's Corinth Reformed UCC. Like the founding of the BWF, that initiative followed the controversial General Synod of 2005 (in which the denomination in effect endorsed the efforts of same-sex couples to marry) and seeks to keep churches from leaving the denomination. Generally speaking, the F&W movement is perceived as less strident than the BWF, which has close relationships with established para-denominational evangelical organizations such as Gordon-Conwell Theological Seminary in Massachusetts.

However, the UCC's renewal advocates have been far less successful than their counterparts in other mainline bodies: according to Faithful and Welcoming, over 250 congregations have withdrawn from the denomination since 2005, and despite the work mentioned above, the national leadership, and probably a majority of the remaining congregations, are resolute in their support of liberal theological and social stands. It is thus likely that laypeople and clergy espousing the aims of BWF, FRM, and F&W will remain small minorities in the denomination for the foreseeable future. Given this scenario, many more of the remaining advocates may well defect to more conservative Congregationalist denominations such as the Conservative Congregational Christian Conference, leaving the UCC as perhaps the U.S.'s most politically and theologically liberal Christian group.

=== Baptists ===
Working within the American Baptist Churches USA is the American Baptists for Biblical Authority (ABBA), which aims to restore what it sees as theological orthodoxy in the denomination.

=== United ===
==== Uniting Church in Australia ====
The Assembly of Confessing Congregations of the Uniting Church in Australia formed in 2006. It is the result of the coming together of two groups: the Reforming Alliance (est. 2003 in response decision by the UCA's 2003 Assembly not ban outright on the ordination of practicing homosexuals,) and the Evangelical Members within the Uniting Church in Australia (EMU) (est. in the early 1990s as a conservative response to what was seen as the church's growing liberalism).

Some traditionalist members of the Uniting Church in Australia have left to join conservative denominations, with those who are Wesleyan-Arminian in theology joining the Free Methodist Church and those who are Reformed in theology joining groups such as the Free Presbyterian Church.

== Notable people ==
- Redeemed Zoomer, YouTuber. He is a member of the Presbyterian Church (USA) and founded "Operation Reformation", a movement of theologically conservative Christians seeking to reform and revitalize the Mainline Protestant denominations with the eventual goal of restoring them to theological orthodoxy.

== See also ==
- Biblical criticism
- Christianity and abortion
- Christianity and homosexuality
- Neo-orthodoxy
- Theistic evolution
