= Homosexuality and Lutheranism =

Lutheran viewpoints concerning homosexuality are diverse because there is no one worldwide body which represents all Lutherans. The Lutheran World Federation, a worldwide 'communion of churches' and the largest global body of Lutherans, contains member churches on both sides of the issue. However, other Lutherans, including the Confessional Evangelical Lutheran Conference and International Lutheran Council, completely reject homosexuality.

== Luther's view ==
Martin Luther, who had spent time in Rome, claimed that Pope Leo X had vetoed a measure that cardinals should restrict the number of boys they kept for their pleasure, "otherwise it would have been spread throughout the world how openly and shamelessly the pope and the cardinals in Rome practice sodomy" and encouraged Germans not to spend time fighting fellow countrymen in defense of the papacy.

Luther also noted:

I for my part do not enjoy dealing with this passage [Genesis 19:4-5], because so far the ears of the Germans are innocent of and uncontaminated by this monstrous depravity; for even though disgrace, like other sins, has crept in through an ungodly soldier and a lewd merchant, still the rest of the people are unaware of what is being done in secret. The Carthusian monks deserve to be hated because they were the first to bring this terrible pollution into Germany from the monasteries of Italy.

The heinous conduct of the people of Sodom is extraordinary, inasmuch as they departed from the natural passion and longing of the male for the female, which was implanted by God, and desired what is altogether contrary to nature. Whence comes this perversity: Undoubtedly from Satan, who, after people have once turned away from the fear of God, so powerfully suppresses nature that he beats out natural desire and stirs up a desire that is contrary to nature.

== Synods allowing homosexual relationships ==
=== In North America ===
In 1970, Strommen, et al. surveyed 4,745 Lutheran adults between the ages of 15 and 65. They were members of the American Lutheran Church, Lutheran Church in America, and Lutheran Church–Missouri Synod. 1% stated that they frequently had homosexual intercourse during the past year and 3% stated that they did so occasionally. 90% said that they never had homosexual intercourse during the past year, and 7% did not respond.

==== Evangelical Lutheran Church in America ====
The Evangelical Lutheran Church in America, the largest Lutheran church body in the United States, allows for LGBTQ+ marriage and ordination of LGBTQ+ clergy. ELCA policy states that LGBTQ+ individuals are welcome and encouraged to become members and to participate in the life of the congregation. The ELCA has provided supplemental resources for the rite of marriage in Evangelical Lutheran Worship which use inclusive language and are suitable for use in LGBTQ+ marriage ceremonies. The group ReconcilingWorks supports the full inclusion of LGBTQ+ members in Lutheran churches in the ELCA, and provides resources to assist ELCA congregations in becoming more welcoming communities for LGBTQ+ persons. ReconcilingWorks recognizes ELCA congregations that have committed to embracing LGBTQ+ persons as Reconciling in Christ congregations.

The current policy on LGBTQ+ inclusion in the ELCA developed over a period of several years.

In 2001, a Social Statement on Sexuality was requested by the Churchwide Assembly and entrusted to a Task Force. In light of the ongoing work of that task force, the 2007 Churchwide Assembly passed a resolution asking bishops to exercise restraint in discipline of those congregations and pastors in violation of 'Vision and Expectations.'

Prior to August 2009, the ELCA expected "ordained ministers who are homosexual in their self-understanding" to "abstain from homosexual sexual relationships".

The 2009 ELCA Churchwide Assembly in Minneapolis passed "Human Sexuality, Gift and Trust", which approved more positive assessments of same-gender partnerships in the church. On 21 August 2009, the same body passed four ministry policy resolutions that opened the way for congregations to recognize and support such partnerships and for those in committed same-gender partnerships to be rostered leaders within the ELCA. A separate motion at the same assembly recommended that a rite of blessing for same-sex unions be provided.

In 2013, Guy Erwin, who has lived in a gay partnership for 19 years, was installed in California as Bishop of the ELCA's Southwest California Synod, becoming the first openly gay person to serve as a Bishop in the ELCA.

Also in 2015, after the Supreme Court legalized same-sex marriage nationally in the US, the office of the presiding bishop released a letter informing members that each congregation is free to bless same-sex marriages or to choose not to do so.

==== Evangelical Lutheran Church in Canada ====
In July 2011 Churchwide Assembly of Evangelical Lutheran Church in Canada passed a new sexuality statement, permitting clergy in committed same-gender partnerships and allowing the blessing of same-sex unions.

=== In Europe ===
In many European Lutheran churches, open LGBT people can work as Lutheran pastors. In the United Kingdom, the Lutheran Church in Great Britain allows the ordination of LGBT people and permits same-sex marriage.

==== EKD in Germany ====
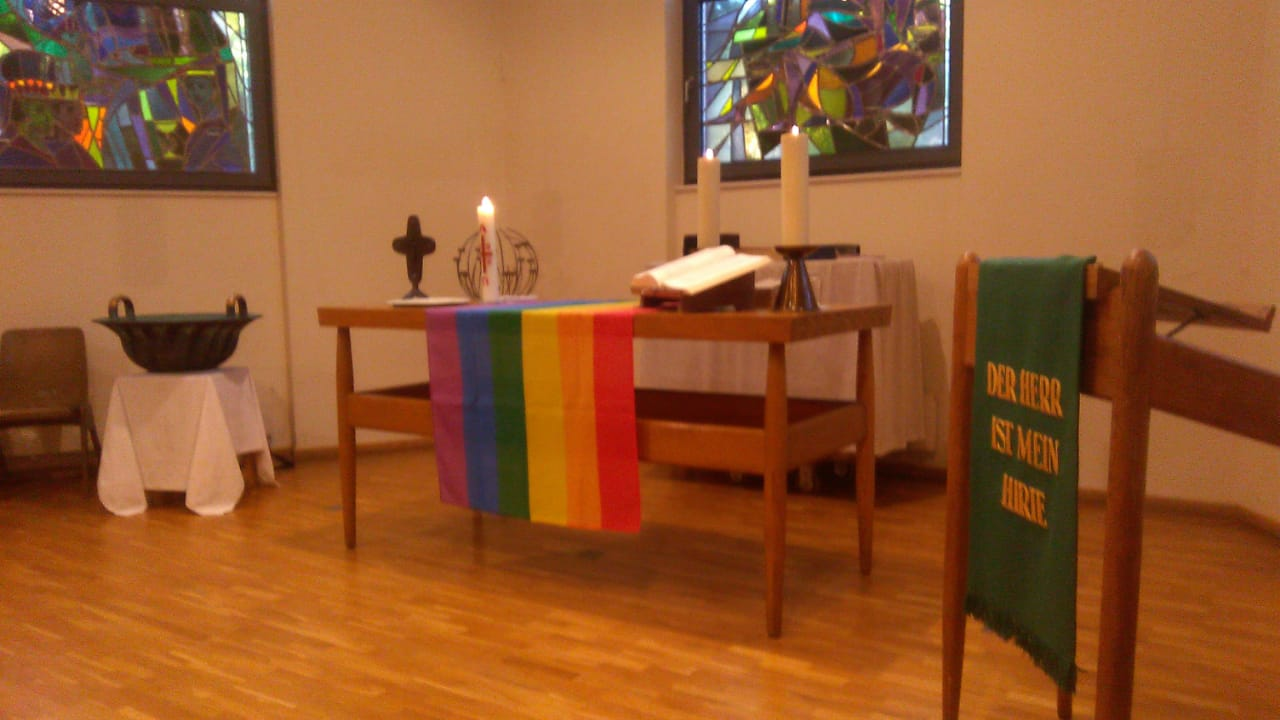
Ecumenical worship service at the Emmaus Church in Berlin, Germany.

Churches in the German EKD, where blessings of same-sex marriages were allowed in 2020 (dark purple); churches with blessings of same-sex unions (in light purple).

In the year 2000, the Evangelical Church in Germany (EKD) passed the resolution Verantwortung und Verlässlichkeit stärken, in which same-gender partnerships are supported. In November 2010, EKD passed a new right for LGBT ordination of homosexual ministers, who live in civil unions. All churches within the EKD allowed blessing of same-sex marriages.

1. Evangelical Church in Baden (Evangelische Landeskirche in Baden), a united church body in Baden
2. Evangelical Church Berlin-Brandenburg-Silesian Upper Lusatia (Evangelische Kirche in Berlin-Brandenburg-schlesische Oberlausitz), a united church body in Berlin-Brandenburg-Silesian Upper Lusatia merged in 2004 from:
  - Evangelische Kirche in Berlin-Brandenburg
  - Evangelische Kirche der schlesischen Oberlausitz
3. Evangelical Church of Bremen (Bremische Evangelische Kirche), a united church body in Bremen
4. Protestant Lutheran State Church of Brunswick (Evangelisch-Lutherische Landeskirche in Braunschweig), a Lutheran church body in Brunswick
5. Evangelical-Lutheran Church of Hanover (Evangelisch-Lutherische Landeskirche Hannovers), a Lutheran church body in the former Province of Hanover
6. Protestant Church in Hesse and Nassau (Evangelische Kirche in Hessen und Nassau), a united church body in the former People's State of Hesse and Nassau
7. Evangelical Church of Hesse Electorate-Waldeck (Evangelische Kirche von Kurhessen-Waldeck), a united church body in former Hesse-Cassel and Waldeck
8. Church of Lippe (Lippische Landeskirche), a Reformed church body of Lippe
9. Evangelical Church in Central Germany (Evangelische Kirche in Mitteldeutschland), a united church body that was created in 2009 from the merger of:
  - Evangelical Church of the Church Province of Saxony (Evangelische Kirche der Kirchenprovinz Sachsen) (Province of Saxony)
  - Evangelical-Lutheran Church in Thuringia (Evangelisch-Lutherische Kirche in Thüringen) (Thuringia)
10. Evangelical Lutheran Church in Northern Germany (Evangelisch-Lutherische Kirche in Norddeutschland) a Lutheran church body that was created in 2012 from the merger of:
  - North Elbian Evangelical Lutheran Church (Nordelbische Evangelisch-Lutherische Kirche), a Lutheran church body in Northern Germany
  - Evangelical Lutheran Church of Mecklenburg (Evangelisch-Lutherische Landeskirche Mecklenburgs), a Lutheran church body in Mecklenburg
  - Pomeranian Evangelical Church (Pommersche Evangelische Kirche), a united church body in Pomerania
11. Evangelical Lutheran Church in Oldenburg (Evangelisch-Lutherische Kirche in Oldenburg), a Lutheran church body in Oldenburg
12. Evangelical Church of the Palatinate (Evangelische Kirche der Pfalz) or Protestantische Landeskirche, a united church body in Palatinate
13. Evangelical Church in the Rhineland (Evangelische Kirche im Rheinland), a united church body in the Rhineland
14. Evangelical-Lutheran Church of Saxony (Evangelisch-Lutherische Landeskirche Sachsens), a Lutheran church body in Saxony
15. Evangelical Church of Westphalia (Evangelische Kirche von Westfalen), a united church body in Westphalia
16. Evangelical Reformed Church (Regional Church) Evangelisch-reformierte Kirche (Landeskirche), a Reformed church body, covering the territories of No. 3, 5, 7, 12, 16, 17, and 19
17. Evangelical Lutheran Church in Bavaria (Evangelische-Lutherische Landeskirche in Bayern), a Lutheran church body in Bavaria
18. Evangelical-Lutheran Church in Württemberg, a Lutheran church body in Württemberg
19. Evangelical Lutheran Church of Schaumburg-Lippe, a Lutheran church body in Lower Saxony
20. Evangelical Church of Anhalt, a United church body in Saxony-Anhalt

==== Czech Republic ====
The Evangelical Church of Czech Brethren has permitted the blessing of same-sex unions since May 2023.

==== Nordic countries ====
The Church of Iceland allows same-sex marriage. The Church of Sweden has permitted the blessing of same-sex unions and the ordination of partnered gays and lesbians since 2006. Starting in November 2009, the church officiates same-sex marriage, after the Riksdag allowed same-sex marriage starting 1 May 2009 – however, individual priests can choose not to perform marriages for couples of the same gender. The Church of Denmark also provides for such blessings, as does the Church of Norway, which also ordains gays and lesbians.

The Evangelical Lutheran Church of Finland was the largest Lutheran church in Europe that didn't permit blessing of same-sex unions until May 2024 – despite ongoing controversy. As of October 2010 the Church of Finland allows priests to pray for same-sex couples: For registered partnerships, the church says that "the [same-sex] couple may organise prayers with a priest or other church workers and invited guests". Additionally, Archbishop Kari Mäkinen expressed his support for the new law permitting same-gender marriages. In 2016, although the bishops in Finland did not agree to perform same-sex marriages, "bishops have taken the position that it is possible to hold prayer services to bless same-sex couples". Tens of thousands of Finns have resigned from the church during the 2010s due to comments made by church officials either supporting or condemning same sex marriages and relations. in 2018 59 members of church's synod voted against homosexual marriage and 49 supported it.In May 2024, same-sex marriages were in Evangelical Lutheran Church of Finland allowed.

=== South America ===
==== Argentina and Uruguay ====
The Evangelical Church of the River Plate, which includes Lutherans and Waldensians, and the United Lutheran Church have supported civil unions and same-sex marriages.

==== Evangelical Church of the Lutheran Confession in Brazil ====
In 2011, the church released a pastoral letter accepting the Supreme Court's decision to allow same-sex marriage in Brazil, and supported the families of same-sex couples.

==== Chile ====
The Evangelical Lutheran Church of Chile (IELCH) embraces inclusivity by recognizing and accepting homosexuality, thereby permitting the ordination of LGBT pastors and the marriage of same-sex couples. Additionally, it was one of the first Christian denominations in Chile to support gay civil unions in 2011.

== Denominations against homosexual activity ==
=== In Africa ===
- The Evangelical Lutheran Church in Tanzania (ELCT) in the official statement labeled as Dodoma statement does not accept any reasons whatsoever of legalizing the same-sex marriages and holds view that accepting same sex marriages sabotages the foundation of the Word of God concerning continued procreation.

=== In North America ===
- The Lutheran Church–Missouri Synod
- The Concordia Lutheran Conference
- The Lutheran Church-Canada
- The Wisconsin Evangelical Lutheran Synod
- The Association of Free Lutheran Congregations
- The Evangelical Lutheran Synod
- The North American Lutheran Church
- Lutheran Congregations in Mission for Christ
- Church of the Lutheran Brethren of America
- Church of the Lutheran Confession

=== In Europe ===
- The Silesian Evangelical Church of the Augsburg Confession condemns homosexual behavior as sin.
- The Evangelical Lutheran Free Church (Germany) views homosexuality as hurting the natural order.
- The Independent Evangelical-Lutheran Church, Germany
- The Evangelical Lutheran Church of England (ELCE)
- The Evangelical Lutheran Church in Lithuania
- The Evangelical Church of the Augsburg Confession in Poland
- The Evangelical Church of the Augsburg Confession in Slovakia (ECAV)
- The Evangelical Lutheran Church of Latvia

=== In South America ===
- Argentinian Evangelical Lutheran Church
- Evangelical Lutheran Church of Brazil
- Confessional Lutheran Church of Chile

=== In South-East Asia ===
- Lutheran Church in Malaysia holds that same sex activities constitutes a decisive choice and is clearly prohibited according to the Scripture

== See also ==
- Homosexuality and Christianity
- 2009 ELCA Churchwide Assembly
