= Dan Selbo =

American Lutheran Bishop

The Reverend Dr. Daniel W. Selbo
- 3rd Bishop of the NALC
- Church: North American Lutheran Church
- In office: 2019–present
- Previous posts: Pastor of St. Timothy's Lutheran Church (San Jose, California); dean of the NALC Central Pacific Mission District

Orders
- Ordination: June 22, 1986 (ELCA)
- Consecration: August 9, 2019 by The Rev. John Bradosky (former Bishop of the NALC), the Rev. Paull Spring (former Provisional Bishop of the NALC and former Bishop of the ELCA Northwestern Pennsylvania Synod), the Rev. Yonas Yigezu (President of the EECMY), and the Rt. Rev. Dr. Alex Mkumbo (Bishop of the Central Diocese of the Evangelical Lutheran Church in Tanzania)

Personal details
- Born: August 29, 1955 (age 71)
- Education: San Jose State University; Luther Seminary

Dan Selbo (born 1955) is an American Lutheran bishop. He is the third bishop of the North American Lutheran Church, having been elected on 9 August 2019. He followed the Rev. John Bradosky, who served as the bishop from 2011 to 2019. Selbo is married to Mary.

== Ecclesiastical career ==
Selbo graduated from San Jose State University in San Jose, California, in 1982 with a Bachelor of Arts in religious studies, and from Luther Seminary in St. Paul, Minnesota, in 1986 with a Master of Divinity. In 2013, Selbo earned a Doctor of Ministry in Biblical preaching from Luther Seminary.

He had 33 years of pastoral experience when he was elected the third Bishop of the NALC. He was senior pastor of St. Timothy's Lutheran Church in San Jose, California, dean of the NALC Central Pacific Mission District, and had served on the planning team that led to the creation of the North American Lutheran Church in June 2010.

He was elected the third bishop of the North American Lutheran Church at its convocation, which brought together more than 800 Lutherans in Indianapolis, Indiana, on 9 August 2019, to serve for a four-year term. The convocation was attended by representatives from a number of ecumenical partner churches, including the Ethiopian Evangelical Church Mekane Yesus, the Evangelical Lutheran Church in Tanzania, the Anglican Church in North America, the Lutheran Church—Missouri Synod, the Common Ground Christian Network, the Global Confessional and Missional Lutheran Forum, the Church Coalition for the Bible and Confession, the International Christian Network, and the U.S. Conference of Catholic Bishops.

== See also ==
- List of bishops of the North American Lutheran Church

Religious titles
Preceded by Office created	Dean of the NALC Central Pacific Mission District; 2010–2019	Succeeded by Douglas Schoelles
Preceded by John Bradosky	Bishop of the North American Lutheran Church; 2019–Present	Succeeded by Incumbent
