= Lutheran Theological Seminary =

Lutheran Theological Seminary may refer to:

- Bethany Lutheran Theological Seminary
- Concordia Lutheran Theological Seminary, St. Catharines, Ontario
- Northwestern Lutheran Theological Seminary, now called Luther Seminary, Saint Paul, Minnesota
- Lutheran Theological Seminary at Gettysburg
- Lutheran Theological Seminary at Philadelphia
- Lutheran Theological Seminary, Saskatoon
- Lutheran Theological Southern Seminary in Hickory, North Carolina
- Pacific Lutheran Theological Seminary, Berkeley, California
- Lutheran Theological Seminary, Leipzig

== See also ==
- Lutheran Theological Southern Seminary, Hickory, North Carolina
- List of Lutheran seminaries in North America
