= Richard Ackerman =

Richard Ackerman may refer to:

- Dick Ackerman (born 1942), California State Senator
- Richard Henry Ackerman (1903–1992), American prelate of the Roman Catholic Church
- Redeemed Zoomer, YouTube handle of Richard Ackerman, American Presbyterian activist and YouTuber
