= List of bishops of the North American Lutheran Church =

This table lists the bishops who have served as the chief ecclesiastical leaders of the North American Lutheran Church since its founding in 2010.

== Table of bishops ==
No.	Bishop	Image	Took office	Left office	Mission District	Length of term
1	Paull Spring	—	August 27, 2010	August 11, 2011	Atlantic Mission District	349 days
2	John Bradosky	John Bradosky	August 11, 2011	August 9, 2019	Southwest Ohio Mission District	7 years, 363 days
3	Dan Selbo	—	August 9, 2019	Incumbent	Central Pacific Mission District	6 years, 179 days
