= Upper Arlington Lutheran Church =

Upper Arlington Lutheran Church (UALC)
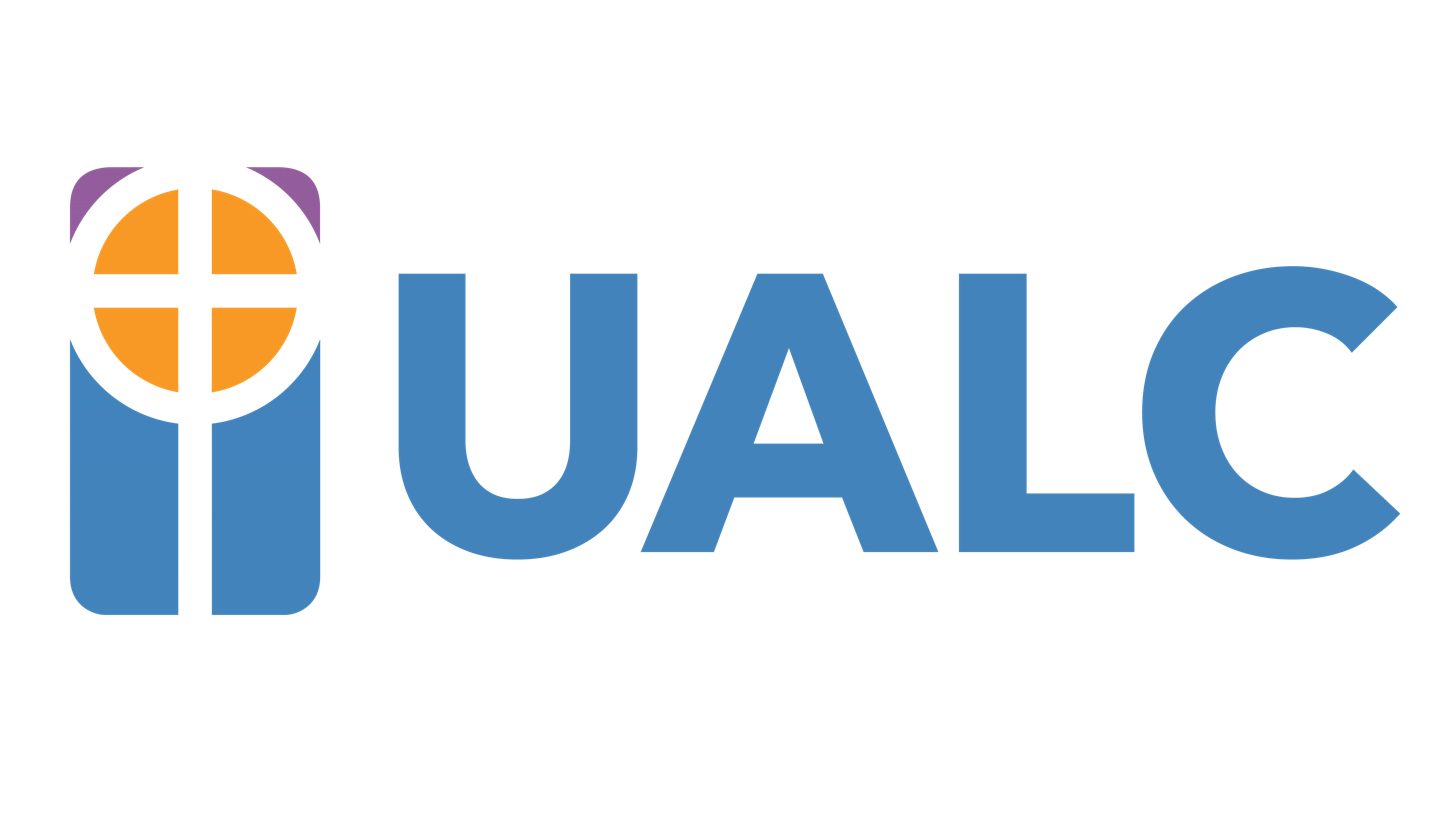
- Upper Arlington Lutheran Church (UALC)
- Lytham Road: 40°02′11″N 83°04′43″W; Mill Run: 40°01′30″N 83°07′03″W
- Location: 2300 Lytham Road, Upper Arlington, Ohio; 3500 Mill Run Drive, Hilliard, Ohio
- Country: United States
- Denomination: North American Lutheran Church, Lutheran Congregations in Mission for Christ
- Website: ualc.org

History
- Founded: 1956
- Founder: American Lutheran Church

Clergy
- Pastor(s): Steve Turnbull, Aaron Thompson, Joe Valentino, David White, and Paul Ulring

Upper Arlington Lutheran Church (UALC) is an American multi-site Lutheran megachurch located in the northwestern Columbus suburbs of Upper Arlington and Hilliard, Ohio. It was founded in 1956 as a Lutheran mission by the former American Lutheran Church (now the Evangelical Lutheran Church in America). UALC is now associated in denomination with the North American Lutheran Church and Lutheran Congregations in Mission for Christ. The church has over 2000 members, and four weekend services averaging 1,000 attendees, making it one of the largest Lutheran churches in the United States.

== Church organization ==
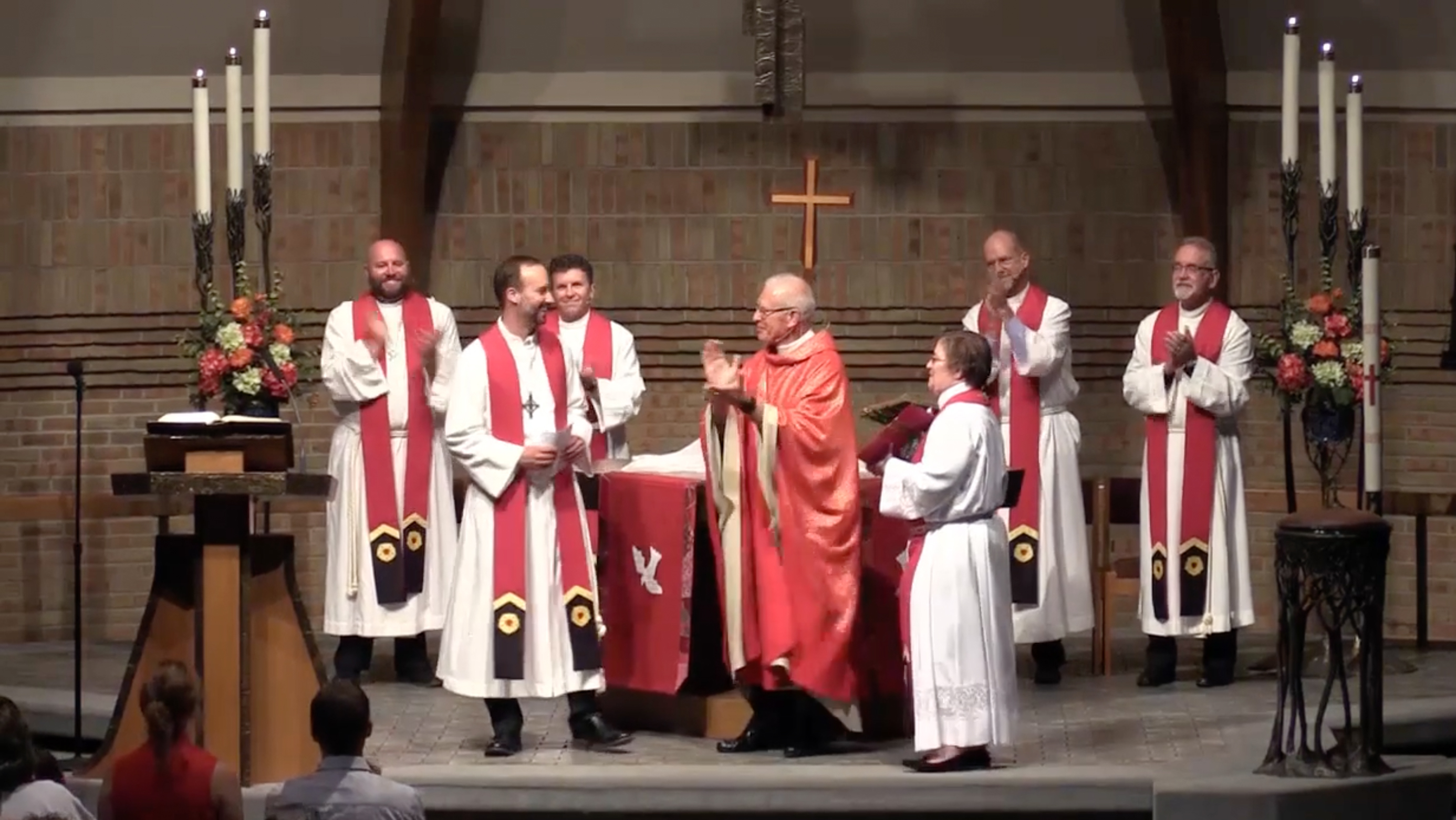
UALC pastors gather for ordination service with NALC bishop, Rev. John Bradosky.

UALC's leadership is divided into three sections:

- Pastors and Lay Ministers
- Church Council
- Executive Staff

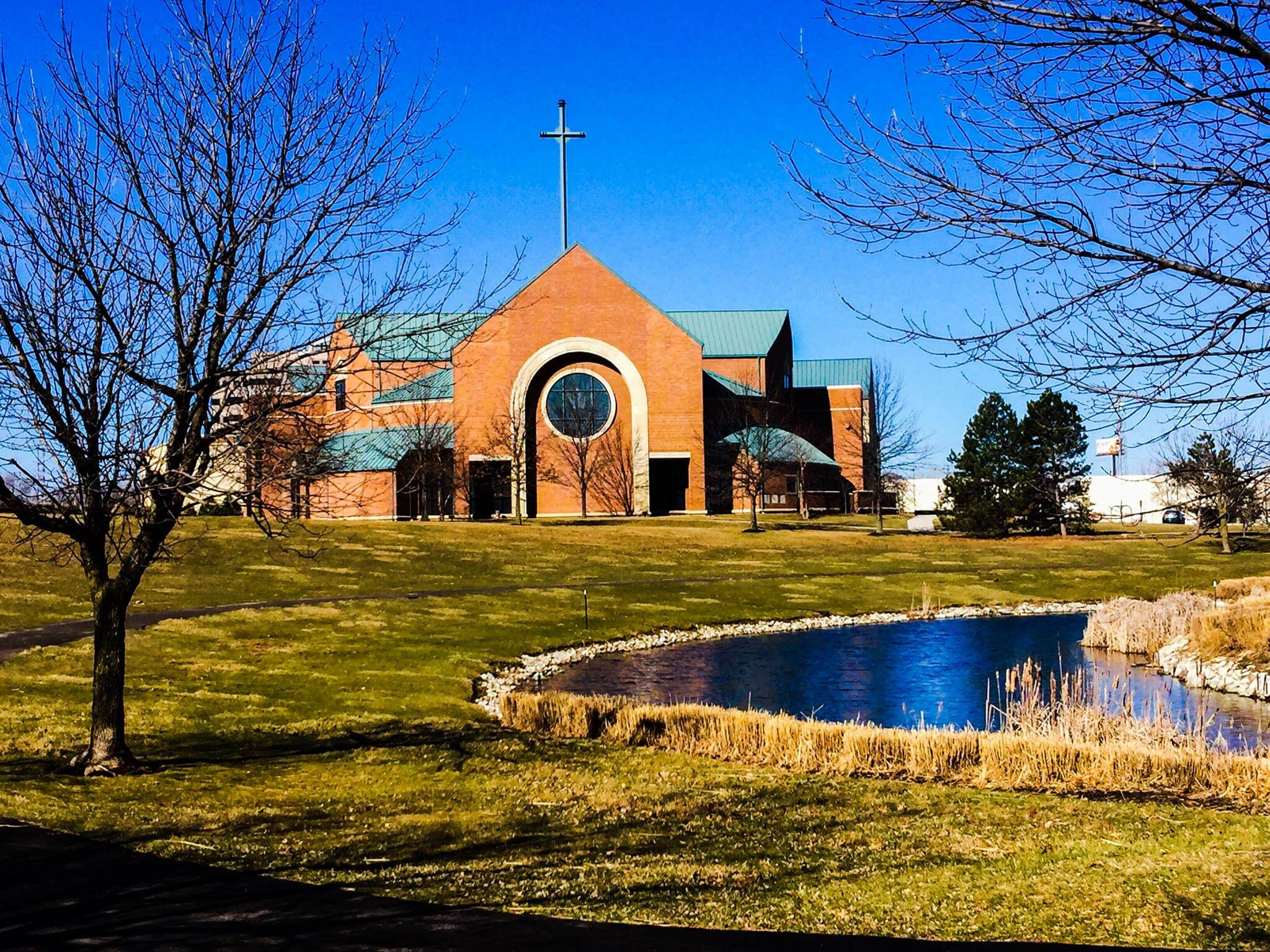
UALC's Mill Run campus (Hilliard).

UALC has four Sunday worship services:

- Meets at Lytham Road Campus in Upper Arlington
  - Traditional Service (9:00 am) & Modern Service (11:00 am)
- Meets at Mill Run Campus in Hilliard
  - UALC Modern Worship (9:00 am & 11:00 am)
