= Solid Rock =

Solid Rock may refer to:

== Organizations ==
- Solid Rock Lutherans, a movement within the Evangelical Lutheran Church in America

== Albums ==
- Solid Rock (The Temptations album)
- Solid Rock (The Rolling Stones album)

== Songs ==
- "Solid Rock" (hymn)
- "Solid Rock" (Desperation Band song)
- "Solid Rock" (Dire Straits song)
- "Solid Rock" (Goanna song)
- "Solid Rock", by Delirious? on the album Now Is the Time – Live at Willow Creek
- "Solid Rock", by Bob Dylan on the album Saved

== Other uses ==
- Solid Rock Records, the record label of Larry Norman
