= List of Lutheran colleges and universities in the United States =

This is a list of higher education Lutheran colleges and universities in the United States:

== Current institutions ==
Affiliations:

- CLC = Church of the Lutheran Confession
- ELCA = Evangelical Lutheran Church in America
- ELS = Evangelical Lutheran Synod
- Ind. = Independent Lutheran
- LCMS = Lutheran Church–Missouri Synod
- WELS = Wisconsin Evangelical Lutheran Synod

College or university	Location	Year founded	Affiliation	Undergraduate students	Graduate students	Endowment
Augsburg University	Minneapolis, Minnesota	1869	ELCA	2,527	722	$80.9 million
Augustana College	Rock Island, Illinois	1860	ELCA	2,522	48	$252.6 million
Augustana University	Sioux Falls, South Dakota	1860	ELCA	2,003	387	$100 million
Bethany College	Lindsborg, Kansas	1881	ELCA	611	4	$7.62 million
Bethany Lutheran College	Mankato, Minnesota	1927	ELS	856	43	$41.6 million
California Lutheran University	Thousand Oaks, California	1959	ELCA	2,297	1,054	$157.6 million
Capital University	Bexley, Ohio	1830	ELCA	1,609	654	$155.2 million
Carthage College	Kenosha, Wisconsin	1847	ELCA	2,675	169	$162.95 million
Concordia College	Moorhead, Minnesota	1891	ELCA	1,864	71	$212.3 million
Concordia University Ann Arbor	Ann Arbor, Michigan	1962	LCMS	908	211	$12.8 million
Concordia University Irvine	Irvine, California	1976	LCMS	1,544	2,114	$23.6 million
Concordia University Chicago	River Forest, Illinois	1864	LCMS	1,368	3,402	$24.7 million
Concordia University St. Paul	Saint Paul, Minnesota	1893	LCMS	3,424	2,579	$70.1 million
Concordia University Nebraska	Seward, Nebraska	1894	LCMS	3,000	479	$54 million
Concordia University Texas	Austin, Texas	1926	Independent	1,188	208	$24.7 million
Concordia University Wisconsin	Mequon, Wisconsin	1881	LCMS	2,401	2,852	$142.6 million
Gettysburg College	Gettysburg, Pennsylvania	1832	ELCA	2,104	708	$459.2 million
Grand View University	Des Moines, Iowa	1896	ELCA	1,500	356	$39.9 million
Gustavus Adolphus College	St. Peter, Minnesota	1862	ELCA	1,905	1	$328.7 million
Immanuel Lutheran College	Eau Claire, Wisconsin	1959	CLC		-	–
Lenoir–Rhyne University	Hickory, North Carolina	1891	ELCA	1,472	784	$145.5 million
Luther College	Decorah, Iowa	1861	ELCA	1,384	-	$220.2 million
Martin Luther College	New Ulm, Minnesota	1995	WELS	770	108	$15.1 million
Midland University	Fremont, Nebraska	1883	ELCA	1,309	249	$18.5 million
Muhlenberg College	Allentown, Pennsylvania	1848	ELCA	1,737	51	$337.3 million
Newberry College	Newberry, South Carolina	1856	ELCA	1,481	55	$18 million
Pacific Lutheran University	Tacoma, Washington	1890	ELCA	2,446	351	$97.2 million
Roanoke College	Salem, Virginia	1842	ELCA	1,793	11	$175.5 million
St. Olaf College	Northfield, Minnesota	1874	ELCA	3,124	-	$881.6 million
Susquehanna University	Selinsgrove, Pennsylvania	1858	ELCA	2,246	9	$242.6 million
Texas Lutheran University	Seguin, Texas	1891	ELCA	1,319	104	$102.3 million
Thiel College	Greenville, Pennsylvania	1866	ELCA	833	117	$33.6 million
Valparaiso University	Valparaiso, Indiana	1859	Ind.	2,123	456	$321.45 million
Wagner College	Staten Island, New York City	1883	ELCA	1,666	335	$100.5 million
Wartburg College	Waverly, Iowa	1852	ELCA	1,462	21	$110.7 million
Wisconsin Lutheran College	Wauwatosa, Wisconsin	1973	WELS	957	70	$51.2 million
Wittenberg University	Springfield, Ohio	1845	ELCA	1,227	58	$119 million

== Former institutions ==
College or university	Location	Years of operation	Affiliation	Notes
California Concordia College	Oakland, California	1906–1973	LCMS	
Concordia College Alabama	Selma, Alabama	1963–2018	LCMS	Historically Black College
Concordia College	Fort Wayne, Indiana	1839–1957	LCMS	Prepared men for study in the LCMS seminaries
Concordia College	Conover, North Carolina	1878–1935	LCMS	Founded by members of the Evangelical Lutheran Tennessee Synod
Concordia College	Bronxville, New York	1881–2021	LCMS	
Concordia Senior College	Fort Wayne, Indiana	1957–1977	LCMS	Prepared men for study in the LCMS seminaries
Concordia University	Portland, Oregon	1905–2020	LCMS	
Dana College	Blair, Nebraska	1884–2010	ELCA	Founded by the United Danish Evangelical Lutheran Church
Elizabeth College	Charlotte, North Carolina, and Salem, Virginia	1896–1922	Ind.	College for women
Finlandia University	Hancock, Michigan	1896–2023	ELCA	
Gale College	Galesville, Wisconsin	1854–1939	Norwegian Synod	Founded as a non-sectarian school, later run by the Methodists and Presbyterians, taken over by the Synod of the Norwegian Evangelical Lutheran Church in America in 1901
Golden Valley Lutheran College	Golden Valley, Minnesota	1919–1985	Ind.	Opened as Lutheran Bible Institute in Minneapolis
Illinois State University	Springfield, Illinois	1847–1868	Ind.	Opened as Hillsboro College in Hillsboro, Illinois
Immanuel Lutheran College	Greensboro, North Carolina	1903–1961	Synodical Conference	For the training of black pastors and teachers; founded in Concord, North Carolina
Kee Mar College	Hagerstown, Maryland	1853–1911	Ind.	College for women
Marion College	Marion, Virginia	1873–1967	Ind.	Junior college for women
St. John's College	Winfield, Kansas	1893–1986	LCMS	
Trinity Lutheran College	Everett, Washington	1944–2016	Ind.	
Upsala College	East Orange (main campus); Wantage Township, New Jersey (Wirths Campus)	1893–1995	ELCA	Founded by the Augustana Synod
Waldorf College	Forest City, Iowa	1903–	ELCA	In 2010 the college was sold to a subsidiary of Columbia Southern University and is no longer affiliated with ELCA.

== See also ==
- Concordia University System
- List of ELCA colleges and universities
- List of Calvinist educational institutions in North America
- List of Lutheran denominations in North America
- List of Lutheran seminaries in North America
