= Assembly of Confessing Congregations (Uniting Church in Australia) =

- Type: Confessing Movement
- Classification: Protestant
- Theology: Evangelical, Wesleyan
- Associations: An organisation within the Uniting Church in Australia
- Region: Australia
- Origin: 13–14 October 2006; Sydney
- Defunct: March 2023
- Congregations: 112

The Assembly of Confessing Congregations (ACC) was an evangelical or conservative Christian group, an expression of the Confessing Movement, within the Uniting Church in Australia (UCA) that formed after the 11th Assembly, on 13–14 October 2006 following a joint summit on 12 July 2006 between the Evangelical Members within the Uniting Church in Australia (EMU) and the Reforming Alliance within the Uniting Church in Australia. The group also includes a number of UCA congregations drawing their membership from various Pacific Islands nations, as well as Chinese, Korean and Aboriginal congregations.

The organisation ceased operations in March 2023 and called for evangelical members and churches from within the Uniting Church to separate from it.

== History ==
The Assembly of Confessing Congregations of the Uniting Church in Australia is a group of congregations within the UCA which has responded publicly to certain decisions and actions of the National Assembly of the UCA. The response of these congregations is to declare, among other things, that they believe that the National Assembly’s decisions on same gender sexual relationships are apostate, and are the result of departure from substantial elements of the faith. The ACC has responded by confessing the apostolic faith in solidarity with the confessing movement internationally.

— "About The Assembly"

=== Evangelical Members within the Uniting Church in Australia (EMU) ===
EMU (previously known as Evangelical Ministers of the UCA) was strongest in South Australia where Methodism was the strongest strand coming into the UCA. EMU had gained prominence as a result of their opposition to gay ordination in the lead up to the 1997 Assembly, however while gay ordination was the catalyst in forming this group, EMU focused on the issue of Biblical authority.

The purpose of EMU was stated to be:

- Preserve the unity of the Uniting Church,
- Provide a fellowship of support and encouragement for evangelical believers, enabling them to continue within the life of the UCA.
- Provide a fellowship which works for justice and respect for evangelical believers, encouraging them to make a distinctive, vital and faithful contribution to the church, and
- Encourage and nurture that evangelical faith upon which the Uniting Church is founded.

=== The Reforming Alliance within the Uniting Church (RA) ===
The RA within the Uniting Church was established in 2003 in response to the 10th Assembly's decision not to ban outright the ordination of non-celibate gay people.

=== The Assembly of Confessing Congregations within the Uniting Church in Australia (ACC) ===
The Assembly of Confessing Congregations within the Uniting Church in Australia (ACC) formed in response to the 11th's Assembly decision to pass a resolution which they believed brought the church closer to accepting ordained ministers in same gender relationships. It was inaugurated on the 13–14 October 2006 at Wesley Mission, Sydney 71 congregations formed the ACC at that time. They promulgated a statement on sexuality in response to this. They declared that the Uniting Church had been "apostate" in their decision making in regards to sexuality and leadership within the Uniting Church, with some Uniting Church members felt that the ACC was a church within a church.

== Government ==
The ACC is composed of congregations that each decided through a formal meeting to join.

== Founding document and other documents ==
A statement of sexuality, The Charter and a Confessing Statement.

== Congregations ==
112 Congregations are listed as being members of the ACC, with the majority located in South Australia (40), NSW (33) and Queensland (23). The Uniting Church overall has 2000 congregations.
