= John Bradosky =

American Lutheran Bishop

The Reverend John F. Bradosky
- Second Bishop of the North American Lutheran Church
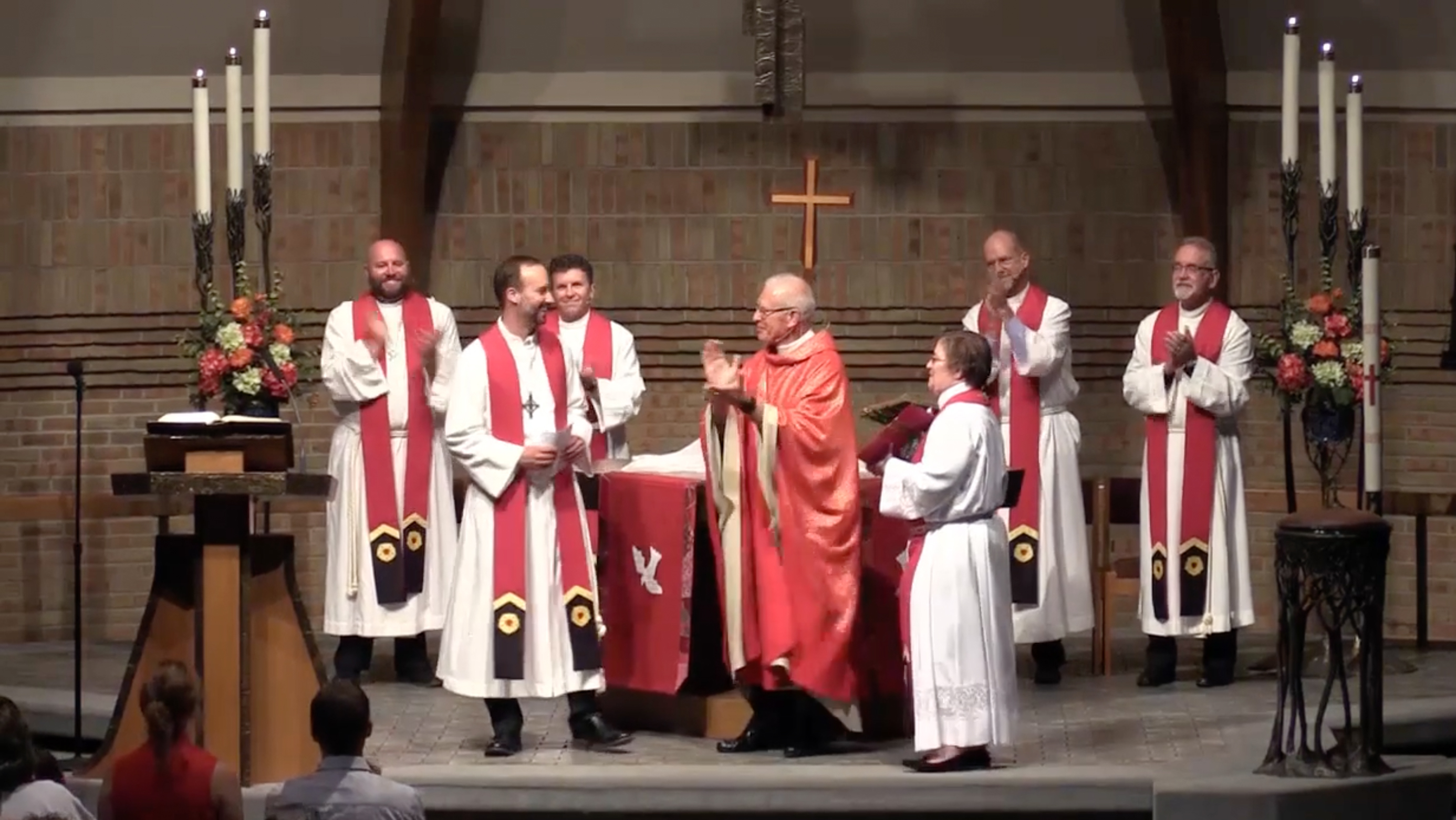
- Bishop John Bradosky presides over an ordination service at Upper Arlington Lutheran Church in Columbus, Ohio.
- Church: North American Lutheran Church
- In office: 2011-2019
- Previous posts: Pastor of Epiphany Lutheran Church (Dayton, Ohio); General Secretary of the NALC

Orders
- Ordination: 1979 ELCA
- Consecration: August 11, 2011 by Rev. Paull Spring (former Provisional Bishop of the NALC and former Bishop of the ELCA Northwestern Pennsylvania Synod), Rev. Ralph Kempski (former Bishop of the ELCA Indiana-Kentucky Synod), Rev. Henry Schulte (former Bishop of the ELCA Southwestern Texas Synod), Rev. Ron Warren (former Bishop of the ELCA Southeastern Synod), and Rev. Dr. Berhanu Ofga'a (General Secretary of the EECMY)

Personal details
- Born: May 3, 1952 (age 73) Greensburg, Pennsylvania

John F. Bradosky (born 1952) is an American Lutheran Bishop. He was the second Bishop (first Bishop to be elected) of the North American Lutheran Church, from his election on 11 August 2011 until his successor, the Rev. Dr. Dan Selbo, was elected as Bishop on 9 August 2019. He followed Rev. Paull Spring, who served as the NALC Provisional Bishop from its inception, and was the former Bishop of the ELCA Northwestern Pennsylvania Synod.

== Ecclesiastical career ==
Bradosky graduated from the Hamma School of Theology at Wittenberg University in Springfield, Ohio, and from Indiana University of Pennsylvania at Indiana, Pennsylvania.

He had 32 years of pastoral experience when he was elected the first Bishop of the NALC, having served in the Evangelical Lutheran Church in America. He was senior pastor of St. John Lutheran Church, in Springfield, Ohio, Trinity Lutheran Church, in Canton, Ohio, and Grace Lutheran Church, in Huntington Beach, California. He was the senior pastor of the Epiphany Lutheran Church, in Dayton, Ohio, when he joined the North American Lutheran Church upon its creation in June 2010. He was appointed General Secretary of the NALC in January 2011.

He was the first elected Bishop of the North American Lutheran Church at their Convocation, which reunited around 800 Lutherans at Upper Arlington Lutheran Church in Hilliard, Ohio, on 11 August 2011, to serve for a four-year term. His installation service was attended by the Rt. Rev. Ray Sutton (representing the Anglican Church in North America), the Rev. Dr. Joseph Small (representing the Presbyterian Church (USA)), as well as the Rev. Dr. Berhanu Ofga'a (representing the Ethiopian Evangelical Church Mekane Yesus). He was reelected for another four-year term at the NALC Convocation, on 13 August 2015. In August 2018, Bradosky announced that he would not seek reelection to another term. On 9 August 2019, the Rev. Dr. Dan Selbo was elected as Bradosky's successor.

== Personal life ==
Bradosky is married to Kristi and they had four children, one of whom died at the age of 6 years in a car accident.

== See also ==
- List of bishops of the North American Lutheran Church

Religious titles
Preceded by Paull Spring	Bishop of the North American Lutheran Church; 2011–2019	Succeeded by Dan Selbo
