= Saint Paul-Reformation Lutheran Church =

Church in Minnesota, U.S.

Coordinates: 44°56′41″N 93°8′37.5″W

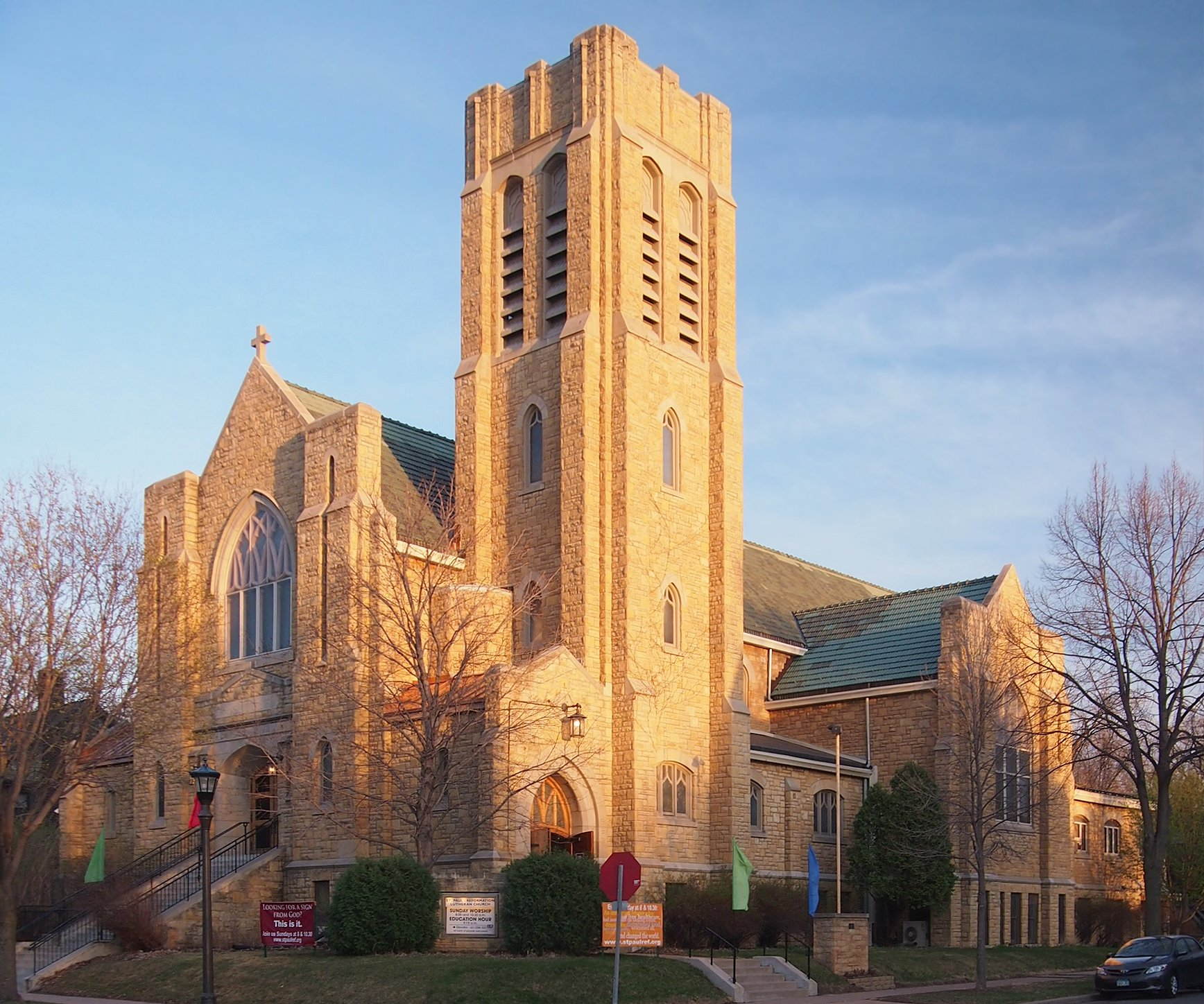
Saint Paul-Reformation Lutheran Church from the northwest

Saint Paul-Reformation Lutheran Church (SPR) is a congregation of the Evangelical Lutheran Church in America (ELCA) located in Saint Paul, Minnesota, United States. It is part of the Saint Paul Area Synod.

The congregation gained national attention in 2001 when it ordained Anita C. Hill (not to be confused with Anita Hill of the Clarence Thomas US Senate confirmation hearings). Hill is a lesbian in a committed relationship. Under ELCA guidelines at the time of her ordination, a candidate who "self-identifi[ed] as a homosexual is expected to refrain from sexual relations." The Saint Paul Area Synod, the local ecclesiastical authority, chose to "censure and admonish" the congregation for a period of time. The congregation continued to contribute the ELCA, attending Synodical gatherings and other meetings, and was formally reinstated to the roster of congregations when the policies of the ELCA were changed in 2009.

The congregation is also notable in that nearly 25% of its membership identifying as LGBT. Liturgy, preaching, and music continue to be exceptionally important to the parish as well as its continued ministries of social justice.
