= Canadian Association of Lutheran Congregations =

Lutheran Christian denomination in Canada

- Classification: Lutheran
- Moderator: Rev. James Bredeson
- Region: Canada
- Origin: 1992
- Separated from: Evangelical Lutheran Church in Canada
- Congregations: 33
- Official website: www.calc.ca

The Canadian Association of Lutheran Congregations (CALC) is a small Lutheran denomination in Canada, standing in between the more liberal Evangelical Lutheran Church in Canada and the more conservative Lutheran Church – Canada. It is one of only three all-Canadian Lutheran denominations as other Lutheran denominations with presence in Canada, the Wisconsin Evangelical Lutheran Synod and the North American Lutheran Church, are based primarily in the United States. It is the third largest Lutheran body in Canada, after the ELCIC and the LCC respectively.

== History ==
The CALC was founded in the early 1990s by a group of Lutherans within the Evangelical Lutheran Church in Canada (ELCIC) who were dissatisfied with the denomination's theological liberalism and increasing tolerance of homosexual relationships. It was formally incorporated by an act of Parliament in June 1994. It is today the third largest Lutheran denomination in Canada.

== Seminary ==
The official seminary of CALC is the Institute of Lutheran Theology (ILT), located in Brookings, South Dakota. In partnership with ILT, it trains all its pastors through a unique program called The Shepherd's Pathway.

== Membership ==
From a single congregation in 1992, CALC has grown to include 32 congregations in 5 Canadian provinces. (British Columbia, 6; Alberta, 16; Saskatchewan, 3; Manitoba, 1; Ontario, 6)

- British Columbia
  - Basel Hakka Lutheran Church, Vancouver
  - Grace Lutheran Church West Kelowna
  - Martin Luther Evangelical Lutheran Church, Vancouver
  - Mount Calvary Lutheran Church, Mission
  - St. Andrew's Lutheran Church, Kamloops
  - Vancouver Chinese Lutheran Church, Vancouver
- Alberta
  - Asker Lutheran Church, Ponoka
  - Bardo Lutheran Church, Tofield
  - Bethel Lutheran Church, Marwayne
  - Calvary Evangelical Lutheran Church, Wetaskiwin
  - Christ Lutheran Church, Sexsmith
  - Emmaus Lutheran Church, Edmonton
  - Faith Calgary, Calgary
  - Golden Valley Lutheran Church, Viking
  - Immanuel Lutheran Church of Rosenthal, Stony Plain
  - Journey's Lutheran Church, Grande Prairie
  - Peace Lutheran Church, Wainwright
  - Salem Lutheran Church, Kingman
  - Sharon Lutheran Church, Irma
  - St. Peter's Lutheran Church, Cochrane
  - Trondhjem Lutheran Church, Round Hill
  - Victory Lutheran Church, Medicine Hat
- Saskatchewan
  - Immanuel Lutheran Church, Parkside
  - St. John North Prairie Lutheran Church, Preeceville
  - Trinity Lutheran Church, Leader
- Manitoba
  - Christ Lutheran Church, Morden
- Ontario
  - All Saints Lutheran Church, Ottawa
  - Evangelical Lutheran Church of the Good Shepherd, Toronto
  - Faith Lutheran Church, North York
  - Goodwood Uxbridge Lutheran Church, Goodwood
  - Resurrection Lutheran Church, Pembroke
  - St. Peter's Lutheran Church, Sullivan
