= 2009 ELCA Churchwide Assembly =

The 2009 ELCA Churchwide Assembly was the eleventh biennial Churchwide Assembly of the Evangelical Lutheran Church in America. It convened in the city of Minneapolis, Minnesota, from August 17–23, 2009. The Churchwide Assembly is the 'highest legislative authority' of the ELCA.

At the time of the Assembly, the ELCA consisted of nearly 4.6 million members organized into nearly 11,000 congregations. The Assembly consisted of 1,045 voting members and was chaired by The Rev. Mark S. Hanson, Presiding Bishop of the ELCA from 2001 to 2013. David Swartling served as Secretary of the ELCA from 2007 to 2013.

The 2009 Assembly was dominated by debate on the proposed Social Statement, and its accompanying Recommendations for Ministry Policies. The Statement allowed for differing understandings of same-gender sexual relationships within the ELCA. The Recommendations proposed the development of a process in which congregations, synods, and churchwide units that chose to do so could call pastors and other officially recognized church leaders who were in publicly accountable same-gender lifelong monogamous relationships.

The assembly's agenda also included a proposed agreement of full communion between the ELCA and the United Methodist Church, the UMC's first such agreement, along with other business matters, including: the passage of the ELCA Churchwide organization's budget, elections of officers and committee members, reports from Churchwide units and greetings from ecumenical partners.

Nevertheless, "Human Sexuality: Gift and Trust" is the legacy of the 2009 Assembly. Its eventual adoption, with its recommendations, opened the way for people in same-sex relationships to serve as pastors and other rostered leaders in the ELCA. After its adoption, many congregations and pastors who believed that such relationships were contrary to Holy Scripture, the tradition of the Church, and the Lutheran Confessions left the ELCA. The 2009 ELCA Churchwide Assembly reshaped American Lutheranism.

== Human Sexuality: Gift and Trust ==
=== Process leading to the Social Statement ===
The conservative Judeo-Christian understanding is that sexual relationships between people of the same sex are not part of God's intention for humanity and are an expression of sinful human desire The Biblical texts which are most commonly interpreted as proscribing homosexual activity are Leviticus 18:22 and Romans 1:26–27. Conservative Jews and Christians see there being a divine intention for sexual intimacy between a man and a woman in Genesis 1:26–28 and Genesis 2:18–25.

Debates about human sexuality, specifically the legitimacy of homosexual sexual relationships for Christians, had been on the ELCA's agenda for almost two decades. 1990's 'Vision and Expectations,' the standards for ELCA pastors, stated 'Pastors who are homosexual in their self-understanding are expected to abstain from homosexual sexual relationships.' This statement reaffirmed the teaching statements of two of the predecessor bodies of the ELCA, the Lutheran Church in America and the American Lutheran Church.

In 1993, a draft Social Statement, "The Church and Human Sexuality: A Lutheran Perspective," which took a permissive view on same-sex relationships, was leaked to the press, resulting in many parishioners being upset with what was misunderstood as new ELCA policy and was withdrawn. In 1996, the ELCA Church Council adopted "Sexuality: Some Common Convictions," which articulated shared understandings of ELCA Lutherans regarding human sexuality.

The issue continued to simmer while full-communion agreements with the Presbyterian Church USA, Reformed Church in America, United Church of Christ, and Episcopal Church (United States) were debated and adopted in 1997 and 1999. As a response to the 1999 adoption of full communion with the ECUSA, a congregationally centered organization called Lutheran Congregations in Mission for Christ (LCMC) was formed in 2001 for congregations that did not agree with the decision.

Groups such as Lutherans Concerned/North America continued to advocate for full inclusion of LGBT persons in the life of the ELCA. In 2003, the Episcopal Church (United States) ordained an openly gay man in a same-sex relationship, the Rev. Canon Gene Robinson, as Bishop of New Hampshire.

By a 581–386 vote, the 2001 Churchwide Assembly acted "to initiate a process in the Evangelical Lutheran Church in America to develop a social statement on human sexuality." Over the next two years, a Task Force on Human Sexuality developed resources for study in the ELCA. Over 28,000 responses were received to the study documents, The Task Force put forth three recommendations to the 2005 Churchwide Assembly. The third recommendation would have retained the current ministry standards 'on the books,' but allowed congregations the discretion to call leaders in same-sex relationships 'for the sake of mission.' This recommendation of the Task Force, which would have required a two-thirds majority to pass, failed at the 2005 Churchwide Assembly, 490–503. A renewal group, Lutheran CORE, organized to advocate defeat of the recommendations.

At the 2007 Churchwide Assembly, many memorials from ELCA synods urged the Assembly to open the way for LGBT persons to serve as leaders in the ELCA. These memorials were debated but ultimately defeated. However, the Assembly adopted a resolution for the Task Force to make specific recommendations regarding ministry standards to go with the 2009 Social Statement, and also adopted a resolution to encourage restraint in discipline of those congregations and pastors who were not abiding by the ministry standards. These resolutions set the stage for change at the 2009 Assembly.

=== Social Statement ===
In the ELCA, Social Statements "are teaching documents that assist members in their thinking about social issues. They are meant to aid in communal and individual moral formation and deliberation. Social statements also set policy for this church and guide its advocacy and work in the public arena."

In 2008, the Task Force on Human Sexuality released a draft of "Human Sexuality: Gift and Trust." As eventually adopted, the Statement claims a 'distinctly Lutheran approach,' building on Lutheran principles of justification by grace and Christian freedom to serve the neighbor. It emphasizes that central to human vocation, in relation to human sexuality, is the building and protection of trust in relationships. It affirmed that human beings are called to be trustworthy in the exercise of human sexuality and to build social institutions and practices in which trust and trustworthy relationships can thrive.

Regarding marriage, the adopted Statement recognizes that 'The historic Christian tradition and the Lutheran Confessions have recognized marriage as a covenant between a man and a woman.' Nonetheless, the statement continues, "Recognizing that this conclusion differs from the historic Christian tradition and the Lutheran Confessions, some people, though not all, in this church and within the larger Christian community, conclude that marriage is also the appropriate term to use in describing similar benefits, protection, and support for same-gender couples entering into lifelong, monogamous relationships. They believe that such accountable relationships also provide the necessary foundation that supports trust and familial and community thriving."

Recognizing the lack of consensus within the ELCA, the Statement opens the way for congregations to publicly recognize same-sex relationships and LGBT persons to serve as pastors and other leaders by appealing to a theological concept of 'bound conscience'. The concept recalls Martin Luther's statement at the Diet of Worms: 'it is neither safe nor right to go against conscience.' The Statement recognizes that members of the ELCA are bound by conscience to differing understandings of the legitimacy and desirability of same-sex sexual relationships in Christian life. Those different understandings may be lived out within the Church, and the differing opinions need not be church-dividing. Instead of having a definitive teaching regarding homosexual practice, the ELCA recognizes a varied but limited range of opinions on the matter, and leaves the decision to Christian freedom and the individual Christian, with all members of the ELCA respecting the other's bound consciences.

The Ministry Recommendations appealed to the bound consciences of believers with regard to same-sex relationships. Congregations, synods, and churchwide units that chose to do so would be permitted to recognize and celebrate such relationships and call leaders either in such relationships or seeking such relationships. Persons or congregations would also be free to understand same-sex activity as sinful, to refuse to bless them, and to refuse to call leaders in same-sex relationships.

Two dissenting positions were attached to the Statement and Recommendations. Dissenting Position One urged retention of the existing ministry standards proscribing homosexual practice. Dissenting Position Two argued for a more unequivocal statement of full inclusion for LGBT persons in the life of the ELCA.

In the months and weeks leading to the Assembly, the Statement and Recommendations were discussed and debated by theologians, seminary professors, pastors, ethicists, and advocacy groups, and debated in Synod Assemblies. The July 2009 online issue of Journal of Lutheran Ethics was devoted to discussion of the Ministry Policies.

=== Debate and Adoption of Statement and Recommendations ===
The Assembly opened on the evening of Monday, August 17, with a strong media presence. Advocacy groups from all over the nation were present, including Soulforce and representatives from the Westboro Baptist Church. Lutheran CORE and Goodsoil, a group of Lutherans Concerned/North America, represented the two key ELCA advocacy groups.

The Assembly began with a fierce debate on the adoption of the Rules of Procedure which would be key to the events that followed. Although a two-thirds vote on a Social Statement is necessary for passage, passage of the Social Statement alone would not have changed ministry standards. Therefore, the debate was over whether a two-thirds majority would be required for both the Statement and Recommendations, or for the Statement alone. The Rules eventually adopted required a simple majority for the Recommendations if the Statement passed. This was a defeat for Lutheran CORE, which had argued strenuously against a simple majority deciding a matter of such importance. However, some who supported the recommendations also desired a 2/3 majority, for the sake of the unity of the ELCA.

Debate on the Statement and Recommendations was reported to be generally respectful. Those in favor urged adoption for some of the following reasons:

- the willingness of Jesus and the apostles to change or ignore Old Testament laws;
- the tradition of Reformation in the Lutheran Church;
- the willingness of ELCA predecessor bodies to ordain women, seemingly in contravention of Scripture;
- the Church's rejection of Scripture's apparent justification of slavery;
- the ongoing work of the Spirit in the life of the Church;
- the personal experiences of voting members with faithful pastors, family members, and friends who were LGBT and had suffered from persecution;
- the younger generations' growing acceptance of homosexuality and the effect it might have on the ELCA if such a change were rejected, and
- the patience of LGBT persons in waiting for overdue justice and full acceptance, and the deleterious effects on their spiritual lives.

Those against urged defeat for some of the following reasons:

- the lack of Scriptural support for same-sex sexual relations, and the locus of the Spirit's inspiration from Scripture and not from human experience;
- a lack of consensus in the Assembly, ELCA, and the wider Church regarding a novel interpretation of Scripture;
- the Reformation tradition of Scripture, not conscience, as the judge and norm of doctrine, acknowledged in the ELCA constitution;
- the difference between the uses and misuses of Scripture in debates regarding slavery, women's ordination, and homosexual practice;
- on adoption, the lack of clear, consistent teaching in the ELCA regarding the legitimacy of homosexual practice;
- lack of representation of the opinions of most ELCA members at the Assembly;
- on adoption, the effective division of the ELCA's ordained ministry;
- on adoption, the negative effect on immigrant ELCA Lutheran communities with conservative views on sexuality;
- on adoption, a negative effect on nationwide and worldwide inter-Lutheran relationships and ecumenical relationships with some other Churches;
- on adoption, the possibility of a schism within the ELCA, especially in light of similar changes and reactions in the Episcopal Church.

On Wednesday, August 19, the Assembly adopted the Social Statement as amended by a vote of 676-338: precisely the two-thirds majority needed for passage. On Thursday, August 20, the assembly also adopted 15 implementing resolutions by a vote of 695–285.

Among the implementing resolutions were resolutions that: asked the Presiding Bishop's office to explore the feasibility of developing liturgical rites for use at the time of divorce; affirmed the 2001 ELCA Message "Commercial Sexual Exploitation," and called upon churchwide units to implement the statement and report to the Church Council by 2012.

From Thursday, August 20, to Friday, August 21, voting members debated and adopted the four resolutions proposed by the Church Council based on those contained in the "Report and Recommendation on Ministry Policies." The assembly adopted the resolutions in the following order:

- Resolution 3: Adopted by a vote of 771-230 as amended: "Resolved, that in the implementation of any resolutions on ministry policies, the ELCA commit itself to bear one another's burdens, love the neighbor, and respect the bound consciences of all."
- Resolution 1: Adopted by a vote of 619-402: "Resolved, that the ELCA commit itself to finding ways to allow congregations that choose to do so to recognize, support and hold publicly accountable lifelong, monogamous, same-gender relationships."
- Resolution 2: Adopted by a vote of 559-451: "Resolved, that the ELCA commit itself to finding a way for people in such publicly accountable, lifelong, monogamous, same-gender relationships to serve as rostered leaders of this church."
- Resolution 4: Adopted by a vote of 667-307 as amended: This resolution called upon members to respect the bound consciences of those with whom they disagree; declared the intent to allow structured flexibility in decision-making about candidacy and the call process; eliminated the prohibition of rostered service by members in publicly accountable, lifelong, monogamous same-gender relationships; recognized and committed to respect the conviction of members who believe that the ELCA should not call or roster people in committed same-gender relationships; called for development of accountability guidelines; directed that appropriate amendments to ministry policy documents be drafted and approved by the Church Council; and urged that this church continue to trust congregations, bishops, synods and others responsible for determining who should be called into public ministry.

Resolutions 1 and 2 passed by less than a 2/3 majority. Therefore, had the Rules of Procedure been adopted to require a 2/3 majority for the Recommendations, the standards for ministry would have remained the same regardless of the adoption of the Social Statement.

== Full Communion with the United Methodist Church ==
Full communion is not a church merger, but rather "when two churches develop a relationship based on a common confessing of the Christian faith and a mutual recognition of baptism and sharing of the Lord's Supper...In reaching agreements, churches also respect differences. These denominations likewise jointly worship, may exchange clergy, and also share a commitment to evangelism, witness and service in the world."

The ELCA had previously entered into five full communion agreements: with Reformed church bodies (PCUSA, UCC, RCA) in 1997; and with the Episcopal Church, U.S.A. in 1999 and the Moravian Church in North America in 1999. Of those full communion agreements, the one with the ECUSA was the most controversial, as a condition of that agreement was the inclusion of future Lutheran bishops and clergy into the Episcopalian apostolic succession. This agreement was seen by some Lutherans as violating the Lutheran Confessions and spurred the creation of LCMC.

The UMC approved the full communion agreement in 2008; it was the UMC's first such agreement. Although some debate occurred, the adoption of the agreement was not nearly as controversial as the agreements of 1997 and 1999, passing by a vote of 958–24.

== Other actions ==
Carlos Peña was re-elected to a second term as vice-president of the ELCA. The church adopted an HIV/AIDS funding proposal, and the Assembly approved the Lutheran Malaria Initiative. By a vote of 754–176, the Assembly requested the development of a Social Statement on justice for women in church and society to be brought before the 2015 Assembly.

== August 19th tornado event ==
On August 19, disturbances in the jet stream caused severe thunderstorms to form in Iowa and the Dakotas. The storms moved to the north and east during the day, spreading into Wisconsin and Minnesota. At 1:50 pm CDT, an EF0 tornado touched down in south Minneapolis, Minnesota, uprooting trees and causing minor structural damage to buildings, including Minneapolis' neo-Gothic-styled Central Lutheran Church. The tornado continued north-northwest for 4.5 miles (7 km) before dissipating near the Minneapolis Convention Center in downtown Minneapolis where the Churchwide Assembly was being held.

The timing of this tornado with the day of the 2009 ELCA Churchwide Assembly's vote on the Social Statement "Human Sexuality: Gift and Trust" sparked an increased interest in the Assembly across social media, local print and broadcast news, the religious blogosphere, and a few national-level media outlets including the magazine Christianity Today and a blog by the religion editor of The Washington Times. While this was the first significant tornado to strike the city of Minneapolis since June 14, 1981, ten additional tornadoes also touched down that day in eastern Minnesota and western Wisconsin.

== After the 2009 Churchwide Assembly ==
=== In the ELCA ===
While some believed that the Statement did not go far enough in its support for sexual minorities, the adoption of the Statement and Recommendations was hailed by many within the ELCA as a long-overdue redress of justice for LGBT Christians. In 2010, many pastors who had been removed from their positions were reinstated, including Anita C. Hill and Bradley Schmeling. The way was opened for LGBT persons to enter candidacy for ministry. 'Vision and Expectations' was revised to allow for people in publicly accountable, lifelong, monogamous, same-sex relationships.

Lutherans Concerned/North America and Goodsoil continue to advocate for full inclusion of LGBT people in the life of the ELCA. The 2011 Churchwide Assembly passed an 'anti-bullying' memorial which was supported by Goodsoil and passed in many ELCA Synods.

Also in 2011, Presiding Bishop Mark S. Hanson participated in the 'It Gets Better' campaign, recording a YouTube video and contributing to the book. The ELCA Youth Ministry page also linked to the "It Gets Better" campaign and The Trevor Project.

In matters unrelated to "Human Sexuality: Gift and Trust," the 2011 ELCA Churchwide Assembly adopted the ELCA Malaria Initiative, pulling out of the shared relationship with Lutheran World Relief, the Lutheran Church – Missouri Synod, and the United Nations. It also took action to put further social statements on hold until a review of the process for social statements is sent before the 2012 Church Council, and after 2013, Churchwide Assemblies will be held every three years instead of every two. While work continues on the Justice for Women Social Statement, it will not come before an Assembly until at least 2016.

Those who opposed the Statement's adoption responded in many different ways. After the 2009 Assembly, several hundred pastors and congregations left the ELCA for new and existing Lutheran church bodies. Other pastors and congregations remained in the ELCA but in various degrees of tension with the current situation.

Many congregations who were voting to leave the ELCA affiliated with Lutheran Congregations in Mission for Christ (LCMC) or other smaller Lutheran 'micro-synods.' Other congregations desired to be part of a church body with more accountability and less congregationally based. In response, Lutheran CORE proposed a new church body, the North American Lutheran Church (NALC), for congregations that had left or were planning to leave the ELCA, while continuing Lutheran CORE as a 'community of confessing Lutherans' across judicatorial lines.

The constituting convention of the NALC was held in Grove City, Ohio, in August 2010. The Rev. Paull Spring, a former ELCA synodical Bishop, was elected Bishop for a provisional one-year term. In September, 2011, The Rev. John Bradosky was elected to a four-year term as Bishop. As of September 2012, the NALC has more than 125,000 baptized members in over 300 congregations across North America. As of October 2010 LCMC has over 550 congregations with 500 in the United States.

At the 2011 ELCA Churchwide Assembly, it was reported that in 2010, the ELCA had a net membership loss of 270,349, or 5.95% of its baptized membership, and a net loss of 340 congregations. From the years 2000 to 2010, the baptized membership of the ELCA had decreased from 5,125,919 to 4,272,688, and the number of congregations decreased from 10,816 to 10,008. Most mainline Protestant denominations have decreased in numbers in the past half-century.

=== Inter-Lutheran Reaction ===
Other Lutheran denominations, such as the Lutheran Church–Missouri Synod(LCMS), the Wisconsin Evangelical Lutheran Synod (WELS), the Lutheran Church Canada (LCC), and the Evangelical Lutheran Synod (ELS), expressed serious disagreement with the passage of "Human Sexuality: Gift and Trust."

The Lutheran Church–Missouri Synod retreated further from its already limited cooperation with the ELCA. In July 2011, LCMS President Matthew C. Harrison announced the end of cooperative ministry, including cooperative training, between ELCA and LCMS military chaplains, beginning in 2012. President Harrison wrote, "Today, like two ships at sea sailing apart on different compass headings, the ELCA and the LCMS have lost sight of each other," also citing the decision of the ELCA and ECUSA to pursue cooperative training for their chaplains. The cooperative ministry had been in existence between the LCMS and the ELCA's predecessor bodies since May 1941.

In October 2009, the board of one of the ELCA's partner churches, the board of the Evangelical Mekane Yesus Fellowship in North America, voted to declare disunity with the ELCA. An announcement stated the board was no longer "in good conscience able to commune and partner with ELCA Church that has willfully disobeyed the word of God and regrettably departed from the clear instructions of the Holy Scriptures," since the Word of God "declares marriage is only between a man and a woman."
