= List of ELCA colleges and universities =

This is a list of Evangelical Lutheran Church in America colleges and universities:

- Augsburg University (Minneapolis, Minnesota)
- Augustana College (Rock Island, Illinois)
- Augustana University (Sioux Falls, South Dakota)
- Bethany College (Lindsborg, Kansas)
- California Lutheran University (Thousand Oaks, California)
- Capital University (Bexley, Ohio)
- Carthage College (Kenosha, Wisconsin)
- Concordia College (Moorhead, Minnesota)
- Gettysburg College (Gettysburg, Pennsylvania)
- Grand View University (Des Moines, Iowa)
- Gustavus Adolphus College (St. Peter, Minnesota)
- Lenoir–Rhyne University (Hickory, North Carolina)
- Luther College (Decorah, Iowa)
- Midland University (Fremont, Nebraska)
- Muhlenberg College (Allentown, Pennsylvania)
- Newberry College (Newberry, South Carolina)
- Pacific Lutheran University (Parkland, Washington)
- Roanoke College (Salem, Virginia)
- St. Olaf College (Northfield, Minnesota)
- Susquehanna University (Selinsgrove, Pennsylvania)
- Texas Lutheran University (Seguin, Texas)
- Thiel College (Greenville, Pennsylvania)
- Wagner College (Staten Island, New York)
- Wartburg College (Waverly, Iowa)
- Wittenberg University (Springfield, Ohio)

== Former or defunct colleges ==
- Dana College (Blair, Nebraska), closed in 2010
- Finlandia University (Hancock, Michigan), closed in 2023
- Upsala College (East Orange, New Jersey), closed in 1995
- Waldorf University (Forest City, Iowa), sold to Columbia Southern University in 2010 and was renamed from Waldorf College in 2016

== See also ==
- List of Lutheran colleges and universities in the United States
