= Solid Rock Lutherans =

Minnesota-based group of Lutheran clergy

Solid Rock Lutherans was a Minnesota-based group of Lutheran clergy and laity within the Evangelical Lutheran Church in America (ELCA) who opposed liberalizing that church's position on the ordination of non-celibate gay and lesbian persons on the basis of scriptural authority.

Reverend Roy Harrisville III, a pastor from Minneapolis, served as the group's executive director.

== Beliefs ==
The group's mission was "To call the Evangelical Lutheran Church in America to remain faithful to the Word of God according to the Lutheran Confessions". Furthermore, they stated that they were "dedicated to upholding the current biblical and confessional standards on sexual conduct and ordination". The group opposed same-sex marriage.

The group did support the ordination of gay and lesbian clergy, as long as they practiced celibacy.

== Activity ==
The Solid Rock Lutherans were formed in 2003.

=== 2005 ELCA Churchwide Assembly ===
In April 2005, a denominational task force released a set of proposals to be voted on at the 2005 ELCA Churchwide Assembly later that year, all of which the Solid Rock Lutherans opposed. These proposals upheld the prohibition on ordaining sexually active gay and lesbian clergy, but would allow synods to make exceptions in certain cases, such as if the individual was in a long-term committed relationship. Additionally, the proposals upheld the prohibition on blessing same-sex unions but gave clergy "discretion in deciding how to minister to gay couples". Harrisville spoke out against the proposals prior to the conference.

At the assembly, held in August, the Solid Rock Lutherans joined with the Word Alone Network in opposing the proposals, arguing that the changes would prevent the church from imposing either prohibition. Harrisville stated he thought there was no scriptural justification or "spirit in the church" to justify changing the current ELCA standards at the time.

The proposals were ultimately voted down or revised so as not to refer to gay couples at all. Having stated that it achieved its goal in the 2005 ELCA Churchwide Assembly, Solid Rock Lutherans ceased operations in November 2005.

=== Activity post 2005 ===
Members of Solid Rock Lutherans created Lutheran CORE ("Lutheran Coalition for Reform") in 2005 and attempted to influence the 2007 and 2009 ELCA Churchwide Assembly. When attempts at reform failed in 2009, Lutheran CORE changed its name in 2010 to "Lutheran Coalition for Renewal," and continues to be a support base for confessional Lutherans in any denomination.

Responding to a call for a formal church body in the confessional Lutheran tradition, Lutheran CORE members also formed the North American Lutheran Church.
