= Global Confessional and Missional Lutheran Forum =

Global religious gathering

The Global Confessional & Missional Lutheran Forum
- Type: Gathering
- Classification: Protestant
- Orientation: Lutheran
- Scripture: Protestant Bible
- Headquarters: Bishoftu, Ethiopia
- Origin: 2015
- Members: 18,840,586
- Official website: www.globalforum.co

The Global Confessional & Missional Lutheran Forum (Global Forum) is a global gathering of national and regional Lutheran churches. The forum was founded in Dallas, Texas by invitation of the North American Lutheran Church in 2015 to bring together Confessional Lutheran bodies who wish to emphasize missional discipleship as the focal point of ministry in the world. The gathering can be seen as an alternative to the more liberal Lutheran World Federation and to the more conservative International Lutheran Council and Confessional Evangelical Lutheran Conference.

In 2018, the Global Forum was hosted in Bishoftu, Ethiopia by the Ethiopian Evangelical Church Mekane Yesus. 43 leaders representing Lutheran bodies and organizations in 15 nations participated.

== Members & Signatories ==
Global Forum members and/or Bishoftu Letter signatories by country in 2018

Sorted by country in alphabetical order

- Bolivia

Christian Evangelical Lutheran Church of Bolivia

- Canada

Lutheran CORE
North American Lutheran Church
World Mission Prayer League

- Denmark

Evangelical Lutheran Network
Danish Bible Institute
Lutheran Mission

- Ethiopia

Ethiopian Evangelical Church Mekane Yesus

- Germany

Church Coalition for the Bible and Confession
International Christian Network

- India

Christu Suda Communications and Ministries

- Indonesia

Indonesian Lutheran Christian Church

- Kenya

Evangelical Lutheran Church in Kenya

- Mongolia

Mongolian Evangelical Lutheran Church

- Norway

Norwegian Lutheran Mission
Inner Mission Federation
NLA University College

- Peru

Evangelical Lutheran Church - Peru

- South Sudan

Lutheran Church of South Sudan

- Sweden

Mission Province

- Tanzania

Evangelical Lutheran Church in Tanzania

- United States of America

Lutheran CORE
North American Lutheran Church
World Mission Prayer League

== See also ==
- List of Lutheran denominations
- Porvoo Communion
