= North American Lutheran Seminary =

Coordinates: 40.593605°N 80.229968°W

- Type: Seminary network
- Established: 2014
- Affiliations: North American Lutheran Church
- President: The Rev. Dr. Jukka Kääriäinen
- Location: Ambridge, Pennsylvania, United States
- Campus: Small town
- Website: thenals.org

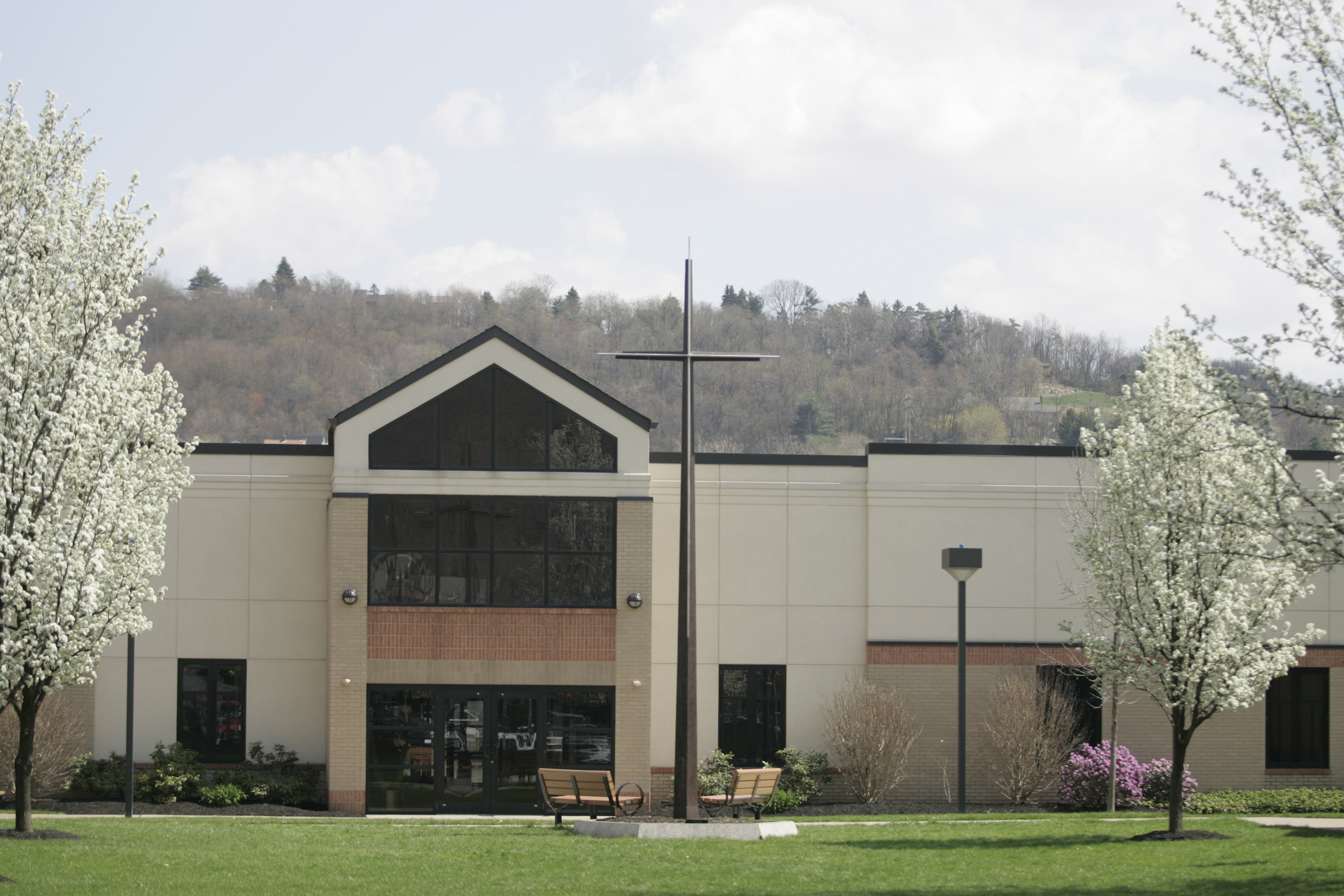
The North American Lutheran Seminary's seminary center is located at Trinity Anglican Seminary (formerly Trinity School for Ministry) in Ambridge, Pennsylvania.

The North American Lutheran Seminary (NALS) is the seminary network of the North American Lutheran Church (NALC). It was authorized by the NALC in 2013 following the work of a theological education task force, and was officially formed in 2014 with an elected Board of Regents to provide oversight. The NALS describes its model as a network centered at a seminary center in Ambridge, Pennsylvania, with partner seminaries serving as regional campuses.

== History ==
When the NALC was organized (2010), candidates for ministry were encouraged to attend seminaries of their choice; by 2012 the NALC established a task force on theological education to consider a dedicated seminary structure for NALC pastoral formation. In August 2013, the NALC approved a proposal to establish the North American Lutheran Seminary as a network model (rather than a new freestanding campus) with a seminary center and additional “houses of studies.” The seminary center was placed at Trinity Anglican Seminary in Ambridge, Pennsylvania, near Pittsburgh.

The Rev. Dr. Amy C. Schifrin STS was appointed as the first president; she served until her retirement in 2020. The Rev. Dr. Eric M. Riesen was appointed president in January 2020. In June 2025, the Rev. Dr. Jukka Kääriäinen began serving as president of NALS.

== Organization ==
The NALS operates as a “hub-and-spokes” network. The seminary center (the “hub”) is located at Trinity Anglican Seminary in Ambridge, Pennsylvania, with partner seminaries serving as regional campuses (“spokes”). As of 2026, the NALS publicly identifies four network schools:

- Trinity Anglican Seminary (Ambridge, Pennsylvania) – seminary center and administrative hub
- Gordon–Conwell Theological Seminary, Charlotte campus (Charlotte, North Carolina)
- Beeson Divinity School at Samford University (Birmingham, Alabama)
- Fuller Theological Seminary (Pasadena, California and Houston)

The NALS is governed by a Board of Regents and is responsible to the NALC’s Executive Council and bishop, with oversight described in NALS standards documents for theological education and pastoral formation.

== Academic programs and formation ==
NALS students pursue degree programs through the network’s partner seminaries, while completing NALS-specific requirements (including required courses and shared formation experiences) coordinated through the seminary center. The NALS standards documents describe required residential “June Intensive” sessions for NALC candidates for ordination (two one-week sessions), intended to support common formation across the network. The network’s partner schools include institutions accredited by the Association of Theological Schools in the United States and Canada (ATS).

== Seminary center and residential life ==
In the mid-2020s, the NALS developed the “Bonhoeffer House,” described by NALS as a residential community and formation space associated with the seminary center in Ambridge.

== Publications and media ==
The NALC describes Word & Sacrament as the official magazine of the North American Lutheran Seminary, published twice each year. The NALC also describes Cardigan & Collar as the official NALS podcast.
