= Lutheran CORE =

Lutheran community

- Formation: 2005
- Type: religious non-profit
- Location: United States
- Website: Lutheran CORE website

Lutheran CORE, or Coalition for Renewal, is a community of confessing Lutherans spanning several Lutheran church bodies, such as the Evangelical Lutheran Church in America, the Lutheran Congregations in Mission for Christ and the North American Lutheran Church. It ultimately led to the formation of the North American Lutheran Church, a denomination consisting mostly of congregations who broke away from the Evangelical Lutheran Church in America and the Evangelical Lutheran Church in Canada. It is a member of the Global Confessional and Missional Lutheran Forum.

== History ==
Lutheran CORE was formed in 2005 as the Lutheran Coalition for Reform. Its efforts were focused on working for reform of the Evangelical Lutheran Church in America. It was influenced by and has connections to WordAlone, a coalition of groups that focused on responding to and opposing changes in church polity, and statements and teachings on marriage and human sexuality. Lutheran CORE focused on several areas where it opposed changes in ELCA teaching. Those areas are outline in a statement of faith called The Common Confession.

Following decisions by the ELCA Churchwide Assembly in August 2009 to adopt a social statement on human sexuality that legitimize homosexual relationships and to allow pastors to be in committed same-sex relationships, Lutheran CORE changed its name and focus to Lutheran Coalition for Renewal. The organization no longer focuses on reform of the ELCA but rather on providing an alternate form for church fellowship for Lutherans regardless of church body affiliation.

Lutheran CORE's 2009 Convocation, held on September 25–26 in Fishers, Indiana, asked that a proposal for the "reconfiguration of North American Lutheranism" be prepared and brought to the 2010 Convocation. In November 2009, it was announced that a new church body would be formed, the North American Lutheran Church. The official document "A Vision and Plan for The North American Lutheran Church and Lutheran CORE, a Community of Confessing Lutherans" was released February 18, 2010. Lutheran CORE's 2010 Convocation, on August 26–27 in Grove City, Ohio, approved the formation of a new church body, the North American Lutheran Church, and the continuation of Lutheran CORE as a community of confessing Lutherans regardless of church body affiliation.

The North American Lutheran Church and Lutheran CORE, through their Joint Commission an Theology and Doctrine, approved an official anti-abortion stance in the document "The Lord Is with You" – A Word of Counsel to the Church – The Sanctity of Nascent Life", on December 14, 2012.

== See also ==
- ReconcilingWorks
