= Bible correspondence course =

Bible correspondence courses are lessons on the Bible which are sent to students through mailing systems such as mail and email by church-related organizations. These lessons usually teach through the Bible (particularly the New Testament) and through core doctrines of the Church using reading plans and study guides.

== Programs ==
Lessons can be brief surveys of the Bible or an in-depth historical study of the Old Testament Hebrew and New Testament Greek. Some denominations that have been proponents of the programs include Baptist, Lutheran, Orthodox, Catholic, and Non-denominational.

Lessons can vary in form of Bible translation ranging from the King James Version and New King James to the New American Standard Bible and New International Version. When a student completes a study guide, the correspondence course provider corrects the study guide and sends the next lesson. These lessons are unaccredited and provided for free or for a low fee. This makes the courses available to low income students and inmates. These lessons also come in multiple languages such as Spanish, Tagalog, and Portuguese. After completing the course, the student is formally awarded a Certificate of Completion which commonly comes with special privileges within the organization.
