= Redeemed Zoomer =

American Presbyterian YouTuber and activist

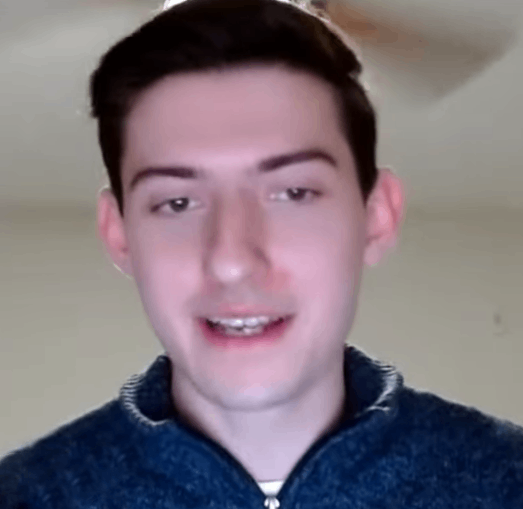
- Ackerman in 2025
- Born: Richard Ackerman; December 17, 2002 (age 23); New York, US
- Education: Southern Methodist University (BA, BS)
- Spouse: Anna Marburger (m. 2024)

Instagram information
- Page: redeemed_zoomer
- Years active: 2021–present
- Followers: 60.3 thousand

X information
- Handle: @redeemed_zoomer
- Years active: 2022–present
- Followers: 39.4 thousand

YouTube information
- Channel: Redeemed Zoomer
- Years active: 2020–present
- Subscribers: 724 thousand
- Views: 128 million
- Redeemed Zoomer's voice (2025) Ackerman's opening statement during a debate on the compatibility of Christianity and evolution.
- Last updated: November 10, 2026
- Website: redeemedzoomer.com

Richard Ackerman (born December 17, 2002), known online as Redeemed Zoomer, is an American Presbyterian activist and YouTuber. He founded Operation Reformation (formerly known as Operation Reconquista) in 2023 and operates the Redeemed Zoomer YouTube channel, which has over 724,000 subscribers.

== YouTube channel ==
Ackerman produced content across three YouTube channels and an Instagram account before achieving viral success with Redeemed Zoomer in 2022. His early content was created in his dorm room, often late at night. Ackerman also produces gameplay commentary videos, which feature him playing Minecraft while discussing topics such as theology and church history. He additionally hosts weekly or semi-weekly livestreams on YouTube in which he interacts with viewers.

Much of Ackerman's content concerns Christian theology, denominational differences, and church history. He is primarily known for Microsoft Paint–style explainer videos, characterized by his use of the Comic Sans font.

== Operation Reformation ==
Ackerman is the founder of Operation Reformation, a Confessing Movement organization aimed at preserving theologically conservative congregations within mainline Protestant denominations, with the goal of restoring them to theological conservatism, rather than founding more conservative splinter groups. The organization was originally founded as "Operation Reconquista," a name that is shared with the historic Reconquista. The group's website uses militant language and imagery, though they believe that violence is not needed for their goals. As part of the efforts of Operation Reformation, Ackerman also co-founded the Presbyterians for the Kingdom, a nonprofit organization seeking to advance theological conservatism in the Presbyterian Church (USA). The organization has sent representatives to the General Assembly of the PCUSA.
