= WordAlone =

WordAlone is a network of congregations and individuals originating within the Evangelical Lutheran Church in America (ELCA), the largest Lutheran denomination in the United States. Some congregations are still members of the denomination, but many churches have left and or joined other denominations such as Lutheran Congregations in Mission for Christ. According to its website, WordAlone advocates reform and renewal of the church, representative governance, theological integrity, and freedom from a mandated historic episcopate. The group is generally considered theologically and socially conservative. As of 2005, approximately 215 congregations have officially joined the organization.

== History ==
The group began as an electronic-mail discussion group in 1996. Its members coalesced in opposition to changes in ELCA ordination practices that were required as part of the proposed Concordat of Agreement with the Episcopal Church (United States) (ECUSA). The changes would have required that new pastors be ordained only by bishops, reflecting the ECUSA's understanding of apostolic succession, as a pre-condition to the sharing of ministers between the two church bodies. Citing Article Seven of the Augsburg Confession, which declares it unnecessary "that human traditions, rites, or ceremonies instituted by human beings be alike everywhere," the individuals who would later form the WordAlone Network argued that the restrictions on ordination ran counter to traditional Lutheran understandings of the ministry. Some of the animus against ECUSA derived in part from the general dominance of theological liberalism within Anglicanism, abhorrent to many who consider the Augsburg Confession and the other writings in the Book of Concord to be definitive of proper Christian belief and practice.

They met at a conference in Mahtomedi, Minnesota, and offered an alternative proposal in March 1997. Passage of the Concordat would have required a two-thirds supermajority of over 1000 "voting members" of the assembly. Due to the efforts of opponents, the Concordat of Agreement was defeated at the ELCA's churchwide assembly in August 1997 by only six votes.

In preparation for the 1999 churchwide assembly, the ELCA and ECUSA had developed a new version of the proposed fellowship agreement, this time dubbed Called to Common Mission. While the document claimed to address Lutheran concerns, it was sufficiently similar that the ECUSA declared that its original vote in favor of the Concordat would count as the first of two required votes at successive general conventions to affirm Called to Common Mission. In spite of an organized effort, Called to Common Mission passed by 27 votes in the churchwide assembly.

Up to this time, WordAlone had been almost exclusively a grassroots movement working through a website and a listserve. The individual leaders then called for "WordAlone Regional Meetings" around the country to meet and send delegates to a national meeting in November in Roseville, Minnesota. The assembled delegates voted to meet again to form the WordAlone Network in March 2000, and the organization has been active since.

In a small concession to WordAlone supporters, the ELCA assembly in 2001 did enact an amendment to church bylaws to allow for pastors, rather than bishops, to preside at ordinations in "unusual circumstances," a method that has been used 17 times as of 2005. WordAlone has viewed these "unusual" ordinations as small victories, although they have provoked irritation from some in the ECUSA who see the practice as reflecting a lack of commitment to the Called to Common Mission agreement.

== Reform efforts ==
Among other campaigns, WordAlone seeks to pare back what it sees as a top-heavy administrative structure in the ELCA, returning much authority to congregations and freeing up funds for more aggressive mission work. This is in general keeping with conservative renewal movements in other mainline denominations, reflecting an anti-bureaucratic posture against what it believes to be the source of errant teaching and ethics.

More recently, WordAlone has turned its attention to the issue of sexuality in the church. The ELCA has officially welcomed homosexuals within its congregations since 1991, but it has struggled in recent years over whether non-celibate homosexuals in stable relationships should be ordained as ministers and whether ministers should be permitted to bless same-sex partnerships. Groups such as Lutherans Concerned/North America are presently advocating for such ordinations and blessings. Groups such as WordAlone advocate a traditional understanding of marriage, sexuality and sexual orientation.

Perhaps more controversially, WordAlone also started a body called Lutheran Congregations in Mission for Christ (LCMC) which is now legally and organizationally separate from WordAlone though there is some cooperation between the two. LCMC provides organizational resources for congregations that are dissatisfied with the ELCA leadership. Churches that join may either remain members of the ELCA or other Lutheran denominations or may sever such ties and claim the LCMC as their only denominational affiliation. The LCMC describes itself as a "centrist" Lutheran organization and permits the ordination of women. This sets the LCMC apart the Lutheran Church–Missouri Synod and the Wisconsin Evangelical Lutheran Synod, the two major confessionalist Lutheran bodies in the U.S. In keeping with its emphasis on congregational authority, the LCMC rarely makes statements on social or theological issues, although it has issued an "admonition" that sexual activity take place "only within the boundaries of marriage between one man and one woman." The Institute of Lutheran Theology was also started by the WordAlone Network.

WordAlone played a role in the creation of Lutheran CORE which formed in 2005 in opposition to the growing acceptance of same sex marriage within the ELCA, ultimately leading to the creation of the North American Lutheran Church.

== Organizations founded or developed by WordAlone ==
- Augsburg Lutheran Churches
- Institute of Lutheran Theology
- Lutheran Congregations in Mission for Christ
- Lutheran CORE
