= Lutheran Congregations in Mission for Christ =

Lutheran association

- Classification: Protestant
- Orientation: Lutheran
- Theology: Lutheran and Evangelical
- Polity: Congregationalist polity
- Origin: 2001
- Separated from: Evangelical Lutheran Church in America
- Congregations: 1,065 (869 in the United States)
- Members: 350,000
- Official website: www.lcmc.net

Lutheran Congregations in Mission for Christ (LCMC) is an association of Lutheran congregations located primarily in the United States. It describes itself as an affiliation of autonomous Lutheran churches and not a denomination. It began in 2001 in response to some liberal views of the Evangelical Lutheran Church in America (ELCA). LCMC is characterized by the stances it takes on Lutheran polity, biblical authority, and human sexuality. The group describes itself as "a centrist Lutheran church body", noting that it stands between the more liberal ELCA and the more conservative Lutheran Church – Missouri Synod (LCMS) and other Lutheran church bodies in North America. The LCMC reported having 350,000 members in 2014.

== History ==
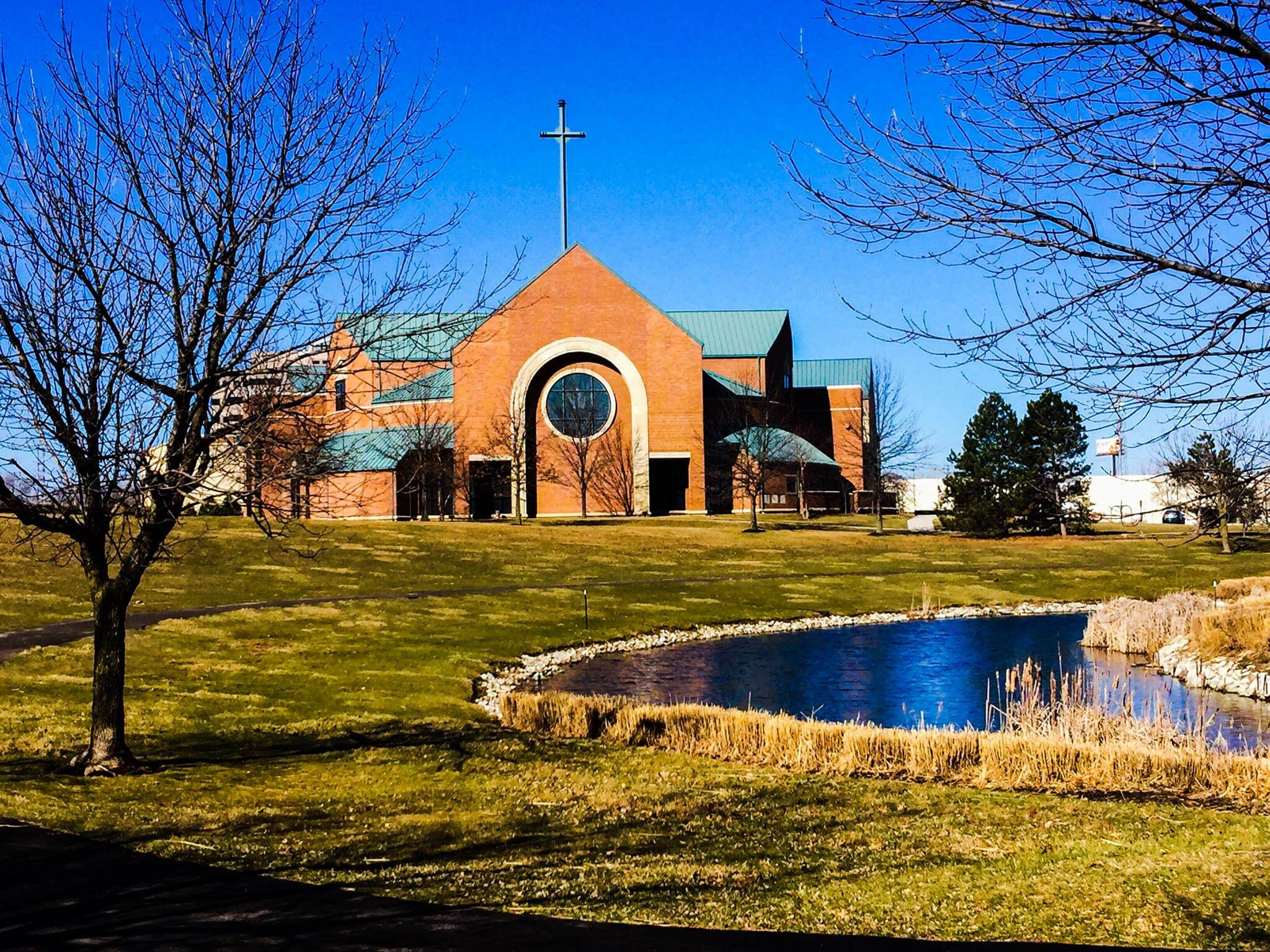
Upper Arlington Lutheran Church, a member congregation in Columbus, Ohio, United States.

LCMC was started by the WordAlone Network as an alternative for local churches that no longer believed that they could remain in the ELCA and work to reform it. The organization began in 2001 with 31 congregations as charter members. As of October 2025, membership was reported as 1065 congregations, including 869 US congregations in 38 states, the U.S. territories of Guam and Puerto Rico, as well as over 196 congregations in 19 other countries (including Belarus, Cambodia, Canada, Ethiopia, Mexico, Nicaragua, Russia, South Sudan, and Vietnam). LCMC is the fourth largest Lutheran group in the United States by number of congregations, after the ELCA, the LCMS, and the Wisconsin Evangelical Lutheran Synod (WELS). It is effectively tied with WELS in number of congregants.

== Polity and beliefs ==
LCMC is congregational in structure, rejecting the historic episcopate which was adopted by the ELCA, the denomination to which many LCMC members had previously belonged, in the Called to Common Mission agreement.

The beliefs of LCMC are based on the Bible and the Lutheran confessions in the Book of Concord. On one important issue, LCMC stands apart from other conservative Lutheran denominations: it permits, but does not require the ordination of female clergy. LCMC allows congregations to call both men and women to ordained ministry. Some congregations' constitutions and bylaws allow only men to be installed into the Office of Holy Ministry.

LCMC does not bless same-sex partnerships and requires all pastors on their clergy list to subscribe to their pastoral admonition on human sexuality: "We affirm that God created us male and female, and that it is God's will and intention that human sexual expression and fulfillment take place only within the boundaries of marriage between one man and one woman (Genesis 2:24-25; Matthew 19:4-6; and Mark 10:2-9). And, we confess as individuals and as congregations that we have not fulfilled God's will in our decisions, modeling, and teaching."

LCMC has not adopted "a social statement nor a pastoral admonition" concerning abortion. However, the LCMC medical plans do not cover abortions and its website advertises Lutherans For Life as a pro-life ministry.

LCMC has both evangelical catholic and charismatic strands. Many congregations hold to liturgical forms and vested celebrants when leading worship and administering the Sacrament of the Altar. The LCMC brings together the sacramental, evangelical, and charismatic nature of the church into one fold. The LCMC has ten geographic and three non-geographic districts. The non-geographic districts are theologically oriented.

== See also ==
- Confessing Movement
- North American Lutheran Church
