= North American Lutheran Church =

Lutheran denomination in North America

- Official logo of the North American Lutheran Church
- Abbreviation: NALC
- Classification: Protestant
- Orientation: Confessional Lutheran (self-described)
- Scripture: Bible (Old and New Testaments; Apocrypha used liturgically)
- Theology: Lutheran
- Polity: Episcopal–congregational
- Governance: Mixed episcopal oversight and congregational accountability
- Bishop: Dan Selbo
- General Secretary: Amy Little
- Associations: Global Confessional and Missional Lutheran Forum
- Region: United States, Canada, and Mexico
- Language: English; Spanish; Chinese; Amharic; Oromo; Korean; German; Arabic
- Liturgy: Lutheran
- Headquarters: Bedford, Texas (continental office)
- Origin: August 27, 2010; 15 years ago Grove City, Ohio, United States
- Separated from: Evangelical Lutheran Church in America; Evangelical Lutheran Church in Canada
- Congregations: 557 (self-reported, 2025)
- Members: 125,000 baptized members (self-reported, 2025)
- Official website: Official website

The North American Lutheran Church (NALC) is a Christian Lutheran church body in the United States, Canada, and Mexico. It was constituted in 2010 amid debates within North American Lutheranism—particularly in the Evangelical Lutheran Church in America (ELCA) and the Evangelical Lutheran Church in Canada (ELCIC)—concerning the authority of Scripture (see Sola scriptura), confessional identity, church governance, and questions related to ordination and sexuality.

The NALC has described its theological stance as occupying what it considers the “center” of Lutheranism in North America, with an emphasis on continuity with historic Christian teachings. It has stated an intention to avoid alignment with either liberal or conservative political or ideological categories. The denomination summarizes its mission through four internally articulated values: “Christ Centered,” “Mission Driven,” “Traditionally Grounded,” and “Congregationally Focused.” These reflect the organization’s self-identification and theological priorities.

In denominational reporting for 2025, the NALC stated that it included 557 congregations and approximately 125,000 baptized members. Independent reporting varies by reference year; the Association of Religion Data Archives (ARDA), drawing on U.S. Religion Census reporting streams, lists 457 congregations in the United States for 2020.

== History ==
=== Background and origins (2009–2010) ===
The NALC developed out of Lutheran CORE (Coalition for Renewal), a confessional renewal network operating within and across North American Lutheran denominations. Lutheran CORE drew support from multiple ELCA renewal currents, including the WordAlone Network and the Solid Rock Lutherans coalition, as well as figures associated with the broader Confessing Movement. Contemporary reporting in 2009–2010 connected emerging Lutheran realignments to the ELCA’s decisions at the 2009 ELCA Churchwide Assembly permitting the ordination of ministers in publicly accountable, lifelong same-sex relationships, alongside wider disputes concerning Scripture, doctrine and church life.

On February 18, 2010, Lutheran CORE circulated A Vision and Plan for the North American Lutheran Church and Lutheran CORE, proposing a church structure that combined episcopal oversight with a stated emphasis on congregational mission and mutual accountability.

=== Constituting convocation (2010) ===
The NALC was constituted at a Lutheran CORE convocation held August 26–27, 2010, in Grove City, Ohio. Contemporary reporting indicated that the denomination began with approximately 17 charter congregations and grew rapidly in its initial years. The convocation elected the retired ELCA bishop Paull Spring as provisional bishop.

=== Leadership developments (2011–present) ===
At the NALC’s 2011 annual gathering, John Bradosky was elected bishop. He served as bishop until 2019. In 2019, Dan Selbo was elected bishop and was re-elected in 2023.

==== Bishops ====
- Paull Spring (provisional, 2010–2011)
- John Bradosky (2011–2019)
- Dan Selbo (2019–present)

== Doctrine and practice ==
According to its published doctrinal statements, the NALC understands itself to be part of the one holy, catholic, and apostolic Church. It affirms the Bible as the inspired Word of God and as the authoritative source and norm by which all doctrine and practice are judged.

The denomination receives the faith of the Church as confessed in the ecumenical creeds and understands the Lutheran Confessions to be faithful witnesses to the teaching of Holy Scripture.

NALC leaders and materials have also described the denomination as encompassing a range of Lutheran theological and spiritual emphases held together within a shared confessional framework. These include commitments to doctrinal clarity, discipleship and catechesis, pastoral proclamation centered on Law and Gospel, sacramental and liturgical continuity with the historic Church, and an outwardly focused missional orientation shaped by global Lutheran partnerships. The denomination has presented these emphases as complementary rather than competing, reflecting a self-understanding that Lutheran identity is most faithfully expressed through the integration of confession, proclamation, worship, and mission.

=== Ordained ministry ===
The NALC provides for the ordination of men and women to the ministry of Word and Sacrament and states that all ecclesial offices, including the office of bishop, may be held by qualified persons.

=== Doctrine ===
The Joint Commission on Theology and Doctrine of the NALC and Lutheran CORE endorsed an anti-abortion stance in the document "The Lord Is with You" – A Word of Counsel to the Church – The Sanctity of Nascent Life", on December 14, 2012. The North American Lutheran Church is associated with Lutherans For Life.

The NALC upholds traditional Christian teaching on marriage and sexual ethics. The confession of faith in its constitution includes the Common Confession of 2005 which states: "We believe and confess that the marriage of male and female is an institution created and blessed by God. From marriage, God forms families to serve as the building blocks of all human civilization and community. We teach and practice that sexual activity belongs exclusively within the Biblical boundaries of a faithful marriage between one man and one woman."

The NALC officially disapproves of homosexual relationships and same-sex marriage. Bishop Bradosky joined other religious leaders in the open letter, "Marriage and Religious Freedom: Fundamental Goods That Stand or Fall Together – An Open Letter from Religious Leaders in the United States to All Americans", released on January 12, 2012, on his support for the protection of marriage as the union between a man and a woman and in opposition to same-sex marriage. He was also one of the American religious leaders who signed the open letter "Free Exercise on Religion: Putting Beliefs into Practice", expressing his support for the Roman Catholic Church in its opposition to the HHS mandate.

== Polity and governance ==
The NALC describes its structure as supporting congregational mission while providing pastoral oversight and doctrinal accountability through representative bodies.

=== Bishop and General Secretary ===
The Bishop serves as chief pastor and chief executive officer of the church body. The office is described by the NALC as including responsibilities for oversight of ordained ministry, visitation, doctrinal guidance, and representation in ecumenical relations. The General Secretary is designated by the constitution as chief operating officer, responsible for the administration of denominational operations.

=== Governance ===
The NALC constitution provides for a biennial Convocation as its primary representative assembly. Between convocations, an Executive Council functions as the board of directors, with membership and responsibilities defined by the constitution. The constitution provides for a Court of Adjudication to hear appeals in disciplinary matters and to interpret governing documents. The NALC Canada Section is the legal entity of the North American Lutheran Church in Canada, and is a registered charity in Canada.

=== Mission districts and deans ===
The NALC organizes congregations into regional mission districts (and, in some cases, mission regions) overseen by mission district deans who collaborate with the bishop in pastoral care and support for congregations and clergy. Denominational reporting has also described the use of “Area Assistants to the Bishop” to support congregations and mission districts and to provide regional oversight and coordination across North America.

== Ministries ==
The NALC describes its work as including domestic and global mission partnerships, church planting initiatives, multicultural ministries, youth and family ministry, and disaster response. Denominational reporting for 2025 describes work in “New Mission Starts,” including grant-supported initiatives and mission development in multiple contexts. In connection with its 2025 “Lutheran Week” gathering (a denominational reporting and convocation cycle), the NALC also published summary materials that described an emphasis on congregational renewal, equipping resources, and mission initiatives to “transform” local communities.

=== Disaster response ===
NALC Disaster Response is an affiliated ministry that coordinates volunteer deployments and material aid in response to natural disasters and emergencies. NALC reporting also identifies NALC Disaster Response as a designated mission fund and describes coordinated disaster-response support as part of its ministry portfolio.

== Institutions ==
=== North American Lutheran Seminary ===
The North American Lutheran Seminary (NALS) operates as a distributed model of theological education centered at Trinity Anglican Seminary in Ambridge, Pennsylvania, where Lutheran and Anglican candidates for ordained ministry are trained together with shared faculty. Other schools in the NALS Network include Gordon Conwell Theological Seminary, Beeson Divinity School, and Fuller Theological Seminary.

== Relations with other churches ==
The NALC Convocation, held in August 2011, approved unanimously the establishment of full communion with the Ethiopian Evangelical Church Mekane Yesus (EECMY). A Memorandum of Understanding (MoU) between the NALC and the Evangelical Lutheran Church in Tanzania (ELCT) was approved at the Convocation held in August 2013, paving the way for full communion between the two churches. In 2025, the NALC signed a MoU with the North Western Gossner Evangelical Lutheran Church (NWGELC) in India.

The NALC has established ecumenical dialogues with other Lutheran church bodies, such as the Lutheran Church – Missouri Synod (LCMS), the Lutheran Church–Canada (LCC), and the Lutheran Congregations in Mission for Christ (LCMC), as well as with the Roman Catholic Church, the Anglican Church in North America (ACNA), and the Eastern Orthodox Churches. The NALC passed a request to the Anglican Church in North America to share clergy where there were vacancies, which was accepted. In 2017, the ecumenical consultation of the ACNA and the NALC developed “Four Pastoral and Educational Affirmations” on “Baptism”, “Holy Communion”, “Holy Scripture”, and “Jesus Christ, Gospel, and Justification”.

The NALC held an ecumenical summit with representatives of the ACNA, the LCMS, and the LCC on May 3–5, 2013, at the Church of the Holy Communion in Dallas, Texas, on the theme of “Biblical Teaching on Marriage and Sexuality”. The summit issued the joint document “An Affirmation of Marriage”, signed by representatives of all four church bodies, which defined the institution of marriage as the unity between a man and a woman.

At its 2012 Convocation, the NALC approved, by the required majority of two thirds of the voters, a resolution to seek membership in the Lutheran World Federation. The application request was not approved by the LWF, remaining in a pending decision, according to a letter issued in May 2014, despite the support of the Lutheran Churches of Ethiopia and Tanzania. The NALC has considered possible associate membership in the International Lutheran Council.

The NALC is a founding and convening participant in the Global Confessional and Missional Lutheran Forum (Global Forum). In September 2018, the Global Forum met in Bishoftu, Ethiopia, and released the “Bishoftu Letter to the Churches” on Reformation Day (October 31), describing the document as a summary and clarification of Lutheran biblical and confessional teaching and as a response to perceived recent doctrinal errors. Forum gatherings have also been hosted in Oklahoma City (2023), Nairobi, Kenya (2025), with a future gathering planned for Orlando (2027).
