= Villaverde (surname) =

Villaverde is a Spanish surname. Notable people with the surname include:

== Iberian people ==
- Ana Fernández-Villaverde (born 1972), better known by her stage name La Bien Querida, Spanish painter and musician
- Alberto Villaverde (footballer) (1904–1969), Spanish footballer
- Alberto Villaverde Cabral (1942–1996), Portuguese journalist and politician
  - Teresa Villaverde (born 1966), Portuguese film director and daughter of the above
- Bartolomé González de Villaverde (1512–1589), Spanish notary and conquistador
- Clemente Villaverde (born 1959), Spanish former footballer
- Fernando Villaverde (1894–1937), Spanish footballer
- Manuel Velázquez Villaverde (1943–2016), Spanish footballer
- Raimundo Fernández-Villaverde (1848–1905), Spanish statesman
- Saturno Villaverde (1892–1967), Spanish footballer
- Senén Villaverde (1896–1950), Spanish footballer
- Trinidad Arroyo Villaverde (1872–1959), Spanish ophthalmologist

== Cuban people ==
- Alberto Martín y Villaverde (1904–1960), Cuban Bishop of the Roman Catholic Diocese of Matanzas
- Cirilo Villaverde (1812–1894), Cuban poet, novelist, journalist, and freedom fighter
- Emilia Casanova de Villaverde (1832–1897), Cuban political activist
- Jorge Villaverde (1934–2002), Cuban-born exile living in the USA
- Manolo Villaverde (1936–2026), Cuban-born American actor
- Rafael Villaverde (1942–1982), Cuban-born exile living in the USA

== South American people ==
- Beatriz Villaverde (born 1958), Argentine tennis player
- Hugo Villaverde (1954–2024), Argentine footballer
- Ramón Alberto Villaverde (1930–1986), Uruguayan footballer
- Susana Maria Villaverde (born 1955), Argentine-born Swiss tennis player

== See also ==
- Villaverde (disambiguation)
