= Casanova (disambiguation) =

Casanova often refers to Giacomo Casanova, an 18th-century Italian adventurer best known for his legendary womanizing.

Casanova may also refer to:

== People ==
- Casanova (surname)

== Film and TV ==
- Casanova (1918 film), a 1918 Hungarian film
- Casanova, or The Loves of Casanova, a 1927 French film
- Casanova (1934 film), a 1934 French comedy drama film
- Casanova (1971 TV serial), a BBC television serial
- Casanova '73, a BBC1 sitcom starring Leslie Phillips
- Fellini's Casanova, a 1976 feature film by Federico Fellini
- Casanova (1987 film), an American biographical comedy TV-film directed by Simon Langton
- Casanova (2005 TV serial), a 2005 BBC Television serial starring David Tennant and Peter O'Toole
- Casanova (2005 film), a 2005 feature film starring Heath Ledger

== Books ==
- Casanova (novel), a 1998 novel by Andrew Miller
- Casanova (comics), a 2006 espionage comic book

== Music ==
- Casanova (Benatzky), a 1928 operetta, based on music by Johann Strauss II
- Casanova, a concerto for cello and wind orchestra by Johan de Meij
- Casanova (rapper), an American rapper
- Casanova (German band), a German rock band
- Casanovas, a Swedish dansband
- The Casanovas, an Australian, Melbourne-based rock band

=== Albums ===
- Casanova (Rondò Veneziano album), 1985
- Casanova, a 1987 album by Cristiano Malgioglio
- CasaNova (Udo Lindenberg album), 1988
- Casanova, a 1991 album by the German rock band Casanova
- Casanova (The Divine Comedy album), 1996

=== Songs ===
- "Casanova", a song by Roxy Music from the 1974 album Country Life
- "Casanova" (Anita Skorgan song), from the 1977 Eurovision Song Contest
- "Casanova" (Luv' song), from the 1979 album Lots of Luv'
- "Casanova" (LeVert song), 1987 single from the album The Big Throwdown
- "Casanova", a song by Peaches from the 2000 album The Teaches of Peaches
- "Casanova" (Paulina Rubio song), 2002
- "Casanova" (Gisela song), 2008 Eurovision song by Gisela, representing Andorra
- "Casanova", a song by Norwegian duo Cir.Cuz, 2016
- "Casanova", a song by Vivek from the 2016 Indian film Jil Jung Juk
- "Casanova", a song by Allie X from the 2017 album CollXtion II
- "Casanova" (WeRe-VaNa song), 2021
- "Casanova" (Soolking and Gazo song), 2023

== Places ==
- Casanova, Haute-Corse, a commune of the Haute-Corse département of France, on the island of Corsica
- Casanova, Pennsylvania, a census-designated place in Centre County, Pennsylvania, United States
- Casanova, Virginia, an unincorporated community in Fauquier County, Virginia, United States

== Other uses ==
- Casanova (restaurant), a restaurant in Carmel-by-the-Sea, California, United States

== See also ==
- Casanovva, a 2012 Indian Malayalam romantic action thriller film
