= Casanova (surname) =

Casanova is a surname originating from the Romance languages, which translates literally as "new house" in Latin. Notable people with the surname include:

- Achille Casanova (1941–2016), Swiss journalist and politician
- Alain Casanova (born 1961), French football player and manager
- Briley Casanova (born 1994), American gymnast
- Bruno Casanova (born 1964), Italian Grand Prix motorcycle road racer.
- Bruno Óscar Casanova (born 1984), Argentine football player.
- Cessy Casanova (born circa 1969), Mexican comedian and singer.
- Claudio Casanova (1895–1916), Italian football player
- Coral Del Mar Casanova, Puerto Rican beauty pageant titleholder
- Corina Casanova (born 1956), chancellor of Switzerland
- Danielle Casanova (1909–1943), French militant communist and member of the French resistance, first wife of Laurent Casanova
- Delia Casanova (born 1948), Mexican actress
- Dino Casanova (1967–2002), American wrestler
- Eduardo Casanova (born 1991), Spanish actor and filmmaker
- Emilia Casanova de Villaverde (1832–1897), Cuban political activist
- Félix Casanova de Ayala (1915–1990), Spanish poet.
- Fernando Casanova (born 1988), Dominican football player
- Francesco Giuseppe Casanova (1727–1803), Italian painter, brother of Giacomo Casanova
- Gaetano Casanova (1697–1733), Italian actor and ballet dancer, father of Giacomo Casanova
- Giacomo Casanova (1725–1798), Italian adventurer and writer
- Giovanni Battista Casanova (1730–1795), Italian painter, brother of Giacomo Casanova
- Hernando Casanova (1945–2002), Colombian television actor.
- Jaime de Casanova (died 1504), Spanish Catholic cardinal
- Jean-Claude Casanova (born 1934), French economist and intellectual, former chairman of the Fondation Nationale des Sciences Politiques
- Julián Casanova (born 1956), Spanish historian, brother of José Casanova (sociologist)
- Jorge Daniel Casanova (born 1976), Uruguayan football player
- Jorge Francisco Casanova (born 1984), Venezuelan football player
- José Casanova (footballer) (1964–1987), Peruvian football player
- José Casanova (sociologist) (born 1951), Spanish-American sociologist, brother of Julián Casanova
- José Antonio Casanova (1918–1999), Venezuelan baseball player and manager
- Kenny Casanova (born 1971), American wrestler and manager
- Laurent Casanova (1906–1972), French politician
- Len Casanova (1905–2002), U.S. college football coach, member of the College Football Hall of Fame
- Lourdes Casanova, Spanish academic and author
- Luis Casanova (born 1992), Chilean football player
- Manuel Casanova, American medical professor
- María Casanova de Chaudet, Italian-born Argentine geologist, chemist and petrographer
- Michael Casanova (born 1989), Swiss football player
- Myriam Casanova (born 1985), Swiss tennis player
- Nacho Casanova (born 1987), Spanish football player
- Paul Casanova (1941–2017), Cuban baseball player
- Rafael Casanova (1660–1743), Conseller en Cap of the Consell de Cent of Barcelona during the siege of the city by the troops of Philip V of Spain
- Raul Casanova (born 1972), Puerto Rican baseball player
- Rodolfo Casanova (1915–1980), Mexican boxer
- Sara Casanova (born 1977), Italian politician
- Sofía Casanova (1861–1958), Spanish journalist and writer
- Tommy Casanova (born 1950), U.S. football player, member of the College Football Hall of Fame, former Louisiana state senator
- Tristano Casanova (born 1983), German actor
- Vicente Casanova y Marzol (1854–1930), Spanish Catholic cardinal

== See also ==
- Casanova
- Casanova (disambiguation)
- Khasanova
