= Waldo H. Dubberstein =

American intelligence officer (1907–1983)

Waldo Dubberstein
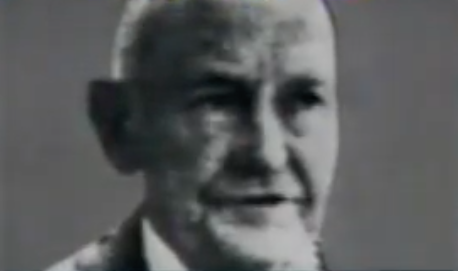
- Born: October 21, 1907; Bellefont, Kansas
- Died: April 29, 1983 (aged 75); Arlington, Virginia
- Cause of death: Shotgun blast
- Education: St. John's College; Concordia Lutheran Seminary; University of Chicago
- Military career
- Branch: United States Army; Defense Intelligence Agency; Central Intelligence Agency
- Nickname: Doobie
- Conflicts: World War II; Cold War
- Other work: American Association of University Professors; American Historical Association; American Oriental Society; American Political Science Association; Middle East Institute

Waldo Herman "Doobie" Dubberstein (October 21, 1907 - April 29, 1983) was a lifelong American intelligence officer, and a scholar and professor of middle eastern studies, political science, history, and archaeology. He worked for decades at both the Defense Intelligence Agency (DIA) and Central Intelligence Agency (CIA). Dubberstein was involved with the American intelligence effort surrounding Anwar Sadat's visit to Jerusalem, border hostilities between Egypt and Libya, and the Camp David accords.

In 1983, the day after he was indicted by a grand jury on selling classified information in connection with Edwin P. Wilson and Frank Terpil, he was found dead of a shotgun blast to the head in an apparent suicide. While his death was ruled a suicide, Dubberstein's family, former colleagues, and some federal investigators suspect that he was murdered. One of four notes left to his lawyers read "I am not guilty." The contents of the other three notes are not known.

== Early career as a scholar ==
Dubberstein earned an undergraduate degree from St. John's College in Winfield, Kansas. Later, he attended the Concordia Lutheran Seminary in St. Louis, Missouri. In 1931, he earned a master's degree in history from the University of Chicago. In 1934, continuing his education at Chicago, he earned a Ph.D. in Oriental (Middle Eastern) studies.

Beginning in 1934, Dubberstein served as a research associate and instructor at Chicago. He taught in the departments of Oriental Studies and History, teaching courses in history and the Middle East. While working at Chicago, he travelled to the Middle East on archaeological field expeditions. One of the sites he visited was Persepolis.

== Career as an intelligence officer ==
In March 1942, Dubberstein joined the United States Army where he served as an officer in the Signal Intelligence Service during World War II. Dubberstein also served in the United States Army Security Agency.

In 1947, Dubberstein resigned from the University of Chicago and joined the newly created Central Intelligence Agency (CIA). He served in the CIA until 1970.

In 1958, Dubberstein served as a professorial lecturer at George Washington University. He was also a consultant to the Hudson Institute, McLaughlin Research Associates, and the Center for International Business at Pepperdine University, and other think tanks.

In 1970 and 1974, Dubberstein taught courses in the International Relations department at the National War College covering South Asia, the Middle East, and North Africa.

From 1972 to 1973, Dubberstein was Special Assistant to the Director of the Office of National Narcotics Intelligence (ONNI).

In 1974, he joined as a Defense Intelligence Officer in the Defense Intelligence Agency. He worked at the DIA until 1982.

== Scandal and death ==
On April 28, 1983, Dubberstein was indicted by a grand jury on seven counts of selling secret military data to Libya. Dubberstein was also accused of having clandestine relations with Edwin P. Wilson - a former CIA officer who was smuggling guns into Libya. The charges alleged that in 1977 and 1978, Dubberstein had traded classified military secrets through Wilson to Muammar Gaddafi for money. It was further alleged that he had traveled to Tripoli to discuss Israeli and Egyptian troop strengths in the Middle East with Libyan intelligence officers. The court scheduled him to be arraigned the next day in the Federal District Court in Alexandria, Virginia.

On April 29, after failing to appear in court, District Judge Albert V. Bryan Jr. issued a warrant for his arrest. Arlington police discovered Dubberstein dead in the storage room of the River Place apartment building in Arlington, Virginia. Dubberstein - a 75-year-old man - was living with a 35-year-old woman at the time, after having been separated from his wife, and it was her apartment complex that his body was found in. A shotgun was laying by his side, and the Arlington County Police Department determined that he had committed suicide. The autopsy performed by Deputy Chief Medical Examiner Dr. James C. Beyer read: "perforating shotgun wound to the head consistent with being self-inflicted."

Tom Bell, the Arlington Police Spokesman, told a press conference that "He had been shot once in the head. He was dead. Based upon the angle of the body at the time we discovered it, and the evidence present at that site, there is nothing to substantiate anything other than a suicide at this time."

=== Investigators suspect murder ===
One of the primary reasons that investigators at the time suspected Dubberstein might have been murdered was that the arms dealer, Wilson, was in prison for the exact reason that he had plotted to kill people who had knowledge of his arms dealing in Libya. Dubberstein was the third intelligence officer from the CIA connected with Edwin Wilson to be found dead within two years. Rafael Villaverde's boat exploded in April 1982, and Kevin Mulcahy was found dead of apparent natural causes in November 1982.

Professor Ignace Gelb told the Washington Post that: "He didn't need the money. We used to joke that he was collecting a tremendous amount of money in salary and pension. Besides, he was very stingy."

Marie Dubberstein told the Washington Times that she had eaten dinner with her husband the day that he was indicted. She told the newspaper: "I don't think he committed suicide."

However, Dubberstein's lawyer Howard Bushman, in an ABC Nightline interview later in the day that Dubberstein's body was discovered, said: "I think on the surface there's always people that wanna try to relate information such as this and make more out of it. I think that in Waldo's case his situation and the facts in his case should control his individual situation."

== Publications and contributions ==
- World Book Encyclopedia
- Encyclopedia Britannica
- Babylonian Chronology
- History of the World: From the Ancient Crete to the End of the Middle Ages
- The Glories of Ancient History
