= Kevin Mulcahy =

Kevin Mulcahy may refer to:

- Kevin V. Mulcahy, American political scientist and professor
- Kevin Patrick Mulcahy, American computer programmer and CIA spy
