= Fernando Casanova =

Fernando Casanova may refer to:

- Fernando Casanova (footballer)
- Fernando Casanova (actor)
