= Bistro Moulin =

Restaurant in Monterey, California, US

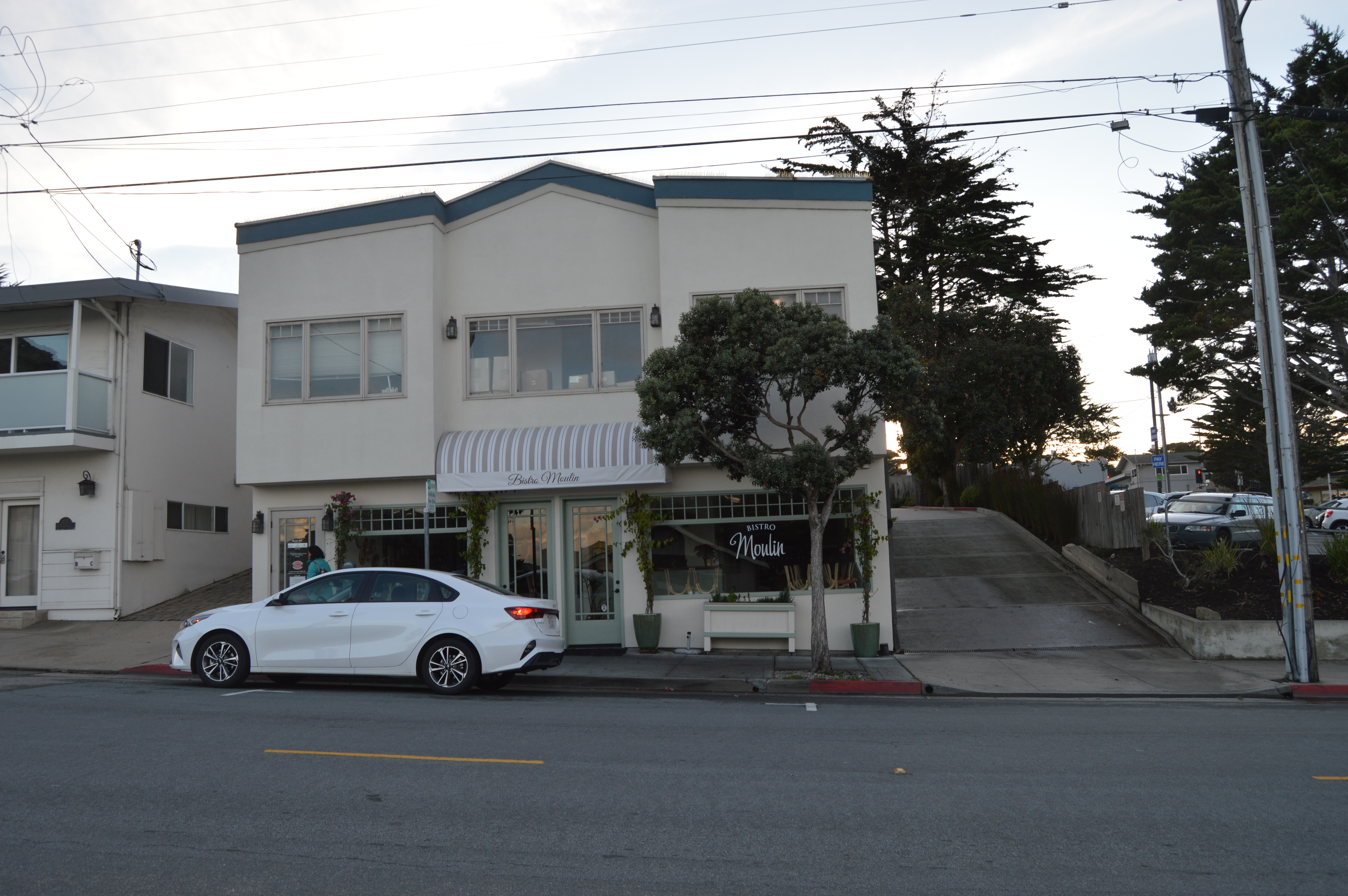
- Interactive map of Bistro Moulin

Restaurant information
- Established: 2007
- Owners: Federico and Sabrina Rusciano
- Previous owners: Didier Dutertre; Colleen Manni
- Head chef: Federico Rusciano
- Food type: French cuisine
- Dress code: Casual
- Location: 867 Wave St, Monterey, Monterey County, California, 93940, United States
- Coordinates: 36°37′2.06″N 121°54′9.57″W
- Reservations: Yes
- Website: bistromoulin.com

Bistro Moulin is a restaurant in the New Monterey neighborhood of Monterey, California in the United States that serves French cuisine.

== History ==
Bistro Moulin is owned and operated by French-born chef/owner Didier Dutertre and sommelier Colleen "Coco" Manni. Prior to opening Bistro Moulin, Dutertre, who is originally from Normandy, France, served as executive chef of Casanova for 25 years.

In 2009, Bistro Moulin released a line of condiments, specifically balsamic vinegar, olive oil, and the restaurant's signature salad dressing comprising white pear balsamic, Greek olive oil, and Dijon mustard.

In 2023, chef Federico Rusciano and his wife, Sabrina Rusciano, took over the restaurant from Dutertre, reopening the dining room that spring with a new interior.

== Design and ambiance ==
The small bistro, which is located in a former sushi restaurant, has 10 tables, including booths, with red and white checkered tablecloths. Antique French dishware and a French flag hang on the walls. Chandeliers and candles provide lighting. Wine is displayed on select walls. Gayot described the restaurant as having shabby chic decor. The restaurant plays bal-musette music in the background.

== Cuisine and wine ==
Bistro Moulin serves traditional French cuisine. Small plates include French onion soup, pate, and escargot cooked in garlic and hazelnut butter. Main dishes include confit de canard, coq au vin, mussels, duck confit, cannelloni with truffles, and steak frites. Monterey Herald food critic Mike Hale named the bistro's French fries as among the best in Monterey County. Desserts include chocolate mousse, lemon meringue tart, creme brulee and profiteroles.

Bistro Moulin's house speciality is French spinach gnocchi. Dutertre created the dish, which he brought with him after leaving Casanova to open the bistro. The recipe comprises gnocchi made from pastry dough (pâte à choux), seasoned with nutmeg, and cooked with spinach. Monterey food critic, Mike Hale, describes the gnocchi as "luscious, ethereal morsels bathed and baked in a decadent Parmesan cream sauce." Food critic Ricardo Diaz described the gnocchi as tasting "better than it looks" due to its bright green color. The dish is one of Monterey County's top 100 "bites" to try before one dies according to the Monterey Herald.

Managed by sommelier and wine director Colleen Manni, the wine list has over 100 bottles, comprising California, including local Monterey County wines, and European wines. Wines include rosé from Provence, Marsannay, Pinot Noir, Chardonnay, Vermentino, and Gruner Veltliner.

== Reception ==
In 2009, Ricardo Diaz, food critic for The Californian described the restaurant as being like something out of a French film. Zagat calls the restaurant "quaint" and "charming." Gayot scores the restaurant 14 out of 20. Many reviewers call the restaurant "intimate." The restaurant averages a 4.5 on Yelp. Monterey Herald food critic Mike Hale says the restaurant has "consistently delicious food" and that it finds "success in its consistency, and...predictability." Former Monterey Herald food critic Lisa Magadini says that the escargot was better than that served at New York's now defunct Lutèce restaurant.
