= Alberto Villaverde =

Alberto Villaverde may refer to:

- Alberto Villaverde (footballer) (1904–1969), Spanish footballer
- Alberto Villaverde Cabral (1942–1996), Portuguese journalist and politician
