= Monterey County Weekly =

Newspaper in Monterey, California

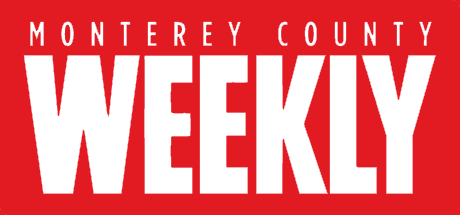
- Type: Alternative weekly
- Format: Tabloid
- Owner: Milestone Communications Inc.
- Founder: Bradley H. Zeve
- Former names: Coasting (1988); Coast Weekly (1989)
- Founded: 1988
- Headquarters: 668 Williams Ave, Seaside, California; United States
- Circulation: 33,583 (print); 4,303 (digital); 36,086 (newsletter)
- Website: montereycountyweekly.com

The Monterey County Weekly (the Weekly, for short), formerly known as the Coast Weekly, is a locally owned and independent newsmedia company founded in 1988. It publishes in print weekly, and since 2020 online daily as Monterey County NOW. The company is based in the city of Seaside, in Monterey County, California. The Weekly has been a member of the Association of Alternative Newsmedia since 1989. Erik Cushman serves as Publisher and currently sits on the California Newspaper Publishers' Association Board of Directors. Cushman was the co-founder of the Missoula Independent. The company's headquarters building in Seaside is powered by 165 solar panels on its rooftop and generates 100% of its electricity from solar.

== History ==
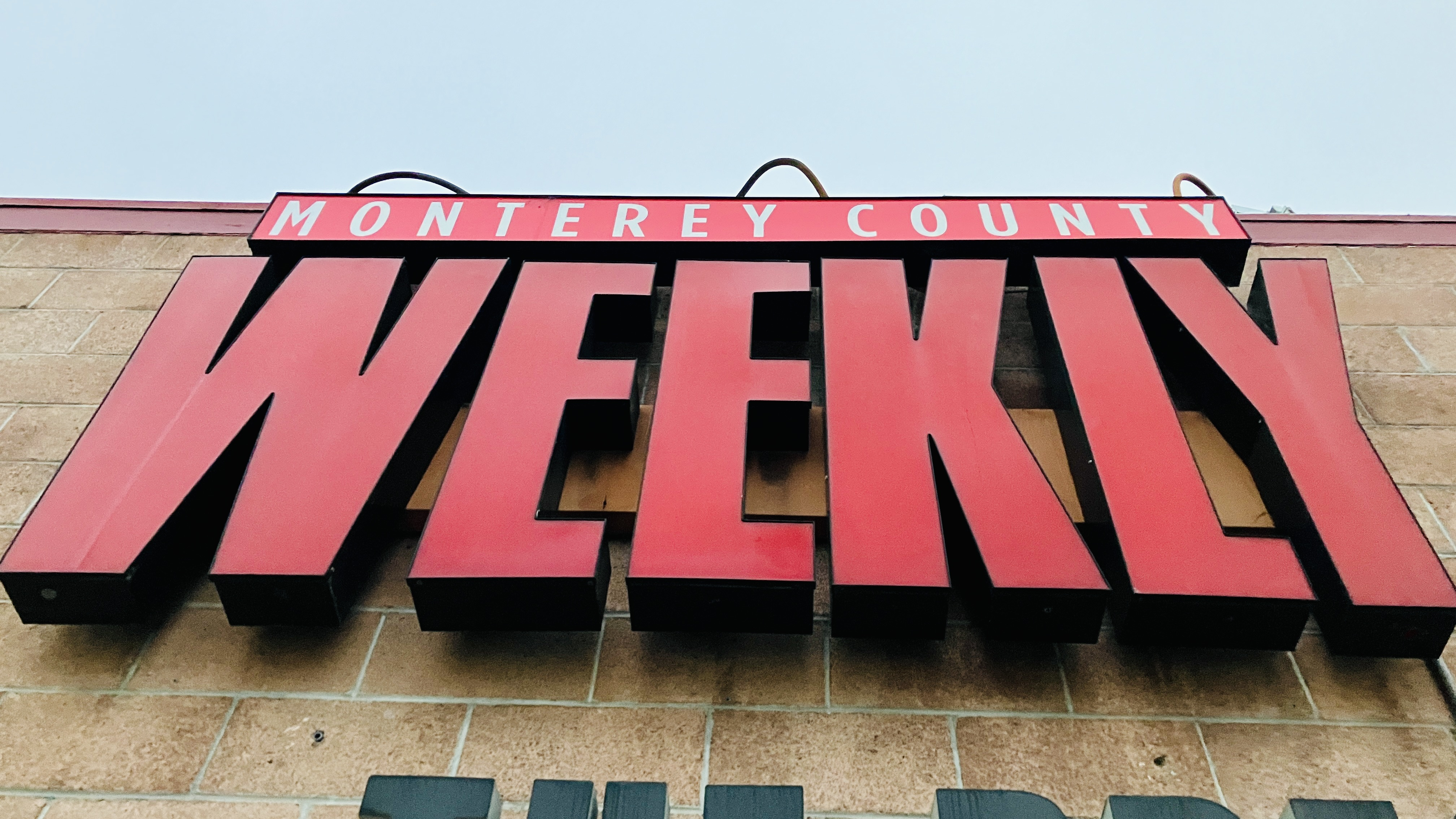
Monterey County Weekly headquarters building in Seaside, California.

=== Coasting (?? – 1989) ===
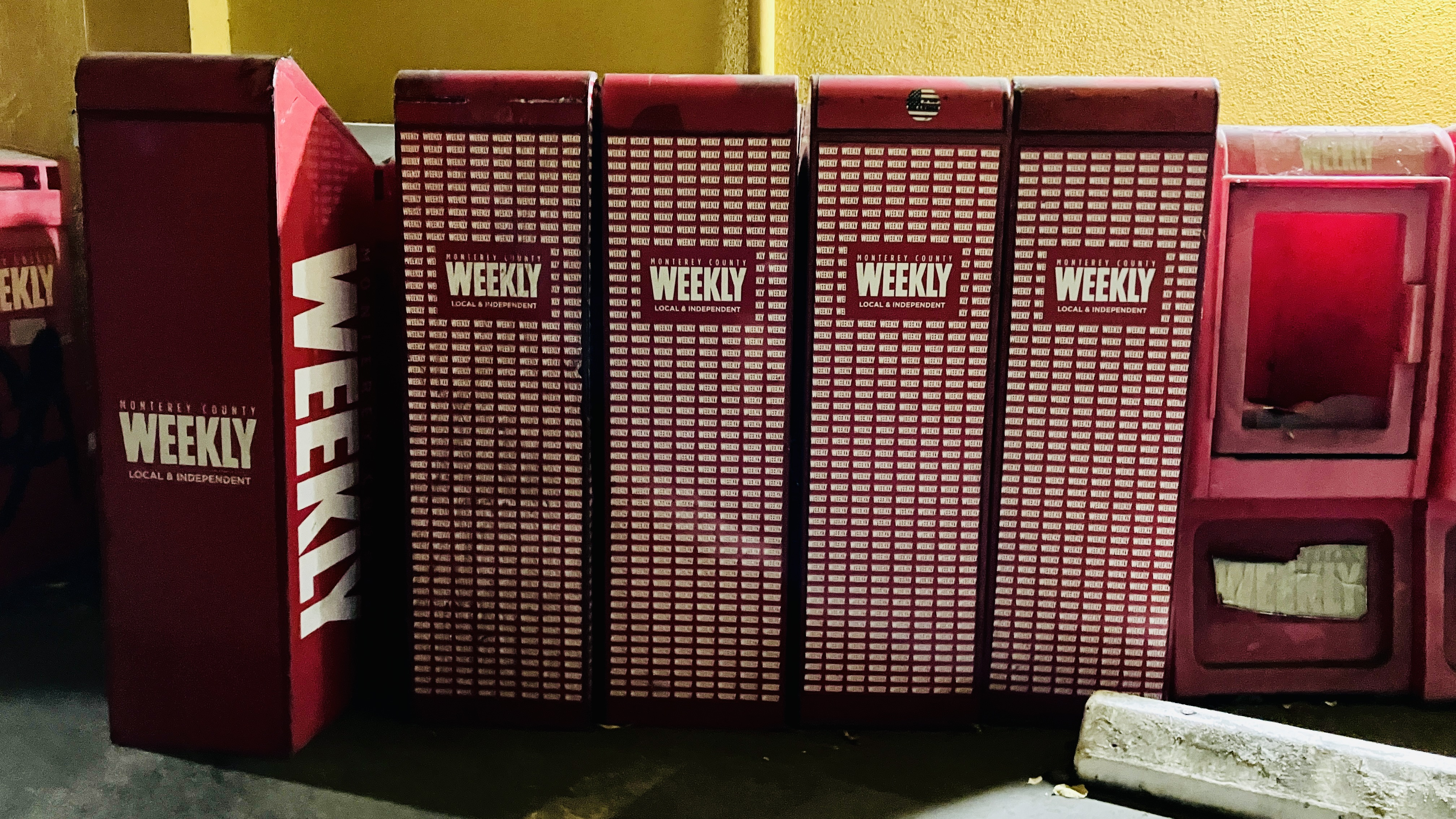
A row of old newspaper dispensers in the garage of the Monterey County Weekly headquarters in Seaside.

At some point, a weekly tourist magazine targeted at tourists in the Monterey area entitled Coasting was launched. In 1988, that magazine and its companion shopper, The Exchange, went bankrupt. Coasting's printer forced the sale of the paper. At that time, Coasting had a circulation of 10,000 copies per week.

Bradley Zeve discovered the failing paper, and borrowing money from his parents and the owners of the paper, he purchased it. He was given 24 months to pay off the capital loans. The company Milestone Communications was formed to make the purchase of Coasting. Because Zeve transformed the paper from a tourist magazine into an alternative weekly, he is often called the paper's founder. Formerly, Zeve had co-founded the Santa Cruz Sun newspaper in Santa Cruz.

When Zeve established the paper under its new modus operandi, it was headquartered in Carmel, in an L-shaped office building. According to Zeve, they were working with: "...equipment that was primitive even by 1989 standards."

Some of the original staff of Coasting were retained in the transition to Zeve's ownership, including Chuck Thurman, who became artistic director, and established the paper's new Arts section. The first news editor of the paper was the New Yorker Gersh Kuntzman, who at age 23 had never worked a gig outside of sports journalism before. In his early tenure, he pushed the paper to cover local water board meetings.

=== Coast Weekly (1989–2004) ===
In 1989, Coasting changed its name to Coast Weekly. The paper hired two full time typesetters for its production department. Their photographic darkroom at the time was in a converted bathroom in an office building in Carmel. In 1989, they also purchased a Macintosh SE/30 as their first computer.

Zeve paid off his initial two-year loan on time, and soon the paper was turning enough profit to pay all bills on time.

Within several year's of Zeve's purchase, the new paper had a circulation of 40,000 copies.

In 1990, the Weekly joined the Association of Alternative Newsmedia (AAN).

==== Move to Seaside (1991) ====
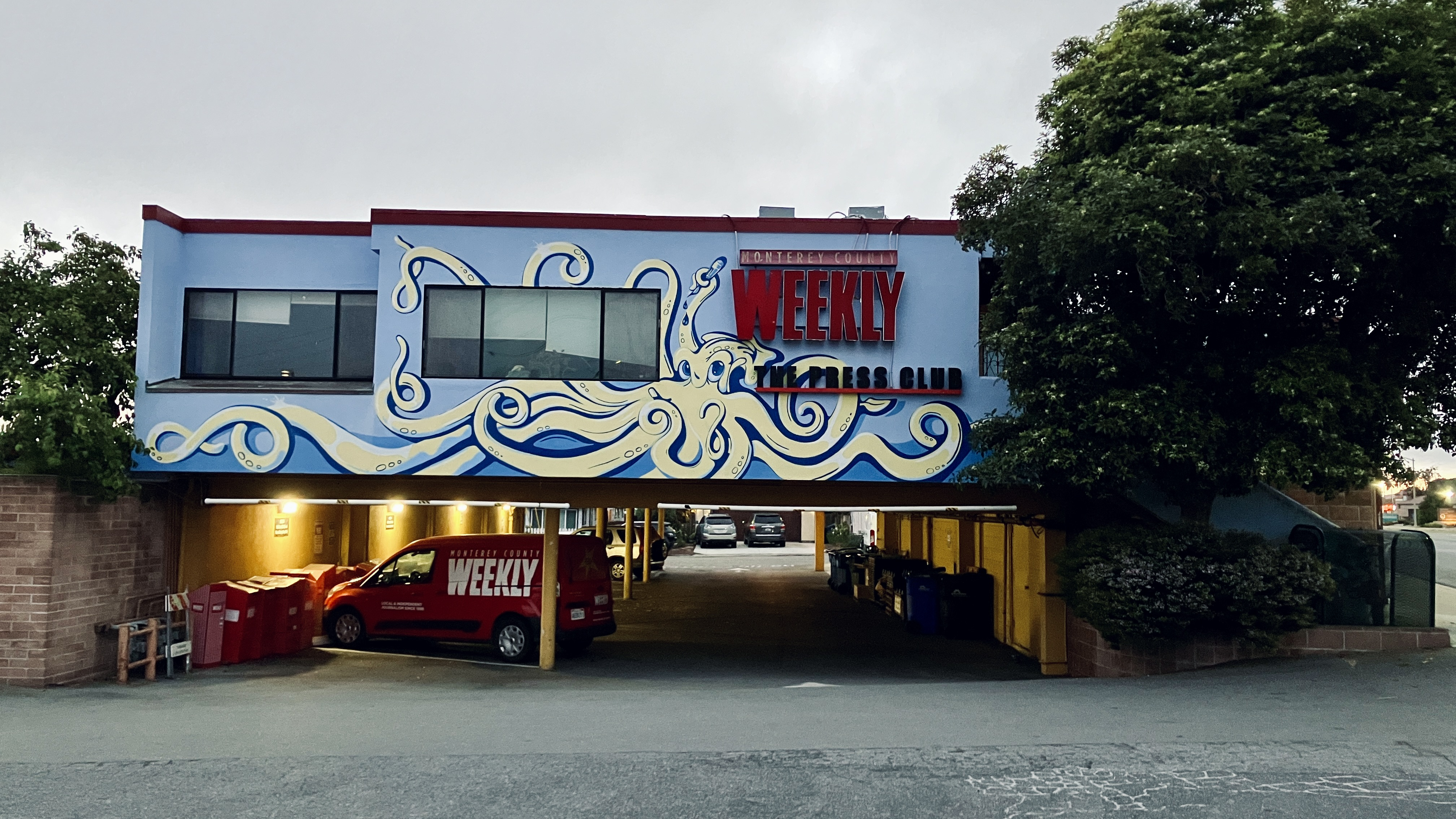
Monterey County Weekly Press Club in Seaside, next door to the headquarters.

In 1991, the Weekly moved into their new offices in Seaside, California. Their new building, formerly the Seaside Professional Building, was designed by the postmodernist architect Charles Moore. That building, originally constructed in 1960, had been the first commercial office building designed by Moore. The Weekly remodeled the building; tore out the carpets, installed skylights, and updated the windows. When Moore toured the building after the remodel, he gave his assent to the new design.

The day that the Weekly moved into the new building, a neighbor walked into the offices bleeding from his artery and asking for assistance, he had gotten cut after punching out his own window at the crack house across the street from the building. The newly hired receptionist quit her job that same day.

Their new logo, nicknamed the BIG LOGO, was introduced in 1993.

In 1995, the Weekly began printing their annual awards magazine entitled Best of Monterey Bay Visitor's Guide.

Also in 1995, the Monterey County Herald published an expose in which they captured photographs of the Weekly's sales staff attending a tennis game using comped tickets that were intended for their clientele, and they were fired soon after.

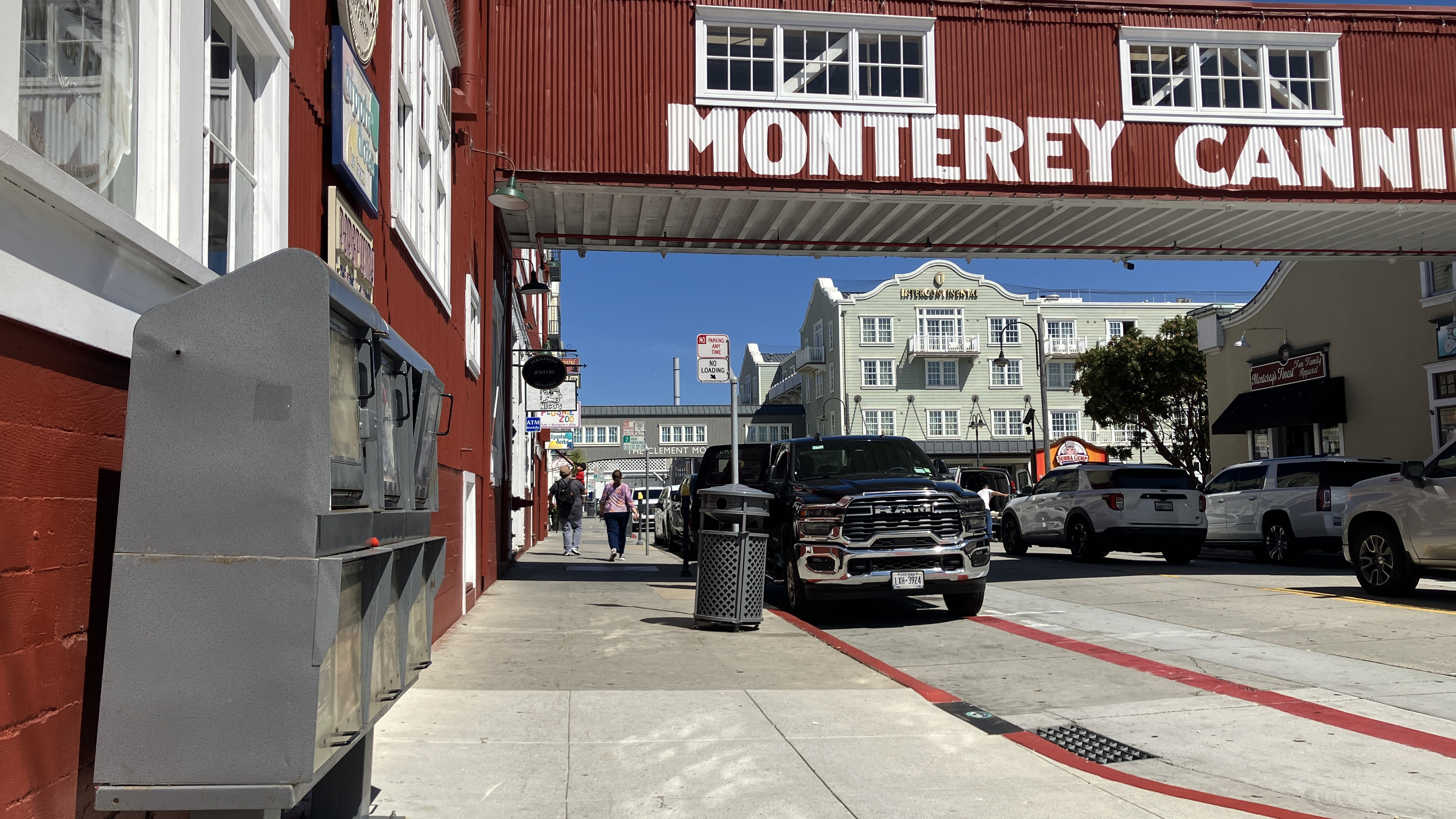
Newspaper dispenser (left) on Cannery Row in New Monterey. The Monterey Bay Aquarium is seen in the distance. Paid newspapers like the San Francisco Chronicle and the Monterey Herald no longer distribute to this location, but the Weekly occupies the center box on the top row.

The Coast Weekly began publishing online, as well as in print, in 1996. They were the first newspaper in Monterey County to publish online.

The headquarters building was remodeled again in 1997, expanding into the building next door.

Erik Cushman became publisher of the Weekly in 1999.

In 2002, the Weekly began publishing the program of the Monterey Jazz Festival.

While its reporting is almost entirely local, Coast Weekly was the only newspaper in the alternative press to send a reporter – Jim Cole – to the middle east to cover both the Desert Storm war in the early 1990s and the Iraq war in early 2003.

=== Monterey County Weekly (2004–Present) ===
On February 11, 2004, Coast Weekly changed its name to the Monterey County Weekly. This rebranding continued into 2005 and 2006, where the newspaper was completely redesigned and the logo was slightly modified.

The headquarters was remodeled again in 2007. In 2007, they installed their first solar panels, and by 2008, they were 100% solar powered. In 2009, the building earned LEED certification, and was recognized as the first newspaper in the United States to generate 100% of its electricity by the sun. That statement only applies to the headquarters building, and not their printing presses.

In 2007, the website was relaunched after a full year of web redesign.

From 2004 to 2019, Bradley Zeve served as the Free Speech chair for AAN.

=== Philanthropic wing ===
The Weekly established the Monterey County Weekly Community Fund at the Community Foundation for Monterey County in 2000, and launched Monterey County Gives! in partnership with CFMC in 2009. The Monterey Peninsula Foundation became a key partner in 2018. The fund has raised and donated over $82.7 million to more than 600 local nonprofits, in partnership with the Community Foundation, the Monterey Peninsula Foundation, Neumeier Poma Investment Council, Cannery Row Company, the David and Lucile Packard Foundation and the Posey Family Foundation. The annual campaign runs from mid-November to midnight December 31.

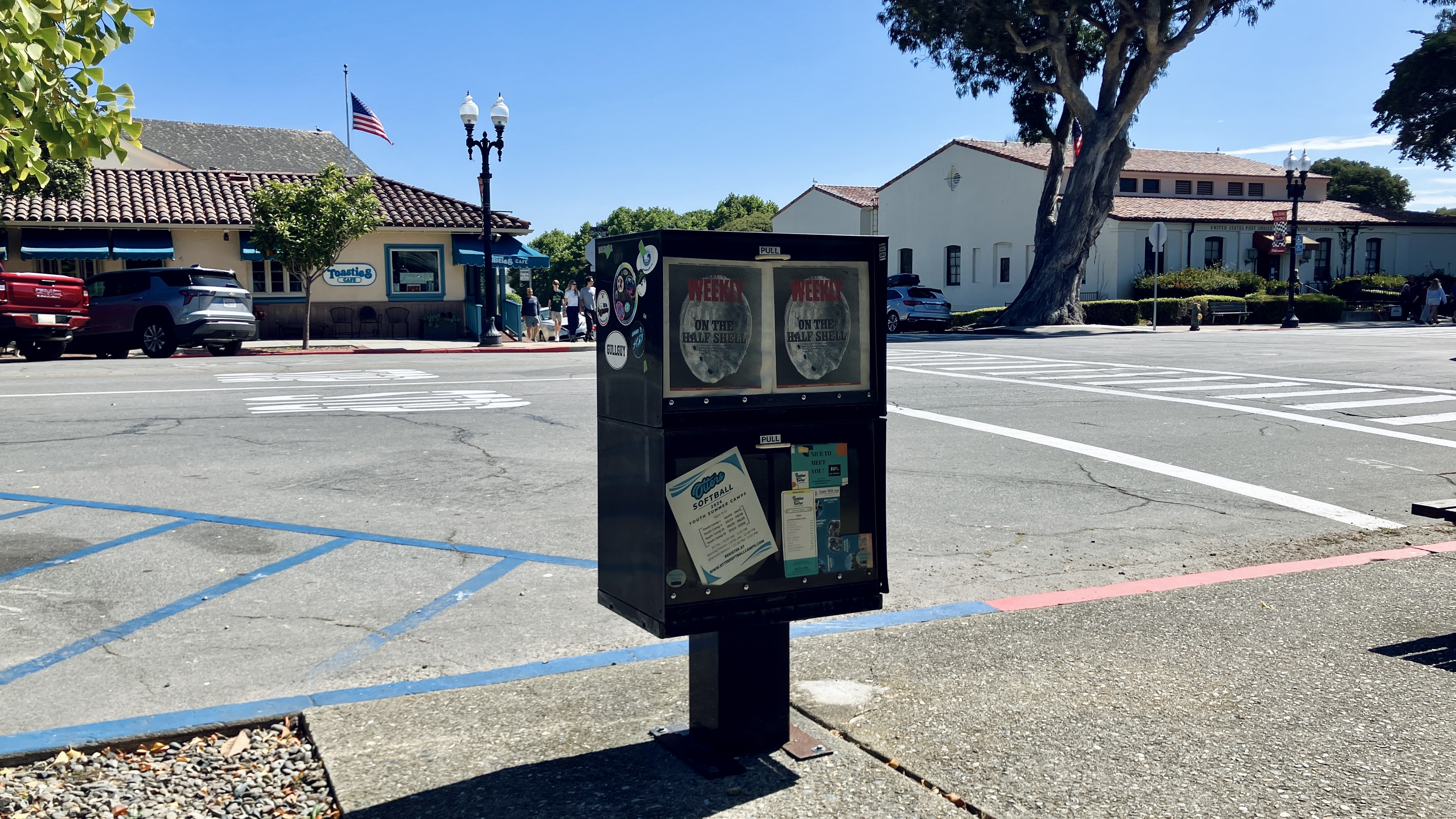
A free newspaper dispenser in downtown Pacific Grove. The Pacific Grove Post Office is across the street on the right of frame.

== Awards ==
The paper has won over 100 local, regional, state or national editorial awards for editorial content, design and photography. Monterey County Weekly was awarded General Excellence for large circulation weekly newspapers by the California Newspaper Publishers Association (2012, runner-up 2013) and the 2015 Free Speech & Open Government award from the First Amendment Coalition.

Recipient of the First Amendment Coalition Free Speech & Open Government Award (2015) and Association of Alternative Newsmedia Free Speech Award (2016).
