= Villaverde =

Villaverde may refer to:

== Places ==
=== Italy ===
- Villa Verde, Sardinia

=== Philippines ===
- Villaverde, Nueva Vizcaya
- Pangasinan–Nueva Vizcaya Road (Also known as Villaverde or Villa Verde Trail)

=== Spain ===
Andalusia

- Villaverde del Río

Asturias

- Villaverde (Allande)
- Villaverde (Villaviciosa)

Basque Country

- Villaverde, Álava

Cantabria

- Valle de Villaverde, formerly Villaverde de Trucíos

Castile and León

- Villaverde de Arcayos
- Villaverde de Guareña
- Villaverde de Íscar
- Villaverde de Medina
- Villaverde de Montejo
- Villaverde del Monte
- Villaverde-Mogina

Castilla-La Mancha

- Villaverde de Guadalimar
- Villaverde y Pasaconsol

La Rioja

- Villaverde de Rioja

Community of Madrid

- Villaverde (Madrid)
  - Villaverde San Andrés, Spanish professional football club based in Villaverde, Madrid
- Villaverde Alto (Madrid)
  - Villaverde Alto (Madrid Metro)

=== United States ===
- Villa Verde (Pasadena, California), listed on the U.S. National Register of Historic Places

== People ==
- Villaverde (surname)

== Others ==
- Count of Villaverde, noble and hereditary title
- CD Oroquieta Villaverde, Spanish women's football club
