= William C. Sullivan =

Federal Bureau of Investigation official

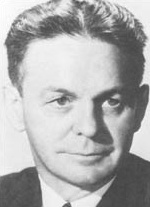
- Sullivan in 1965
- Born: William Cornelius Sullivan; May 12, 1912; Bolton, Massachusetts, US
- Died: November 9, 1977 (aged 65); Sugar Hill, New Hampshire, US
- Cause of death: Gunshot wound
- Burial place: St. Michael Cemetery in Hudson, Massachusetts
- Education: American University; George Washington University
- Occupation: Head of FBI intelligence
- Years active: 1941–1972
- Employer: Federal Bureau of Investigation
- Known for: CPUSA and COINTELPRO investigations
- Political party: Democrat
- Spouse: Marion Hawkes

William Cornelius Sullivan (May 12, 1912 – November 9, 1977) was an assistant director of the Federal Bureau of Investigation who was in charge of the agency's domestic intelligence operations from 1961 to 1971. Sullivan was forced out of the FBI at the end of September 1971 due to disagreements with FBI director J. Edgar Hoover. The following year, Sullivan was appointed as the head of the Justice Department's new Office of National Narcotics Intelligence, which he led from June 1972 to July 1973. Sullivan died in a hunting accident in 1977. His memoir of his thirty-year career in the FBI, written with journalist Bill Brown, was published posthumously by W. W. Norton & Company in 1979.

Sullivan led the highly controversial COINTELPRO aimed at surveilling, infiltrating, discrediting, and disrupting domestic American political organizations, political opposition and civil rights movements, which were, among other things, assassinated, imprisoned, publicly humiliated or falsely charged with crimes.

== Background ==
William Cornelius Sullivan was born on May 12, 1912, in the small town of Bolton, Massachusetts. His parents were farmers in the area who worked a family farm there for fifty years. Sullivan later recounted that growing up in Bolton was a life without modern conveniences, including public transportation, school buses, telephone, mail service, or even electricity. Sullivan graduated from Hudson High School in neighboring Hudson and held advanced degrees from American University and George Washington University.

== Career ==
Upon graduation, Sullivan worked for a time as an English teacher in Bolton before entering the civil service as an employee of the Internal Revenue Service (IRS) in the agency's Boston office.

=== FBI ===
On July 3, 1941, Sullivan received a letter from Federal Bureau of Investigation (FBI) director J. Edgar Hoover offering him a position as special agent with the Bureau. Anticipating war in Europe, the young Sullivan had been working for the IRS prior to taking the FBI examination. He reported to the Department of Justice on August 4 of that year for training as an FBI agent.

There were two different sorts of agent trainees, Sullivan later recalled, those who had joined the FBI as clerks straight out of high school, when they were young, impressionable, and able to be trained to be fanatically loyal to the bureau and its leaders; and those like Sullivan who had graduated from college and developed a professional skill-set before enlisting with the bureau. "The pressure on a trainee to conform was unremitting," Sullivan remembered, with those questioning FBI policies or violating agency rules quickly funneled out of the system. In addition, ideological homogeneity was reinforced by the universal recruitment of Anglo-Saxon candidates, with African-Americans, Jews, and Hispanics excluded from the training program as a matter of official policy.

Sullivan successfully completed his training and on September 26, 1941, was assigned to the FBI's field office in Milwaukee, Wisconsin. In accordance with the bureau's policy at that time, Sullivan was moved from field office to field office during his first year on the job, being transferred to El Paso, Texas in January 1942, where he was mentored by Charles B. Winstead, the FBI special agent who had killed bank robber John Dillinger.

=== Break with Hoover ===
Sullivan was depicted as a realist by journalist Bill Brown, who collaborated with Sullivan in writing his posthumously published memoir, declaring at the time of their first meeting in 1968 that "only a tiny handful" of anti–Vietnam War protesters had ever had contact with foreign communist parties and that the American Communist Party was "no longer important". Calling Sullivan "a short, neat man who spoke logically and clearly," Brown likened Sullivan's demeanor to that of tough guy actor James Cagney, "with a New England accent thrown in."

Sullivan claimed Hoover's concerns about the American Communist Party were overemphasized when compared to violations of federal civil rights laws in the segregated South. This friction worsened as Sullivan made his opinions public. Many FBI insiders considered Sullivan the logical successor to Hoover. However, on October 1, 1971, Hoover abruptly had the locks changed on Sullivan's door and removed his nameplate. Under the circumstances, Sullivan was forced to retire.

Sullivan then became even more vocal about Hoover's controversial domestic counterintelligence programs, collectively labeled COINTELPRO, including operations that he himself had conceived and administered. These were intended to spread confusion and dissension among political groups in the United States ranging from the Communist Party (CPUSA), Civil Rights Movement, and anti–Vietnam War movement on the left to the Ku Klux Klan on the far right.

Sullivan described the frameup of party leader William Albertson in a June 30, 1964, internal document filed by him and fellow FBI agent Fred J. Baumgardner:

My memorandum dated 6/12/64 was approved, authorizing a unique counterintelligence operation calculated to cast suspicion on Communist Party (CP) National Committee member and Executive Secretary of the New York District Organization, William Albertson. It was our intention to place Albertson in the unenviable position of being suspected as an FBI informant through the use of a planted bogus informant report prepared by the Laboratory in Albertson's handwriting on paper used by him with a ballpoint pen of the type he uses.

In 1975, Sullivan testified before the Senate Intelligence Committee, "Never once did I hear anybody, including myself raise the question, is this course of action which we have agreed upon lawful, is it legal, is it ethical or moral?"

=== Civil rights feuding ===
The "suicide letter" (one sentence fragment redacted) sent to Martin Luther King Jr.

Sullivan was instrumental in arranging for the mailing of a tape recording in 1964 to Coretta Scott King which contained secretly taped recordings of her husband Martin Luther King Jr. allegedly having relations with other women. In a memorandum, Sullivan called King "a fraud, demagogue and scoundrel". He also gave orders to track down fugitive members of the Weather Underground in the early 1970s.

Hoover had learned from the SOLO brothers, Morris and Jack Childs, who were members of the Communist Party of the United States (CPUSA), but in fact were double agents working against the Soviet Active Measures program of the KGB, that one of King's consultants, Stanley Levison, was involved with the CPUSA. Annually, the Solo brothers would travel to Moscow to pick up Soviet funding for CPUSA activities and distribute it on their return. Because such contacts suggested the civil rights movement was being co-opted by the CPUSA under the guidance of the KGB's Soviet Active Measures program, U.S. Attorney General Robert F. Kennedy ordered the tapping of King's telephone. The telephonic surveillance led to information concerning King's affairs, and the reason why Sullivan thought King unworthy of leading the movement and being "a fraud, demagogue and scoundrel." Realizing the danger to the movement, King's friend and mentor, Rev. Ralph Abernathy pleaded, on numerous occasions, that King cease and desist such behavior, as he was putting at risk the credibility of the movement.

A number of days later, Hoover called King "the most notorious liar in the country" at a press conference. It has been suggested by some that Sullivan wrote an anonymous letter to King calling him a "filthy, abnormal animal" and telling him that there "is only one thing left for you to do".

President Lyndon Johnson, not questioning the reason for Hoover's statement but realizing the political impact for the next election, forced Hoover to apologize. Hoover and King did meet at FBI Headquarters, but no one knows what happened. Some sources claim that Hoover had all of King's files and telephone transcripts on his desk. Ultimately, it was Sullivan who was responsible for gathering all the information on King.

After Hoover's death in May 1972, U.S. Attorney General Richard Kleindienst appointed Sullivan director of the newly created Office of National Narcotics Intelligence under the Department of Justice in June 1972. Sullivan had hoped to replace Hoover as the director of the FBI, but was passed over by President Richard Nixon in favor of loyalist L. Patrick Gray.

== Personal life and death ==
Sullivan married Marion Hawkes.

William C. Sullivan died age 65 on November 9, 1977, from an accidental gunshot wound, as recounted by Robert D. Novak:

Sullivan came to our house in the Maryland suburbs in June 1972 for lunch and a long conversation about my plans for a biography of Hoover (a project I abandoned as just too ambitious an undertaking). Before he left, Bill told me someday I probably would read about his death in some kind of accident, but not to believe it. It would be murder.
On November 9, 1977, days before he was to testify to the House Select Committee on Assassinations, twenty minutes before sunrise, sixty-five-year-old Sullivan was walking through the woods near his retirement home in Sugar Hill, New Hampshire, on the way to meet hunting companions. Another hunter, Robert Daniels, Jr., a twenty-two-year-old son of a state policeman, using a telescopic sight on a .30 caliber rifle, said he mistook Sullivan for a deer, shot him in the neck, and killed him instantly.
The authorities called it an accident, fining Daniels five hundred dollars and taking away his hunting license for ten years. Sullivan's collaborator on his memoir, the television news writer Bill Brown, wrote that he and Sullivan's family were convinced that the death was accidental.
Sullivan's death did not prevent publication of the memoir, telling all about the disgrace of J. Edgar Hoover and the FBI. After Watergate, with all the principals dead or out of office, it received little attention.

Sullivan is buried in his family's plot at St. Michael Cemetery in Hudson, Massachusetts, with his wife, as well as his parents, sister and other relatives.

== Works ==
- "Freedom is the Exception": Three Lectures on the Values of the Open Society. Cambridge, MA: Harvard University, 1964.
- The Bureau: My Thirty Years in Hoover's FBI. (with Bill Brown) New York: W.W. Norton & Co., 1979. ISBN 9780393012361
- "The Need to Teach About Communism in Our Schools."
- "World Communism: Strategy and Tactics."
- "The University, Communism and the Community: An Address at Southern Methodist University, Dallas, Texas, October 18, 1961."

== See also ==
- Robert J. Lamphere

== Additional sources ==
- "William C. Sullivan, Ex-F.B.I. Aide, 65, Is Killed in a Hunting Accident". The New York Times, November 10, 1977. p. 94.
- Athan G. Theoharis, Tony G. Poveda, Susan Rosenfeld, and Richard Gid Powers, The FBI: A Comprehensive Reference Guide. 1999. ISBN 9780897749916. OCLC 925107105.
