= Office of National Narcotics Intelligence =

United States federal law enforcement agency

The Office of National Narcotics Intelligence (ONNI) was a United States federal law enforcement agency under the Justice Department, founded in August 1972 by order of President Richard M. Nixon. It analyzed illegal drug use and was tasked to develop a National Narcotics Intelligence System, conducting analysis only with no operational responsibilities. Liaisons were established with the CIA and NSA. The agency was headed by former FBI Assistant to the Director (third position in FBI after director and deputy director) William C. Sullivan until the ONNI was consolidated in July 1973 into the new Drug Enforcement Administration (along with the Bureau of Narcotics and Dangerous Drugs, the Office of Drug Abuse Law Enforcement, and some Customs officers).

Waldo H. Dubberstein, who worked in ONNI's Analysis Division and was previously head of CIA analysis for the Middle East and South Asia, was later employed by the DIA and committed suicide in April 1983 after being indicted for selling classified DIA intelligence reports to Libya from 1977 to 1980.

== Sources ==
- Agency of Fear: Opiates and Political Power in America by Edward J. Epstein, 1977, ISBN 0399116567
- The Great Heroin Coup: Drugs, Intelligence, & International Fascism by Henrik Kruger, et al., 2016 updated ed., ISBN 1634240189
