= Lutheran Church – Canada =

Confessional Lutheran denomination in Canada

Lutheran Church–Canada
- Église luthérienne du Canada
- Classification: Protestant
- Orientation: Lutheran
- Theology: Confessional Lutheran
- Structure: National Synod; 3 regions; local congregations
- President: Rev. David Haberstock
- Associations: International Lutheran Council
- Origin: 1988
- Branched from: Lutheran Church – Missouri Synod
- Congregations: 268
- Members: 44,790 (2023)
- Ministers: 352 pastors; 55 deacons
- Publications: The Canadian Lutheran
- Official website: lutheranchurchcanada.ca

Lutheran Church–Canada (LCC) is a confessional Lutheran denomination in Canada. It is the 2nd largest Lutheran church body in Canada as of 2023, with a baptized membership of 44,790. Together with the Evangelical Lutheran Church in Canada and the Canadian Association of Lutheran Congregations, it is one of only three all-Canadian Lutheran denominations. LCC was founded in 1988 when Canadian congregations of the St. Louis–based Lutheran Church – Missouri Synod (LCMS) formed an autonomous church body with a synodical office in Winnipeg, Manitoba. LCC has no substantial theological divisions from LCMS and the two church bodies are in full altar and pulpit fellowship with each other.

== History ==
Lutheranism in Canada dates back to Danish explorers in 1619 and German settlers in Nova Scotia in 1749, the latter encouraged to populate the territory by George II of Great Britain; a first church was raised in Halifax in 1752. As Canadian settlement spread west, Ontarian congregations followed in the late 1700s, Manitoban ones in the 1800s, and Albertan ones in the early 1900s. For two centuries Lutheran churches in Canada tended to be organized under shifting arrangements of sponsorship from various American synods and conferences until coalescing into LCMS in 1958 and ELCIC in 1967, and from 1958 to 1988 LCC existed as a federated group under the LCMS umbrella.

Following its independent establishment in January 1988, LCC created three districts: The Alberta-British Columbia (ABC) District, with offices in Edmonton, Alberta; the Central District, in Winnipeg, Manitoba; and the East District, in Kitchener, Ontario. At present LCC has a congregational roster of 58 churches in British Columbia; 78 in Alberta; 62 in Saskatchewan; 20 in Manitoba; 124 in Ontario; 11 in Quebec; 1 in New Brunswick; and 2 in Nova Scotia; one in Prince Edward Island. Services are variously offered in English, German, Spanish, French, and Korean. Sixteen Canadian congregations – one in Montreal, and the rest in Ontario – remain affiliated with the LCMS in either of that body's non-geographic districts, namely the SELC District or the English District.

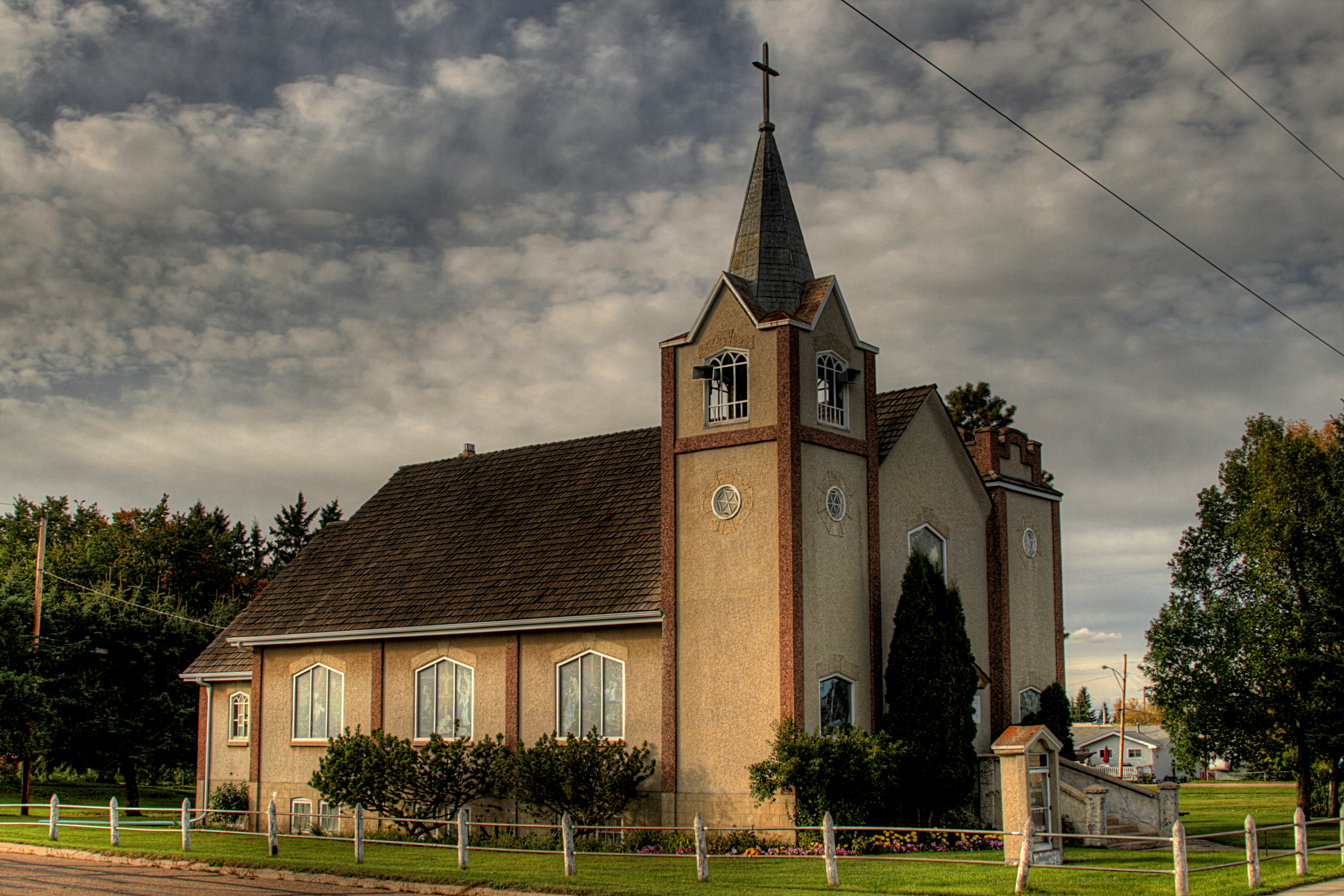
Bethlehem Lutheran Church, Bruderheim, Alberta

On July 5, 2015, the Alberta-British Columbia (ABC) District announced it had a "sufficient cash flow shortage". The district's Church Extension Fund (CEF), which was originally instituted in order to provide low-interest loans to congregations, was insolvent. The ABC District entered Companies' Creditors Arrangement Act (CCAA) (bankruptcy protection) on January 23, 2015. Estimates are that the ABC District's church extension fund was underfunded by between C$60M and C$80M dollars. Because of poor administrative practices, many key records have not been found. Several lawsuits to determine the ownership of various congregation properties have been the result.

On August 13, 2018, the Alberta Securities Commission convened a hearing and set 32 days of hearings in May 2019 to explore the merits of the allegations. The hearings are intended to clarify multiple securities allegations against The Alberta British - Columbia District and five former leaders including Rev. Donald Robert Schiemann (District President), Kurtis Francis Robinson (Financial Executive), James Theodore Kentel (chairman, Board of Directors), Rev. Mark David Ruf (First Vice-president), Harold Carl Schmidt (Board of Directors). The Alberta Securities Commission "Staff allege that each of the Respondents breached, or authorized, permitted, or acquiesced in the breach of section 92(4.1) of the Act", and that "they knew or ought to have known did not state all of the facts required to be stated to make the statements not misleading, and which would reasonably be expected to have a significant effect on the market price or value of the securities distributed by the District and DIL".

On September 12, 2019, the Calgary Herald reported that, "The Alberta Securities Commission has reached a settlement with the Lutheran Church–Canada, the Alberta-British Columbia District and others in connection with an investment program that collapsed into insolvency in 2015.

In the settlement agreement, the parties admitted to breaching Alberta securities laws by making statements “they knew or ought to have known did not state all of the facts required,” as stated in a release from the ASC.

A side-effect of the financial collapse of the Alberta-British Columbia District is that LCC decided to restructure the national church body. As a result, the ABC District, Central District, and East District were dissolved into one national synod effective January 2, 2019.

== Doctrines ==
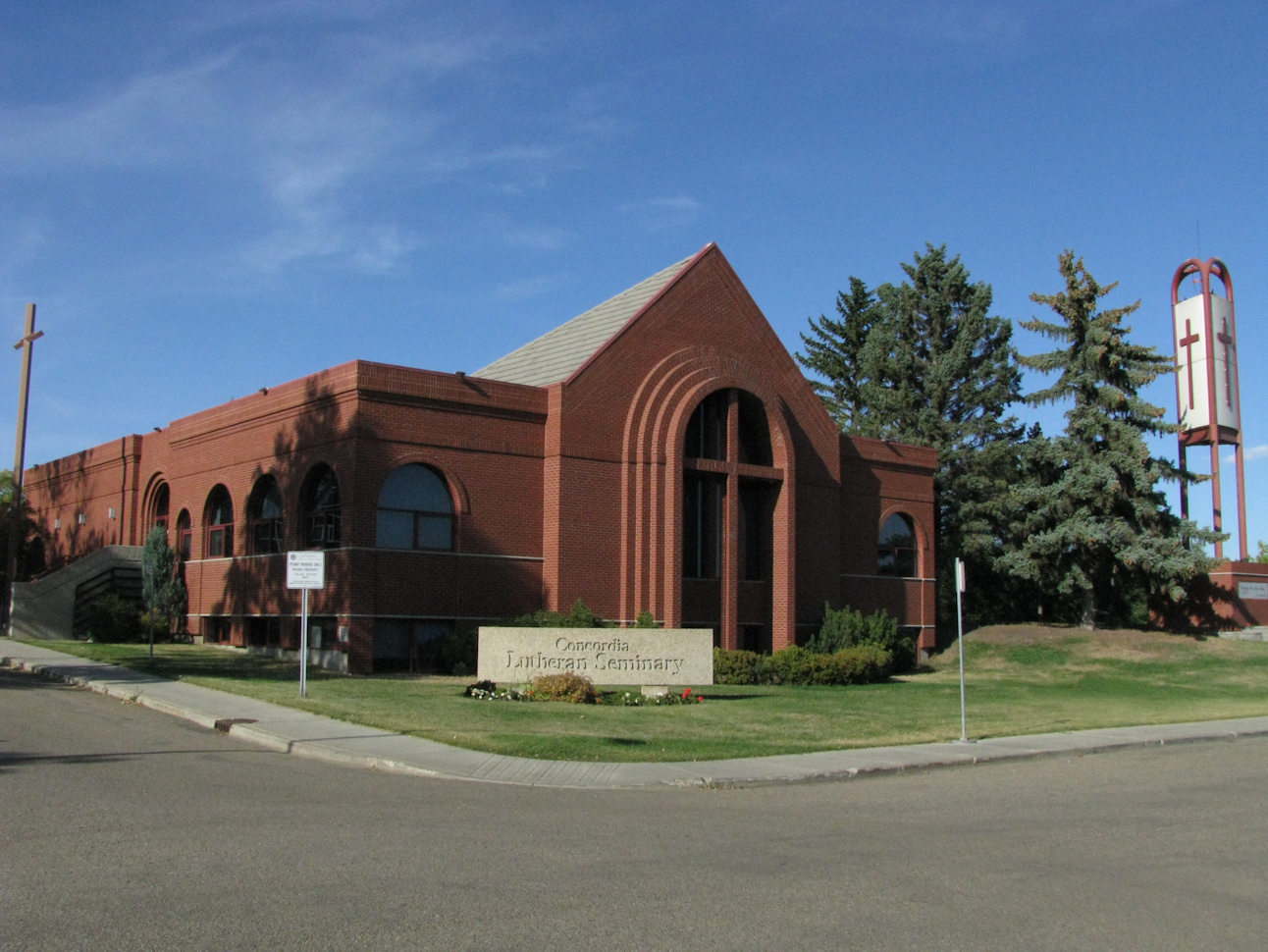
The Concordia Lutheran Seminary in Edmonton, Alberta

Like other confessional Lutheran bodies, LCC believes the Bible is the inerrant and inspired Word of God. It accepts the Lutheran Confessions as contained in the Book of Concord because they are a faithful expression of the Scriptures. LCC practices closed communion, viewing communion as an intimate act shared only with other Christians who subscribe to LCC's doctrines. LCC practices infant baptism and normally requires confirmation instruction for full congregational participation. The church body is in communion with some member synods of the International Lutheran Council (e.g. LCMS). Many LCC congregations use the Lutheran Service Book as their hymnal.

While LCC churches do not permit women in ministerial roles, women serve in elected or appointed lay offices in churches, such as teachers and deaconesses.

== Activities ==
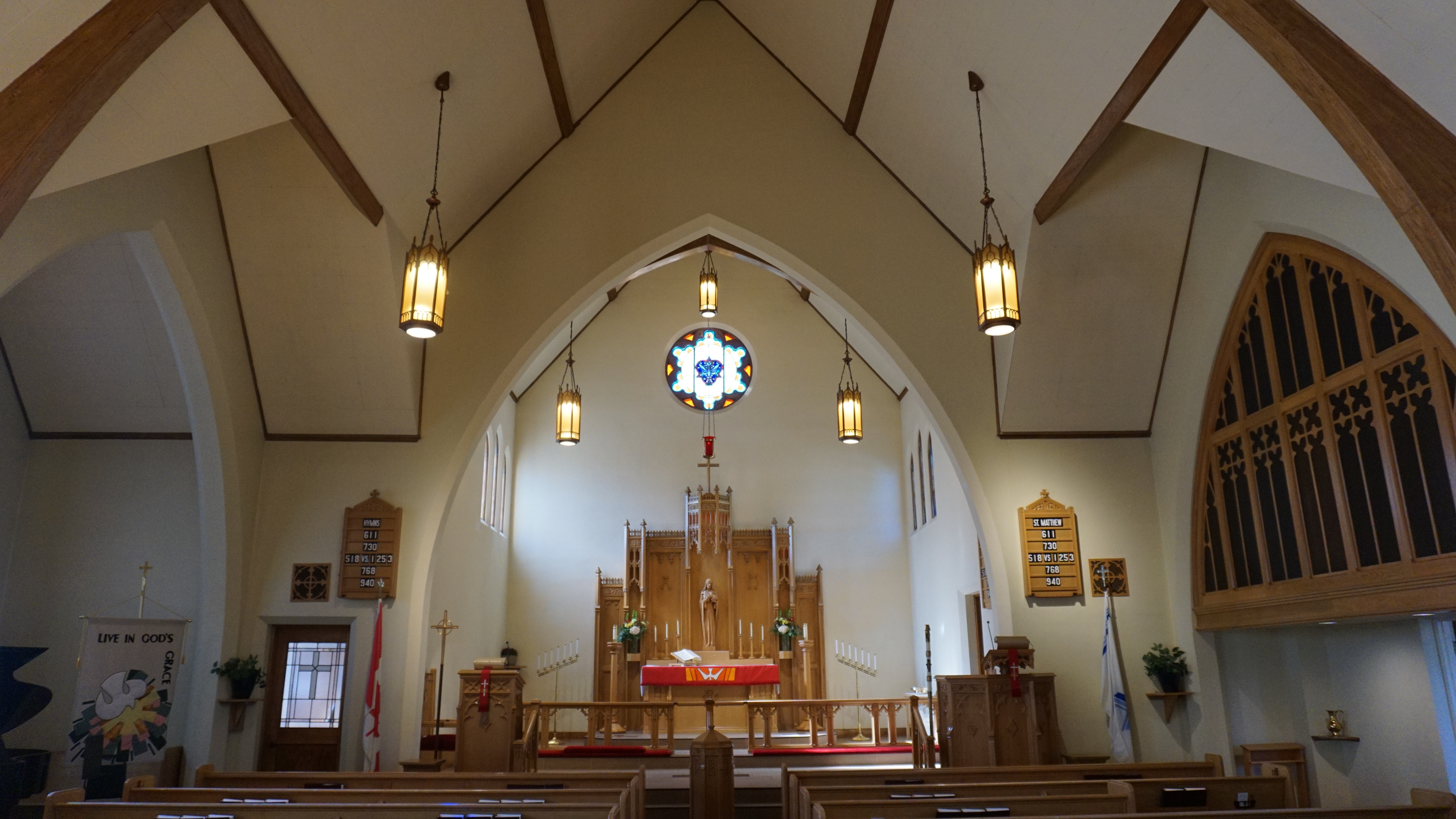
Interior of the Redeemer Lutheran Church - Waterloo, Ontario

The church body has two seminaries established for the training of pastors, Concordia Lutheran Theological Seminary in St. Catharines, Ontario (opened 1976), and Concordia Lutheran Seminary in Edmonton, Alberta (opened 1984).

Concordia University of Edmonton is an independent university in Edmonton established by the Lutheran Church – Missouri Synod in 1921 to train Lutheran pastors. It became an auxiliary of LCC in 1988 and remained so until 2010. Concordia provided training programs for church workers until their suspension in 2015. Concordia as of November 2015 is no longer Lutheran in its outlook or affiliations. In the mid-20th century, health care initiatives also grew with the establishment of auxiliary hospitals and senior citizens' homes under LCC auspices, as well as military and prison chaplaincies.

The official archive of Lutheran Church–Canada, the underlying districts, and auxiliaries was the Lutheran Historical Institute, Edmonton. It closed in August 2015 after Concordia University of Edmonton and the Alberta British Columbia District of the LCC refused to provide funding. This occurred due to administrative and financial irregularities within Lutheran entities.

LCC is involved with foreign missions in Nicaragua, where work begun in 1997, which resulted in the founding of the Lutheran Church Synod of Nicaragua (Spanish: Iglesia Luterana Sinodo de Nicaragua) in 2008; southeast Asia, where it assists in providing theological education for future pastors in Thailand and Cambodia; Venezuela; and Ukraine, where it partners with the Synod of Evangelical Lutheran Churches of Ukraine in the training of pastors at Concordia Seminary in Usatovo (near Odesa) in the southern part of the country.

== See also ==
- List of Christian denominations
