= WeRe-VaNa =

French singer-songwriter (born 1991)

Évariste Pierre Geoffroy (French pronunciation: [evaʁist pjɛʁ ʒɔfʁwa]; born December 30, 1991) known professionally as Were-Vana (French pronunciation: [wɛʁə vana]; often stylized as WeRe-VaNa) is a French singer, songwriter and producer of Guadeloupean descent. He sings in Gwo ka music mixed with modern hip hop, R'n'B and contemporary pop. His songs are both in French and Guadeloupean Creole. He released the self titled album Were Vana in 2018 and the album Îles & Elle in 2021. He was previously a member of the band Kan'nida, a band performing traditional music. Then he went independent performing solo. He is signed to Warner / Play Two label.

== Career ==
He was born to Rene Geoffrey, a mechanic and a singer and player of a number of instruments, and Agnès, an accountant. He was an avid footballer throughout his youth. In 2017, he released "Kompwan sé jé". But his release of "Casanova" on 9 November 2020 became WeRe-VaNa's first major hit on the French SNEP charts. It entered the French official singles chart in mid-February 2021 peaking at number 16 on the SNEP chart. Until the end of August 2021, it had spent 27 weeks on the French Top 200. It was released on Play Two, a French affiliate label for Warner Music. It was certified platinum and enjoyed more than 30 million streams. Following the success of "Casanova", he released his album Îles & Elle on 20 August 2021. The follow-up singles to "Casanova" are "Bombardé" and "Cache cache" both accompanied by a music video.

== Discography ==
=== Albums ===
Year	Title	Peak chart positions	Certification
Year	Title	FRA	Certification
2018	Were Vana	—	
2021	Îles & Elle	61	

=== Singles ===
Year	Title	Peak chart positions	Album
Year	Title	FRA	Album
2017	"Kompwan sé jé" (feat. Methi's)	—	L'année du Zouk 2017 (compilation album)
2019	"Voleur de coeur"	—	
2020	"Casanova"	16	
2021	"Bombardé"	122	
2021	"Cache cache"	—	
