= Concordia Lutheran Seminary =

Lutheran seminary in Edmonton, Alberta, Canada

- Type: Seminary
- Established: 1984
- Affiliations: Lutheran Church–Canada, ATS, ILC
- President: Joel Heck
- Faculty: 3
- Students: 8
- Location: 7040 Ada Boulevard; Edmonton, Alberta, Canada; T5B 4E3; 53.559°N 113.443°W
- Campus: Residential
- Colors: Blue & Gold
- Website: www.concordiasem.ab.ca

Concordia Lutheran Seminary (CLS) is a Lutheran seminary situated on the north bank of the North Saskatchewan River in Edmonton, Alberta, Canada. The seminary is located near the campus of Concordia University of Edmonton, and is part of the Lutheran Church – Canada (LCC).

== History ==
In 1981, the convention of the Lutheran Church – Missouri Synod (LCMS) authorized its Canadian districts that would ultimately become the Lutheran Church – Canada to determine what seminaries would be needed when the LCC became a separate denomination. The LCC decided that in addition to Concordia Lutheran Theological Seminary in St. Catharines, Ontario, which had been founded already in 1976 by the LCMS, a seminary was also needed in the western part of the country.

The Board of Regents for the new seminary first met in September 1983, and a charter from the province of Alberta was granted on May 31, 1984. The first day of classes was held on September 10, 1984, with a faculty consisting of a professor of history theology and one of exegetical theology, and a student body consisting of six in Year 1 and four in Year 2. The seminary also took over the supervision of three Year 3 students who were serving vicarages (internships) in congregations. Classes were conducted in a house rented from Concordia College that had previously served as faculty housing and as a women's dorm.

In 1987, CLS began making plans for a new permanent seminary building. It also applied to the Association of Theological Schools (ATS) for accreditation, and received associate membership in June 1990. The seminary moved into temporary quarters at Grace Lutheran Church in Edmonton for the 1990–91 school year while the new building was under construction. Dedication of the new building occurred on September 2, 1991. By that time, the faculty had grown to include five professors.

Concordia Lutheran Seminary has been accredited by the ATS since May 29, 1998. It publishes the Lutheran Theological Review in conjunction with Concordia Lutheran Theological Seminary.

== Presidents ==
CLS has had six presidents since its founding, not counting interim presidents:

- W. Th. Janzow (1983–1987)
- Milton Rudnick (1987–1992)
- L. Dean Hempelmann (1993–1999)
- Arthur Bacon (2000–2005)
- Manfred Zeuch (2007–2011)
- James Gimbel (2014–2023)
- Jonathan Kraemer (2025–present)
