= New Monterey, Monterey =

New Monterey
- Neighborhood
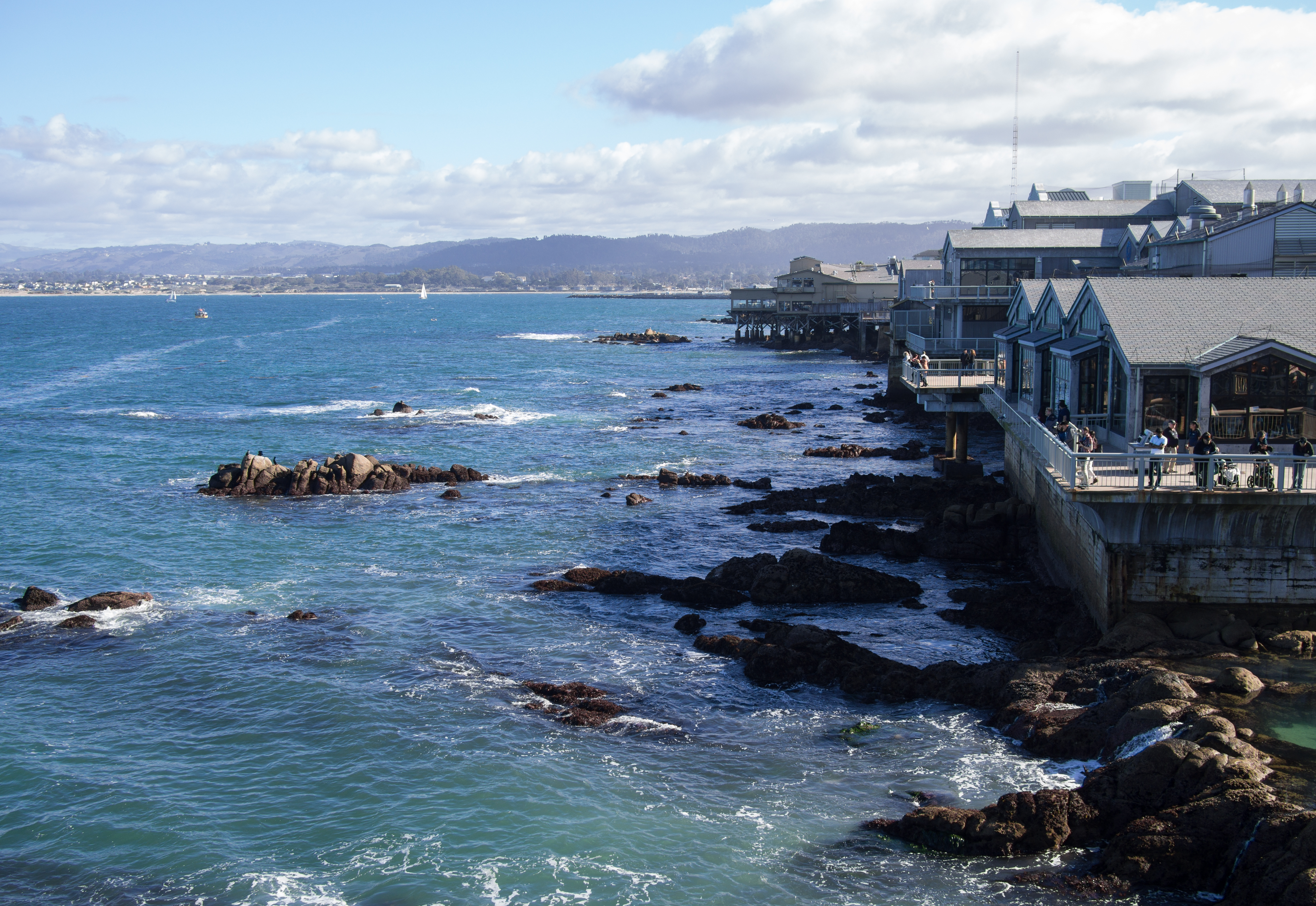
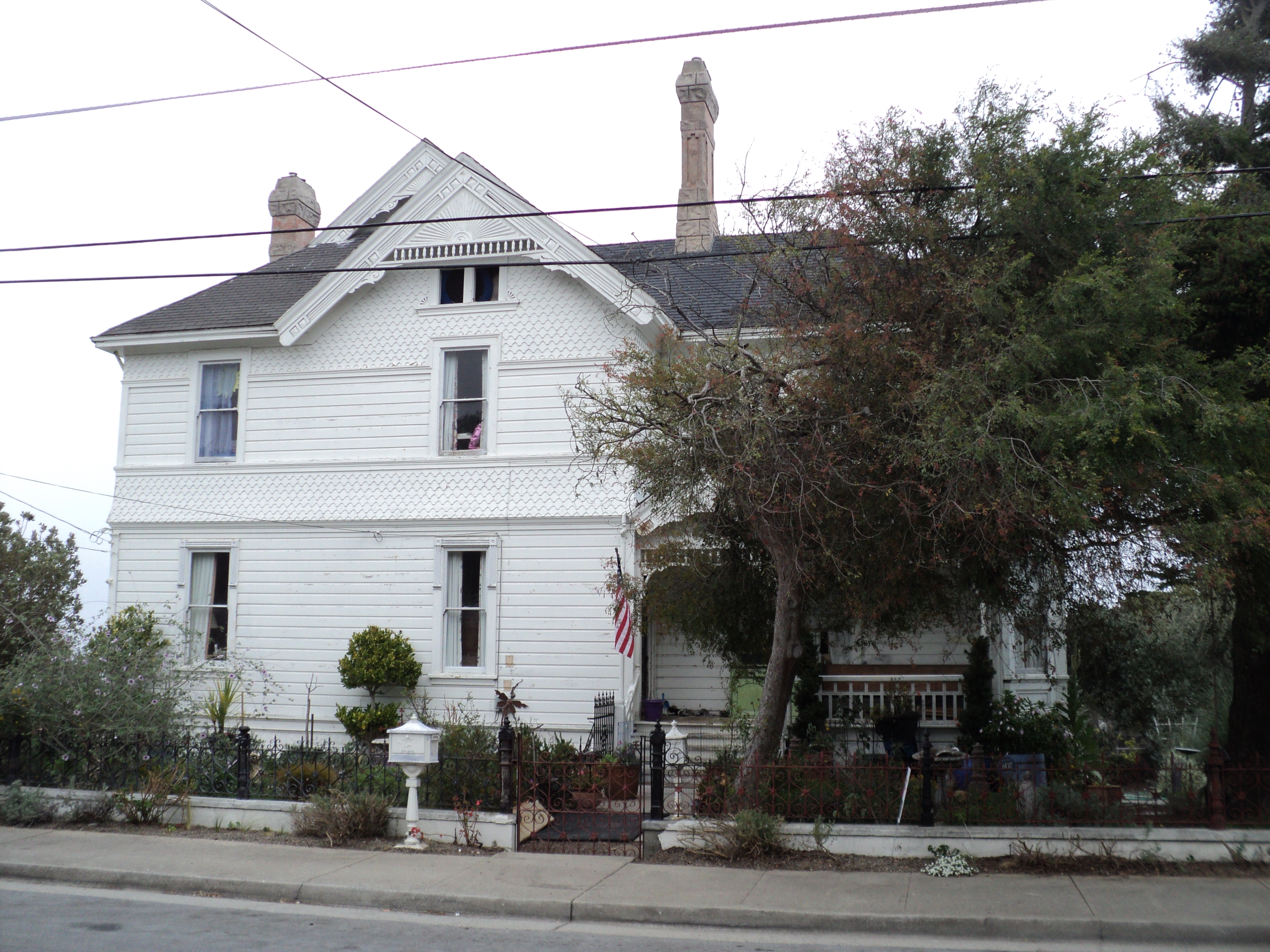
- Clockwise from top left: Sky view of New Monterey's Cannery Row; Waterfront view of the Monterey Bay Aquarium; Historic Lou Ellen Parmelee House; Nightlife in Cannery Row
- Interactive map of New Monterey
- Official neighborhood boundary map of Monterey, adopted 2021.
- Country: United States
- State: California
- County: Monterey County
- City: Monterey
- Elevation: 56 ft (17 m)

New Monterey is a neighborhood of Monterey, California. Formerly, it was an unincorporated community that was later incorporated in the city of Monterey. It is located north of the Presidio of Monterey, at an elevation of 56 feet (17 m). Monterey's famous Cannery Row is located in New Monterey. The New Monterey post office operated from 1909 to 1913. On the other side of the Presidio lies Old Monterey, the oldest part of the city of Monterey.

== Government ==
New Monterey and Old Monterey, seen on a 1928 map of the Monterey Peninsula. Old Monterey is no longer a designated place, its old boundaries comprising modern Spaghetti Hill and Downtown Monterey.

Because New Monterey falls within the Monterey city limits, it is governed by Monterey's mayor and 4 city council members, all elected by the public. As of December 2019, the mayor is Clyde Roberson and the city council members are Dan Albert, Jr., Alan Haffa, Ed Smith, and Tyller Williamson.

At the county level, Monterey is represented on the Monterey County Board of Supervisors by Supervisor Mary Adams.

In the California State Legislature, New Monterey is in the 17th senatorial district, represented by Democrat John Laird, and in the 29th Assembly district, represented by Democrat Robert Rivas.

In the United States House of Representatives, New Monterey is in the 19th Congressional District and is represented by Democrat Jimmy Panetta, son of former California Congressman Leon Panetta.

== See also ==
- Bistro Moulin
- Cannery Row
- Monterey Bay Aquarium
