= Casanova (German band) =

Casanova was a German rock band formed by former members of the bands Mad Max, Bonfire, Warlock and the Rainbirds. The band included singer Michael Voss and Michael Eurich, of Warlock (band), and recorded the songs of Russ Ballard.

== Discography ==
Studio Albums

- Casanova (1991)
- One Night Stand (1992)
- Heroes (1999)
- All Beauty Must Die (2004)

Extended Plays

- Some Like It Different... Acoustic (1993)
- Sway (1999)

Compilations

- Ticket to the Moon (1997)

Unreleased Material

- Secretly Yours (199X)
