= Concordia Lutheran Theological Seminary =

Confessional Lutheran Seminary in Canada

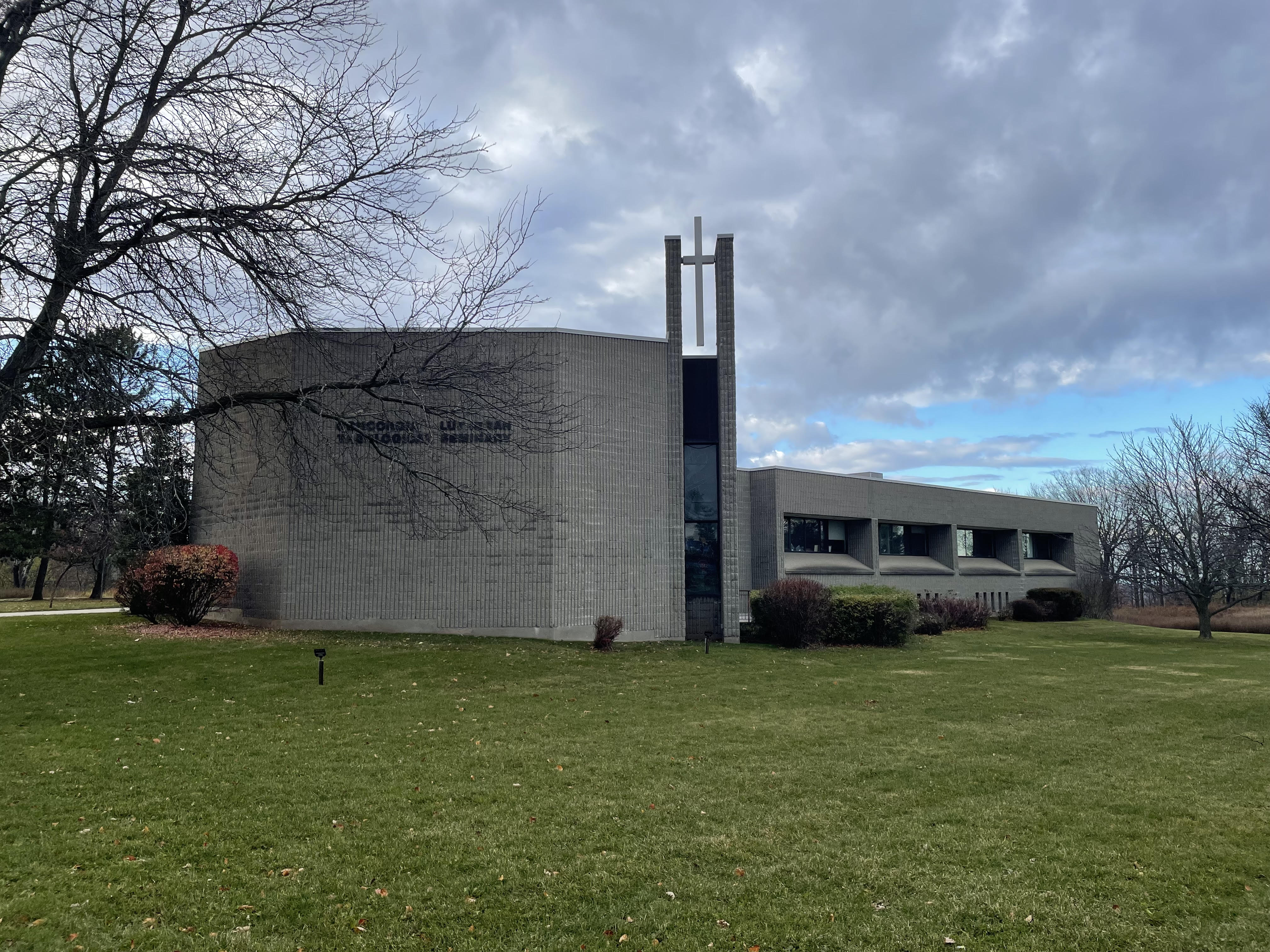
- The Concordia Lutheran Theological Seminary in November 2025
- Type: Seminary
- Established: 1976
- Religious affiliation: Lutheran Church–Canada
- Academic affiliations: ATS
- Principal: Thomas M. Winger
- Faculty: 4 full time faculty, 3 adjunct faculty
- Students: 20
- Location: St. Catharines, Ontario, Canada; 43.1218°N 79.2451°W
- Website: www.concordia-seminary.ca

Concordia Lutheran Theological Seminary (CLTS), founded in 1976, is a seminary of the Lutheran Church–Canada (LCC) on the campus of Brock University in St. Catharines, Ontario. Its primary purpose is to educate students seeking ordination in LCC, but its graduate degree programs are open to laypeople.

== History ==
Concordia was started in 1976 as an extension site for Concordia Theological Seminary, a seminary of the Lutheran Church–Missouri Synod (LCMS). At that time the LCC was part of the LCMS, not becoming an independent church body until 1988. CLTS initially used the facilities of Resurrection Lutheran Church in St. Catharines. The seminary moved to Brock University in 1983. In 2020, Resurrection Lutheran moved from its own building and began sharing the seminary building. Brock University conferred all degrees on Concordia's graduates until the seminary became a recognized private degree-granting institution in its own right in 2024.

== Programmes ==
Concordia offers a four-year Master of Divinity programme and a two-year Master of Theological Studies programme. The Divinity program, which includes one year of vicarage (parish internship) in the third year, is designed for students seeking ordination in LCC but open to others; while the Theological Studies programme is designed for laypeople.

== Governance ==
Concordia Lutheran Theological Seminary is an accredited member of the Association of Theological Schools.

== See also ==
- Higher education in Ontario
