= Michael Casanova =

Swiss footballer (born 1989)

Personal information
- Full name: Michael Casanova
- Date of birth: 4 May 1989 (age 37)
- Place of birth: Lugano, Switzerland
- Height: 1.90 m (6 ft 3 in)
- Position: Goalkeeper

Youth career
- 2001–2006: Team Ticino U-18

Senior career*
Years	Team	Apps	(Gls)
2006–2008	FC Lugano	0	(0)
2008–2010	FC Locarno	27	(0)
2010–2013	FC Lugano	4	(0)

International career
2004–2005	Switzerland U16		
2005–2006	Switzerland U17	4	(0)
2006–2007	Switzerland U18	2	(0)
2007–2008	Switzerland U19	1	(0)
2008–2009	Switzerland U20	2	(0)
- * Club domestic league appearances and goals

Michael Casanova (born 4 May 1989) is a former Swiss footballer that played as a goalkeeper.

== Career ==
He began his career with Team Ticino U-18 the youth team of Lugano and was in summer 2006 promoted to the first team. He played in the Lugano senior team his professional debut and joined the Challenge League team FC Locarno on 27 September 2008. In the summer 2009 two Super League teams, BSC Young Boys and FC Sion were interested in this player. In the summer of 2010, after a long and complicated process, he was transferred back to Lugano. But he retires in 2013 because he had problems to head after injury during a match.
