= Villaverde de Rioja =

- Municipality
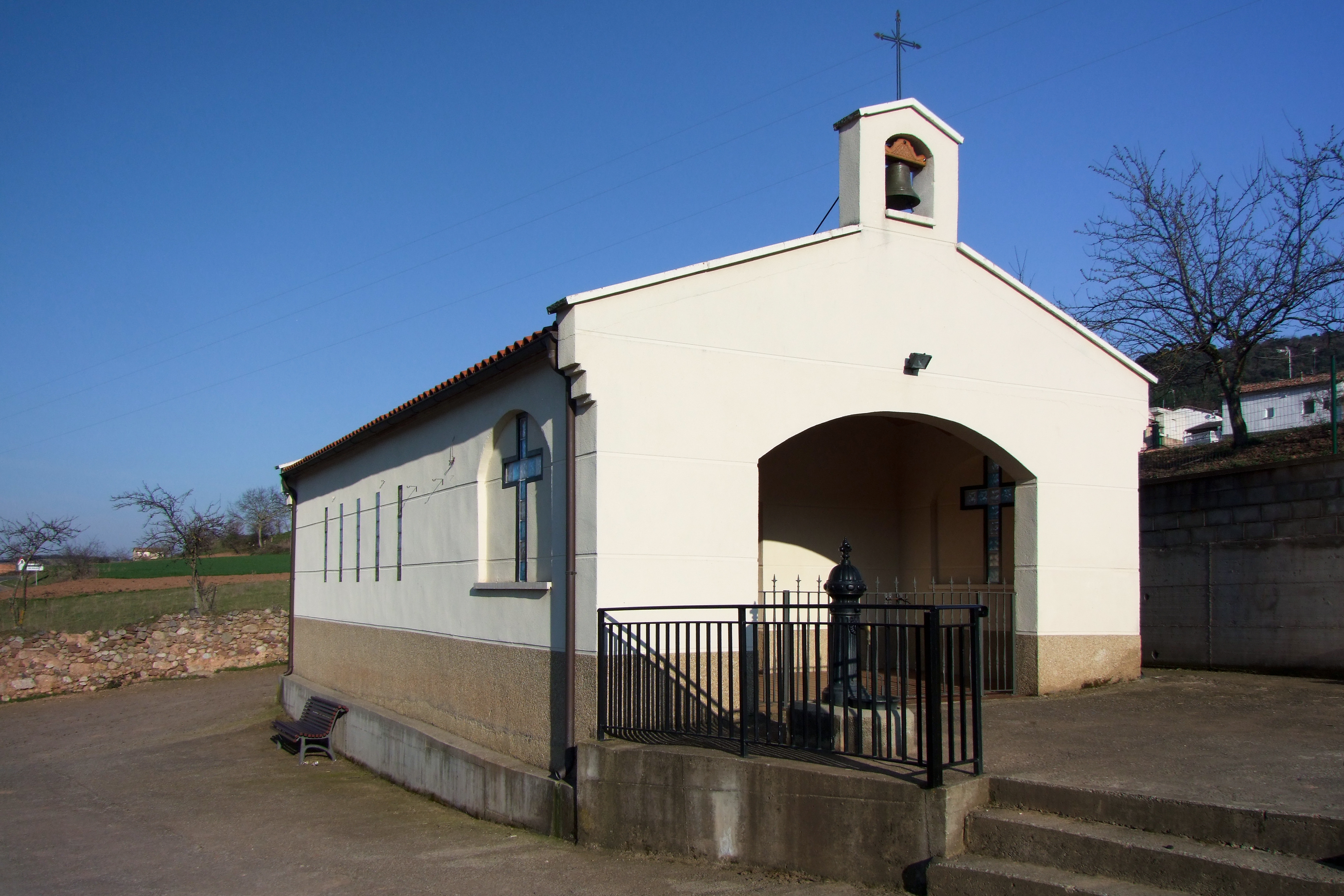

- Location within La Rioja, Spain Location within Spain
- Coordinates: 42°19′12″N 2°48′50″W
- Country: Spain
- Autonomous community: La Rioja
- Comarca: Anguiano

Government
  - Mayor: Alfredo Ojeda Tobías (PP)

Area
  - Total: 5.87 km^{2} (2.27 sq mi)
- Elevation: 810 m (2,660 ft)

Population (2025-01-01)
  - Total: 65
- Postal code: 26321
- Website: Official website

Villaverde de Rioja is a village in the province and autonomous community of La Rioja, Spain. The municipality covers an area of 5.87 square kilometres (2.27 sq mi) and as of 2011 had a population of 72 people.

== Politics ==
List of mayors since the democratic elections of 1979
Term	Mayor	Political party
1979–1983	Alfredo Ojeda Tobías	UCD
1983–1987	Alfredo Ojeda Tobías	AP
1987–1991	Alfredo Ojeda Tobías	AP
1991–1995	Alfredo Ojeda Tobías	PP
1995–1999	Alfredo Ojeda Tobías	PP
1999–2003	Alfredo Ojeda Tobías	PP
2003–2007	Alfredo Ojeda Tobías	PP
2007–2011	Alfredo Ojeda Tobías	PP
2011–2015	Alfredo Ojeda Tobías	PP
2015–2019	Alfredo Ojeda Tobías	PP
2019–2023	n/d	n/d
2023–	n/d	n/d
