= Casanova (WeRe-VaNa song) =

Single by WeRe-VaNa

- Single cover for "Casanova"

Single by WeRe-VaNa
- Released: 9 November 2020
- Recorded: 2020
- Length: 2:52
- Label: Play Two, Warner Music

WeRe-VaNa singles chronology
"Casanova" (2020)	"Bombardé" (2021)

Music video
- "Casanova" on YouTube

"Casanova" is a single by French singer songwriter and producer WeRe-VaNa of Guadeloupe origin whose real name is Évariste Geoffroy and sings in Gwo ka music mixed with modern hip hop, R'n'B and contemporary pop. He was a member of the band Kan'nida, a band performing traditional music.

"Casanova" was released on 9 November 2020 and became WeRe-VaNa's first major hit on the French charts. It entered the French official singles chart in mid-February 2021 peaking at number 16 on the SNEP chart. Until the end of August 2021, it had spent 27 weeks on the French Top 200. It was released on Play Two, a French affiliate label for Warner Music. It was certified platinum and enjoyed more than 30 million streams.

== Charts ==
=== Weekly charts ===
Weekly chart performance for "Casanova"
Chart (2020–2021)	Peak position
France (SNEP)	16

=== Year-end charts ===
Year-end chart performance for "Casanova"
Chart (2021)	Position
France (SNEP)	38
