= Jorge Villaverde =

Cuban-American anticommunist activist (1934-2002)

- Born: October 17, 1934; Havana, Cuba
- Died: June 11, 2002 (aged 67); Miami, Florida, United States
- Cause of death: Drive-by shooting
- Citizenship: United States
- Education: Public Law degree
- Alma mater: Colegio de Belen; University of Havana
- Occupations: Lawyer; Activist; Smuggler; Revolutionary; Community Leader
- Relatives: Rafael Villaverde (brother)

Jorge S. Lamadriz Villaverde was a Cuban-born exile living in the United States of America. He was a lifelong Catholic anticommunist and anti-Castro activist (activista anticastra). He escaped the Castro regime and made his way to Miami. While in Miami, he became a staunch and vocal opponent of Fidel Castro, and was connected through his brother Rafael Villaverde to the Bay of Pigs Invasion.

He was later suspected of having been a member of a vast Cuban-American narcotics and drug smuggling ring. In 2002, Villaverde was murdered in a drive-by shooting while taking out the trash.

== Early life in Cuba ==
Villaverde was born and raised in Havana, where he attended the Colegio de Belén. He later attended the University of Havana, and earned a public law degree. His first job out of university as a lawyer was with the law firm of Barroso, Valdes-Fauli and Sanabria. He later worked at the law firm of Gaston Godoy.

When Fidel Castro, Raúl Castro, Che Guevara, and others successfully led the Cuban Revolution, Villaverde became an early leader in the Christian Democratic Party of Cuba. In 1960, the Castro regime imprisoned Villaverde at La Cabaña and sentenced him to death by firing squad. However, due to an appeal by the Vatican, his sentence was commuted to 30 years in prison. He was imprisoned alongside Roberto Martín Pérez and other Cuban political dissidents.

== Escape from Cuba and exile in Miami ==
After 18 years as a political prisoner, Villaverde escaped by swimming across Guantanamo Bay to the U.S. Naval Base there. He was captured by a US Naval patrol in the Bay and detained before claiming asylum in the United States.

After being relocated to Little Havana in Miami, Villaverde's vocal opposition to the Castro regime grew. He was labeled by the Cuban government as an "enemy of the Revolution," and was given persona-non-grata status by their foreign embassy. As an anticastra, he travelled to Geneva during several meetings of the Human Rights Commission to protest against Cuba and denounce their violations of human rights.

Villaverde's brother, Rafael Villaverde, was considered even more extreme than Jorge: Rafael joined the United States Army and the Central Intelligence Agency, and with Brigade 2506, took part in the Bay of Pigs Invasion. Rafael has been called "the weather vane of anti-Castro activities." Jorge was also involved in CIA activities around this time, but did not participate in the invasion.

Rafael and Jorge founded the Little Havana Activities and Nutrition Center, which at that time was both a charity organization that did valuable work in improving the lives of Cuban Americans, and the focal point for Cuban anticommunist terrorist groups in the 70's and 80's.

== The Gris Brothers ==
Jorge Villaverde and his two brothers were accused by a federal narcotics strike force sting operation called Operation Tick Talk of having been a member of a vast Cuban-American drug smuggling ring. 43 members were captured and arrested after officers from the Miami Police Department and federal agents from the Strike Force planted listening devices in the houses of the Tick Talk targets. It was further discovered that the Villaverde Brothers were using the name of the "Gris Brothers" to smuggle drugs. Rafael Villaverde was lost at sea in 1982, and presumed dead, before the trial could commence.

A judge later threw out the case because the listening devices were planted illegally.

The Gris Brothers were later noted as being involved in CIA sanctioned assassinations, the Iran–Contra affair, and the La Penca bombing.

In 1995, Villaverde spent two years in prison after police discovered unlicensed weapons on his property.

== Murder ==
On the morning of the June 11, 2002, Villaverde walked through the electronic gate of his ranch house, La Tranquilidad, to take out the trash. A white vehicle with two occupants drove by, and one of the occupants leaned over and shot Villaverde.

Villaverde's murder was similar to the murder of a man who lived down the street only a few months prior. Andrés Nazario Sargén, leader of Alpha 66, suspected that Villaverde was assassinated by the Castro regime. Villaverde was also being looked at as a suspect in a double murder at the time of his death.
