= Rafael Villaverde =

Cuban CIA agent, drug smuggler & gun runner (1942-1982)

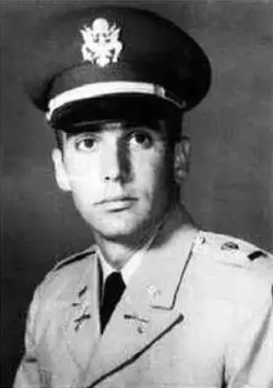
- Born: March 8, 1942; Cuba
- Died: March 31, 1982 (aged 40); Gulf of Mexico
- Relatives: Jorge Villaverde (brother)
- Military career
- Nickname: Ricardo/George Gris
- Allegiance: United States; Brigade 2506
- Branch: United States Army; Central Intelligence Agency
- Conflicts: Cold War; Bay of Pigs Invasion
- Other work: Drug smuggling and gun running

Notes
- Death date is presumed. His body was never recovered and many suspect that he used the explosion to avoid appearing in federal court.

Rafael Villaverde (March 8, 1942 - March 31, 1982) was a Cuban-born exile living in the United States and a veteran of the Bay of Pigs (Playa Giron). He was a soldier and spy, who worked for the United States Army and the Central Intelligence Agency. Villaverde was a staunch anticommunist, a vocal opponent of the Castro regime, and anti-Castro activist (activista anticastra). Villaverde had been deployed to Laos, Vietnam, Cambodia, and elsewhere.

Villaverde was a member of Brigade 2506, which was a brigade of Cuban exiles who took part in the invasion of Cuba during the Bay of Pigs. Villaverde's unit was captured, and he was held in detention by the Castro regime. After Villaverde was released from Cuban prison, his vocal opposition to Castro increased, and he became a well known figure in the Cuban community in Miami.

After the failed invasion, the CIA settled Villaverde into a job with the United Fund, where he learned the operating methods of social services and charities.

In 1972, Villaverde and his brothers opened the first cafe for the elderly on Calle Ocho. Villaverde's main two donors for this cafe were Claude Pepper and Maurice Ferré. It was around this time that he recruited Josefina Carbonell to help him run the cafe. This cafe eventually transformed into the Little Havana Activities and Nutrition Center in Little Havana, Miami, which was both a charity, and an alleged extremist anti-Castro terrorist group front.

Later in life, Villaverde and his two brothers were accused by a federal narcotics strike force sting operation called Operation Tick Talk of having been a member of a vast Cuban-American drug smuggling ring. 43 members were captured and arrested after officers from the Miami Police Department and federal agents from the Strike Force planted listening devices in the houses of the Tick Talk targets. It was further discovered that the Villaverde Brothers were using the name of the "Gris Brothers" to smuggle drugs.

He was also accused of having interactions with Edwin P. Wilson, a former CIA officer who smuggled arms to Muammar Gaddafi and the Libyan government. It was further alleged that he had been recruited by former officers of the CIA to assassinate Gaddafi. Shortly after he had agreed to testify against Wilson, his fishing boat mysteriously exploded in the Gulf of Mexico with him still on board. His body was never recovered.

Others connected with Edwin Wilson later died in suspicious circumstances, including Waldo H. Dubberstein and Kevin Mulcahy. Dubberstein was found after failing to appear in court; he'd died of an apparent suicide. Mulcahy was found to have died from natural causes. However, some federal investigators in both cases suspected they might have been murdered.

Villaverde was cleared posthumously when the judge in the trial of Operation Tick Talk threw out the case on the grounds that the listening devices were placed illegally.

In 2002, Villaverde's brother Jorge Villaverde was murdered in a drive-by shooting while he was taking out the trash.

== Possible survival ==
If Rafael did not die at sea, it is possible that he was later involved in the Iran–Contra affair, as the "Gris Brothers," were identified in a federal court as men involved in the affair. One plaintiff in the court trial specifically identified Rafael Villaverde as being involved in CIA activities in South America and the Caribbean some time after his boat exploded in the Gulf. Rafael was further noted by this source as having been deployed to both Iran and Libya.
