= Casanova (restaurant) =

Restaurant in Carmel-by-the-Sea, California

Coordinates: 36°33′24.65″N 121°55′16.76″W

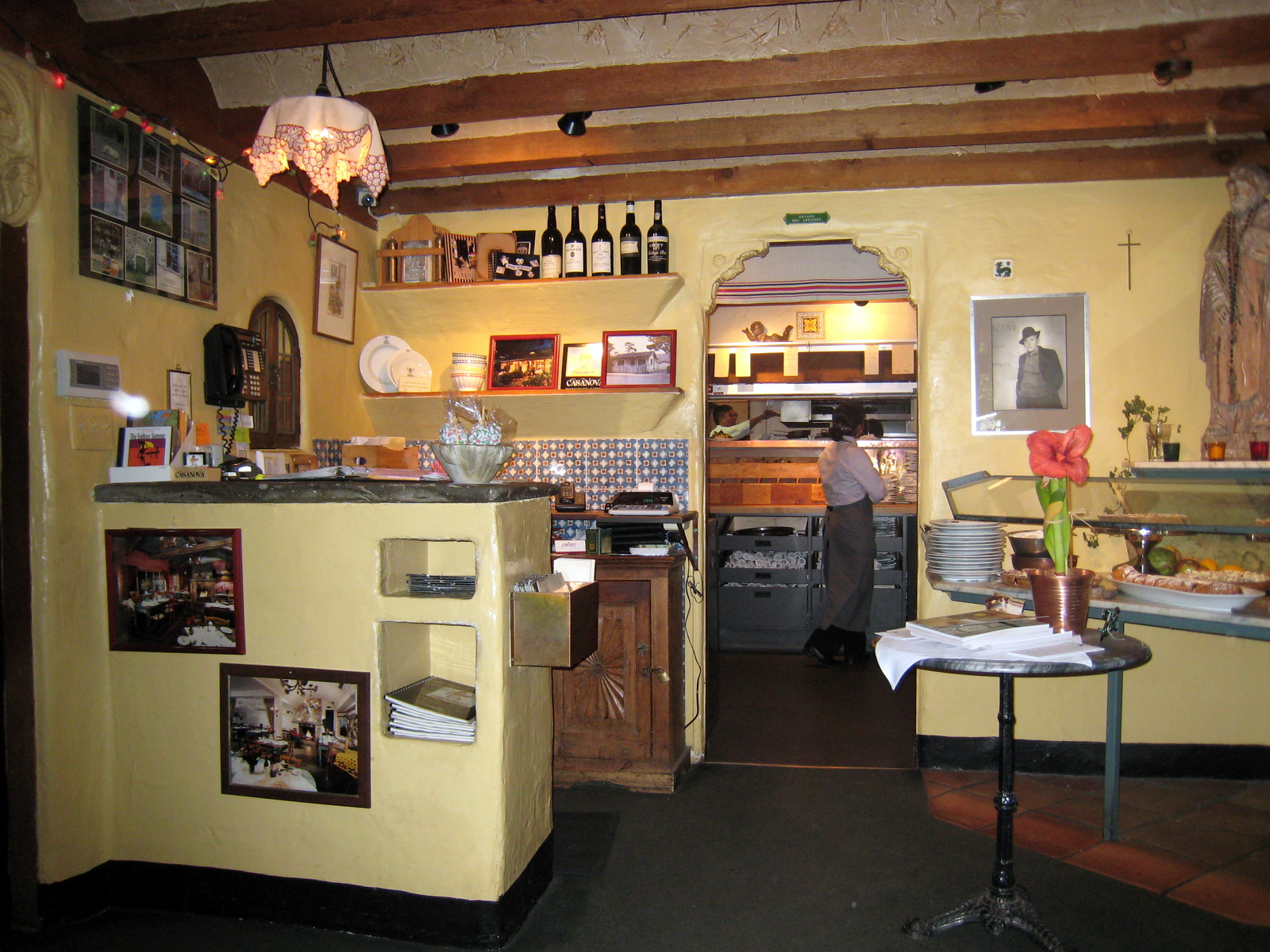
- Interior of Casanova
- Interactive map of Casanova

Restaurant information
- Owner: Walter Georis
- Chef: David Baron
- Food type: French; Italian
- Dress code: Casual
- Location: 5th Ave Between Mission and San Carlos, Carmel-by-the-Sea, Monterey, California, United States
- Reservations: Yes
- Website: casanovarestaurant.com

Casanova is a restaurant in Carmel-by-the-Sea, California in the United States.

== History ==
Casanova is located in a former house. They serve French and Italian food. The restaurant was co-owned by Walter Georis and his brother, Gaston Georis. In 2015, Walter took full ownership of the restaurant. The wine director is Jeff Birkemeier and the executive chef is David Baron. The restaurant is dog friendly and allows dog owners to order whatever they want off the menu to feed their dogs.

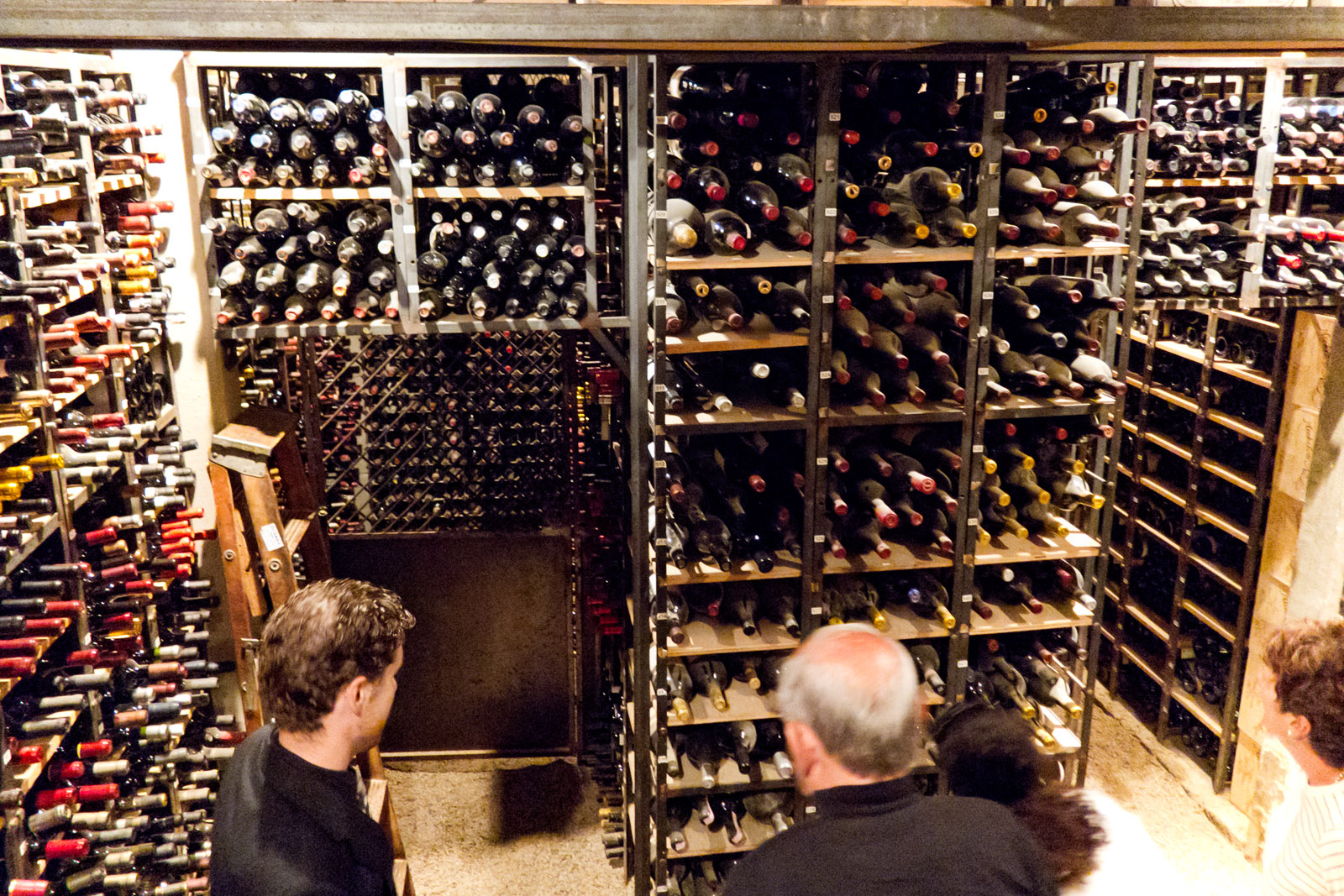
Wine cellar at Casanova

The wine list has 2,000 wines available and up to 16,000 in the wine cellar. In 2015, Casanova's wine list was named a finalist in the James Beard Awards.

=== Van Gogh table ===
While visiting France with his family, Walter became friends with the family that own Auberge Ravoux. The family spent hours at the restaurant and upon their return to Carmel, found the table that they spent time, and Van Gogh used to eat at, waiting for them at Casanova as a gift. The table was made a permanent fixture at the restaurant. It is available for special occasions and meals. In April 2015, Casanova celebrated Vincent van Gogh's birthday by creating a series of art inspired prix fixe meals paired with wines.
