= Alberto Villaverde Cabral =

Portuguese journalist and politician (1942–1996)

- Born: 21 June 1942; Ponta Delgada, Azores, Portugal
- Died: 19 August 1996 (aged 54); Portugal
- Citizenship: Portuguese
- Occupations: Journalist; Politician
- Known for: Director of Information at RTP
- Political party: Portuguese Communist Party
- Children: Teresa, Manuel, and Joana Villaverde

Alberto Villaverde Cabral (21 June 1942 – 19 August 1996) was a Portuguese journalist and politician who served as the director of Information at RTP in the mid-1970s.

== Early life and education ==
Alberto Villaverde Cabral was born on 21 June 1942, in the Azores municipality of Ponta Delgada, as the son of Teresa Villaverde Rovirosa (1920–?), a native of Tarragona, and António Joaquim de Andrade Cabral (1908–), an agricultural engineer from Lisbon, who had to live in Ponta Delgada between 1940 and 1942 due to professional reasons. His father was a cultured man and a very competent technician, while his mother was a very open-minded Spanish lady, thanks to whom he learned Castilian, thus becoming bilingual.

Villaverde was raised at Avenida Carlos Silva in Santo Amaro de Oeiras, where he completed his primary and secondary studies.

== Political career ==
Villaverde began his political activity at the age of 16, when he was still a student at the Oeiras high school, by joining his older brother Manuel in the campaign for the 1958 presidential elections, first in favor of Arlindo Vicente and, after his withdrawal, in support of Humberto Delgado. It was around this time that he had his first interaction with the Portuguese Communist Party. Like so many other students, he was involved in the Academic Crisis of 1962, participating in the student movement in the high schools.

On 5 October 1963, Villaverde married Marília Pereira Morais, already having two children by the time he was arrested by the PIDE in 1967, spending around two months in Caxias. In total, he had three children: Teresa, Manuel, and Joana Villaverde. Between 1969 and 1974, he actively participated in the Portuguese Democratic Movement (CDE), even becoming a member of its Executive Committee, while his wife Marília was one of the founders of the Democratic Women's Movement, even becoming a union leader of the Union of Portuguese Anti-Fascist Resistants.

== Professional career ==
Shortly after being released from prison in 1967, Villaverde was employed at the American news agency Associated Press, where he served as the head of the international section. In the following year, in 1968, he joined the newspaper Diário de Lisboa, where he quickly became one of its most active members, writing several articles and chronicles, almost all of which were relentlessly cut down by the fascist censorship. For instance, in December 1971, he and José Garibaldi Barros Queirós wrote Chile a Etapa Necessária ("Chile the Necessary Step"), which was published by Estampa before being immediately seized by the PIDE. In March 1973, he wrote Comentários ao Dia-a-Dia Internacional, published in Prelo Editora, in which he addressed the victories of the Vietnamese people, and got into the civilian targets in the Vietnam War.

In 1973, Villaverde participated in the 3rd Congress of the Democratic Opposition with the thesis Portugal e a NATO, in which he criticized Portugal's presence in NATO, and addressed the regime's position on the international stage. Before the Carnation Revolution, he was part of committees that fought for freedom of expression and promoted the journalists' union movement. Right after the Revolution, he became the Director of Information at RTP, and later chaired the board of directors of the Portuguese News Agency (ANOP), a position that he held from its foundation until November 1975, when he was dismissed. Following the Coup of 25 November 1975, he was one of the co-founders of the newspaper O Diário, becoming the editor of its international section.

Throughout his life, Villaverde contributed to several newspapers and magazines, such as Notícias da Amadora, A Bola, Militante, Avante, O Diabo, TSF, O Tempo e o Modo, and most notably Seara Nova, always writing about international political issues, of which he often commentated on several television debates on international issues. For instance, in November 1987, he was interviewed by journalist Mário Crespo about the agreement between the USA and the Soviet Union regarding the elimination of intermediate-range missiles.

== Death and legacy ==
Villaverde died in Lisbon on 19 August 1996, at the age of 54, the victim of an illness.

A street in the parish of São Francisco Xavier, in Restelo, Lisbon, was named after him.
