= Emilia Casanova de Villaverde =

Cuban political activist

Emilia Casanova de Villaverde (1832–1897) was a Cuban political activist, most notable for her involvement in the Cuban independence movement. She founded La Liga de las Hijas de Cuba, one of the first all-women's organizations dedicated to the Antillean emancipation struggle.

== Early life and career ==
Emilia Casanova de Villaverde was born into an elite Creole slaveholding family in Cuba in 1832. Despite her affluent Creole upbringing, de Villaverde did not share her father's conservative views. At a banquet during her youth, with Spanish authorities in attendance, she defiantly made a toast to Cuban freedom from Spanish colonial power.

By 1825, most of Spain's colonies in the Americas gained independence except for Cuba and Puerto Rico, which remained under Spanish rule. Cuban elites believed that Spanish colonialism would help maintain Cuba's domination of the sugar industry and prevent a slave uprising similar to the Haitian Revolution in 1791. Over the years, many inhabitants of Cuba and Puerto Rico grew dissatisfied with Spanish control, intensifying with the Ten Years' War (1868–1878), the first major rebellion challenging Spanish authority.

Emilia Casanova de Villaverde first traveled to the United States in 1852, along with her father and two brothers. This trip gave her exposure to the Cuban exile community in New York and further sparked her interest in the Cuban independence movement. Although de Villaverde considered remaining in New York City to continue her education, she returned to Cuba after only three months to care for her mother back at home. On her return journey, she agreed to transport revolutionary documents on behalf of the exile community and distributed them in Cuba.

At the age of twenty-two, the Casanova family moved to Philadelphia, where Emilia met and soon after married Cirilo Villaverde. Cirilo Villaverde was a Cuban poet and novelist, most notable for writing the novel Cecilia Valdes. This novel exposed the complex nature of race and class relations embedded in Cuban society. Cirilo had been a politically active member of the Cuban exile community since his arrival in the United States in the 1840s. Like many separatists during the 1840s and 1850s, he initially believed that annexation to the United States was the only way Cuba could eventually abolish slavery. As his viewpoints evolved over time; however, Cirilo eventually favored true Cuban liberation. After marrying the couple moved to New York City, where they became actively involved in the Cuban exile community's independence movement.

== Early political activity ==
As Emilia Casanova de Villaverde built up a social network within the Cuban exile community in New York, she started organizing public meetings, writing articles dedicated to the independence cause, and hosting gatherings at her home for supporters of the Cuban revolution. However, women were generally denied membership into political clubs during this time. In response to this barrier, Emilia created all-women's clubs to increase her prominence and decision-making power among exile nationalists. Prior to founding the influential revolutionary women's club, Las Hijas de Cuba, she formed another women's organization known as Las Patriotas de Cuba.

== Las Hijas de Cuba ==
Founded on February 6, 1869, at the St. Julien Hotel near Washington Square in New York City, Las Hijas de Cuba was created by de Villaverde as a political organization for women fighting for Cuban independence. During this time, membership in revolutionary and cultural clubs was restricted to males only, forcing women to form their own organizations. Fourteen Cuban and Puerto Rican women gathered at this initial meeting to discuss helping Cuban soldiers and to criticize the all-male independence organization, Junta Revolucionaria de Cuba y Puerto Rico. As president of Las Hijas de Cuba, Emilia Casanova de Villaverde condemned this all-male club for their "annexationist maneuvers and betrayal of the independence movement." The members of Las Hijas de Cuba, aware of the United States' growing interest in controlling Caribbean nations, disapproved of the fact that the Junta considered the United States an ally. They feared that this would move Cuba closer to annexation by the United States rather than emancipation. The collective power of these women's efforts gained attention and garnered further support for Villaverde. The leaders of Junta Revolucionaria de Cuba y Puerto Rico formed a new club called La Liga shortly after, which came to be dominated by annexationists.

Villaverde used her platform as president of Las Hijas de Cuba to become a more recognizable force within the independence movement. The organization played an important role in raising funds for Cuban soldiers during the Ten Years' War. Additionally, as a representative of Las Hijas de Cuba, Emilia Casanova de Villaverde presented the merits of Cuban liberation before the U.S. Congress on numerous occasions. She was the first Cuban woman granted the right to address the United States Congress on this issue. When her father was imprisoned in Havana during the Ten Years' War, Villaverde spoke with U.S. government officials, including President Ulysses S. Grant, asking for protection. Spain accused many members of the property-owning Creole class of "infidelity" during this contentious time, loosely defined as any actions disrupting the political order, and confiscated their property as punishment. President Grant agreed to protect her father from the Spanish government and soon after Villaverde's father was released. In 1871 and 1872, she again petitioned the United States Congress to support Cuban independence rather than Spanish colonial power. In 1871, Emilia Casanova de Villaverde pleaded the U.S. government for assistance after learning that eight medical school students at the University of Havana were being held hostage by Spanish authorities. In 1872, she informed Washington officials of Spain's hostile behavior on the island of Cuba and presented an extensive argument detailing the economic advantages of aiding Cuba over Spain. Despite de Villaverde's efforts, the U.S. government decided it would be most strategic to side with a weak colonial power rather than a sovereign Cuba.

In order to increase the international visibility of the Cuban emancipation struggle, she wrote to prominent European figures such as Giuseppe Garibaldi and Victor Hugo. In an 1869 letter to Giuseppe Garibaldi, Villaverde stated her abolitionist views: "the beginning of our revolution means the freedom of our slaves, giving them arms and incorporating them in our patriotic ranks." Garibaldi responded to her appeal by stating that he supported Cuba's quest for freedom from colonial oppression, but he did not make any specific commitments to aid the movement.

== Later years ==
Emilia Casanova de Villaverde remained staunchly involved in the fight for Cuban liberation until her death on March 4, 1897. When her husband Cirilo Villaverde died in 1894, she briefly traveled to Cuba for his burial, but decided to return to New York City to continue working for Cuban independence for the remainder of her life. Her death in 1897 occurred just a year before the Spanish–American War in 1898, which resulted in Cuba's independence. Just a few years earlier, in 1895, the Cubans went to war inspired by writers and thinkers such a Jose Marti, considered the father of the country. The Cuban "Mambises" as the revolutionaries were known, led by Generals Antonio Maco, Calixto Garcia and the Dominican Maximo Gomez had driven the Spaniards to a stalemate when the explosion of the USS Maine occurred. Because of this incident, the United States declared war on Spain and sent troops to Cuba, which resulted in the Spaniards defeat and their transferring Cuba, Puerto Rico and the Philippines to U.S. control. After five years of U.S. rule and the Cuban revolutionaries making it clear that they would fight the Americans if they stayed as conquerors, the U.S. allowed Cuban independence and self-rule, but managed to insert a clause in the Cuban Constitution called the Platt Amendment, which permitted the U.S. to intervene in Cuba whenever the U.S. decided the Cuban government was not stable. After several such interventions in the early 20th century, the Platt amendment was revoked in the 1930s by mutual agreement.
