= Kevin Patrick Mulcahy =

American intelligence officer

Kevin Mulcahy
- Born: August 27, 1942; Brockton, Massachusetts
- Died: October 25, 1982 (aged 40) Virginia
- Buried: Calvary Cemetery, Brockton, Massachusetts
- Branch: United States Navy; Central Intelligence Agency
- Conflicts: Cold War

Kevin Mulcahy (August 27, 1942 - October 25, 1982) was an American intelligence officer and member of the Central Intelligence Agency who was the first whistleblower against Edwin P. Wilson and Frank Terpil. Shortly before he was scheduled to testify against Wilson and Terpil, he died of possible pneumonia in a cabin in the Shenandoah woods after refusing federal witness protection.

Former Green Beret Luke Thompson told the press: "Immediately I knew that he was killed to keep from testifying before the trial that's coming up in Houston."

Mulcahy's autopsy was inconclusive, and failed to reveal the cause of his death.

The last doctor to treat Mulcahy did not believe that he died of natural causes.

Mulcahy became obsessed with the case of Wilson and Terpil to the point where he began investigating the case himself against the wishes of federal prosecutors - which alleged that they were selling arms and munitions to the government of Libya and Muammar Gaddafi, as well as the Irish Republican Army and other terror organizations.

Mulcahy's father, Donald V. Mulcahy, and four of his siblings were all members of the CIA.

Mulcahy was the second witness against Wilson and Terpil to die, with Rafael Villaverde mysteriously disappearing in the Gulf of Mexico not long before Mulcahy's death.
