= Fernando Casanova (footballer) =

Dominican Republic footballer

Personal information
- Full name: Fernando Casanova Aizpún
- Date of birth: 30 October 1988 (age 37)
- Place of birth: Santo Domingo
- Position: Midfielder

Team information
- Current team: Bauger FC

Youth career
- 2009: Ithaca College

Senior career*
Years	Team	Apps	(Gls)
2010–	Bauger FC		(5)

International career^{‡}
2011–	Dominican Republic	6	(1)
- * Club domestic league appearances and goals as of 16 September 2011 ‡ National team caps and goals as of 16 September 2011

Fernando Casanova Aizpún (born 30 October 1988) in Santo Domingo is a Dominican international footballer who plays as a midfielder for Bauger FC in the Dominican Republic First Division.

== Career ==
Casanova played college soccer at Ithaca College.

He made his international debut for the Dominican Republic in 2011 and has participated in FIFA World Cup qualifying matches.
