= Rudolf Lechler =

Rudolf Christian Friedrich Lechler
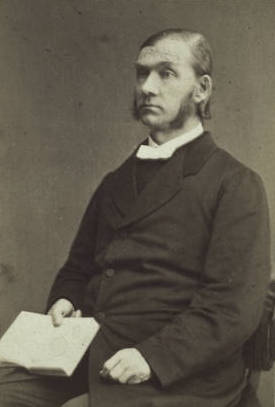
- Missionary to China
- Born: 26 July 1824; Hundersingen, Hohenzollern-Sigmaringen, Germany
- Died: 29 March 1908 (aged 83); Germany
- Education: Home Education
- Title: Evangelist, Mission Administrator
- Spouse: Auguste Nordstadt
- Parent: Gottlob Lechler

Rudolf Christian Friedrich Lechler (Chinese: 黎力基) (26 July 1824 – 29 March 1908), was a German evangelical Christian missionary to China, and is one of early leaders of the Basel Mission evangelizing to the Hakka people. Lechler spent 52 years in China. The Basel Hakka Mission that he administered was responsible for establishing over 51 mission stations, 56 schools with over two thousand members. Lechler is known today for administering to the early Hakka Christian church and, together with his mission coworkers, facilitated in the resettling of Hakka Christian communities fleeing from persecution to Southeast Asian countries of which new congregations such as the Basel Christian Church of Malaysia and the Lutheran Church in Malaysia and Singapore were subsequently formed. Lechler appreciated China's cultural heritage and was able to preach in several varieties of Chinese, including Mandarin, Hokkien, and Hakka, the last of which he knew well enough to help prepare a Romanized Hakka edition of the Gospel of Matthew and Gospel of Luke. Today the Hakka Christian community is estimated to have 150,000 members worldwide.

== Youth and early work ==
Lechler was born on 26 July 1824 to pastor and Pietist Gottlob Lechler. He initially joined the merchant industry as an apprentice. During this time, an illness in which he contracted resulted in his Christian faith being strengthened and in 1844 committed himself to becoming a missionary by entering a Mission school run by the Basel Mission. It was during this time that he became acquainted with Theodore Hamberg During this time, the missionary Karl Gützlaff began touring churches in Western Europe and calling for missionary work to begin on the inland areas of China where no Westerner had ventured before. The Rhenish Missionary Society and the Basel Mission heeded the call and arranged for Theodor and Lechler to set sail for China, arriving on March 19, 1847.

== First Expedition to China ==
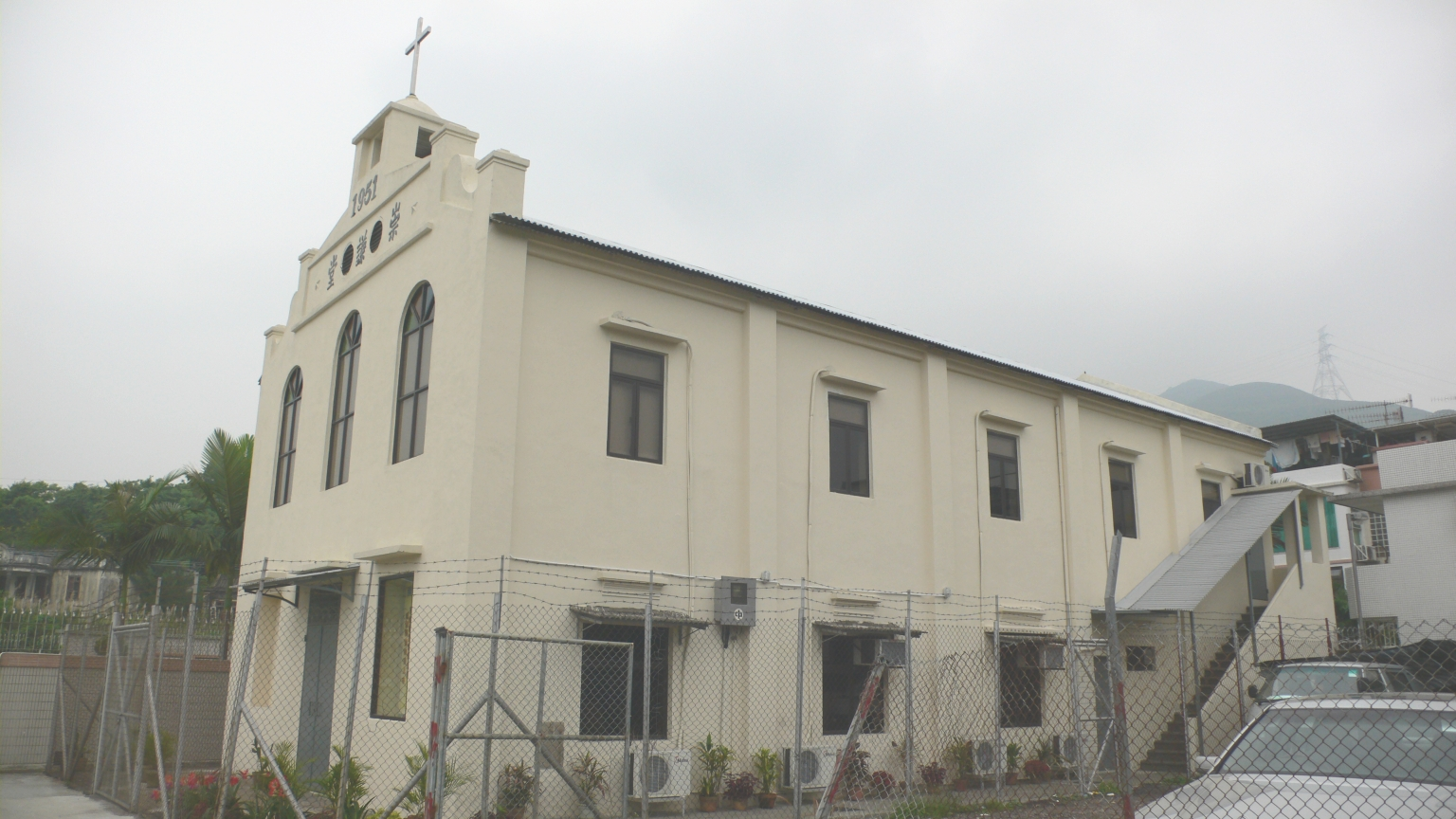
The Tsung Kyam Chapel in 2006 after a revamp

In 1838, the Basel Missionary residing in India, C. Krückeberg travelled to Macau to recuperate from an illness and during this time he met Karl Gutzlaff and began to take an interest in the mission work taking place in China. He recommended that the Basel Mission society also begin sending its workers to China. On the May 13, 1846, the Basel Mission commissioned pastors Theodore Hamberg and Rudolph Lechler to China. In the same year, the Barmen Mission resolved to send Heinrich Köster and Ferdinand Genähr to assist Gutzlaff. The four of them reached Hong Kong on March 19. The Berlin Missionary Society also sent pastors Newman and Schubert as missionaries to China. In the early year, the three mission societies had their own separate mission goals - Gutzlaff arranged for the Basel Church to be responsible for evangelizing the eastern Guangdong region, Lechler was to administer to the Teochew people in the Chaozhou and Shantou areas, whereas Hamberg was minister to the Hakka population. The Barmen Mission workers were to be assigned the southeastern and western parts of the province where the language of the local population is predominantly Cantonese. The Berlin Mission Society was allotted the Guangzhou area north of the Beijiang River to preach to both the local Hakka and Cantonese residents. This strategy continued until after the Boxer Incident when all three mission societies began to cooperate and jointly develop common goals amongst themselves.

== See also ==
- Theodore Hamberg
- Tsung Tsin Mission of Hong Kong
