= Council of Churches of Malaysia =

Christian society in Malaysia

- Majlis Gereja-gereja Malaysia
- Formation: January 9, 1948; 78 years ago
- Headquarters: No. 26 Jalan Universiti, 46200 Petaling Jaya, Selangor, Malaysia.
- Coordinates: 3°6′45.95″N 101°39′4.7″E
- Region served: Malaysia
- President: Philip Thomas
- Website: ccmalaysia.org
- Formerly called: Malayan Christian Council (1947-1966); Council of Churches of Malaysia and Singapore (1967-1975)

The Council of Churches of Malaysia (CCM) is an ecumenical fellowship of Churches and Christian organisations in Malaysia. It is one of the three constituent members of the Christian Federation of Malaysia.

It is affiliated with the Commission on World Mission and Evangelism of the World Council of Churches and a member of the Christian Conference of Asia. It also participates in the Malaysian Consultative Council of Buddhism, Christianity, Hinduism, Sikhism and Taoism as part of the Christian Federation of Malaysia.

== History ==
In 1947, the Malayan Christian Council was mooted and officially inaugurated on 9 January 1948 under the leadership of John Leonard Wilson, the Anglican Bishop of Singapore, with Hobart Baumann Amstutz of the Methodist Church acting as General Secretary to promote Christian unity among the Churches and Christian organisations in Malaya and Singapore.

Despite the 1963 federation of the British Crown Colonies of Singapore, North Borneo, and Sarawak with the Federation of Malaya into the new nation of Malaysia, the Malayan Christian Council continued to function using the old name. In 1967, the Malayan Christian Council was renamed the Council of Churches of Malaysia and Singapore. In view of Malaysia and Singapore having separated and become independent sovereign nations, it was considered desirable to have separate Councils of Churches for each nation, therefore, the Council was divided into 2 national organisations; the current Council of Churches of Malaysia and the National Council of Churches of Singapore in 1975.

== Basis and objectives ==
=== Basis ===
The Council is founded

- on a common belief that God has revealed His eternal purpose for mankind in His Son Jesus Christ, through the Holy Spirit. Its members accept the scriptures of Old and New Testaments as the supreme standard of faith and practice, and confess their common faith as expressed in the Apostles' and Nicene Creeds
- on the acceptance of the principal that the Church is in the Christian enterprise that the local congregation is basic to its life and witness, and that evangelism is its primary task
- as an association of Churches, and other Christian organisations, each believing that it is Christ's will that His Body, the Church should again be visibly one and each desiring to work towards this end
- as an association of co-operating members, each of which determines its own policy and action

=== Objectives ===
The objectives of the Council are

- to offer itself as an instrument or agency to the Churches in Malaysia whereby they can more and more do together everything except what irreconcilable differences of sincere conviction compel them to do separately
- to show forth among its members that Christian unity which is God's gift to His people in Jesus Christ, and by common prayer, study, consultation and action, promote the Church's mission in Malaysia and the World
- through common consultation and action to form Christian public opinion and bring it to bear on the moral, social, national and international problems of the day, particularly those affecting the life and welfare of the peoples of Malaysia
- to promote discussion and action among Churches in Malaysia towards Church union
- to provide an agency through which governments in Malaysia both federal and state, may consult with member-churches and organisations on matters of common concern to all member bodies of the Council
- to maintain fellowship with other Christian Councils or Council of Churches of other countries and with such ecumenical bodies as the Council may decide, and in particular to fulfil its obligations as an affiliated member of the World Council of Churches and the Christian Conference of Asia

== Constituents ==
=== Member Churches ===
Member Church	Head of Church
Anglican Diocese of Kuching	Bishop: Rt Rev Danald Jute
Anglican Diocese of Sabah	Bishop: Rt Rev Melter Jiki Bin Tais
Anglican Diocese of West Malaysia	Bishop: Rt Rev Dr D Steven Abbarow
Basel Christian Church of Malaysia	Bishop Rev Dr James Wong Chong Leong
Evangelical Lutheran Church in Malaysia	Bishop Steven Lawrence
Lutheran Church in Malaysia and Singapore	Bishop Thomas Low Kok Chan
Mar Thoma Syrian Church in Malaysia	Dr Thomas Philips
Methodist Church in Malaysia: Chinese Annual Conference; Sabah Provisional Annual Conference; Sarawak Chinese Annual Conference; Sarawak Iban Annual Conference; Tamil Annual Conference; Trinity Annual Conference	Bishop: Rev Dr T Jeyakumar: Rev Dr Wong Tik Wah; Ling Heu Uh; Rev Dr Lau Hui Ming; Rev Bonnie Sedau; Rev Dr Dennis Raj; Rev Joshua Khong
Orthodox Syrian Church in Malaysia	Cor Episcopa Philip Thomas
Presbyterian Church in Malaysia	Rev Chua Hua Peng
Protestant Church in Sabah	Bishop Rev. Justin Sansalu
Salvation Army in Malaysia	Lt Colonel David Bringans: Major Lim Teck Fung

=== Associate Members ===
Organisation	Head of Organisation
Bible Society of Malaysia	Ng Moon Hing, President
Boys' Brigade in Malaysia	Nicholas Yeap, Brigade President
Girls' Brigade in Malaysia	Lau Mee Ting, President
Malaysian Christian Association for Relief	Wong Young Soon, Executive Director
National Council of YMCAs	Geh Thing Lok, Executive Director
Young Women's Christian Association of Malaysia	Loius Bong, President
Seminari Theoloji Malaysia	Dr Chong Siaw Fung, Principal
Sabah Theological Seminary	Dr Thu En Yu, Principal
Mobilisation Fellowship Malaysia	Choong Wye Choon, National Director
Interserve Malaysia	Philip Chang, Chairman
Prison Fellowship Malaysia	Dr. Tan Kah Hock, Chairman

=== Affiliate Members ===
Organisation	Head of Organisation
Coptic Orthodox Church in Malaysia	Fr Joseph Sim, Representative

== Leadership ==
=== Presidents ===
Period	Name	Denomination
2003 -	Dr Thomas Philips	Mar Thoma Syrian Church in Malaysia
2001 - 2003	Julius D. Paul	Evangelical Lutheran Church in Malaysia
1995 - 2000	Yong Ping Chung	Anglican Diocese of Sabah
1989 - 1994	Dr Denis C. Dutton	Methodist Church in Malaysia
1987 - 1988	E.B. Muthusami	Evangelical Lutheran Church in Malaysia
1983 - 1986	George Vergis	Mar Thoma Syrian Church in Malaysia
1979 - 1982	John Gurubatham Savarimuthu	Anglican Diocese of West Malaysia
1977 - 1978	E.B. Muthusami	Evangelical Lutheran Church in Malaysia
1975 - 1976	C.N. Fang	Methodist Church in Malaysia
1972 - 1974	Basil Temenggong	Anglican Diocese of Kuching
1970 - 1971	V.E. Thomas	Mar Thoma Syrian Church in Malaysia
1968 - 1969	Roland Koh Peck Chiang	Anglican Diocese of Sabah
1966 - 1967	Robert F. Lundy	Methodist Church in Singapore and Malaysia
1964 - 1965	R.M. Greer	Presbyterian Church
1963	Dr Ho Seng Ong	Methodist Church in Singapore and Malaysia
1962	Roland Koh Peck Chiang	Anglican Diocese of Jesselton (Sabah)
1958 - 1961	J.R. Fleming, Church of Scotland Missionary	Presbyterian Church
1947 - 1957	Leonard Wilson	Anglican Diocese of Singapore

=== General Secretaries ===
Period	Name
1998 -	Dr Hermen Shastri
1995 - 1997	Dr Hermen Shastri (Honorary)
1989 - 1994	Varghese George (Honorary)
1975 - 1988	Dr Denis C. Dutton (Honorary)
1973 - 1974	V.D.P. Pillai
1972	R. Chelladurai
1967 - 1971	Wong Hoon Hee
1958 - 1966	Chung Chi-an
1952 - 1957	J.R. Fleming
1947 - 1951	Hobart B. Amstutz (Honorary)

== See also ==
- Christianity in Malaysia
- Christianity in Singapore
- Ecumenism
