= Chan Tzun Hei =

- 陈俊熙

Sabah Deputy Youth Chief of Parti Gerakan Rakyat Malaysia and National Youth Central Committee
- Incumbent
- Assumed office 2014

Personal details
- Born: 28 November 1983 (age 42) Sandakan, Sabah, Malaysia
- Citizenship: Malaysian
- Party: Parti Gerakan Rakyat Malaysia (2009-present); Sabah Progressive Party (2003-2008)
- Other political affiliations: Barisan Nasional (2004-2018); Perikatan Nasional (2021-)
- Spouse: Janice Tzun Chan Tzun Hei
- Children: 2
- Education: University of Technology, Malaysia; Open University Malaysia
- Occupation: Politician
- Profession: Community Development Leader

Military service
- Allegiance: Malaysia

Chan Tzun Hei (Chinese: 陈俊熙) (born 28 November 1983) is the current Sabah Deputy Youth Chief of Parti Gerakan Rakyat Malaysia (Gerakan), a component party of the ruling Barisan Nasional coalition. He is also the National Youth Central Committee and State of Sabah Liaison Committee Secretary of Parti Gerakan Rakyat Malaysia (Gerakan). He is also the Community Development Leader for the constituency of Elopura, a district in Sandakan, Sabah. He is also the current Youth Chief for Sandakan Branch and Division of for Parti Gerakan Rakyat Malaysia (Gerakan). Chan is able to converse in English, Bahasa Malaysia, Mandarin Chinese and other Chinese dialects such as Hakka and Cantonese.

== Personal background ==
Chan was born on 28 November 1983 at the Duchess of Kent Hospital at Sandakan, Sabah. He is currently married and has one daughter and a son,

== Educational and career background ==
Chan studied in Tai Tong Kindergarten from year 1988–1989. He had his primary school at Sekolah Jenis Kebangsaan (C) Tai Tong from year 1990–1995. He continued his secondary education at Sung Siew Secondary School in Sandakan from year 1996 until 2003. Having completed his SPM (Sijil Pelajaran Malaysia), he went on to continue doing STPM at his secondary school, Sung Siew Secondary School.

Chan pursued a diploma in Engineering Business Management majoring in Business Leadership & Strategic Management from University of Technology, Malaysia in year 2008 and completed it in year 2009. He continued to pursue a Master of Commerce (General Management) from Open University Malaysia from year 2015 and completed in year 2017.

== Political background ==
Chan was a part-time teacher at Sekolah Jenis Kebangsaan (C) Lok Yuk primary school, Sandakan for the year 2004 prior to working as the political secretary for Datuk Au Kam Wah, the state assemblymen for N.45 Elopure since year 2004. He was the youngest to be appointed as Elopura Community Development Leader at the age of 24 by the Sabah Chief Minister, Datuk Seri Panglima Musa Aman. He was tasked to deal with the social, economic and political problem that occurred in the state of Elopura. As a Community Development Leader for N.45 Elopura, he head the department staffed with 12 personnel. He assisted in coordinating special development fund for the district of Elopura based on priority and needs. Furthermore, he has to attend to various municipal council management, development and policy making meeting.

Chan was a member of Sabah Progressive Party (SAPP) since year 2004. In year 2008, as Sabah Progressive Party (SAPP) decided to pull out from Barisan Nasional Sabah, he quit (SAPP) and followed Datuk Au Kam Wah to join Parti Gerakan Rakyat Malaysia, a political party of the Barisan Nasional.

== Rotary Club ==
Chan is very active in the Sandakan community. He was the club president for Rotary Club District 3310, for year 2013–2014. He was appointed as District 3310 Assistant Governor for the year of 2016 to 2017 and District 3310 Alumni Association, Sabah Regional Chairman for year 2016–2017.

== Malaysian Red Crescent Society ==
Chan held various portfolio with the Malaysian Red Crescent Society. Among are officer in charge of Youth for Sandakan Chapter from 2003 to 2007. He was officer in charge of Training of Sandakan Chapter from 2007 to 2009. He was the Blood Donation Chairman from 2009 to 2011. Lastly, he was the Vice Chairman II from year 2011 to 2013.

== Other NGO involvement ==
1. Kelab Sukan Komuniti Elopura – Pengerusi
2. The Alumni Association of The Ship for Southeast Asian Youth Program of Malaysia – SSEAYP International Malaysia (SIM or KABESA) – Member
3. Young Malaysian Movement (YMM) Sandakan – Advisor
4. District Sandakan Anti Drug Abuse Organization - PEMADAM – Life Member, Ex-Officio
5. Sandakan Sze Yip Association – Life Member, Secretary General
6. United Sabah Sze Yip Association – Committee Member
7. Panel Penasihat Klinik Kesihatan Sandakan – Pengerusi
8. Ahli Lembaga Pelawat Sri Harapan Rumah Warga Tua – Ahli Lembaga
9. Yayasan Penjaja & Peniaga Kecil 1 Malaysia – AJK Pemilih mewakili Sabah
10. Chi Hwa School Board – Honorary Treasurer (SJK) & Committee Member (Kindergarten)

== International involvement ==
1. Youth Exchange Program with more than 300 youths from ASEAN and Japan for The 32nd/2005 Ship for Southeast Asia Youth Program – SSEAYP.
2. Liaison Officer for the 33rd/2006 Ship for Southeast Asia Youth Program – SSEAYP during Country Program in Malaysia.
3. Group Study Exchange (GSE) sponsored Rotary Club of Sandakan, District 3310 to District 1470 Denmark for 5 weeks (2008).
4. Political Avenue to Opening Markets and Promoting Entrepreneurship Seminar by Friedrich Naumann Foundation (FNF) at Cologne, Germany (2014).
5. Organised State level, Sabah Invention & design Exhibition (Sindex) in Kota Kinabalu in year 2010.

== Assisting in the Fire incident at Sri Taman and Others ==
Chan was involved as community leader in assisting the victim of the fire incident that occurred at Sri Taman, Mile 3.5 where eight houses was destroyed from the fire incident. Chan also assisted a robbery victim who was attacked at Bandar Utama. Chan raised the concern of the existence of militants in Sandakan. Chan raised the issue of insufficient haemodialysis machines at the Duchess of Kent Hospital of Sandakan. He also assisted a Sandakan local who obtained expired medicine by sending a formal letter to the District Health Officer.

== Election results ==
Sabah State Legislative Assembly
Year	Constituency	Candidate	Votes	Pct	Opponent(s)	Votes	Pct	Ballots cast	Majority	Turnout
2018	N45 Elopura	Chan Tzun Hei (Gerakan)	5,572	31.32%	Calvin Chong Ket Kiun (DAP)	12,219	68.68%	18,047	6,647	71.37%

== Awards and honours ==
- Sabah State Excellent Youth Leadership Award (2008), Bintang Setia Kinabalu (2012)
