= Sabah Theological Seminary =

Interdenominational Protestant seminary in Kota Kinabalu, Sabah, East Malaysia

Coordinates: 30.293161°N 97.732539°W

- Type: Seminary
- Established: 1988
- Principal: Dr. Thu En Yu
- Location: Kota Kinabalu, Sabah, East Malaysia
- Website: http://www.stssabah.org/

Sabah Theological Seminary (STS) is an interdenominational Protestant seminary located in the town of Kota Kinabalu, Sabah, East Malaysia.

== Overview ==
Established in 1988, STS is the first theological seminary in Malaysia to offer theological studies in the Malay language. It is accredited by the Association for Theological Education in South East Asia (ATESEA) and a participating school of the South East Asia Graduate School of Theology (SEAGST).

STS was established as a Christian college to train pastors, church workers and lay Christians. It is located on a 10-acre site on Signal Hill close to Kota Kinabalu city centre. Facilities include an administration and teaching block, a chapel, lecturer’s apartments, student hostels, and a computerized library. A wide range of academic and practical courses are offered in Bahasa Malaysia, Mandarin and English. Each year there are approximately 360-400 students at the seminary.

The seminary is interdenominational and is supported by a broad base of churches both in Malaysia and abroad. Member churches include;

- Anglican Church of Sabah
- Anglican Church of Sarawak
- Basel Christian Church of Malaysia (BCCM)
- Evangelical Lutheran Church in Malaysia (ELCM)
- Grace Chapel Sabah
- Lutheran Church of Malaysia & Singapore (LCMS)
- Protestant Church in Sabah (PCS)
- Sabah Evangelical Mission (SEM)
- Sidang Injil Borneo (SIB)
- Sabah Methodist Church

== Programmes ==
Programmes are offered at Certificate, Diploma, Bachelors, Masters and Doctorate level. Certificate courses are in practical areas such as counselling and mission training, while BA and MA courses are in the area of Divinity and Theology.

== Activities ==
The "Jireh Home" children's home, founded in 2006, grew out of an STS initiative.

In 2021, STS looked at possible structural damage after heavy rains led to landslides in the area. STS received a government grant of RM500,000 to cover a portion of the needed repairs.

== Affiliations ==
- Association for Theological Education in South East Asia
- South East Asia Graduate School of Theology
