= Mar Thoma Syrian Church in Malaysia =

Diocese of Malaysia of the Malankara Mar Thoma Syrian Church
- Classification: Oriental Protestant
- Theology: Reformed
- Polity: Episcopal
- Leader: Theodosius Mar Thoma
- Associations: Council of Churches of Malaysia
- Region: Malaysia
- Origin: 1936
- Congregations: 16
- Members: 2,500

The Mar Thoma Syrian Church in Malaysia is the Malaysian zone of the Diocese of Malaysia, Singapore & Australia in the Malankara Mar Thoma Syrian Church. It currently consists of a total of 16 parishes with 2,500 members nationwide.

The current diocesan bishop is the Rt. Rev. Joseph Mar Barnabas Episcopa.

== History ==
=== Early history ===
The Mar Thoma Church has a unique history in Malaysia being one of the few major denominations and churches not set up by missionaries or ordained priests. Instead it was initiated by a group of Malayali immigrants that were then employed in British Malaya.

Migrants from the Syrian Christian community of Kerala, are reported to have first arrived on the shores of the then Malaya as early as 1910. The Syrian Christian community was always a small community with only 70 Syrian Christians recorded in the census of 1930. Among the earliest was Isaac Benjamin (also known as the "Ninan Inspector") who was followed by K.C. George in 1911. K.C. George laid the foundation of the Mar Thoma Church in Malaya by actively encouraging the movement of Syrian Christians from Kerala to Malaya, in spite of the dangers posed by malaria, rampant this country at that time.

Early Mar Thoma services generally took the form of prayer meetings in private homes. The first service following the Mar Thoma Service Order was held on the first Sundays of every month in the Jubilee School in Klang. This was followed in 1929 by regular services in the Penuel High School in Kuala Lumpur led by K. G. Mathew.

=== The first clergy arrives ===
In 1928, the Very Rev. V.P. Mammen (later Vicar General V. P. Mammen Kasseessa), the General Secretary of the Sunday School Samajam, visited Malaya and upon his return to India strongly recommended to the Sabha Council that a Syrian Christian priest be sent there, to meet the desire of Marthomites to hold formal worship services in Malayalam. In 1932, Mar Thoma members in Klang, Kuala Lumpur, Banting and Kuala Selangor passed a resolution to request a priest from India, who would be resident in Malaya for a few years.

The call was answered when the Rev. T.N. Koshy arrived from India in August 1936. Rev. T.N. Koshy travelled the length and breadth of Malaya and Singapore to minister to the spiritual needs of the Syrian Christian community who were already here and those who were still coming to Malaya. This led to the setting up of one single parish covering the whole of Malaya and Singapore and laid the foundations of another era in the history of the Malankara Mar Thoma Syrian Church marking the establishment of the first Mar Thoma parish outside of India.

=== War and peace ===
While there were those who doubted the viability of creating a parish out of this scattered community, they had not reckoned on the steady growth of the population. While most Syrian Christians still thought of Malaya as a temporary sojourn, there were signs of increasing commitment to this country; one of the most important was the purchase of a piece of land in Kuala Lumpur, on which to construct a church. What was significant was that this purchase was made right at the height of the Japanese Occupation.

With the conclusion of the war, a spurt in migrations of Syrian Christians was seen as further opportunities in the plantation, civil/administrative services and educational sectors opened up. The Rev. V.E. Thomas (later Senior Vicar for Malaysia-Singapore); who was here during the war years; received ordination in 1947 in India and returned to assist to meet the need of the increasing membership. In September/October 1953, the first three church buildings of the Mar Thoma community in Malaya; all named after St. Thomas; (in Kuala Lumpur, Klang and Singapore) were consecrated by the Rt. Rev. Dr. Mathews Mar Athanasius during the first ever Episcopal visit to the fledgling Mar Thoma Church in Malaya and Singapore.

In 1958, the Rev. T.N. Koshy was elevated as the Vicar-General for Malaya in recognition of the valuable services he rendered in encouraging and fostering the growth of the church in Malaya.

=== Elevation as diocese ===
With the independence of Malaya in 1957, the number of parishes grew steadily and in 1962, the Diocese of Malaysia and Singapore was constituted comprising 27 parishes. Although the community suffered from emigration, especially after the May 13 Incident of 1969, activity continued apace indicating the further indigenisation of the Mar Thoma Church in Malaysia.

In 1982, the parishes in Malaysia and Singapore were constituted as the Malaysian Zone and the Singapore Zone of the Diocese of Malaysia and Singapore respectively (now the Diocese of Malaysia, Singapore and Australia).

== Organisation and Symbols ==
=== The Zonal Assembly ===
The church convenes a Zonal Assembly annually as the highest decision making body of the church and it consists of elected representatives of the various parishes and organisations. Zonal assembly members are elected for a 3-year period. The Zonal council consisting of all the vicars, the zonal secretary, the zonal treasurer and three council members function as the decision making and operational arm of the church.

=== Logo of the Mar Thoma Church ===
The logo of the Mar Thoma Church consists of a shield emblazoned with a Christian cross with the representation of the Ashoka Chakra at its centre. It is flanked on the right and left by a lotus and a hand lamp respectively. The motto; Lighted To Lighten; is written in English above the cross.

- The Motto

The role of the church is to spread the good news of the gospel of Jesus Christ. Every believer and member of the Church here in their position, wherever they are, are given the light so that they can lighten others.

- The Cross

The cross placed in the centre represents the centrality of Jesus Christ in the church and its mission. It is a proclamation that God (Purusha) himself came and atoned for all mankind and the redemption is freely available by faith in Jesus Christ without regard to any form of karma.

- The Ashoka Chakra

The Ashoka Chakra is the symbol of India and represents the Indian roots of the church. Traditionally the Chakra as presented by the Emperor Ashoka, was a symbol in denoting the Wheel of Life and Cosmic Order (or Dharmachakra). By placing the wheel at the heart of the Cross, it is a declaration that life finds its ultimate salvation in the atoning sacrifice of Jesus once and for all. It symbolises the completion and closing of the wheel of life for all those who follow the Bhakthi Marga (path of righteousness) in Jesu Maseeh (Jesus Christ).

- The Hand Lamp

The hand lamp represents the lamp that is carried in all believers. It reminds all believers to be the light of the world and act as a witness to give the light of salvation for others in their daily life. It also seeks to remind to pay diligent attention to the study of the word of God.

- The Lotus

The lotus represents holy living and is traditionally part of the offering of sacrifices of praise and adoration in the Indian tradition to God. It reminds believers to live holy despite the circumstances around them and exude the fragrance of God.

== See also ==
- Christianity in Malaysia
- Mar Thoma Church
- Malaysian Malayalees
