= Protestant Church in Sabah =

Lutheran World Federation member church in Malaysia

Protestant Church In Sabah
- Gereja Protestan Sabah; Gorija di Potorontog sid Sabah (Rungus)
- Logo of the PCS
- Classification: Protestant
- Orientation: Lutheran
- Polity: Presbyterian
- Leader: Bishop Christopher Ogodong
- Associations: Lutheran World Federation, Asia Lutheran Communion, Federation of Evangelical Lutheran Churches in Malaysia & Singapore, Council of Churches of Malaysia, Christian Federation of Malaysia, Christian Conference of Asia, World Council of Churches
- Region: Malaysia
- Origin: 1965
- Branched from: Basel Missionary Society
- Congregations: 322
- Members: 42,000 members baptised
- Ministers: 56
- Primary schools: 3
- Official website: pcsmalaysia.org

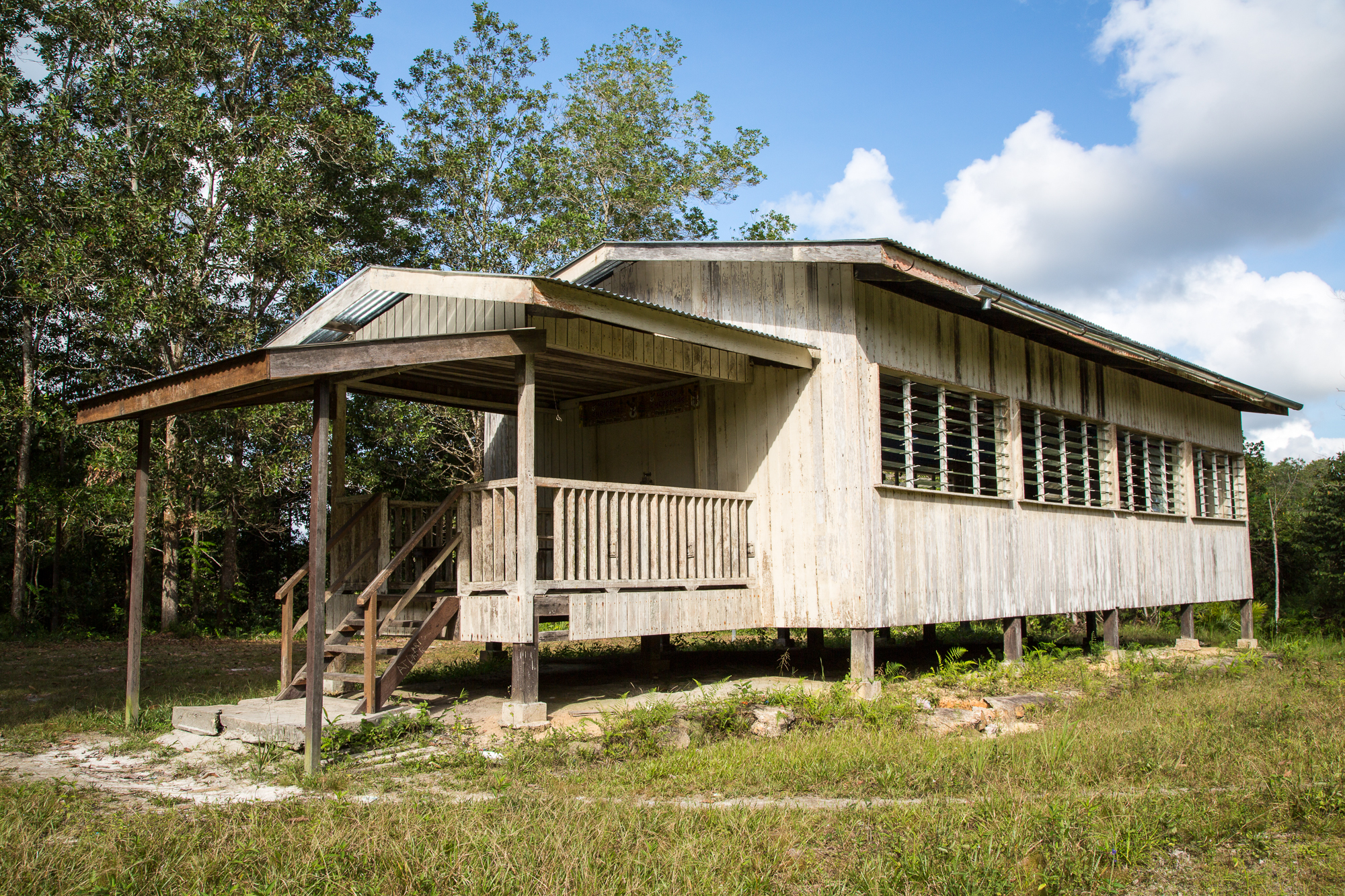
A PCS church in Kg. Sulit, Paitan, Beluran

The Protestant Church in Sabah or PCS (Malay: Gereja Protestan Sabah; Rungus: Gorija di Potorontog sid Sabah) is one of the four Lutheran World Federation member churches in Malaysia. It currently has 322 congregations nationwide in 21 parishes with a total of 32,000 baptised members, making the PCS the second largest of the four Lutheran bodies in the country. Its membership is primarily made up of the indigenous peoples of Sabah, with the largest majority being from the Rungus tribe of the native ethnic Kadazan-Dusun population. The current president cum bishop of the Protestant Church in Sabah is Bishop Christopher Ogodong.

== History ==
The roots of the Protestant Church in Sabah goes back to German missionary work in Kudat in the beginning of the 20th century. The PCS itself was established with the first synod on 20 April 1966 and registered with the Sabah government in 1967 out of the missionary work of the Basel Mission amongst the Rungus, started in December 1952. Already in 1951, the Borneo Basel Self Established Church renamed later Basel Christian Church (BCCM) which had been established much earlier (1924) among the immigrant Chinese community in Sabah sought the help of Hans Bienz, the sixth and last BMS advisor to the BCC, to tour Rungus villages such as Kimihang, Lajong, Handal, Angkob and Rondomon in early 1952. He asked the Basel Mission to send Heinrich Honegger. In December 1952 the mission work amongst Rungus began with the assembly of 45 Rungus headmen, some BCC members and both missionaries Bienz and Honegger. In 1965, the constitution of the PCS was drafted by church elders and missionaries, and the formation of the PCS was officially initiated by a first synod on 20 April 1966 and registered as a legal entity in 1967.

=== Merger attempt with the Basel Christian Church ===
On 23 January 1968, the Basel Missionary Society started advocating a merger of both their Sabah affiliates; the BCC and PCS. A joint mission consultation was held in Kota Kinabalu on 9–13 May 1969 and was also joined by the Lutheran Church in America. However, the merger discussions did not reach an agreement due to concerns that the better organised and financially stable Basel churches may dominate the new body. Further discussions were planned but had to be shelved when crisis hit the Christian community of Sabah as a result of a policy change by the United Sabah National Organisation (USNO) led state government to suspend the renewal of missionary visas as part of the administration's Islamisation campaign.

=== Consolidation ===
By 1973, the departure of foreign missionaries saw the BCC playing a more direct role in providing support for the PCS. Training of local workers was prioritised while contacts were developed between the PCS and other churches in Malaysia. In 1975, the PCS became a member of the World Council of Churches.

=== Expansion beyond Sabah ===
In 1996, congregations were established in West Malaysia, Labuan as well as Singapore to minister to the growing migrant worker population in those territories from Sabah.

== Leadership ==
Since the PCS was organised in 1965, the head of the Executive Council is known as the President. The current president, Bishop Christopher Ogodong is the current and tenth presiding bishop of the PCS.

- 1964-1967

Rev. T.A. Forschner

- 1967-1970

Rev. Otto Dilger

- 1970-1976

Patrick Manjil Madalag

- 1976-1992

Rev. Masandu Majupi

- 1992-2000

Rev. Hendry Ogodong Dangki

- 2000-2008

Rev. Sopirid Masandu

- 2008–2012

Rev. Jimmy Ojlim Assam

- 2012–2020

Rev. Jensey Mojuin

- 2020–2024

Rev. Justin Sansalu

- 2024–present

Rev. Christopher Ogodong

== Schools and colleges ==
=== Theological training ===
In 1956, a Bible school was established in Tinangol near Kudat and continued to operate until 1973 when the USNO led Islamization campaign in the state of Sabah was at its height. The institution was re-opened in 1976 after the fall of the USNO-led administration as the Tinangol Bible Training Centre (Malay: Pusat Latihan Alkitab Tinangol).

=== Vocational training ===
An agricultural school was established in Sikuati. The school was relocated to Tinangol in 1965 and is currently known as the Women's Development Centre (Malay: Pusat Pembangunan Wanita).

=== Academic ===
In 1964, the Basel Mission established three primary schools known as Native Voluntary Schools in the vicinity of Kudat. These were handed over to the PCS when the mission withdrew from Sabah and are currently operating as grant-in-aid schools:

- SRK Lajong
- SRK Tinangol
- SRK Lodung

== Affiliations ==
The PCS participates in ecumenical relationships through:

- Council of Churches of Malaysia

- Christian Federation of Malaysia
- Christian Conference of Asia

- World Council of Churches
- Federation of Evangelical Lutheran Churches in Malaysia & Singapore

- Basel Christian Church of Malaysia
- Lutheran Church in Malaysia
- Evangelical Lutheran Church in Malaysia
- Lutheran Church in Singapore

- Lutheran World Federation

- Asia Lutheran Communion
