= Lutheran Church of China =

Lutheran church in China (1920–1951)

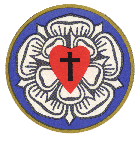
- The seal of Martin Luther. Also used as the logo for the LCC.
- Classification: Protestant
- Orientation: Lutheran
- Founder: Theodore Hamberg, Rudolph Lechler, Heinrich Köster, Ferdinand Genähr
- Origin: 1847
- Defunct: 1951

The Lutheran Church of China (LCC; Chinese: 中華信義會; pinyin: Zhōnghuá Xìnyì Huì; Wade–Giles: Chung^{1}-hua^{2} Hsin^{4}-i^{4}-hui^{4}) was a Lutheran church body in China from 1920 to 1951. It was established as a result of the consultations between the various Lutheran missionary bodies in China that was initiated during the China Centenary Missionary Conference held in Shanghai in 1907. The church survived as an organised body after the Chinese Communist Revolution but was absorbed into the state-backed Three-Self Patriotic Movement.

== History ==
The early Chinese Lutheran churches were the result of the work of western mission societies in the 19th century. Until 1907, no less than 25 European and American Lutheran mission bodies were working in China; most of them independently from each other and some within other organisations such as the China Inland Mission.

=== Early history (1831–1847) ===
Karl Gützlaff (also known by his Chinese name, 郭實臘 or Guō Shílà in Pinyin) is generally regarded as the first Lutheran missionary to China. Originally accredited to the Netherlands Missionary Society, Gützlaff first arrived in East Asia in 1823. As China adopted a strict closed-door policy in that period, he was unable to set foot on China until 1831. Arriving in Tianjin, he was able to distribute some religious pamphlets and gospel tracts.

Although Gützlaff's methods and results were controversial, his major contribution included the promotion of the Chinese mission field to European mission societies, particularly Lutheran bodies.

=== First Lutheran missions (1847–1890) ===
Following Gützlaff's appeal, three German mission societies, the Barmen Mission (later known as the Rhenish Missionary Society or 禮賢會), the Berlin Missionary Society (巴陵信義會), and the Basel Mission (巴色會), sent missionaries to China. On March 19, 1847, Theodore Hamberg (韓山明) and Rudolph Lechler (黎力基) of the Basel Mission, together with Heinrich Köster (柯士德) and Ferdinand Genähr (葉納清) of the Barmen Mission, arrived in Hong Kong and under Gützlaff's guidance began working in different areas of Guangdong province. The Basel missionaries concentrated among the Hakka speaking people in the eastern part of the province whereas the Barmen missionaries worked among the Cantonese speakers of the western part of the province. The churches they founded were called the Chongzhen Church (Tsung-Tsin Church or 崇真會) and Lixian Church (Rhenish Church or 禮賢會) respectively.

The Berlin Missionary Society sent its first missionary to China in 1851 and initially confined its work to the Hakka speaking people in Guangdong province. It eventually extended its work to the Mandarin-speaking people in Jiangxi and Shandong provinces. The church they founded was eventually called the Yuegan Church (越贛會).

=== Other Lutheran missions (1890–1907) ===
Between 1890 and 1907, a number of American and Scandinavian Lutheran mission societies established a presence in China. The notable ones include:

- American Lutheran Mission (1890)

- Mission in the provinces of Henan and Hubei
- Started the Yu'e Lutheran Church (豫鄂信義會)

- Hauge's Synod Mission or 鴻恩會 (1891)

- Mission in Hubei province
- Work later merged in 1917 with the American Lutheran Mission as the United Lutheran Mission (豫鄂信義會)

- Norwegian Lutheran China Mission Association or 中華基督教路德會 (1891)

- Mission in the provinces of Hubei, Henan, and Shaanxi
- Started the Yu'eshaan Lutheran Church (豫鄂陝信義會)

- Danish Lutheran Mission or 路德會(丹) (1896)

- Mission in Manchuria
- Started the Northeastern Lutheran Church (東北信義會)

- Kiel China Mission or 長老教會 (1897)

- Mission in Guangdong province
- Work transferred to the Schleswig-Holstein Evangelical Lutheran Mission (粵南信義會) in 1921
- Church eventually known as the Yuenan Lutheran Church (粵南信義會)

- Finnish Missionary Society or 湘西北信義會 (1901)

- Mission in the provinces of Hunan and Hubei
- Started the Xiang Xibei Lutheran Church (湘西北信義會)

- American Lutheran Brethren Mission or 選道會 (1902)

- Mission in Henan and Hubei border region
- Started the Yu'xi Lutheran Church (豫西信義會)

- Norwegian Missionary Society or 挪威信義會 (1902)

- Mission in Hunan province
- Started the Xiangzhong Lutheran Church (湘中信義會)

- Augustana Synod Mission or 信義會 (1905)

- Mission in the provinces of Henan, Hubei and Jiangxi
- Started the Yu’zhong Lutheran Church (豫中信義會)

=== Towards union (1907–1920) ===
The China Centenary Missionary Conference was held from April 25 to May 8, 1907, in Shanghai in commemoration of the hundredth anniversary of the arrival of Robert Morrison, the first Protestant missionary to China. According to the Index of Missions released during the conference, 25 mission bodies with a Lutheran background were working in China. The Boxer Rebellion of 1900 and other experiences acted as an impetus to encourage the various Lutheran bodies to unite into a single organisation to effectively work in China. The entrance of new Lutheran missions into China after 1907 including the Evangelical Lutheran Mission for China (福音道路德教) in 1913, the Lutheran Free Church Mission (信義公理會) in 1917, and the Church of Sweden Mission (湘北瑞華信義會) in 1918, added an extra sense of urgency to the need for a nationwide Lutheran union.

In May 1907, a Lutheran missionary consultation was held with representatives from ten Lutheran mission bodies. While there was a general agreement that Lutheran unity be achieved, practical concerns such as the linguistic differences of the mission fields, the diverse national backgrounds of the missionaries, and a poor nationwide transportation system were voiced. It was agreed that union should be sought by first adopting the name Xinyi (信義), meaning Faith and Righteousness, to emphasise Luther's doctrine of justification by faith; union would be achieved first in the field of literature and education and that the five mission bodies working in the central Chinese provinces would spearhead the creation of a united Lutheran body. The result of this consultation was the creation of a Union Lutheran Conference (ULC) which was mandated to follow up and implement the proposals of unity that had been discussed.

On August 28–30, 1908, the first ULC meeting was held in Jigongshan or Cockerel Mountain (Wade-Giles: Kikungshan; Traditional Chinese﹕雞公山), Henan, and during this and subsequent conferences, a number of plans were drafted to publish books, compile a hymnal, design worship liturgies, establish schools and establish a national Lutheran Church. To realise these plans, it was decided that priority should be given towards establishing a union Lutheran seminary.

On March 29, 1913, the Lutheran Theological Seminary or 信義神學院 (LTS) was opened in Shekou (Shekow), Hubei. The seminary was sponsored by the American Lutheran Mission, the Hauge's Synod Mission, the Norwegian Missionary Society and the Finnish Missionary Society. Oscar R. Wold of the Hauge Synod Mission was elected the first president and the campus was dedicated on October 19 of the same year. The seminary also served as a publishing house and on September 15, 1913, published The Lutheran Bulletin that served the various Lutheran bodies throughout China.

In 1915, the Temporary Committee of the Lutheran Church of China was formed and took up the task of establishing a single national Lutheran Church. By the second ULC meeting in 1917, all preparations, including a draft constitution had been finalised.

However, in 1915, a Lutheran mission affiliated with the member synods of the Synodical Conference began work and did not participate in the merger. Later, during the communist era, this separate mission ceased organized activity, and its church workers set up operations in Hong Kong instead.

=== The Lutheran Church of China (1920–1951) ===
The united Lutheran Church of China was formally established on August 22, 1920, in Jigongshan, Henan, and the first General Assembly of the LCC was also convened there.

==== First General Assembly (1920) ====
The first assembly convened on August 22–29, 1920, in Jigongshan, Henan, and officially adopted the constitution of the LCC. Five mission bodies took part in the founding of the LCC and the mission churches founded by these bodies became the LCC's first five synods :

- Xiangbei Synod (湘北區會)

- Church of Sweden Mission
- Northern Hunan

- Xiangxi Synod (湘西區會)

- Finnish Missionary Society
- Western Hunan

- Xiangzhong Synod (湘中區會)

- Norwegian Missionary Society
- Central Hunan

- Yu’e Synod (豫鄂區會)

- United Lutheran Mission
- Henan and Hubei

- Yuzhong Synod (豫中區會)

- Augustana Synod Mission
- Central Henan

Oscar Wold was elected the first president of the LCC and a resolution was passed to request all LCC synods as well as other churches in China to observe the Chinese Mid-Autumn Festival; which falls on the 15th day of the 8th month of the Chinese calendar; as a Day of Thanksgiving.

==== Second General Assembly (1924) ====
The second assembly convened in Taohualun, Hunan, on March 30 to April 2, 1924, a year later than scheduled due to the political unrest in Hunan. The Lutheran College that had been promised by the Church of Sweden during the previous assembly was located there together with other institutions of the LCC because it was the working base of both the Norwegian Missionary Society and the Xiangzhong Synod. Unfortunately the Lutheran College could not survive the political upheavals that ravaged China during that period and was closed in 1931.

Two new synods were added to the LCC during this assembly:

- Yudong Synod (豫東區會)

- Lutheran Free Church Mission
- Eastern Henan

- Yuenan Synod (粵南區會)

- Schleswig-Holstein Evangelical Lutheran Mission
- Southern Guangdong

The management of the Lutheran Board of Publication was also transferred to the LCC and marked the first step towards the indigenisation of Chinese Lutheran literature work.

==== Third General Assembly (1928) ====
Continued political unrest in China delayed the convening of the third assembly from the fall of 1926 to May 1928. The venue was also changed from Xuchang, Henan, to the Lutheran Theological Seminary in Shekou. A revised Lutheran Book of Worship & Liturgy was adopted by this assembly and the following synods were added:

- Yuegan Synod (粵贛區會)

- Berlin Missionary Society
- Guangdong & Jiangxi

- Ludong Synod (魯東區會)

- United Lutheran Church of America
- Shandong

- Dongbei Synod (東北區會)

- Danish Mission Society
- Manchuria & the Northeast

==== Fourth General Assembly (1931) ====
The assembly was convened in Qingdao, Shandong, on June 21–28, 1931. Among the important resolutions passed during this assembly was the establishment of a 1:1 quota for Chinese and non-Chinese representatives from each synod to the national council and the establishment of the Qingdao Lutheran Bible School for Women.

==== Fifth General Assembly (1934) ====
The assembly was convened in the YMCA in Shanghai on June 10–15, 1934. Regulations and principles were drafted and approved regarding the invitation of non Lutheran revivalists. This was in view of the growing revivalist movement in China marked by the ministries of individuals like John Sung, Wang Mingdao, and others that had affected many Lutheran churches both positively and negatively.

==== Sixth General Assembly (1937) ====
This was the last pre-war assembly to be convened, and it was held on June 13–18, 1937, in Loyang, Henan. Far-reaching plans were made, including the release of a statement on social issues from a Lutheran perspective, the establishing of a Youth Committee, and the expansion of theological training and literature work. Also notable was the decision made to excommunicate members who participated in the practice of concubinage and polygyny.

==== Seventh General Assembly (1946) ====
The assembly was originally scheduled to be held in Guangzhou, Guangdong, in 1940 but had to be postponed due to the Sino-Japanese War. It was finally held on October 21–25, 1946, in the Lutheran Theological Seminary at Shekou. According to an incomplete survey, church membership increased by 62% from the reported membership of 47,473 in the last assembly to 76,953 immediately after the war.

Several important resolutions were also passed including a decision to apply for membership in the newly formed Lutheran World Federation (LWF) and to send a delegation to the First Assembly of the LWF to be held in Lund, Sweden, in 1947, and to invite the Lutheran Church–Missouri Synod related Evangelical Lutheran Mission for China to join the Lutheran Board of Publications.

The following synods were also accepted to the LCC:

- Yu’eshaan Synod (豫鄂陝區會)

- Norwegian Lutheran China Mission Association
- Hubei, Henan and Shaanxi

- Shaannan Synod (陝南區會)

- Norwegian Evangelical Lutheran Free Church Mission
- Southern Shaanxi

Due to changing circumstances and the rapid development of the Chinese Civil War, the Seventh General Assembly, proved to be last full assembly held by the Lutheran Church of China.

==== Eight General Assembly (1949) ====
Due to the fall of most of mainland China to the forces of the Chinese Communist Party and the continued fighting in other parts of China, the scheduled assembly in Guangzhou, Guangdong, on October 10, 1949, could not be held. An attempt to move the assembly to Hong Kong also turned out to be impossible. The National President, Peng Fu, who was in Hong Kong at that time, finally decided to hold a National Council meeting instead.

The 27th Council met in Tao Fong Shan, Shatin, Hong Kong, on November 4–5, 1949. Tao Fong Shan has been the centre of the Christian Mission to Buddhists (道友會) since 1930 and was also the temporary campus of the Lutheran Theological Seminary after its evacuation from Shekou on December 1, 1948.

Four new members were accepted into the LCC:

- Yuxi Church (Yuxi Synod / 豫西區會)

- American Lutheran Brethren Mission
- Eastern Henan

- Lixian Synod (Yuedong Synod / 粵東區會)

- Rhenish Missionary Society
- Eastern Guangdong

- Chongzhen Synod (Yuexi Synod / 粵西區會)

- Basel Mission
- Western Guangdong

- Daoyou Synod (Hong Kong Synod / 香港區會)

- Christian Mission to Buddhists
- Hong Kong

By LCC regulations, these four synods were to be renamed according to the area in which they worked (as shown in the names in parentheses above). However, since both the Rhenish and Basel missions had been at work for more than 100 years, and the nature of the work of the Daoyouhui had been very different, it was difficult to decide on which names that the new synods were to adopt. However, as the political situation in China was changing, this matter was eventually dropped altogether.

By now, the large majority of the Lutheran missions working in China at that time had joined the LCC and according to incomplete published statistics, the LCC had a total of 104,799 members, making it one of the largest Protestant churches in China.

=== The Lutheran Church in China (1950–1951) ===
On January 25, 1951, with the National President unable to return to China, the LCC called an extended Council meeting in Hankou under the leadership of Yu Jun, the National Vice-President. In this meeting, it was decided that:

- The name of the LCC be changed from Zhonghua Xinyihui (中華信義會) or the Lutheran Church of China to Zhongguo Xinyihui (中國信義會) or The Lutheran Church in China (TLCC);
- To abolish the 16 synods and reorganise the TLCC into five geographical zones;
- To dismiss Peng Fu as National President and replace him with Yu Jun;
- To carry out the principles of the Three-Self Patriotic Movement with determination;
- To join the National Council of Churches in China;
- To sever all ties with any missions, churches, and organisations based in Hong Kong;
- To stop sending students to the Lutheran Theological Seminary in Hong Kong and invite patriotic students to return to China.

This episode effectively ended the existence of the LCC as an entity in China and by 1958, the TLCC was also abolished with the introduction of union worship and imposition of "post-denominationalism" by the Three-Self Patriotic Movement.

== Organisation and structure ==
The LCC was organised on four levels: General Assembly, synod, district, and congregation. The General Assembly was to meet once every three years to elect a National Council headed by a National President. The synod and district levels met annually to elect a synod council and district council respectively and the congregations elected a deacons board annually.

=== Presidents ===
- 1920-1924: Rev Oscar R. Wold (Yu'e Synod)
- 1924-1928: Rev Arstrup Larsen (Yu'e Synod)
- 1928: Rev Oscar R. Wold (Yu'e Synod); died in office
- 1928-1931: Rev Zu Qiwu (Xiangzhong Synod)
- 1931-1937: Rev Zhu Haorang (Yu'e Synod)
- 1937-1951: Rev Dr Peng Fu (Yu'e Synod)

== Legacy ==
Although the LCC lasted only 30 years as an organised entity in China, its legacy to the development of Lutheranism in East Asia has been substantial. Many Lutheran Churches in Hong Kong, Taiwan, Malaysia, and Singapore trace their beginnings to the work and missions of the LCC.

=== Hong Kong ===
Of the eight Lutheran churches in Hong Kong, six can trace the legacy of the LCC in their work:

- Tsung Tsin Mission of Hong Kong (基督教香港崇真會)

The church was established by missionaries of the Basel Mission and was a district of the Chongzhen Church in eastern Guangdong. The mission joined the LCC as part of the Chongzhen (Yuexi) Synod in 1949 until the dissolution of the LCC in 1951. In 1952, it registered with the Hong Kong government under a new constitution.

- Chinese Rhenish Church Hong Kong Synod (中華基督教禮賢會香港區會)

The church was established by missionaries of the Barmen Missionary Society and was a district of the Lixian Church in western Guangdong. The church joined the LCC as part of the Lixian (Yuedong) Synod in 1949 until the dissolution of the LCC in 1951. On June 1, 1951, it was registered as an independent church with the Hong Kong government.

- Evangelical Lutheran Church of Hong Kong (香港信義會)

The work was begun by students and faculty of the Lutheran Theological Seminary together with the expelled missionaries from China, who had worked together with the LCC. By pedigree, it can be viewed as the successor church to the LCC. It was formally established on February 24, 1954, with the Rev Dr Peng Fu as its first president.

- Hong Kong and Macau Lutheran Church (港澳信義會)

The work was begun by missionaries from the Norwegian Lutheran Mission who had previously worked with the Yu'eshaan Synod and had evacuated to Hong Kong after 1949. They were joined by the Rev Liu Daosheng, the previous president of the Yu'eshaan Synod, who was stranded in China due to the sudden change in the political status of China. In 1960, the Yu'eshaan Lutheran Church became the Norwegian Lutheran Mission. They were one of the founding members of the Evangelical Lutheran Church of Hong Kong but withdrew in 1969 due to a disagreement. In 1978, the mission decided to begin transferring its operations to a self-supporting local church and on November 18 of the same year, the Hong Kong and Macau Lutheran Church was officially established.

- South Guangdong Lutheran Church (粵南信義會)

The church is a successor of the work of the Yuenan Synod of the LCC. In 1962, following a sudden increase in refugees from China, Rev Leung Sin-Sang, a member of the former Yuenan Synod was called by the North Elbian Mission Centre to start work in Hong Kong. He initially focused on the refugees from Hepu, one of the districts of the former Yuenan Synod.

- Christian Mission to Buddhists (基督東亞道友會/道風山基督教叢林)

The mission was the former Daoyou Synod of the LCC. It now functions more as an organisation than as a church although congregational work still exists on a small scale. A monastery was built in Tao Fong Shan in 1936 and remains a popular retreat centre in Hong Kong. In 1984, the Tao Fong Shan Lutheran congregation became a member of the Evangelical Lutheran Church of Hong Kong. The Institute of Sino-Christian Studies was established in 1995 to promote the contextualization of Christian theology in Chinese culture and to further develop dialogue with other cultures and religions.

=== Taiwan ===
There are six Lutheran churches in Taiwan, of which five can trace the legacy of the LCC in their work:

- Taiwan Lutheran Church (台灣信義會)

The church was started by the work of former LCC members and expelled missionaries from China who had worked with the LCC. In April 1950, Chin Chung-an, a medical doctor from Xi'an conducted family meetings in his residence in Kaoshiung. On June 3, 1951, the Kaoshiung congregation was established and 59 people were baptised. On November 1, 1954, the church was officially established.

- Lutheran Church of the Republic of China (中國基督教信義會)

Similar to the Hong Kong and Macau Lutheran Church, this church was started by missionaries from the Norwegian Lutheran Mission who had previously worked with the Yu’eshaan Synod. In 1952, Sigrun Omestad began work in Taipei and later that year, Rev Liu Daosheng, who had previously worked with the mission in Hong Kong was called to serve as pastor. In 1978, the mission decided to begin transferring its operations to a self-supporting local church and by 1985 the church was officially established as an independent organisation.

- Chinese Lutheran Brethren Church (中華基督教信義會)

In 1951, A. E. Nyhus, a missionary of the Lutheran Brethren China Mission who had worked with the Yuxi Synod of the LCC, arrived in Taiwan. He was joined later that year by Rev Tu Chang-Wu, the former president of the Yuxi Synod and work began among the family members of the military. In 1958, an independent church was established.

- Evangelical Lutheran Free Church of Taiwan (中華基督教福音信義會)

In 1954, the Norwegian Evangelical Lutheran Free Church Mission (NLF) sent the Rev J. T. Johansen Jr who had previously worked with the Shaannan Synod of the LCC to work under the Taiwan Lutheran Church (TLC). In 1961, the NLF decided to separate from the TLC and conduct their work independently. The mission was established as the Evangelical Lutheran Free Church of Taiwan in August 1973 with the Rev Xiong Ming-Xiang elected as the first chairman.

- Lutheran Church of Taiwan (Republic of China) (中華民國台灣基督教信義會)

On September 4, 1955, the Rev Toivo Koskikallio, president of the Lutheran Theological Seminary in Hong Kong, was asked by the Finnish Missionary Society to study the establishment of a mission in Taiwan. In October 1956, in response to Koskikallio's study, the FMS sent the Rev Päivö Parviainen and Ms Elma Aaltonen to Taiwan. All three missionaries had worked with the Xiangxi Synod of the LCC before. On April 3, 1977, the Lutheran Church of Taiwan was established and the Rev Ye Bo-Xiang was elected President.

=== Malaysia and Singapore ===
Of the four Lutheran churches in Malaysia, two can trace the legacy of the LCC in their work:

- Basel Christian Church of Malaysia (馬來西亞基督教巴色會)

The Basel Christian Church of Malaysia (BCCM) was established among the Hakka speaking refugees of the failed Taiping Rebellion in China. Because the leader of the Rebellion, Hong Xiuquan, was a Hakka speaking Christian, the Hakka speaking Basel Mission was viewed with great suspicion by the Qing Government of China. When the British North Borneo Company sought to recruit Chinese labourers to develop North Borneo, Rudolph Lechler of the Basel Mission enthusiastically supported the scheme. The first Chinese Basel Christians arrived in Lausan, North Borneo, in 1882 and the Lausan Church was built in 1886. In 1925, the Borneo Self-Governing Basel Church was established with the Rev Huang Tian-Yu elected as the first president. In 1966, the present name was adopted and the BCCM, with 45,000 members, is now the largest Lutheran church of LCC origin.
- Lutheran Church in Malaysia (馬新基督教信義會)

In 1952, the Lutheran World Federation convened the First Southeast Asia Lutheran Consultation in Penang, appealing to Lutheran churches worldwide to respond to the spiritual needs of more than 500,000 ethnic Chinese who were stranded in New Villages set up by the Malayan government to counter the threat posed by the Communist Party of Malaya during the Malayan Emergency. Among the first who responded was Dr Paul Anspach (formerly of the Yu-e Synod of the LCC) of the United Lutheran Church in America and Dr Peng Fu (previous president of the LCC) who represented the Hong Kong Lutheran churches. The Lutheran Church in Malaysia was established in 1963. After the expulsion of Singapore from the Malaysian Federation in 1965, the name was changed to the Lutheran Church in Malaysia and Singapore (LCMS). In 1996, the Singapore District of the LCMS became an independent body known as the Lutheran Church in Singapore. In 2012, the name of the church body in Malaysia reverted to the Lutheran Church in Malaysia.

The Lutheran churches in Singapore are organised under one national body which originated as a mission by LCC-related missionaries and workers.

- Lutheran Church in Singapore (新加坡信義會)

In 1960, the United Lutheran Church in America mission in Malaya extended its work to Singapore. The churches in Singapore formed the Singapore District of the LCMS until it became an independent national church in 1996 with the name the Lutheran Church in Singapore.

== See also ==
- Protestantism in China
- Christianity in China
- 19th-century Protestant missions in China
- Tao Fung Shan Christian Centre
- Lutheran Church in Malaysia and Singapore
