= Lutheran Church in Malaysia =

One of four Lutheran bodies in Malaysia

- Seal of the LCM
- Classification: Protestant
- Orientation: Lutheran
- Polity: Interdependent local, regional, and national expressions with modified episcopal polity
- Leader: Thomas Low Kok Chan
- Associations: LWF, ALC, FELCMS, CCM, CFM, CCA, WCC
- Region: Malaysia
- Origin: 1963
- Branched from: United Lutheran Church in America (today Evangelical Lutheran Church in America)
- Congregations: 70
- Members: 6,736 baptised
- Official website: www.lcm.org.my

The Lutheran Church in Malaysia or LCM (Malay: Gereja Lutheran di Malaysia) is one of four Lutheran bodies in Malaysia. It currently has 52 congregations nationwide with a total of 6,736 baptised members and is the largest entirely Lutheran body in the country. Until 2012, the body was known as the Lutheran Church in Malaysia and Singapore.

The current bishop of the Lutheran Church in Malaysia is Thomas Low Kok Chan was installed on 4 December 2021.

== History ==
=== Early history ===
The first Lutherans to arrive in what is now Malaysia were Hakka Taiping Rebellion refugees from China closely linked to Theodore Hamberg and Rudolph Lechler of the Basel Mission Society. While it is not certain when they first arrived in British North Borneo, there was already a significant Chinese presence at the founding of the town of Sandakan in 1874. These refugees eventually organised themselves into what is today known as the Basel Christian Church of Malaysia.

The LCM traces its history to the eviction of foreign Christian missionaries from mainland China in 1953 after the establishment of the People's Republic of China. Some missionaries from the United Lutheran Church in America were stationed to northern Malaya and worked among the ethnic Chinese community that were relocated to the New Villages as part of an attempt to stem the influence of the Communist Party of Malaya during the Malayan Emergency.

=== The Lutheran mission in Malaya ===
In 1952, the Lutheran World Federation's Commission on Younger Churches and Orphaned Missions (CYCOM) requested bishop Johannes Sandegren of the Tamil Evangelical Lutheran Church to convene a joint Lutheran consultative conference to investigate the feasibility of establishing organised Lutheran work among the ethnic Chinese community in the New Villages in Malaya. The meeting was convened as the First Southeast Asia Lutheran Consultative Conference from the 26th to 29 March 1952 at the Wesley Methodist Church in Penang.

The Board of Foreign Missions of the United Lutheran Church in America (BFM-ULCA) responded to the decision of the conference by sending Dr. Paul Anspace, a former missionary to China, to conduct a field assessment of Malaya. Missionary work formally began in 1953 with Anspach appointed as the Staff Secretary of the Malayan mission. Apart from missionaries from the BFM-ULCA, the mission was also reinforced by evangelists from Hong Kong and China at the suggestion of Dr. Peng Fu, the exiled president of the Lutheran Church of China.

Upon consultation with the Malayan Christian Council, work was first established in the New Villages of Semenyih, Cheras 11th Mile and Balakong. Mission work expanded to other New Villages in Perak, particularly in Ipoh and Gerik. Mission work in urban areas was initiated in Petaling Jaya in 1954.

=== Towards autonomy ===
In 1957, the Administrative Council of Missionaries of the United Lutheran Church in America and Malaya (Administrative Council) was established to more effectively administer the Lutheran mission in Malaya. As early as 1958, efforts were made to make the mission self-supporting to prepare it for autonomy and independence from the American church. This resulted in fewer mission areas being opened and the curtailment of employment of new workers from Hong Kong. On the other hand, it helped the nascent Lutheran mission achieve self-sufficiency in a much shorter period compared to other mission groups in Malaya then.

=== Attempts to establish a national church ===
In 1962, at the initiative of Bertil Envall of the Church of Sweden Mission, representatives of the Tamil Lutherans and the Administrative Council met for negotiations in a Joint Constitution Committee to set up a national Lutheran Church for Malaya. Representatives from the Batak Lutheran community supported by the Huria Kristen Batak Protestant were also invited but declined to participate.

Despite agreeing on organisation and stewardship in general, disagreements arose upon the form of church government for the proposed national church. While the Swedish mission and the Tamil Lutherans was partial to an episcopal polity, it was not accepted by the representatives of the Administrative Council who felt that the local Chinese Lutherans would not be familiar with that form of government. There were also disagreements on the nature of apostolic succession as well as the significant differences in the culture, language and origins between the Tamils and Chinese who were ministered by the respective missions, the former consisting mainly of established Tamil Lutheran families while the latter consisted mainly of congregations of young individual Chinese who were first generation Christians.

As a result, two Lutheran church bodies were established in Malaya; the Tamil Evangelical Lutheran Church districts in Malaya were reconstituted as the Evangelical Lutheran Church in Malaysia and Singapore (ELCMS) on 13 August 1962 whereas the mainly Chinese congregations of the American Mission was organised the Lutheran Church in Malaya (later renamed the Lutheran Church in Malaysia and after Singapore's independence in 1965, the Lutheran Church in Malaysia and Singapore or LCMS) a year later on 3 August 1963.

=== Establishment of the LCMS ===
Mission work extended southwards; first towards Kuala Lumpur and soon afterwards to Singapore, which was then considered part of Malaya. The LCMS was formally established in 1963 with two districts in Peninsular Malaysia and one district encompassing Singapore. By 1978, all established congregations were financially self-supporting and together assumed support for the administrative budget of the LCMS central office.

In August 1996 the Singapore District separated from the LCMS and was gazetted as the independent Lutheran Church in Singapore to reflect the fact that Malaysia and Singapore had been separate countries politically since 1965. LCMS continued to retain the word "Singapore" in its name for legal purposes until 2011 when the Church in Convention agreed to formally change the name back to the Lutheran Church in Malaysia.

=== Missions ===
The LCM has seen steady growth over the years with a 10.8% growth in membership recorded in 2006 and also actively supports mission work among the Senoi and Jahai people of West Malaysia and overseas mission work in Kyrgyzstan and Myanmar (in partnership with the Myanmar Lutheran Church).

=== Bombing in Myanmar ===
On 7 May 2005, a series of coordinated bombings occurred in the city of Yangon, Myanmar. Eleven people were killed in the attack, and among the 162 people that were injured was a member of the LCMS mission team to Myanmar.

== Beliefs and practices ==
The LCM is a member church of the Lutheran World Federation, a communion of Lutheran Churches throughout the world. As a church in the Lutheran tradition, it accepts the teachings found in the unaltered Augsburg Confession, Luther's Small Catechism and other confessional articles and symbols of the Book of Concord.

The LCM accepts the ordination of women as co-workers and pastors in the denomination, and a significant percentage of their full-time workers are women. To date no women have been appointed as bishops.

=== Languages in use ===
Most services conducted by the LCM congregations are in Mandarin and the other varieties of Chinese commonly spoken in West Malaysia like Hokkien and Cantonese. English language services are becoming increasingly common, with some congregations using English exclusively, and some congregations have started Malay and Tamil services. Senoi language services are conducted almost exclusively with the Senoi congregations.

=== The LUTHER Plan ===
In 2006, the LCM adopted a four-year ministry development plan dubbed the LUTHER Plan that seeks to chart the development of "the spiritual and material aspects of the Church, and also her contribution to the society." It has a sixfold focus based on an acronym formed by the name of Martin Luther: Lutheran identity, Unity in ministry, Transformation of lives, Human resource development, Expansion in mission, and Renewal of structure.

== Structure and organisation ==
=== Overview ===
The highest decision-making body of the LCM is the General Assembly ("Biennial Convention" until 2011), a group of elected lay and ordained voting members from each congregation which meets every two years and elects an Executive Council headed by a bishop (president until 1974). While the Biennial Convention is in recess, authority is delegated to the executive council.

The LCM is divided into five full regional districts and one provisional district headed by a dean. The districts of the LCM act as the middle judicatory of the church. Specialized subcommittees and divisions include structures to support missions, education, social concerns, and youth ministries.

The Ministerium, consisting of the ordained pastors of the church, attends to matters of doctrine, nurture and spiritual care. On the local congregation level, local church councils run the various LCM congregations. All properties of the local congregations are owned by the LCM.

=== List of Districts and Provisional Districts ===
- Northern District

Dean: Rev. Daniel Koo
Congregations in the states of Kedah, Penang and Perak

- Central District 1

Dean: Rev. Tan Hee Ming
Congregations in the state of Selangor apart from Petaling District

- Central District 2

Dean: Rev. Philip Tan
Congregations in the Federal Territory of Kuala Lumpur and the state of Sarawak

- Central District 3

Dean: Rev. Alvin Tan
Congregations in the Petaling District of the state of Selangor

- OA (Orang Asli) district

Dean: Rev. Andry Alang
Congregations in the states of Perak and Pahang

- Provisional Southern district

Dean: Rev. Andrew Goh
Congregations in the states of Melaka and Johor

=== Presidents & Bishops of the LCM ===
When the LCM was constituted in 1963, the title of the head of the Executive Council was President. The title was changed to Bishop in 1974. As the LCM is not organised with an episcopal polity, retiring Bishops are not granted the title Bishop Emeritus automatically. Instead the title is conferred by the General Assembly.

- 1963-1964

Paul Alberti

- 1964-1969

Ray Nyce

- 1969-1977

Carl Fisher
Title changed to Bishop in 1974
Bishop Emeritus since 2005

- 1977-1985

Peter Foong Siew Kong
Bishop Emeritus since 2005

- 1985-1993

Daniel Chong Hoi Khen
Bishop Emeritus since 2005

- 1993-2005

Gideon Chang (Teo King Chew)
Bishop Emeritus since 2005

- 2005–2013

Philip Lok Oi Peng

- 2013–2021

Aaron Yap Chuan Ching

- 2021-present

Thomas Low Kok Chan

== Schools and colleges ==
The LCM operates the Lutheran Bible Training Institute in Kuala Lumpur and is also a participating member in the governing councils of Seminari Theoloji Malaysia and the Sabah Theological Seminary.

In addition, the LCM operates many pre-school education and special schools among the congregations to serve the local community faithfully.

== Affiliations ==
The LCM participates actively in ecumenical relationships through:

- Council of Churches of Malaysia
  - Christian Federation of Malaysia
  - Christian Conference of Asia
  - World Council of Churches
- Federation of Evangelical Lutheran Churches in Malaysia & Singapore
  - Basel Christian Church of Malaysia
  - Evangelical Lutheran Church in Malaysia
  - Lutheran Church in Singapore
  - Protestant Church in Sabah
- Lutheran World Federation
  - Asia Lutheran Communion
- Malaysian Consultative Council of Buddhism, Christianity, Hinduism, Sikhism and Taoism

The LCM also works in partnership with:

- Evangelical Lutheran Church in America, Southeastern Synod
- Evangelical Lutheran Church in Bavaria
- Lutheran Church of Australia
- Myanmar Lutheran Church

== See also ==
- Christianity in Malaysia
- Lutheran Church in Singapore
