= Bertil Envall =

Swedish bishop and missionary

- Born: October 29, 1909; Annedal, Gothenburg
- Died: November 23, 2011 (aged 102); Backa, Gothenburg
- Known for: Bishop Emeritus of the Evangelical Lutheran Church in Malaysia and Singapore

Bertil Envall (29 October 1909, Annedal, Gothenburg - 23 November 2011, Backa, Gothenburg) was a Swedish Lutheran missionary and bishop emeritus of the Evangelical Lutheran Church in Malaysia. He was the son of a business manager, Gustaf Envall, and Bertha Svedberg.

== Early career ==
After his ordination in Gothenburg in 1934, Envall served as a missionary of the Church of Sweden Mission in South India from 1937 to 1954. He then returned to Sweden and served as the vicar in the parish of Foss in Bohuslän.

== Serving in Malaya ==
He was asked to serve as the superintendent of the Evangelical Lutheran Church in Malaysia and Singapore in 1961 and was elected and consecrated as the bishop of the church in 1965 and 1966 respectively.

== Attempts at Lutheran unity in Malaya ==
Envall was instrumental in initiating a consultative dialogue between the congregations established by missionaries of the United Lutheran Church in America among the ethnic Chinese and the Tamil congregations led by the Tamil Evangelical Lutheran Church and the Swedish mission in Malaya with the intention of establishing a single Lutheran church in Malaya.

Despite agreeing on organisation and stewardship in general, disagreements arose upon the form of church government for the proposed national church. While the Swedish mission and the Tamil Lutherans was partial to an episcopal polity, it was not accepted by the representatives of the American mission who felt that the local Chinese Lutherans would not be familiar with that form of government. There were also disagreements on the nature of apostolic succession as well as the significant differences in the culture, language and origins between the Tamils and Chinese who were ministered by the respective missions, the former consisting mainly of established Tamil Lutheran families while the latter consisted mainly of congregations of young individual Chinese who were first generation Christians.

As a result, two Lutheran church bodies were established in Malaya; the Tamil Evangelical Lutheran Church districts in Malaya were reconstituted as the Evangelical Lutheran Church in Malaysia and Singapore (ELCMS) on 13 August 1962 whereas the mainly Chinese congregations of the American Mission was organised the Lutheran Church in Malaya (later renamed the Lutheran Church in Malaysia and after Singapore's independence in 1965, the Lutheran Church in Malaysia and Singapore) a year later on 3 August 1963.

== Retirement and death ==
Envall retired and returned to Sweden in 1977 where he stayed until his death on 23 November 2011.

== Sources ==
- Core of original article translated from the Swedish Wikipedia

Religious titles
Preceded by Position established	Bishop of the Evangelical Lutheran Church in Malaysia and Singapore; 1965–1976	Succeeded by E. B. Muthusami
