= Evangelical Lutheran Church in Malaysia =

One of four Lutheran bodies in Malaysia

- Emblem of the ELCM
- Classification: Protestant
- Orientation: Lutheran
- Polity: Episcopal
- Leader: Steven Lawrence
- Associations: LWF, ALC, FELCMS, CCM, CFM, CCA, WCC
- Region: Malaysia
- Origin: 1962
- Branched from: Tamil Evangelical Lutheran Church
- Congregations: 21
- Members: 3,650

The Evangelical Lutheran Church in Malaysia or ELCM is one of the four Lutheran bodies in Malaysia. It currently has 21 congregations nationwide with a total of 3,650 members.

The current bishop of the ELCM is Steven Lawrence.

== History ==
=== Early history ===
The history of the ELCM can be traced back to the large scale immigration of Indians from the Tamil speaking areas of India from the 19th to 20th century to British Malaya as cheap labourers in plantations. Among the many migrants were Tamil Lutheran Christians from churches started by the work of the Danish-Halle Mission and Bartholomäus Ziegenbalg.

By 1900, missionaries from the India-based Leipzig Evangelical Lutheran Mission who visited Penang had found 315 Tamil Lutherans and by 1907, the first congregation was organised in Brickfields, Kuala Lumpur through the effort of Rev. Thiruchilluvai Joseph, a pastor from the church that was later organised as the Tamil Evangelical Lutheran Church (TELC).

1901–357 Lutherans who migrated to Malaya were found by Rev. Thiruchilluvai Joseph of TELC who later came to reside in Kuala Lumpur in November 1906. 1902—Gerching of Leipzig Evangelical Lutheran Mission came to Singapore in 1902 to take survey of the Tamil Lutherans in Malaya.

1903–1905—During these years as there had been no organised Lutheran congregations, many Tamil Lutherans attended worship in other churches and a considerable number joined other denominations. There were a number, however, remained strong in their loyalty to the Lutheran Church. The Lutherans were willing to support and attend the new church, but not to become full members. For a time, Lutherans in Kuala Lumpur attended the Anglican Church and later the Methodist Tamil Church on Malacca Street. Vedavanam (Anglican) and S. Abraham (Methodist) cared for their spiritual needs. As the years passed, they grew, and by the time they had reached 70 in number they thought of establishing a Church of their own. Reports of missionary visits and request from Malaya no doubt generated interest back in India.

1906—On 11 November, Pamperrien of the Leipzig Lutheran Mission visited Malaya to survey and assess the possibility of establishing a Lutheran ministry.

1907—On receiving positive feedback, Rev. Thiruchilluvai Joseph immediately set about organising the Tamil Lutherans for regular divine services, the first of which was held on 30 January 1907 in a shop house at Scott Road off Brickfields in Kuala Lumpur. This day marked the beginning of a consolidated effort to establish Lutheran work in Malaysia. Simultaneously, the Leipzig Mission also assigned Ratnam, a school teacher turned catechist, to assist the work in the Penang area.

1908 —Following K. Pamperrien's visit, the Leipzig Mission in India showed greater interest in Malaysia and launched a constructive programme of development for the spread of Lutheranism. The immediate problem was identified in the lack of personnel to consolidate the work. Therefore, both the TELC in India and Leipzig Mission deployed missionaries for the work in Malaysia. The first Leipzig Lutheran missionary, Hermann Matthes arrived in 1908; the Lutheran population during this period was about 516 persons. Hermann Matthes helped to meet the spiritual needs of the Lutheran community in Penang area. By 1912, the Lutheran population had increased to 645 but was scattered in some 77 places in Malaysia and Singapore. This increase was due to the establishment of new contacts. The initial work among the Lutherans in Malaysia was not evangelistic in character but it sought to meet the sacramental needs of the members. Concerted evangelistic work among people of other faiths began after 1963.

1909—On 2 June a piece of land was purchased for construction of Zion church with money contributed by Leipzig Mission. The land was purchased for RM 2,900.00.

1910–1925— Matthes apparently left Penang. During the next fifteen years, the attention and work in Kuala Lumpur was directed to towards the building of the church. Matthews was replaced by Traugott Ruger, another German missionary from India. The outbreak of World War 1 resulted in T. Ruger being called back after a brief ministry in Malaysia. The enormous task of providing pastoral care for the Tamil Lutherans nationwide became the responsibility of Rev Thiruchilluvai Joseph, who was based in Kuala Lumpur. Rev. Thiruchilluvai Joseph to India and was replaced by Swamimuthu Muthusami on 11 November 1921. On 11 November 1922, the Foundation stone for Zion Church was laid by E. Heuman (First Bishop of Tranquebar). On 30 November 1924, J. Sandegren dedicated the Zion Church building (President of the CSM in South India, later third bishop of Tranquebar).

Early efforts to organise and build up the pastoral care of the Tamil Lutherans in Malaya were spearheaded by missionaries from the TELC and the Leipzig Evangelical Lutheran Mission. By 1922, the organised congregations were divided into two regional circles of the TELC; the Northern Malaya District and the Southern Malaya District; centred in Penang and Kuala Lumpur respectively.

=== Attempts to establish a national church ===
After the Second World War, missionary work among the Tamil Lutherans in Malaya was supplemented by workers from the Church of Sweden Mission (CSM) and with the impending independence of Malaya in 1957, effort was made towards establishing a national church.

In 1962, at the initiative of Bertil Envall of the Swedish Mission, representatives of the CSM and the Administrative Council of the American Lutheran mission to Chinese Lutherans in Malaya met for negotiations in a Joint Constitution Committee to set up a national Lutheran Church for Malaya. Representatives from the Batak Lutheran community supported by the Huria Kristen Batak Protestant were also invited but declined to participate.

Despite agreeing on organisation and stewardship in general, disagreements arose upon the form of church government for the proposed national church. While the Swedish mission and the TELC order was partial to an episcopal polity, it was not accepted by the American missionaries who felt that the local Chinese Lutherans would not be familiar with that form of government. There were also disagreements on the nature of apostolic succession as well as the significant differences in the culture, language and origins between the Tamils and Chinese who were ministered by the respective missions, the former consisting mainly of established Tamil Lutheran families while the latter consisted mainly of congregations of young individual Chinese who were first generation Christians.

=== Establishment of the ELCM ===
As a result, two Lutheran church bodies were established in Malaya; the TELC districts in Malaya were reconstituted as the Evangelical Lutheran Church in Malaysia and Singapore (ELCMS) on 13 August 1962 whereas the mainly Chinese congregations of the American Mission was organised the Lutheran Church in Malaysia a year later on 3 August 1963 In 1966, Bertil Envall was consecrated as the first Bishop of the ELCMS.

On 31 October 1976, E.B. Muthusami was consecrated as the first local bishop. In 1994, due to the changes in legislation, congregations of the ELCMS in Singapore were separated and joined the Southern District of the Lutheran Church in Malaysia and Singapore to form the Lutheran Church in Singapore. The ELCMS was then renamed the ELCM.

=== Missions and social work ===
The ELCM actively supports local mission work as well as overseas mission work in Bangladesh, Myanmar, Indonesia and India. The ELCM pioneered work among people suffering from epilepsy when it set up a training centre for epileptic children in Hutan Melintang, Perak known as Bethany Home in the 1966.

== Beliefs and practices ==
The ELCM is a member church of the Lutheran World Federation, a communion of Lutheran Churches throughout the world. As a Church in the Lutheran tradition, it accepts and confesses the teachings found in the unaltered Augsburg Confession, Luther's Small Catechism and the other confessional articles and symbols of the Book of Concord.

=== Languages in use ===
Due to the historical heritage of the ELCM, Tamil and English remains the primary language of ministry and liturgy in the church, but the use of Malay has been increased over the last decade.

== Structure and organisation ==
=== Overview ===
The polity of the ELCM is episcopal in structure. A Bishop is elected for life by the Diocesan Assembly which meets annually to decide on policy matters and elect a Diocesan Council chaired by the bishop.

The ELCM is further divided into 3 geographical districts for administrative purposes.

=== Districts of the ELCM ===
- Northern District

Congregations in the states of Penang and Perak

- Central District

Congregations in the state of Selangor and the Federal Territory of Kuala Lumpur

- Southern District

Congregations in the states of Negeri Sembilan and Johor

=== Bishops of the ELCM ===
The current bishop, Steven Lawrence, is the fifth bishop of the ELCM and is responsible for the day-to-day administration, doctrinal, ministerial, pastoral, liturgical, ecclesiological, legislative and administrative matters of the church.

- 1966-1976

Bertil Envall

- 1976-1988

E. B. Muthusami

- 1988-2009

Julius Paul

- 2009–2020

Solomon Rajah

- 2020-present

Steven Lawrence

== Schools and colleges ==
ELCM congregations have been centres for pre-school education since the beginning and was a founding member of the governing council of Seminari Theologi Malaysia.

== Affiliations ==
The ELCM participates actively in ecumenical relationships through:

- Council of Churches of Malaysia ^{link}
  - Christian Federation of Malaysia
  - Christian Conference of Asia
  - World Council of Churches
- Federation of Evangelical Lutheran Churches in Malaysia & Singapore ^{link}
  - Basel Christian Church of Malaysia
  - Lutheran Church in Malaysia
  - Lutheran Church in Singapore
  - Protestant Church in Sabah
- Lutheran World Federation
  - Asia Lutheran Communion ^{link}
- Malaysian Consultative Council of Buddhism, Christianity, Hinduism, Sikhism and Taoism

The ELCM also works in partnership with:

- Church of Sweden

== See also ==
- Christianity in Malaysia
- Christianity in Singapore
