= Malaysia Theological Seminary =

Interdenominational Protestant seminary in Seremban, Negeri Sembilan, Malaysia

Seminari Theoloji Malaysia
- Seminari Theoloji Malaysia
- Type: Seminary
- Established: 6 January 1979
- Affiliations: Anglican (West Malaysia); Anglican (Sabah); Methodists; ELCMS (Lutheran); LCMS (Lutheran); Presbyterian; ATESEA
- President: Bishop Dr T. Jeyakumar
- Principal: Rev Dr Chong Siaw Fung
- Location: Seremban, Negeri Sembilan, Malaysia
- Website: www.stm.edu.my

Seminari Theoloji Malaysia - STM (English: Malaysia Theological Seminary; Chinese: 马来西亚神学院 ) is an interdenominational Protestant seminary in the city of Seremban, Negeri Sembilan, Malaysia. Established in 1979, STM is accredited by the Association for Theological Education in South East Asia (ATESEA) and a participating school of the South East Asia Graduate School of Theology (SEAGST) from which the Master of Theology degree is awarded.

== History ==
STM started as a joint-venture among the Anglican Diocese of West Malaysia, the Methodists and the Evangelical Lutheran Church of Malaysia and Singapore (ELCMS) in Malaysia and was opened on 6 January 1979 (Feast of Epiphany). Its stated aim in the Companies Act of Malaysia under which it was incorporated was "to provide education in the Christian faith for the service in the ministry, worship and witness of the Church." This venture built upon a 1974 collaboration between the Anglicans and the Evangelical Lutherans that saw the merger of the Christian Training Centre (founded by the Lutherans in 1969) and the St. Mark's Training Centre (founded by the Anglicans in 1970) that was called Kolej Theologi Malaysia (KTM) or Malaysia Theological College (in English).

Since then, other Christian denominations have joined STM's governing council and participated in the development of the seminary, including the Anglican Diocese of Sabah, the Presbyterians and the Lutherans (LCMS).

Before STM's relocation to its current premises in 1998, it had been operating from rented premises in the following locations:

- St.Mark's Anglican Church, Seremban, Negeri Sembilan, 1970-1979
- Zion Cathedral(ELCMS), Brickfields, Kuala Lumpur, 1979–1983
- Methodist High School, Sentul, Kuala Lumpur, 1983–1990
- Xavier's Hall (Roman Catholic), Petaling Jaya, 1990–1998

== Organisation ==
STM is governed by a council that is elected biennially. The founding members include the late Bishop C.N. Fang (Methodist), the late Bishop E.B. Muthusami (ELCM) and the late Bishop Tan Sri J.G. Savarimuthu (Anglican).

=== List of Principals ===
- Rev Datuk Dr Denis C. Dutton: 1979–1986
- Rev Dr Hwa Yung: 1986 - 2001
- Rev Dr Ezra Kok: 2001 - March 2015
- Rev Dr Philip Siew: April 2015 - March 2021
- Rev Dr Chong Siaw Fung: April 2021 - Present

== Academic programmes ==
STM offers both residential and extension academic programmes (through their Theological Education by Extension or TEE programme) leading to the awarding of the following qualifications:

=== Certificates and diplomas ===
- Certificate of Christian Ministry (CertCM)
- Social Ministry (in co-operation with Malaysian CARE and the Bible College of Malaysia)
- Diploma of Christian Ministry (DipCM)

=== Undergraduate ===
- Bachelor of Divinity (BD)
- Bachelor of Theology (BTh)

=== Postgraduate ===
- Graduate Diploma of Christian Studies (GradDipCS)
- Master of Christian Studies (MCS)
- Master of Divinity (MDiv)
- Master of Ministry (MMin)
- Master of Theology (MTh)
- Doctor of Ministry (DMin)

== See also ==
- Association for Theological Education in South East Asia
