= Sung Siew Secondary School =

Location
- Sandakan, Sabah; Malaysia
- Coordinates: 5.8444°N 118.1109°E

Information
- Type: Secondary school
- Motto: Faith, Zeal and Excellence; Iman, Tekad, Cemerlang
- Established: 1907
- Founder: The Rev. Yap Hyen Moo
- Grades: Bridge Class – Upper Six
- Enrollment: around 1500
- Affiliations: Basel Christian Church of Malaysia

Sung Siew Secondary School is a single-session secondary school located in the town of Sandakan, state of Sabah, East Malaysia. It is located at the foot of Trig Hill which is 2 kilometres away from Sandakan town centre. The school was established in 1907, making it one of the oldest schools in Sandakan.

The current principal of the school is Mr Kwok Chee Yen, who has occupied the post since 2020. There are around 75 staffs and 1500 students in the school. The school is also recognised as one of the leading secondary schools in the state.

== History ==
Sung Siew Secondary School is a part of the Basel Christian Church of Malaysia. The development of Basel Church schools was inspired by foreign settlers to provide education to their children.

Sung Siew has its origin in the year 1907, it was founded by the late Rev. Yap Hyen Moo, who was commissioned by the Basel Mission's Church at West Point in Hong Kong who was to be stationed in Sandakan as the first catechist school teacher. At first it was purely a Chinese-medium school and was firstly known as the Basel Mission School of Elopura, Sandakan. In 1910, a German pastor, Rev. Shie came from the Basel Mission in Basel, Switzerland and started the English section. He became the first principal. Since then, the school became known as ‘Sung Siew’ which means ‘Double Education (English and Chinese Language).’ Among a number of efficient and dedicated teachers at that time was the late Mr. Chung Yuk Fong (who was at one time the President of the Basel Christian Church of Malaysia in Sabah), who was well known for his dedication as a long-serving teacher in that.

In 1914, the First World War broke out and as a consequence, the English section of Sung Siew was compelled to close, but the Chinese section remain unaffected. During the ensuing three years after the first World War which ended in 1918, the school had financial and personnel difficulties and therefore the English section was not reopened until 1923.

At the end of 1941, the Japanese army arrived and occupied North Borneo and Sung Siew was compelled to close for the second time. It reopened in 1946/1947, firstly with the Chinese section and later the English section. The church and school suffered greatly during World War II. Leaders were killed and property was extensively destroyed and burnt. The school was faced with total rebuilding problems after the war. The only church property that was not destroyed during the World War II was an old rectory built by the Basel mission. This old building was later renovated for occupation by an American Lutheran missionary. In 1949 a double-storey wooden building costing about RM 16,000.00 was built with the aid of an outright donation of US$2,000.00 from the then Director of the Lutheran World Federation in Hong Kong, the late pastor Arthur S. Olson, and a single generous donation of RM2,000.00 from a member of the church, the late Mr. Wong Tet Siew.

== Current and former principals ==
Name	Served for Year
Rev. Yap Hyen Moo	1907–1909
Rev. Shie	1910–1912
Rev. F. Frize	1912–1914
Mr. Chong Fui Cho	> 1914
Mr. Wong Ken Khiam	1940s
Pastor Floyd E. Johnson	1951–1956
Mr. Liu Wai Man	1956
Pastor Kenneth Dugan	1956–1958
Mr. Lee Syn Ken	1958–1960
Mr. Jauss	1960
Dr. Lee Chun Min	1960–1962
Mr. Wang Chung Lin	1962
Pastor William Albertson	1962–1964
Pastor Carlyle Smith	1964–1967
Mr. Ken Hagesen	1967–1969
Mr. John Peterson	1969–1971
Mr. Moo Fah Lin	1972–1999
Miss Yap Pak Shun	1999–2004
Mr. Lee Chin Hoi	2005–2015
Madam Poh Siew Boon	2016–2021
Mr. Kwok Chee Yen	2021–present
