= Duchess of Kent Hospital =

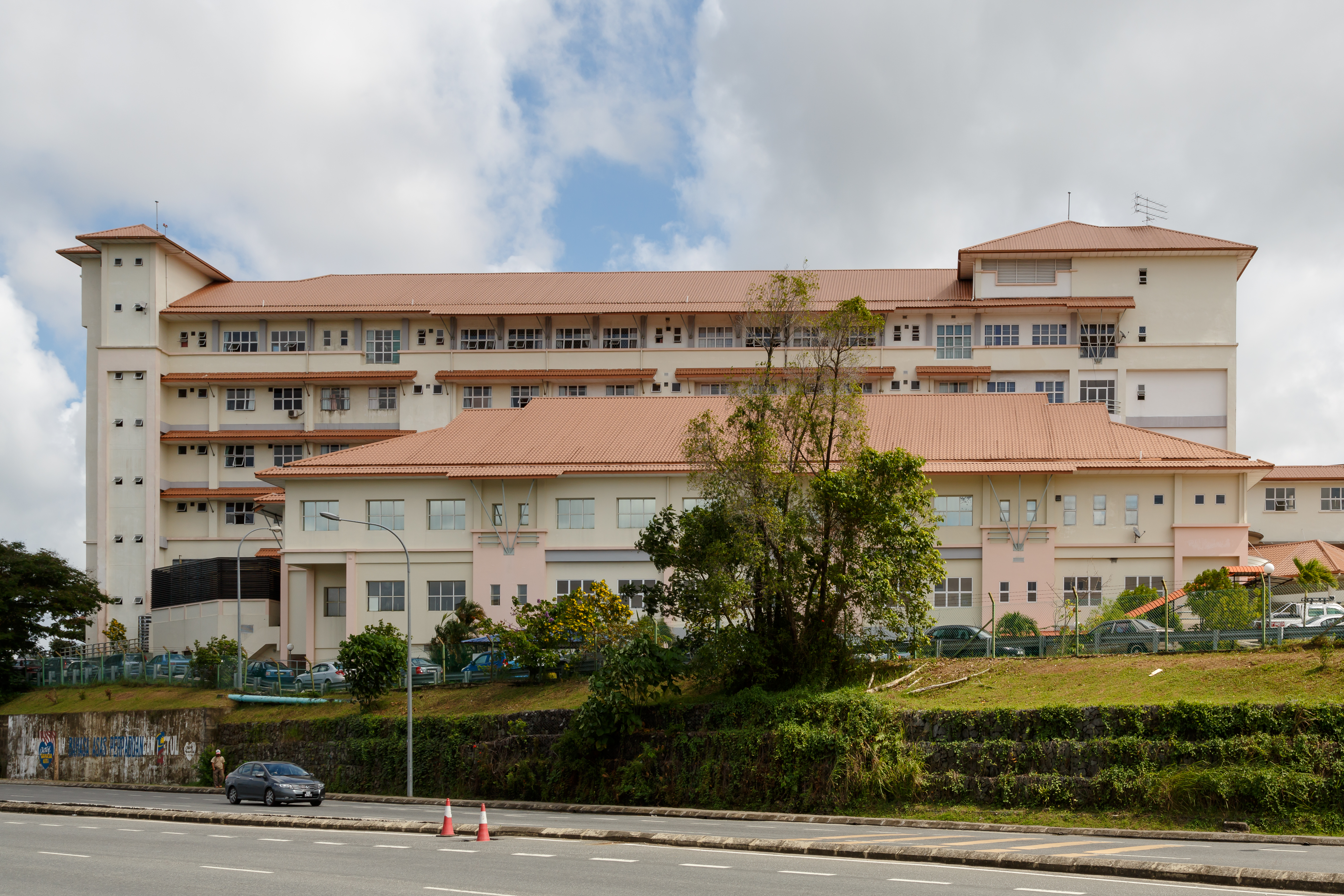
- The building of Duchess of Kent Hospital.

Geography
- Location: Sandakan, Sabah, Malaysia
- Coordinates: 5°51′31″N 118°6′12″E

Organisation
- Care system: Public
- Type: District General

Services
- Emergency department: Yes
- Beds: 400

History
- Founded: 1952

Links
- Website: hdok.moh.gov.my
- Lists: Hospitals in Malaysia

The Duchess of Kent Hospital (Malay: Hospital Duchess of Kent) is a government founded rural general hospital located around 3.2 kilometres (2.0 miles) from the town centre of Sandakan, Sabah, Malaysia. The hospital has an area around 17.37 hectares (42.93 acres), with the hospital buildings area comprising 2,245.3 square metres (24,168 square feet). The hospital is named after the British princess Marina, Duchess of Kent.

== History ==
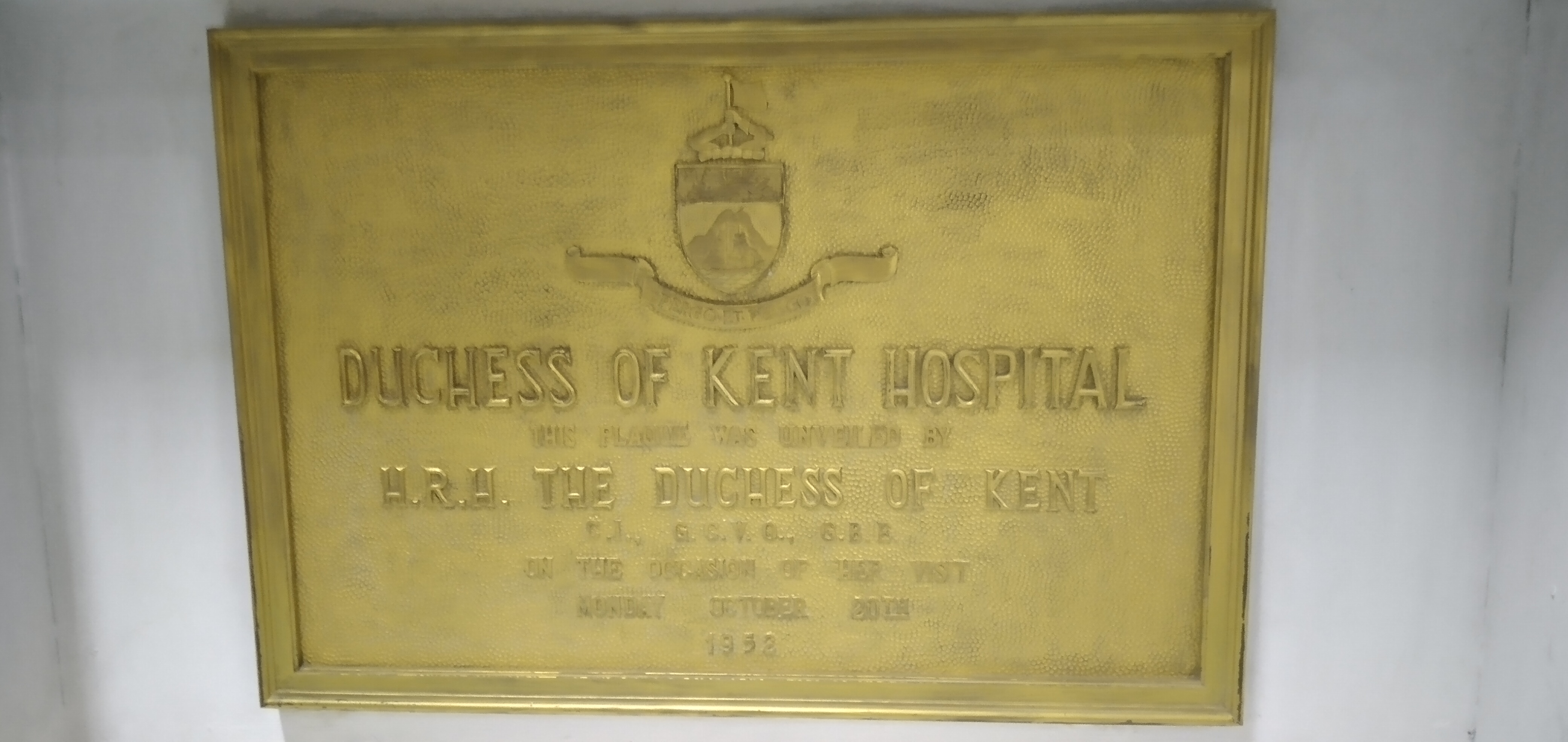
Opening plaque unveiled by the Duchess of Kent in 1952.

The site of the current Duchess of Kent hospital was the former site for the old wooden building that was built by the British in 1900. During the World War II, the old building was destroyed by the Japanese Army attacks. After the war ended, a modern building was then constructed by the British in 1951. The building was officiated by the Duchess of Kent on 20 October 1952 and named after her, before it was finally finished in 1953. Starting from 1996, the building underwent more renovation with the addition of more building blocks, with a specialist building constructed in 1999, a storage building in 2001, a forensic building in 2002 and an additional building for hospital wards in 2007.

== See also ==
- List of hospitals in Malaysia
