= Basel Christian Church of Malaysia =

Protestant denomination in Malaysia

Basel Christian Church of Malaysia Gorija Kristian Basel do Malaysia 馬來西亞基督教巴色會 Gereja Kristian Basel Malaysia
- Classification: Protestant
- Orientation: Lutheran, Reformed
- Associations: Lutheran World Federation, National Evangelical Christian Fellowship, Christian Federation of Malaysia, Council of Churches of Malaysia, Sabah Theological Seminary
- Region: Sabah and Labuan with mission churches in Sarawak and West Malaysia
- Origin: 1847; Qing dynasty, Hong Kong, Republic of China
- Separated from: Chongzhen Church (Tsung-Tsin Church)
- Branched from: Basel Missionary Society
- Separations: 1925
- Congregations: 112
- Members: 64,500 baptised
- Primary schools: 12
- Secondary schools: 3
- Tertiary institutions: 14
- Official website: www.bccm.org.my

The Basel Christian Church of Malaysia or BCCM (Malay: Gereja Kristian Basel Malaysia, Dusun: Gorija Kristian Basel do Malaysia), formerly known as Borneo Basel Self Established Church, is one of the four Lutheran bodies in Malaysia. In 2009 BCCM had 112 congregations nationwide and 63,000 baptised members. In 2023, BCCM had 64,500 members.

== Overview ==
The Borneo Basel Self Established Church was founded in 1925. Though following in the tradition of the Basel Mission, it was an independent institution. At the foundation of the Malaysian state in 1963, the church changed its name to "Basel Christian Church of Malaysia". By the end of the 1960s, the church followed the example of its sister church in Hong Kong and joined the Lutheran World Federation (LWF).

By the end of the 1970s, the BCCM focused its mission among the native population of Sabah. The missionary work, which the BCCM began to do independently and in different places in Sabah, led to the establishment of local Malay-speaking congregations. This native branch of BCCM congregations is organised in a separate synod, which is part of the overall synod of the BCCM. Its name is BCCM - Bahasa Malaysia (BCCM-BM); it represents 22,000 congregation members and is mainly present in central and west Sabah. In many places, the dependency on the Chinese-speaking congregations is still considerable and is seen as a burden by the Chinese. The BCCM-BM has six congregation districts with a total of 90 congregations (including Kuala Lumpur).

The current bishop (since 2024) of the Basel Christian Church of Malaysia is Rev. Dr. Wong Fui Kong and the current president is Mr. Fung Yin Khun.

== History ==
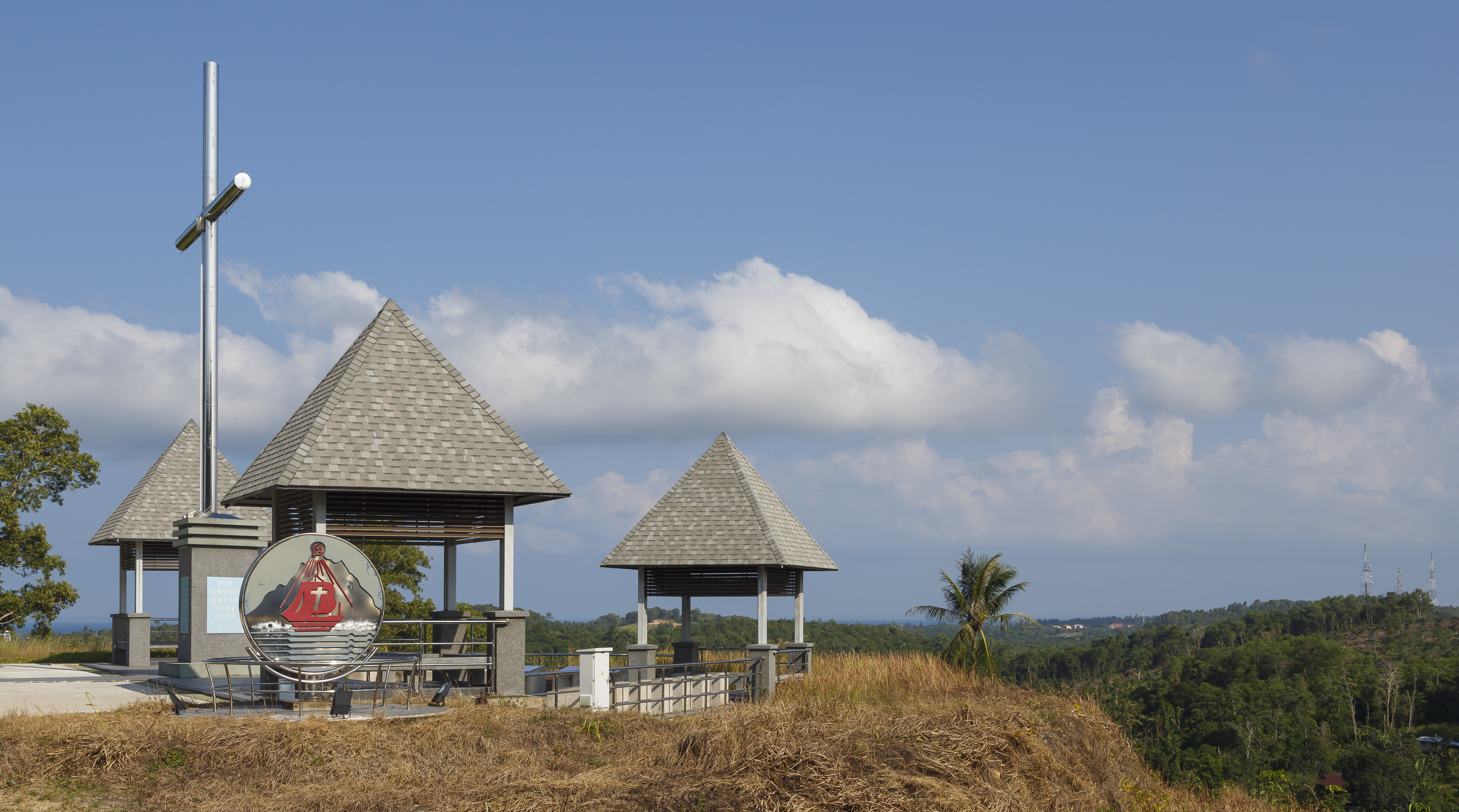
The Cross on the hill of Lau San Church

The Basel Missionary Society Mission sent its missionaries to Africa, and later to India in 1833. In 1846, missionaries were also sent to China. The first two missionaries to Mainland China and Hong Kong were Rev. Theodore Hamberg and Rev. Rudolph Lechler. They worked especially among the Hakka linguistic tribe in Guangdong Province and Hong Kong. After many years about 200 congregations and more than 100 schools were built up. The church membership was about twenty thousand.

In the aftermath of the failed Taiping Rebellion in China, Hakka speaking Christians affiliated with the Basel Mission were viewed with suspicion by the Qing government as the leader of the rebellion, Hong Xiuquan, was himself a Hakka who claimed to be a Christian. This resulted in an increase in the number of Hakka-speaking refugees travelling from China into the Southeast Asian region.

The British North Borneo Company established a settlement in North Borneo in December 1882, when an initial group of 100 Hakka Chinese Christian laborers from mainland China landed at Kudat, a town in the northern part of North Borneo. Many groups followed within the next few years. In this new land, the Hakka immigrants worked hard on their land for six days and rested only on Sundays. On Sundays, they gathered in one of their own homes for worship. A large number of them located on the west coast to work on railway construction and new towns with a majority of Chinese were set up along the railway line. The Hakka Christians who came along with the other immigrants set up their own worship places on the west coast and other parts of Sabah. The British North Borneo Company sent recruiting agents to Hong Kong to recruit these labourers. Lechler supported the scheme and Hakka Christians from the Basel Mission and the Basel-established Chongzhen Church (Tsung-Tsin Church or 崇真會) were recruited.

The first group of settlers consisted of ten families who arrived in Kudat and proceeded to found a settlement in Lausan. Worship meetings were held on Sundays in one of the houses until the first attap roofed church building was built in the plantation of Lo Tai Hong in 1886. This became known as the Lausan Church and was the first Basel congregation organised in the territory.

== Self-establishment ==
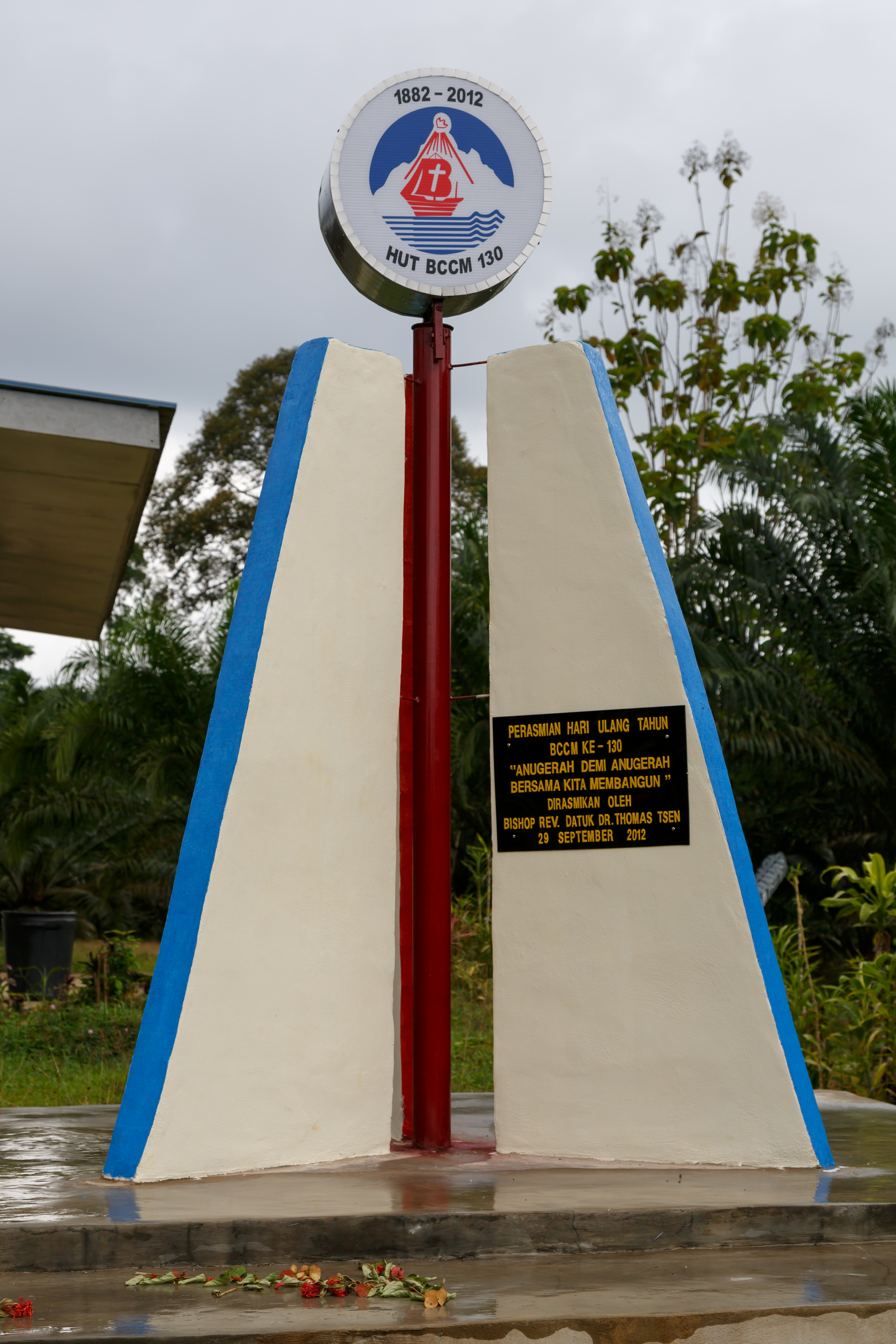
Basel Church Memorial in Telupid, Sabah

The Hakka Christians set up their own churches and Chinese schools wherever a few families were gathered together. In 1925, during the first synod in Kudat, Rev. Schule, a Basel Mission representative, proposed that the church should immediately practise self-reliance, so that the various gifts in the church could be channelled to administer and develop the church. The church authority felt then that it was not the time yet, but accepted Schule's proposal and became a self-governing, self-supporting, and self-propagating church.

On 7 July 1937, Japan officially declared war on China and the Second Sino-Japanese War began. In 1941, Japan invaded South East Asia and from 1942 to 1945, British Malaya and British Borneo were occupied by the Japanese army. During that time, 70 members of the church were murdered by the Japanese, and several hundred more died from indirect causes. Buildings were destroyed and believers scattered from their homes.

In 1945, the Emperor of Japan surrendered to the Allied Forces and withdrew from Malaya and British Borneo. The war had left much devastation and believers were left to reconstruct and rebuild their homes and settlements. At that time, the Lutheran World Federation (LWF) extended aid to the church in the forms of finances and manpower including teachers. This would become one of the factors that caused the church to join the LWF as one of its members.

== Mission zeal ==
Active outreach towards the Bumiputra began in 1974, when two members from the congregation at Inanam, Chong Yun Leong and Paul Chung, first launched the campaign of "Preaching the Gospel to the Natives". This ministry was first sponsored by the congregation at Inanam. In June 1975, Gasin Guntidong, a young Kadazandusun, was engaged to do surveys in the villages and mission work was started in the Inanam and Menggatal areas. In July 1975, the first Sunday service in Bahasa Malaysia was conducted at the old BCCM Inanam church building with an attendance of 16 people. The outreach was stepped up and many villages such as Kg. Kokol, Kg. Piniang, Kg. Binaung and Kg. Mansiang were reached. In July 1976, the first Bumiputra chapel was built at Kampung Piniang. The first baptism service for the Kadazan-Dusuns was held on Ascension Day of 1976 and 76 people were baptized.

The mission among the Bumiputra expanded quickly. It was taken over jointly by the Kota Kinabalu parish and the Central Council. Outreach was extended to the Muruts in Pensiangan District in 1978, after a Christian working in Pensiangan saw that thousands of Muruts were living without the gospel. In 1978, Richard Angang, a half-Murut pastor, was posted to Sapulut with his family and a young Bible school graduate was sent to join him. By 1993, there were a total of 20 young Bumiputra pastors, and 11,000 Bumiputra members worshipping in 80 churches, chapels and gathering places since BCCM first began its cross-cultural mission about three decades earlier. As more and more Bumiputra congregations and places of worship were set up, the BCCM felt the constraints of manpower in the field and leadership for the newly established congregations.

By this time, the BCCM Central Mission Committee decided to establish a center to provide basic training in Bible knowledge and leadership for the Bumiputra in Bahasa Malaysia.

== Bible Training Centre ==
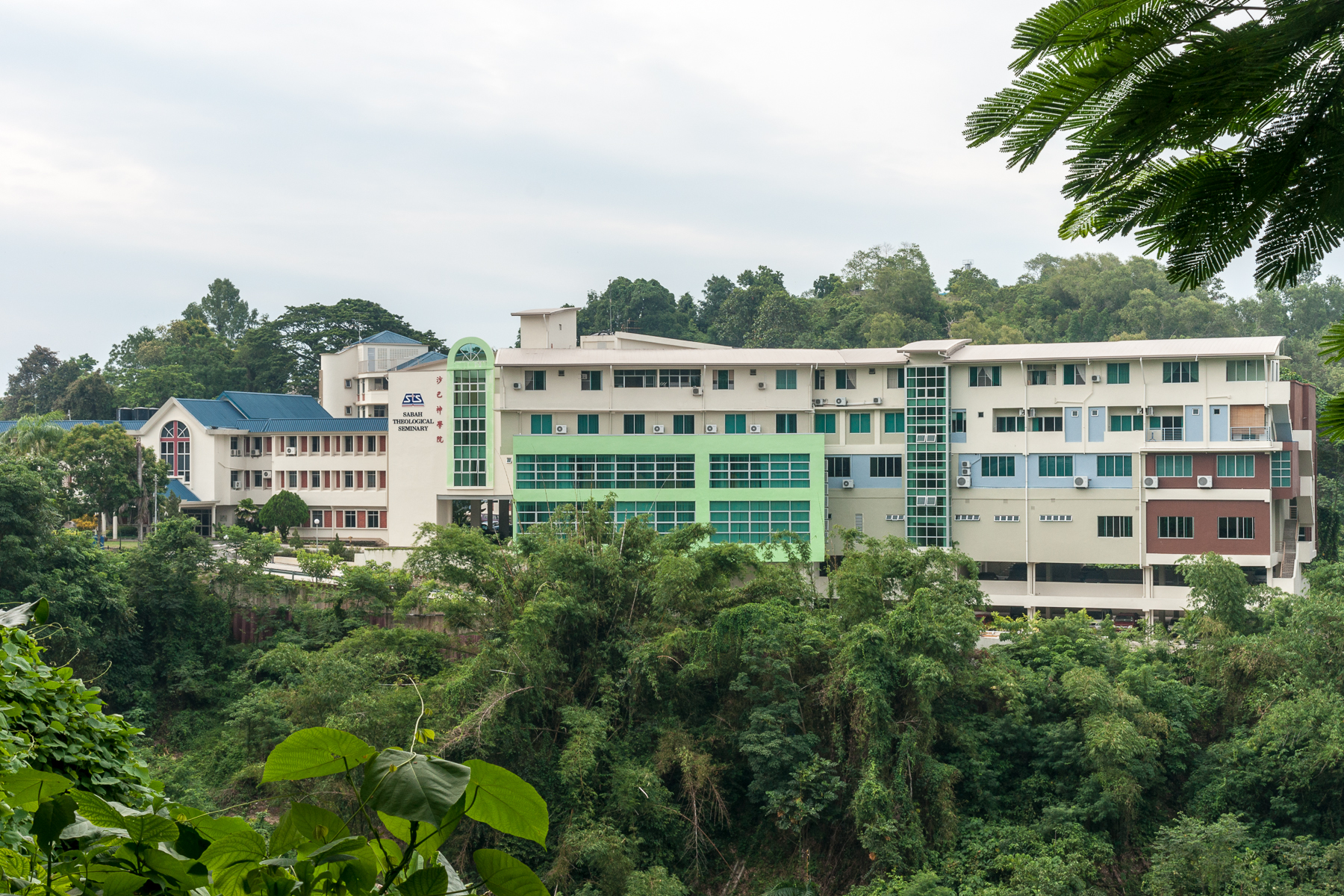
Sabah Theological Seminary

In 1980, a Bible Training Center in Kota Kinabalu (Pusat Latihan Alkitab Kota Kinabalu or PLAKK) was set up at BCCM Kota Kinabalu's old church building on Signal Hill. Two old buildings of the Lok Yuk Secondary School were converted into classrooms, hostels, a dining hall, and teachers' quarters. Initially the Bible Training Center provided one year of training with an initial admission of ten students supervised by two full-time teachers, the Rev. Datuk Thomas Tsen and the Rev. Daniel Taie. The church proposed upgrading the Bible Training Center to a full seminary known today as the Sabah Theological Seminary. This became the first seminary in Malaysia to use Bahasa Malaysia as the medium of instruction.

== Structure and organisation ==
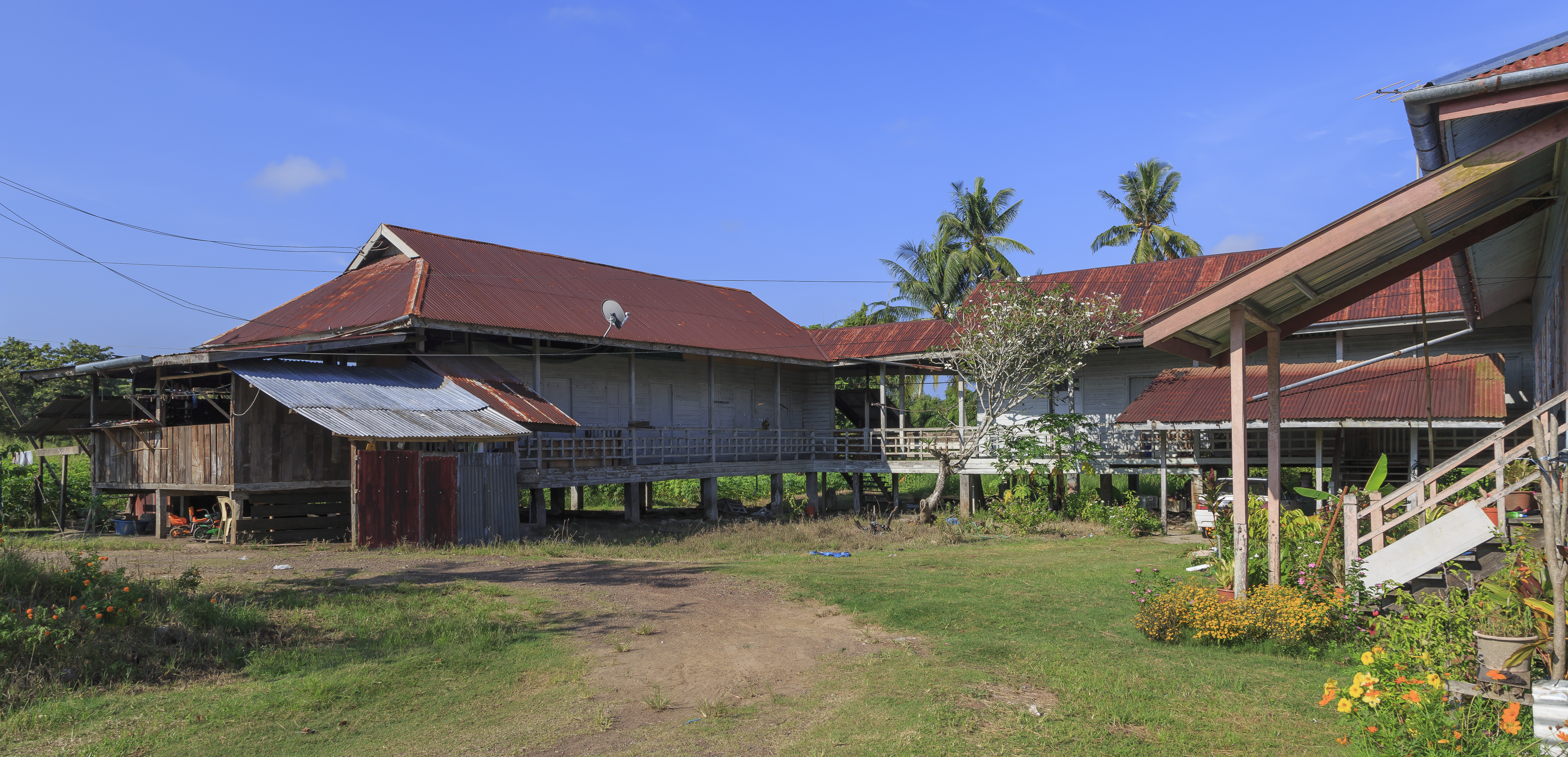
The former missionary in Sikuati; operated by Basel Church and PCS

After the establishment of the Lausan Church, other congregations were organised in places and settlements including Kudat (1901), Papar (1903), Jesselton (1905), Sandakan (1907), Beaufort (1909), Tenom (1911) and Tawau (1913). The Basel Christians also pioneered formal Chinese language education in the territory when the first Chinese school was established in Kudat in 1886.

The first synod of the Basel churches in North Borneo was convened in Kudat in 1925 and following a challenge from the representative of the Basel Mission to become self-reliant, organised themselves as the Borneo Self-Governing Basel Church under the leadership of the Rev. Wong Thien Nyuk. The church was first called the Basel Church. After independence in 1925, it was named the Borneo Basel Self-Established Church. Meanwhile, the Basel Church in Guangdong and Hong Kong adopted a new name, Tsung Tsin Church, in 1924. The church did not follow suit because of its roots and origin.

In 1963, Sabah was freed from the British colonial rule, and became a state within the Federation of Malaysia. The church was then renamed The Basel Christian Church of Malaysia. As early as the 1950s, the BCCM was involved directly and indirectly in the Basel Mission's cross-cultural mission to the Rungus people in Kudat. In 1967, the BCCM took over Dr G Christopher Willis’ mission work among the native people living along the Labuk River in Murok, Sandakan. The Basel Christian Church of Malaysia became an official member of the Lutheran World Federation in 1973.

Today the BCCM has a total of 39 Chinese congregations, 7 English congregations, and 80 Bahasa Malaysia congregations. Three secondary schools, fourteen primary schools, and more than fourteen kindergartens have been set up in the major towns in Sabah.

Since 1975, BCCM has experienced tremendous growth in its Bumiputra membership. In 2002, the BCCM-BM had around 18,000 church members in six parishes, Paroki Tuaran (15 congregations), Paroki Kota Kinabalu (10 congregations), Paroki Sandakan (12 congregations), Paroki Tawau (3 congregations), Paroki Pedalaman I (13 congregations), Paroki Pedalaman II (7 congregations). Sunway Kuala Lumpur and Kudat are two new congregations established in 2000 and 2001 respectively to cater the needs of church members of BCCM-BM who have migrated and work there respectively. There were 46 full-time pastors serving in BCCM-BM in 2002. In addition, there were four part-time pastors and eight theological students who were studying at the Sabah Theological Seminary.

== Beliefs and practices ==
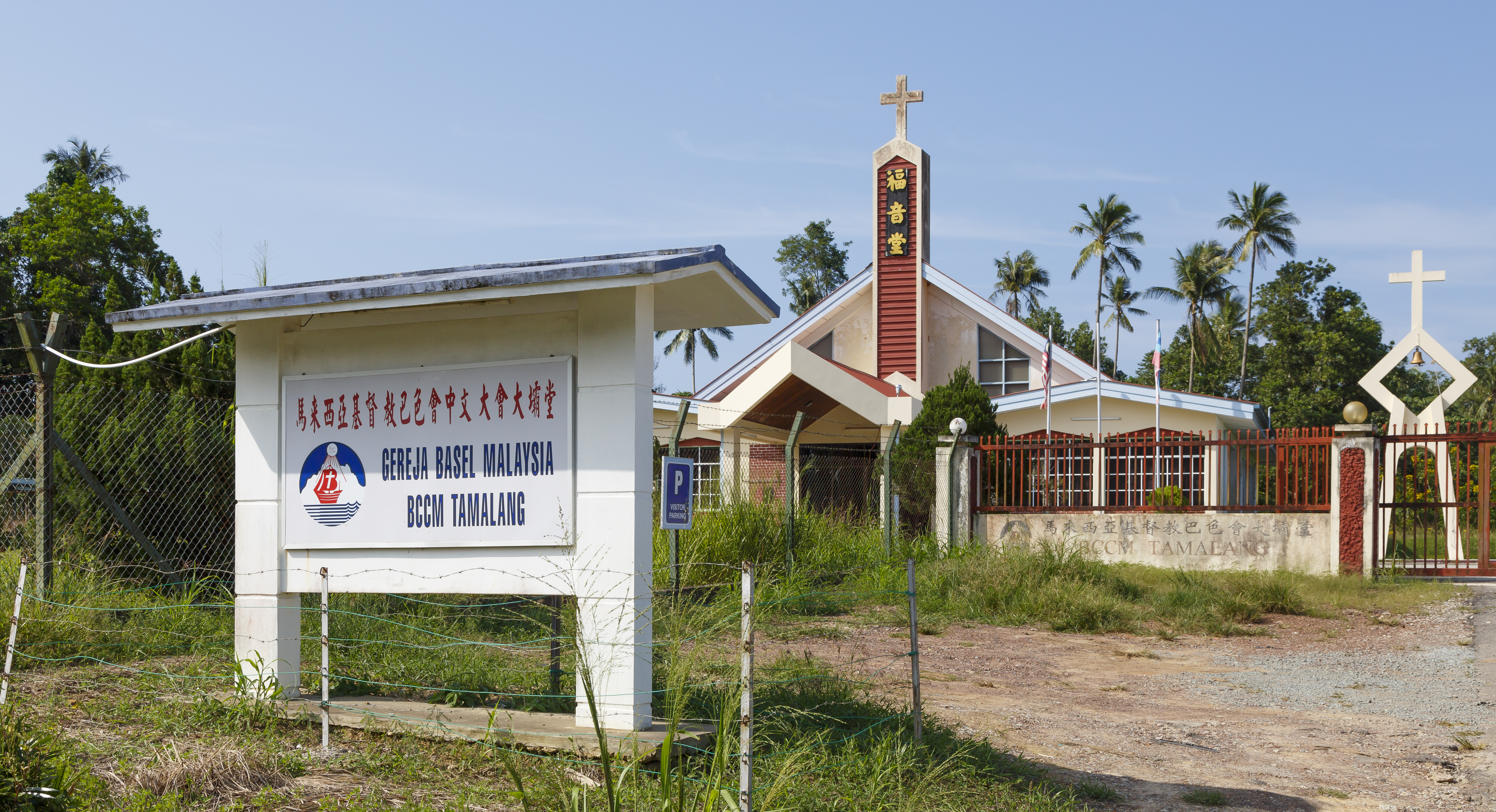
Basel Christian Church Malaysia (BCCM) Tamalang, Kudat, Sabah

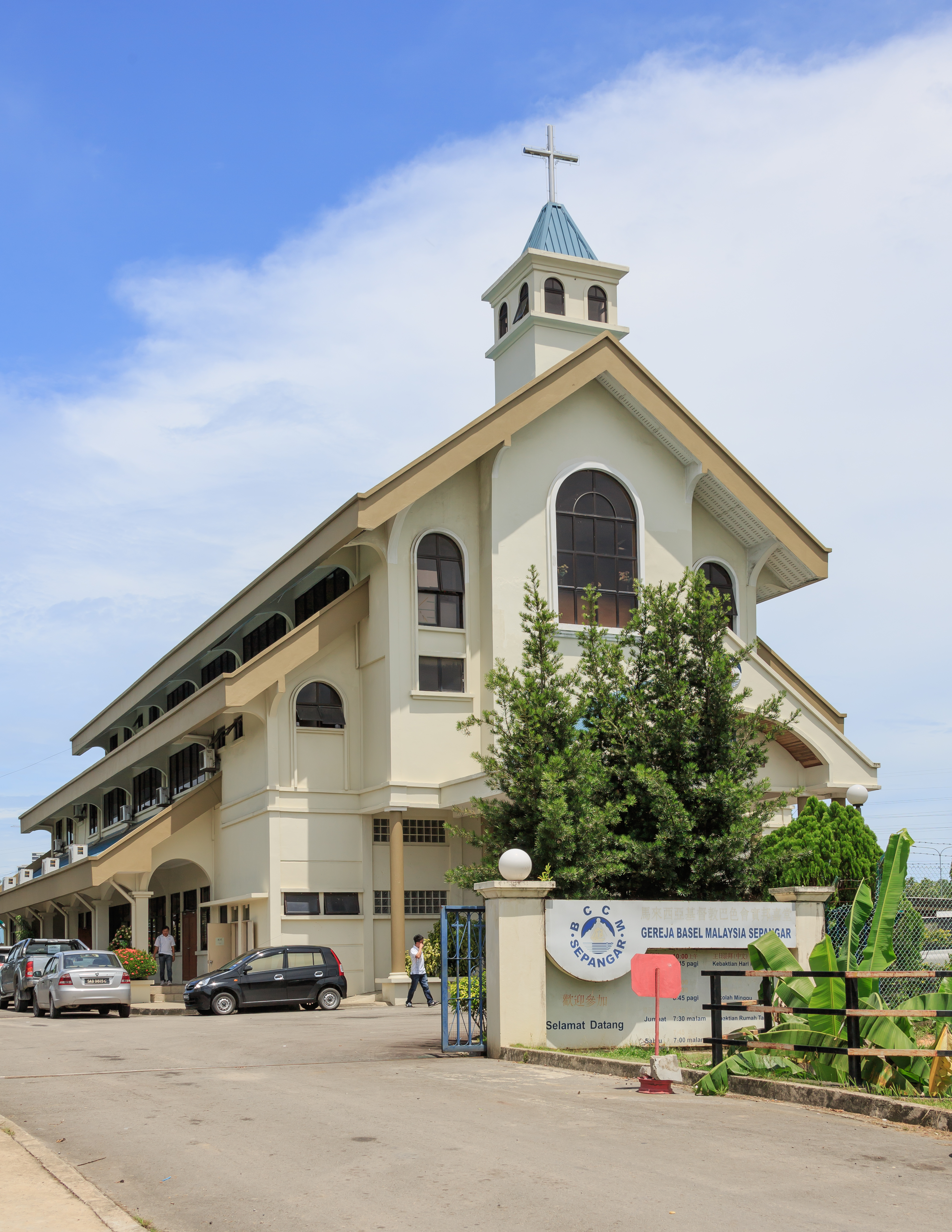
Basel Church in Sepanggar

=== Mission statement ===
The BCCM mission statement is taken from the Bible, Matthew Chapter 5:14-16, where Jesus said, "You are the light of the world. A city on a hill cannot be hidden. Neither do people light a lamp and put it under a bowl. Instead they put it on its stand, and it gives light to everyone in the house. In the same way, let your light shine before men, that they may see your good deeds and praise your Father in heaven."

=== BCCM logo ===
==== Boat: Historical background ====
Our ancestors travelled far from China to Sabah and established Basel Church. Though passing through rough seas, with Jesus as the boatman, they got through safely.

==== Mount Kinabalu: Mission ====
BCCM believes that, Under the leadership of the Holy Spirit, although the path is difficult, dangerous and with a lot of temptation, all will be overcome and the gospel shall be spread.

==== Circle ====
BCCM believes that the circles symbolises Unity in the love of the Lord. All Christians are encircled in the love of God disregarding race, colour, language and customs. The circle also represents the length, breadth, height and depth of the love of God.

==== Blue ====
Signifies the long history and the infiniteness, it also represents meekness and peace.

==== Red ====
Signifies the fire of the Holy Spirit, full of love, faith, zeal, wisdom, boldly marching forth.

== Christian mission schools and kindergartens ==
Christian mission schools were set up in Sabah by various Christian missionary organisations during the late 1800s and the early 1900s.

According to a census report, there were eight mission schools in Sabah (then known as British North Borneo) in 1910, but the number increased to 45 in 1934. Of these, 18 were operated by the Basel Christian Church, 20 by the Roman Catholic Mission, and 7 by the Anglican Church. By 2009, there were approximately 425 Christian mission schools throughout Malaysia.

These schools are open to children of all races and religions.

To date, the Basel Christian Church of Malaysia has established a total of 29 schools and kindergartens as follows:

=== Chinese primary schools ===
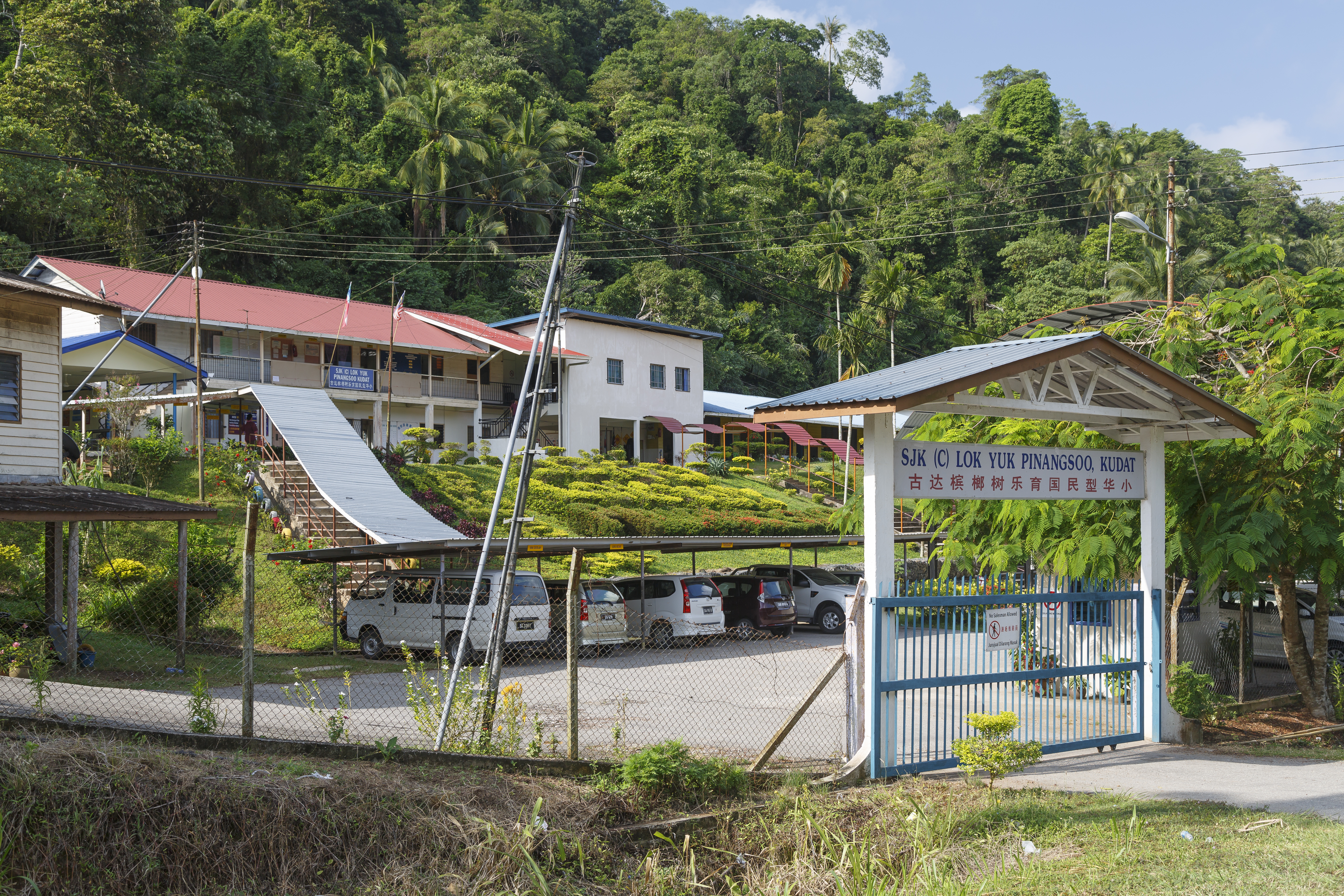
SJK (C) Lok Yuk Pinangsoo

- SJK(C) Lok Yuk Likas, Kota Kinabalu
- SJK(C) Lok Yuk Menggatal, Kota Kinabalu
- SJK(C) Anglo Chinese, Papar
- SJK(C) Lok Yuk Pinangsoo, Kudat
- SJK(C) Lok Yuk Batu 1, Kudat

=== Bahasa medium primary schools (formerly English) ===
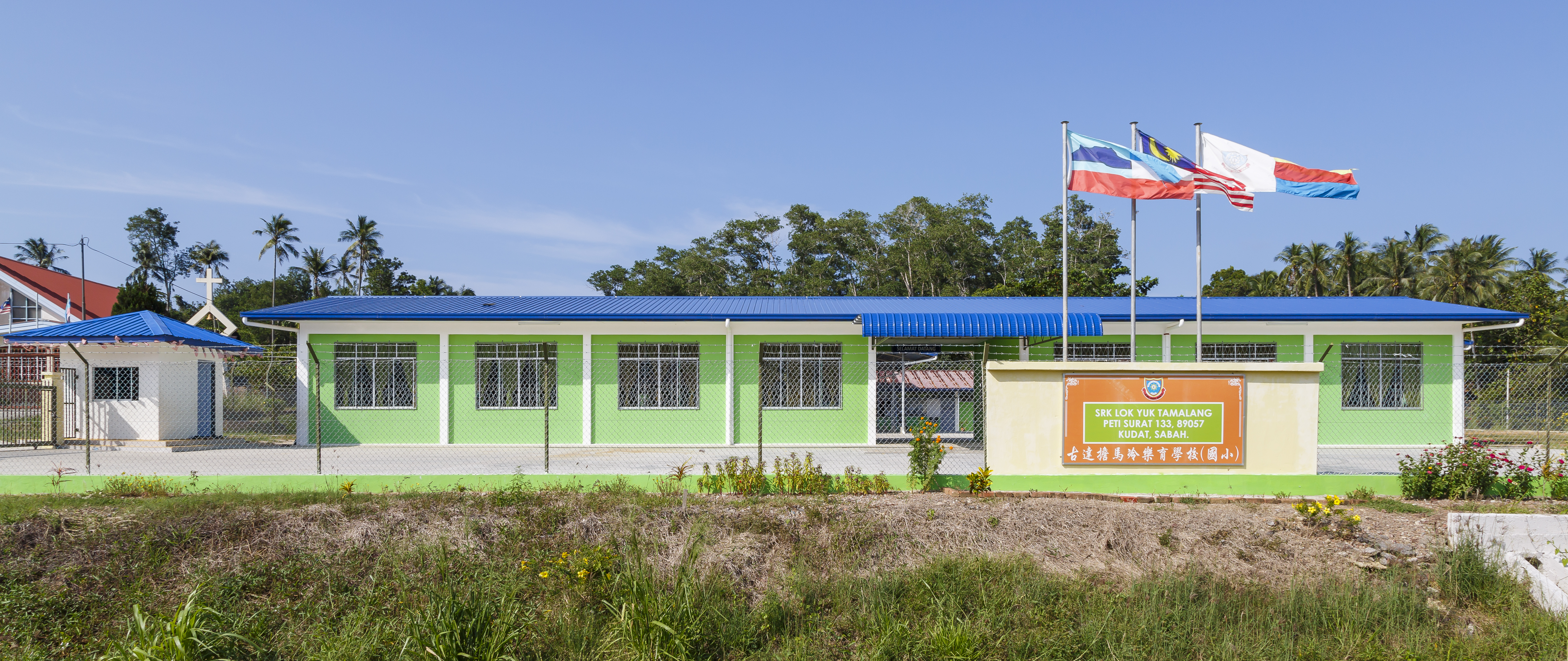
SK Yok Luk Tamalang

- SK Sung Siew, Sandakan;
- SK Lok Yuk Inanam, Kota Kinabalu;
- SK Lok Yuk Likas, Kota Kinabalu;
- SK Lok Yuk Telipok, Kota Kinabalu;
- SK Lok Yuk Batu 1, Kudat
- SK Lok Yuk Tamalang, Kudat
- SK Lok Yuk Sikuati, Kudat

=== Secondary schools ===
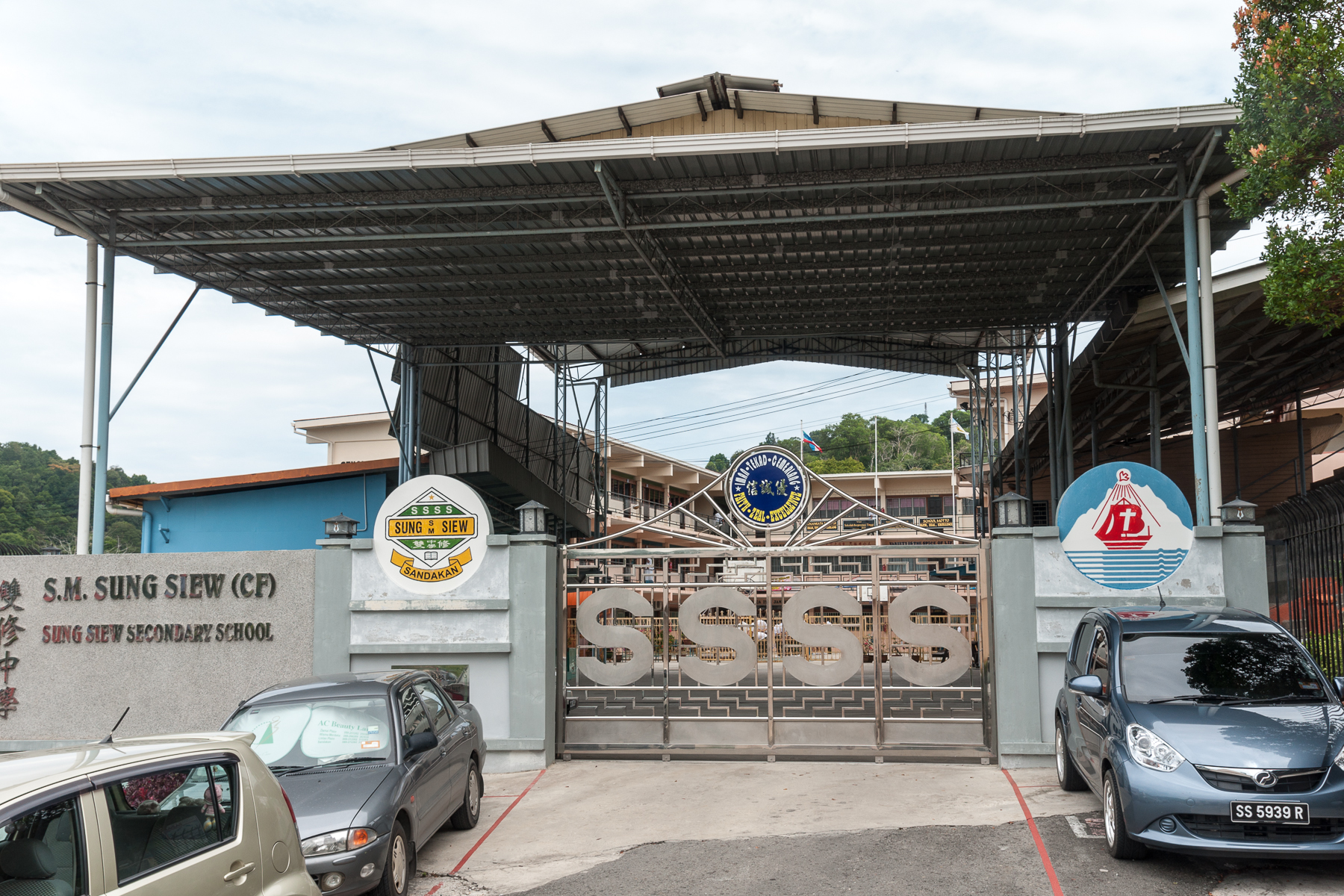
SM Sung Siew, Sandakan

- SM Lok Yuk (CF) Likas, Kota Kinabalu
- SM Sung Siew (CF), Sandakan
- SM Lok Yuk, Kudat

=== Kindergartens ===
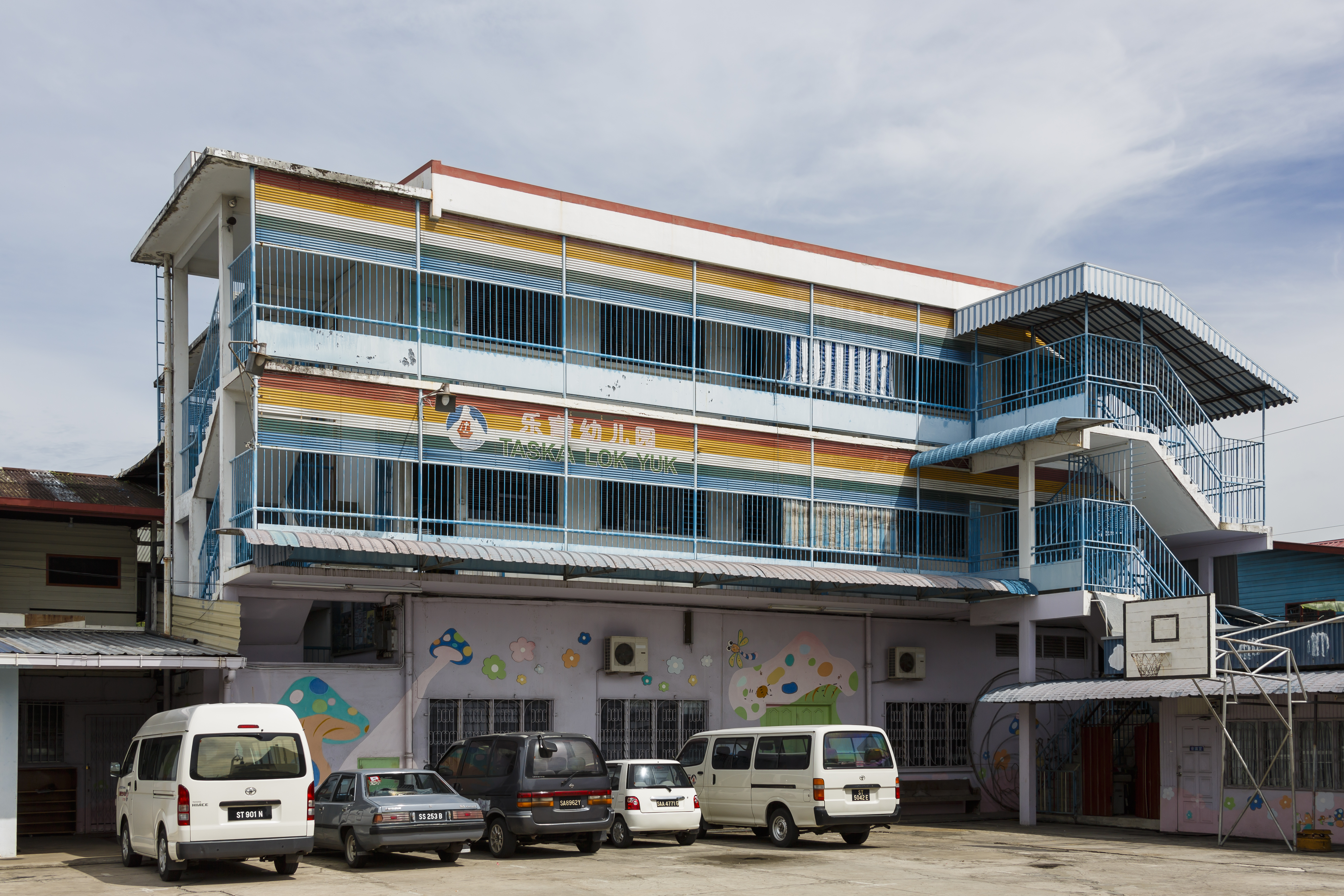
Kindergarten of BCCM Tawau (Gereja Basel Malaysia, Tawau)

- Tadika Lok Yuk, Kota Belud
- Tadika Lok Yuk, Keningau
- Tadika Lok Yuk, Kudat
- Tadika Yuk Yu Inanam, Kota Kinabalu
- Yuk Yu Kindergarten Likas, Kota Kinabalu
- Tadika Lok Yuk Menggatal, Kota Kinabalu
- Tadika Lok Yuk, Papar
- Tadika Yuk Yu Bandar Baru Lido, Penampang
- Tadika Lok Yuk Tamparuli, Tuaran
- Tadika Lok Yuk Petagas, Penampang;
- Yuk Yu Kindergarten, Ranau
- Sung Siew Kindergarten, Sandakan
- Wonder Kids Taska Lok Yuk, Tawau
- Tadika Lok Yuk, Tenom

BCCM Sandakan has also established a day-care centre, named Agape Centre, for disabled children, and BCCM Tawau has established a centre for the deaf and Down syndrome children.

On 26–27 June 2009, 41 representatives from Sabah, Sarawak, and Peninsular Malaysia attended the Conference of Christian Mission Schools in Malaysia at Olympic Hotel, Kuala Lumpur, organized by the Malayan Christian Schools Council and the Mission School Authorities of Sabah and Sarawak under the auspices of the Christian Federation of Malaysia (CFM). The representatives were encouraged, affirmed, and united by their common concern in improving their current high standards of education and providing the best opportunities for the children attending these schools.
