= Humberg =

Humberg may refer to:

- Humberg (Kaiserslautern), a mountain in the Palatinate Forest, Germany
- Humberg Tower, an observation tower on the mountain
- Humberg, a hamlet in the municipality of Gschwend, Baden-Württemberg, Germany
- Humbert, Pas-de-Calais (West Flemish: Humberg), a commune in Hauts-de-France, France

== See also ==
- Hamberg (disambiguation)
- Hamburg (disambiguation)
- Humbug, a deceptive or dishonest person or object
