= Palatinate Forest Nature Park =

Nature park in Rhineland-Palatinate, Germany

Palatinate Forest Nature Park (Naturpark Pfälzerwald)
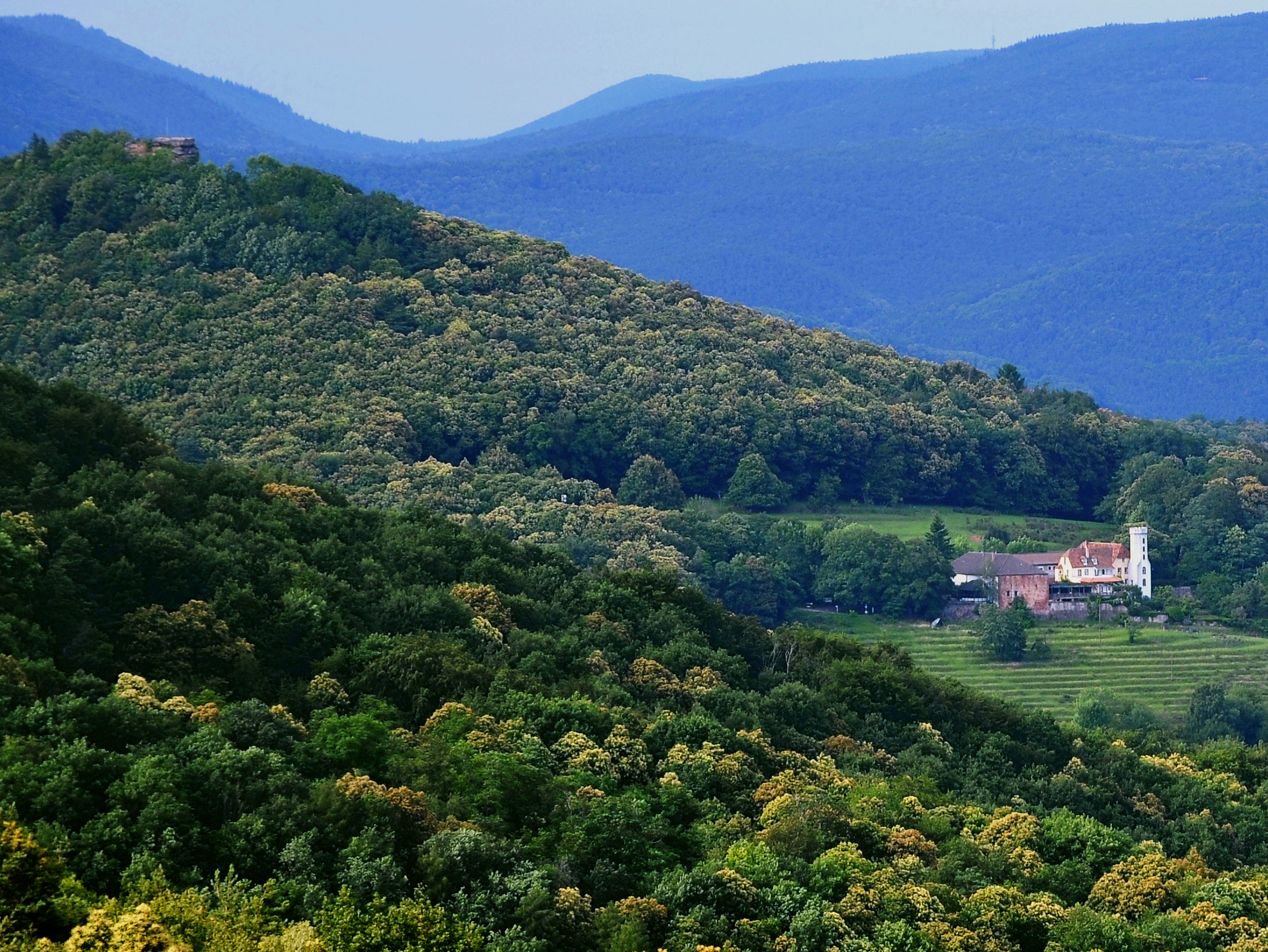

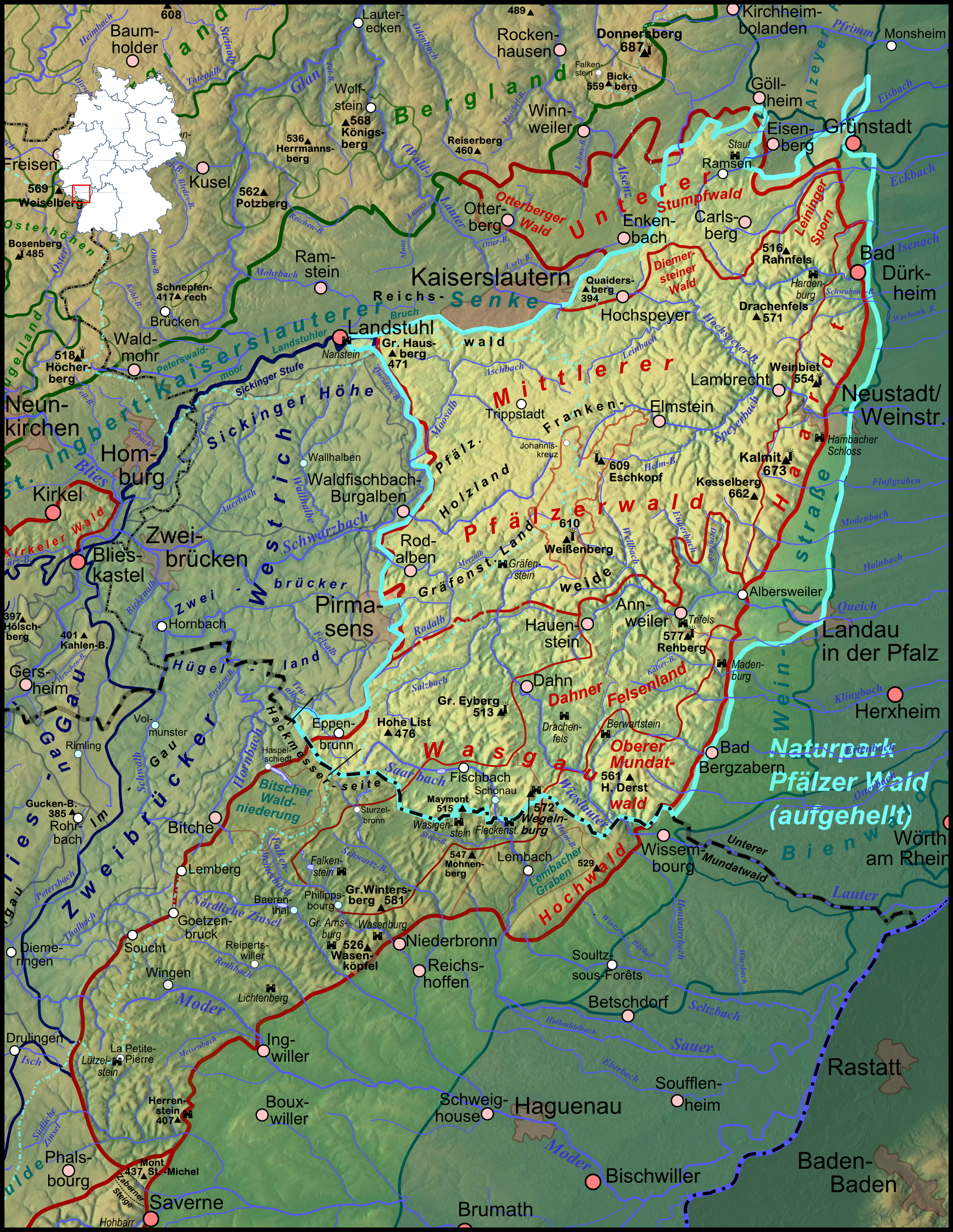
- Blue: Palatinate Forest Nature Park (Germany); Red: The entire Palatinate Forest in both Germany and France
- Coordinates: 49.30°N 7.87°E
- Area: 1,771 km^{2} (684 sq mi)
- Established: 1982

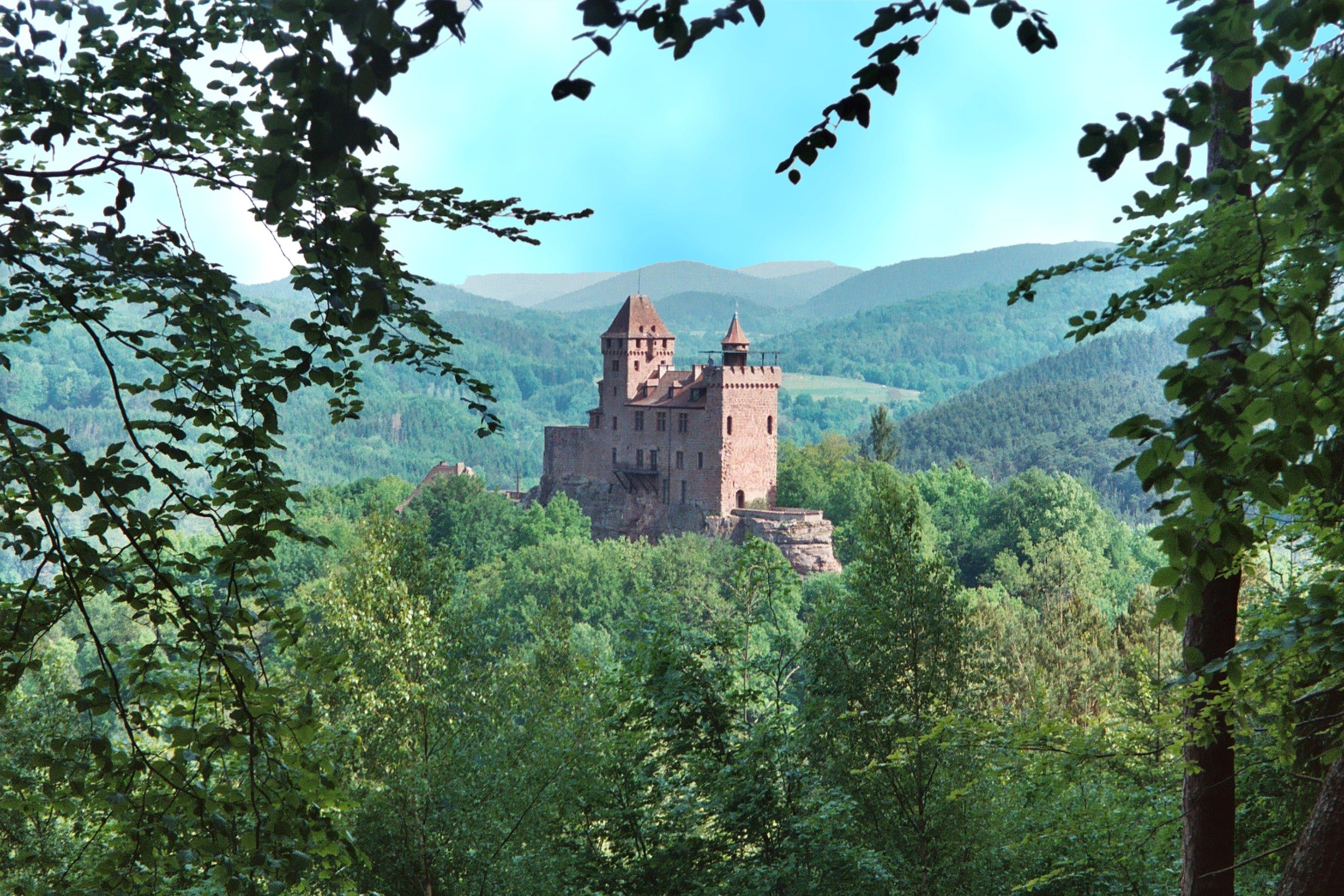
There are many old castles in the Palatinate Forest. Berwartstein castle is one of the more recent.

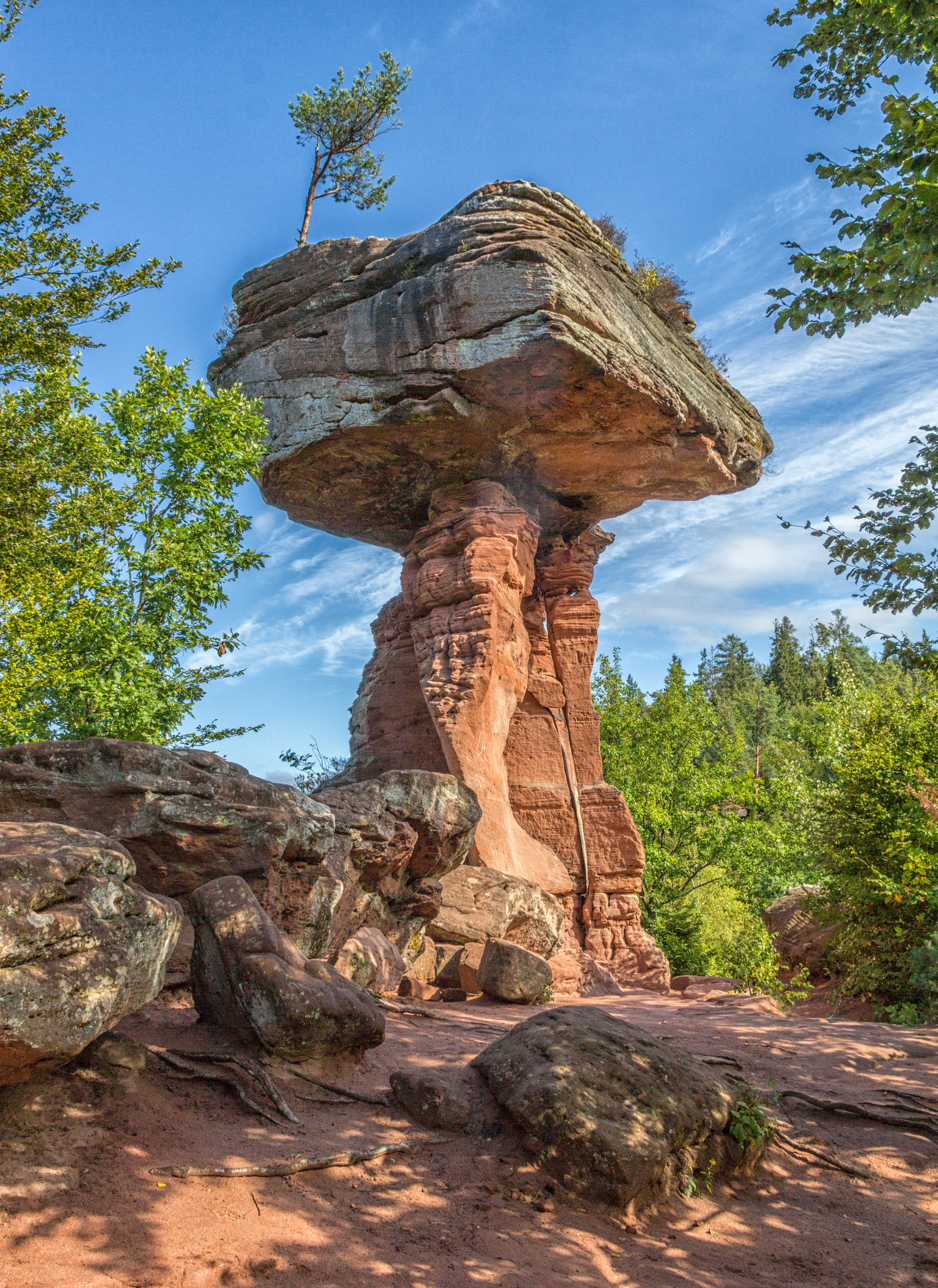
Natural monuments like Teufelstisch (Devil's Table) here, can be experienced throughout the region. They are outcroppings of bunter sandstone, strangely shaped by millennia of slow erosion

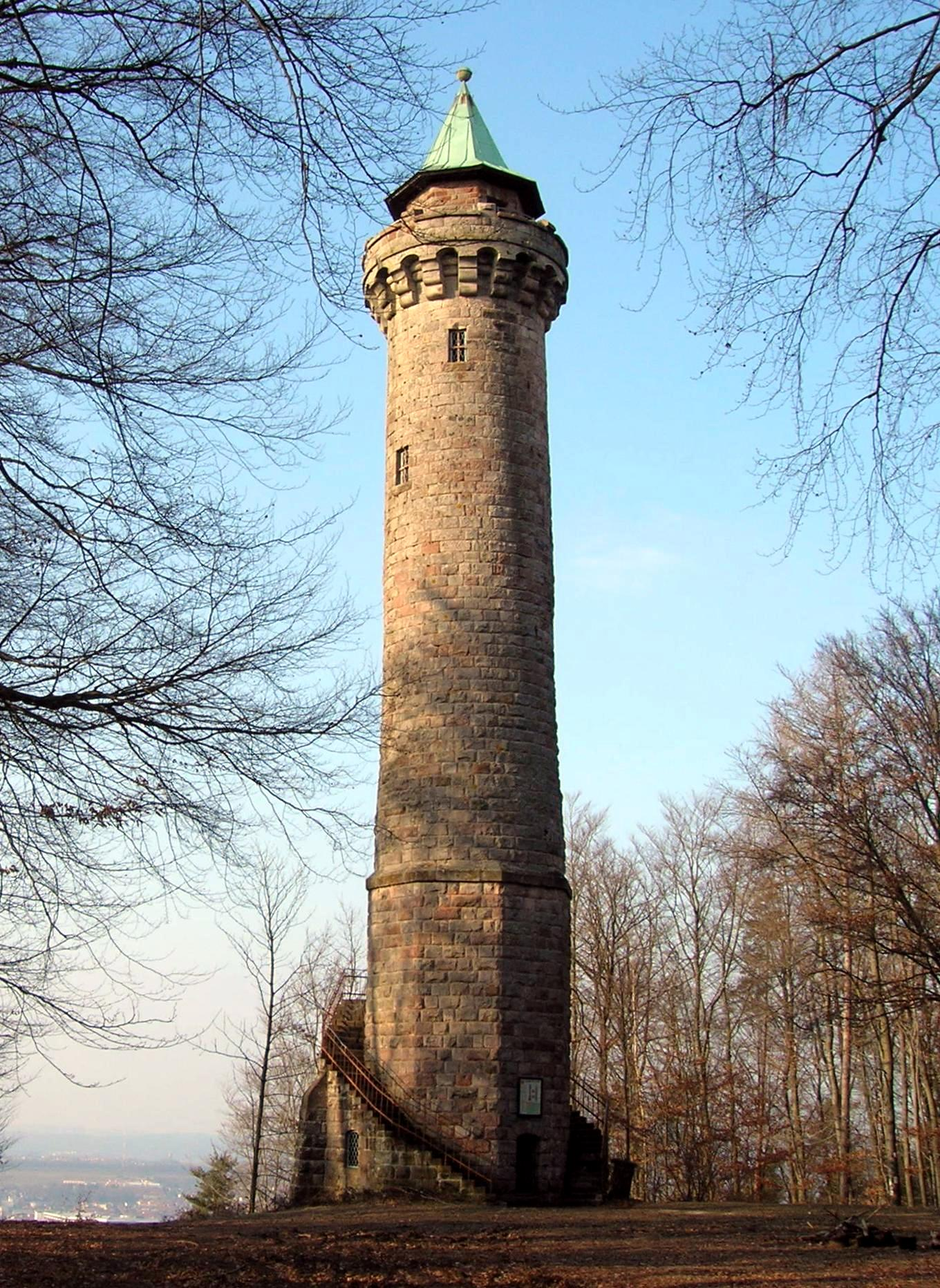
Humberg Tower on the Humberg

The Palatinate Forest Nature Park (German: Naturpark Pfälzerwald) lies in the south of Rhineland-Palatinate in Germany and borders on France. The nature park covers an area of 177,100 hectares (684 sq mi) and some 76% of its area is under the woods of the Palatinate Forest, the largest contiguous forest region in Germany. Together with parts of northern Alsace and Lorraine, it forms the Palatinate Forest-North Vosges Biosphere Reserve and has an impressive Bunter sandstone landscape.

The park is the responsibility of the Naturpark Pfälzerwald e.V. founded on 20 July 1982. The members of the organisation are those districts and towns on whose territory the nature park is located as well as the Palatinate Regional Association and numerous sports clubs and environmental groups. Many business are involved in the work of the nature park which enables the independence of individual functional and regional interests to be guaranteed. The aim of the organisation is to develop in a coherent way the nature park and the biosphere reserve of the same name and to look after and preserve its uniqueness and beauty as well as its pan-regional value as a recreation area. The headquarters of the park association has been based in Lambrecht since 1997.

== Regions ==
The Palatinate Forest Nature Park is divided into 3 regions based on their landscape:

- the Northern Palatinate Forest, bordered in the north by the North Palatine Uplands and extending southwards as far as the line from Kaiserslautern to Bad Dürkheim
- the Middle Palatinate Forest, from the Kaiserslautern - Bad Dürkheim line to Queich and the line from Pirmasens to Landau
- the Southern Palatinate Forest, the so-called Wasgau, which extends from the Queich and a line from Pirmasens to Landau to the French border in the south.

It also includes the former landscape conservation area of the German Wine Route, which runs from the eastern edge of the nature park to the Rhine plain.

== Core zones ==
Based on the current state regulations dated 22 January 2007 the nature park has 16 core zones, which are under special protection:

- Adelsberg near Ludwigswinkel (cross-border with France, c. 191 ha)
- Bobenthaler Knopf near Bobenthal (c. 319 ha)
- Eischkopf near Eußerthal (c. 58 ha)
- Enkenbachtal near Elmstein (c. 235 ha)
- Eulenhald near Waldleiningen (c. 19 ha)
- Großer Berg near Waldleiningen (c. 73 ha)
- Haidbrunnen near Waldleiningen (c. 4 ha)
- Hohe Halde near Eppenbrunn (c. 54 ha)
- Humberg near Kaiserslautern (c. 77 ha)
- Hundsberg near Heltersberg (c. 81 ha)
- Leiterberger Platte near Waldleiningen, (c. 18 ha)
- Mittlerer Gleisberg near Esthal (c. 37 ha)
- Mümmelsköpfe near Ludwigswinkel (c. 51 ha)
- Quellgebiet der Wieslauter (c. 2400 ha)
- Rohrweiher near Ludwigswinkel (c. 22 ha)
- Stabenberg near Neustadt an der Weinstraße (c. 227 ha)

== Gallery ==
Landscapes

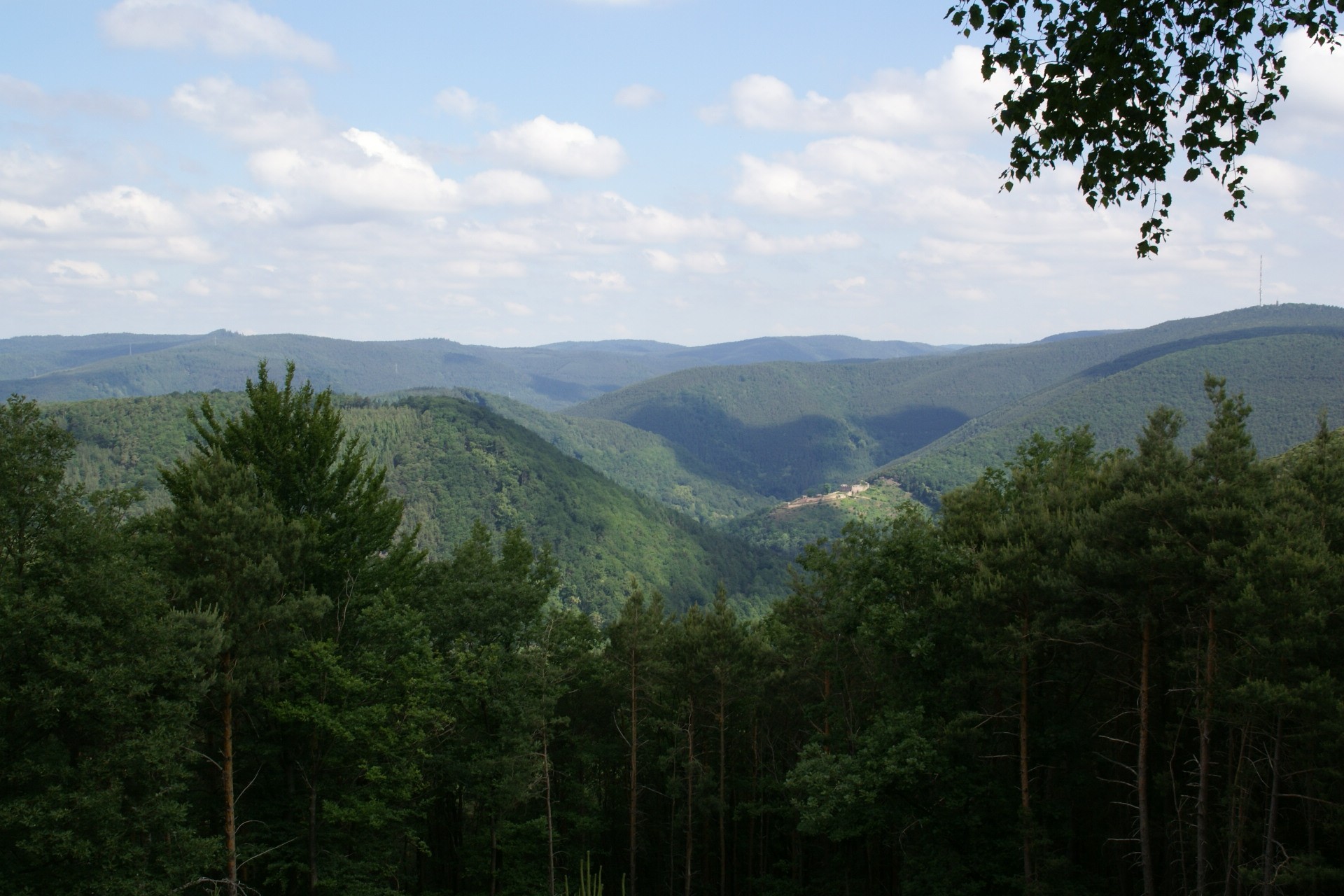

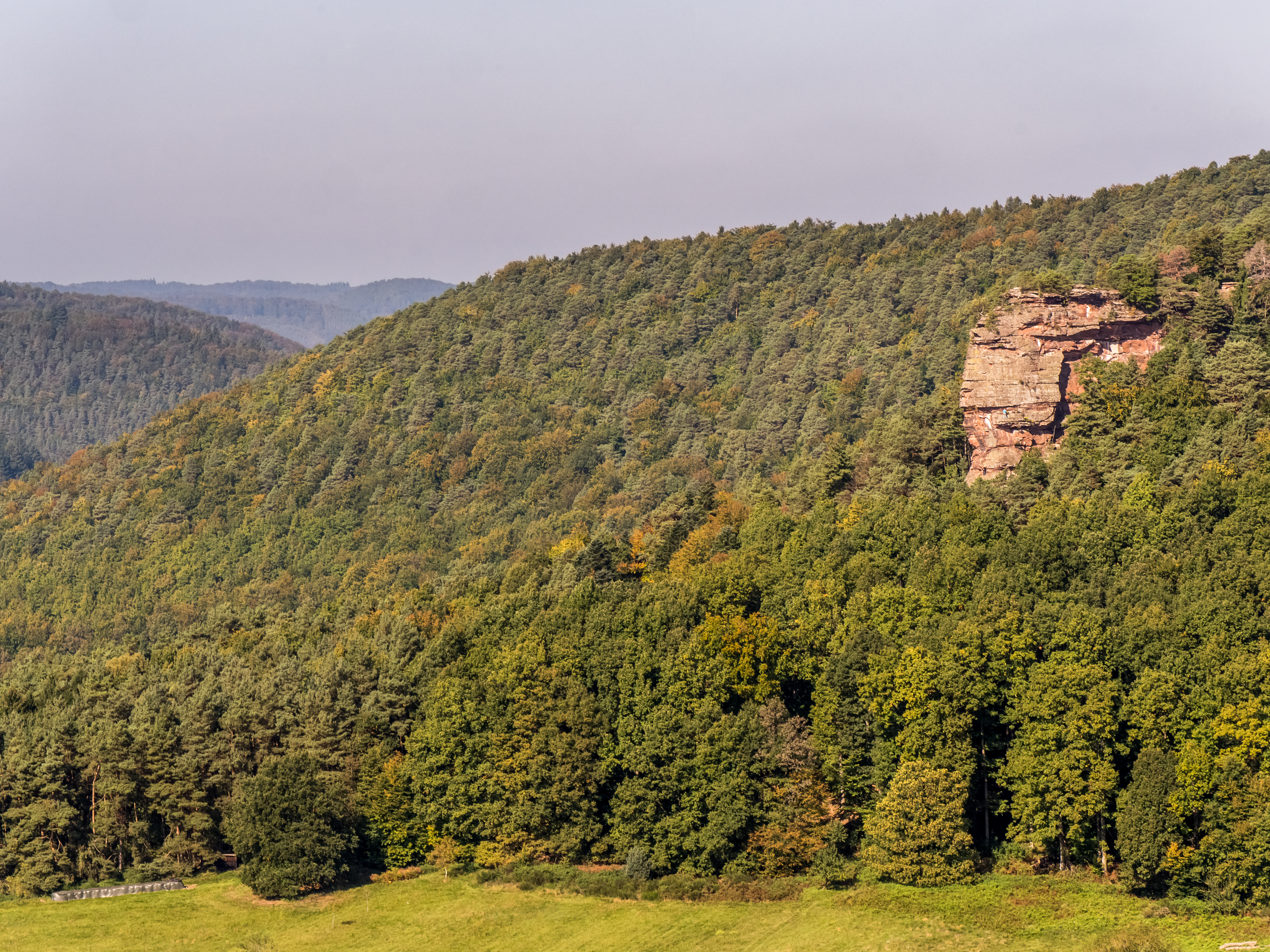

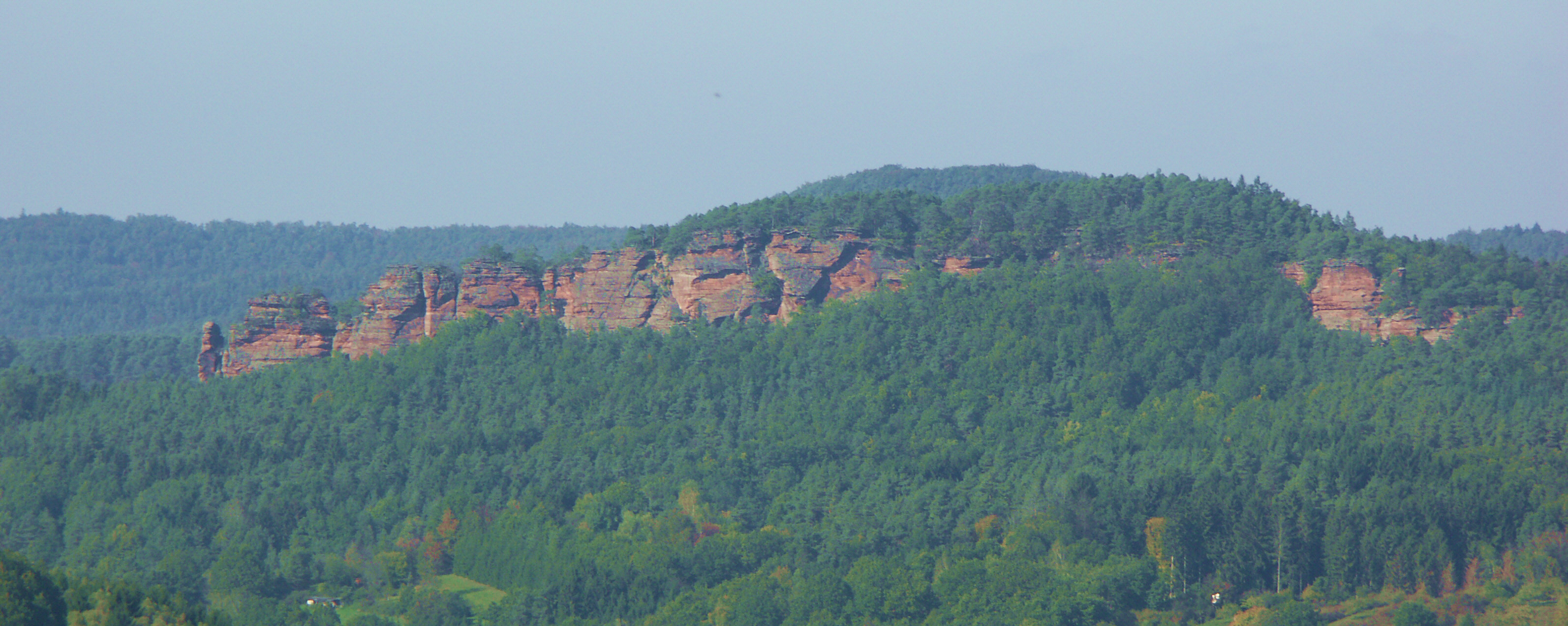

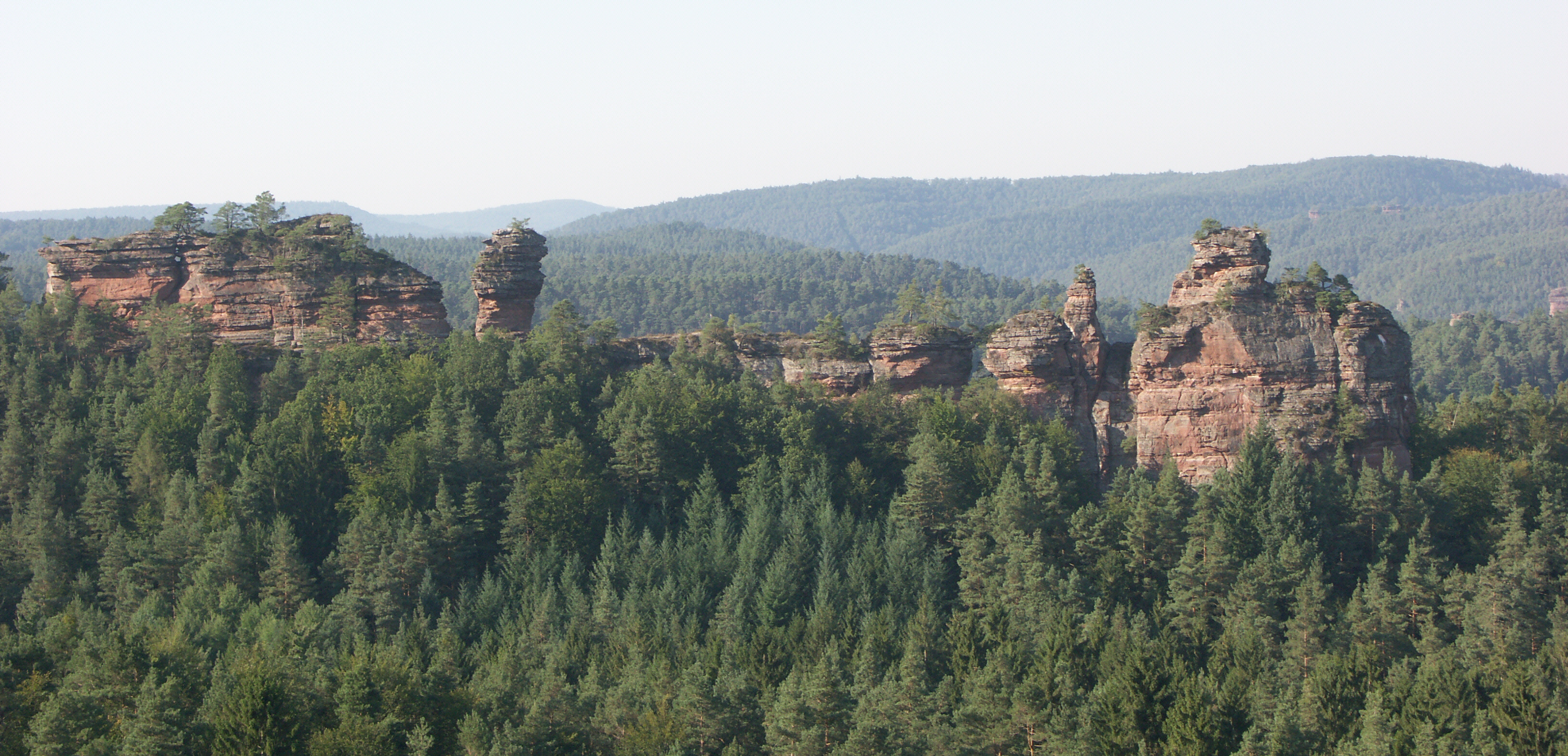

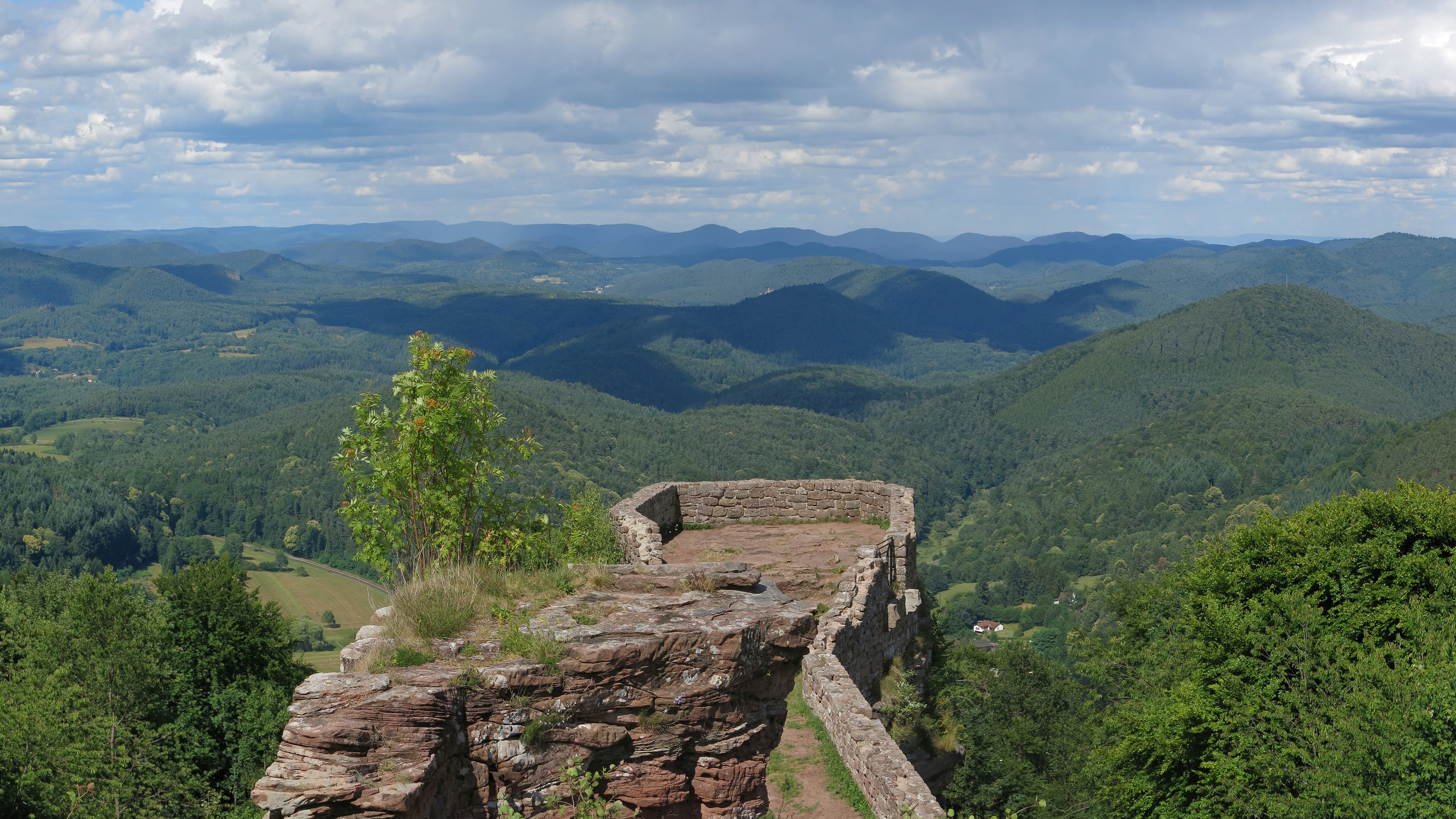

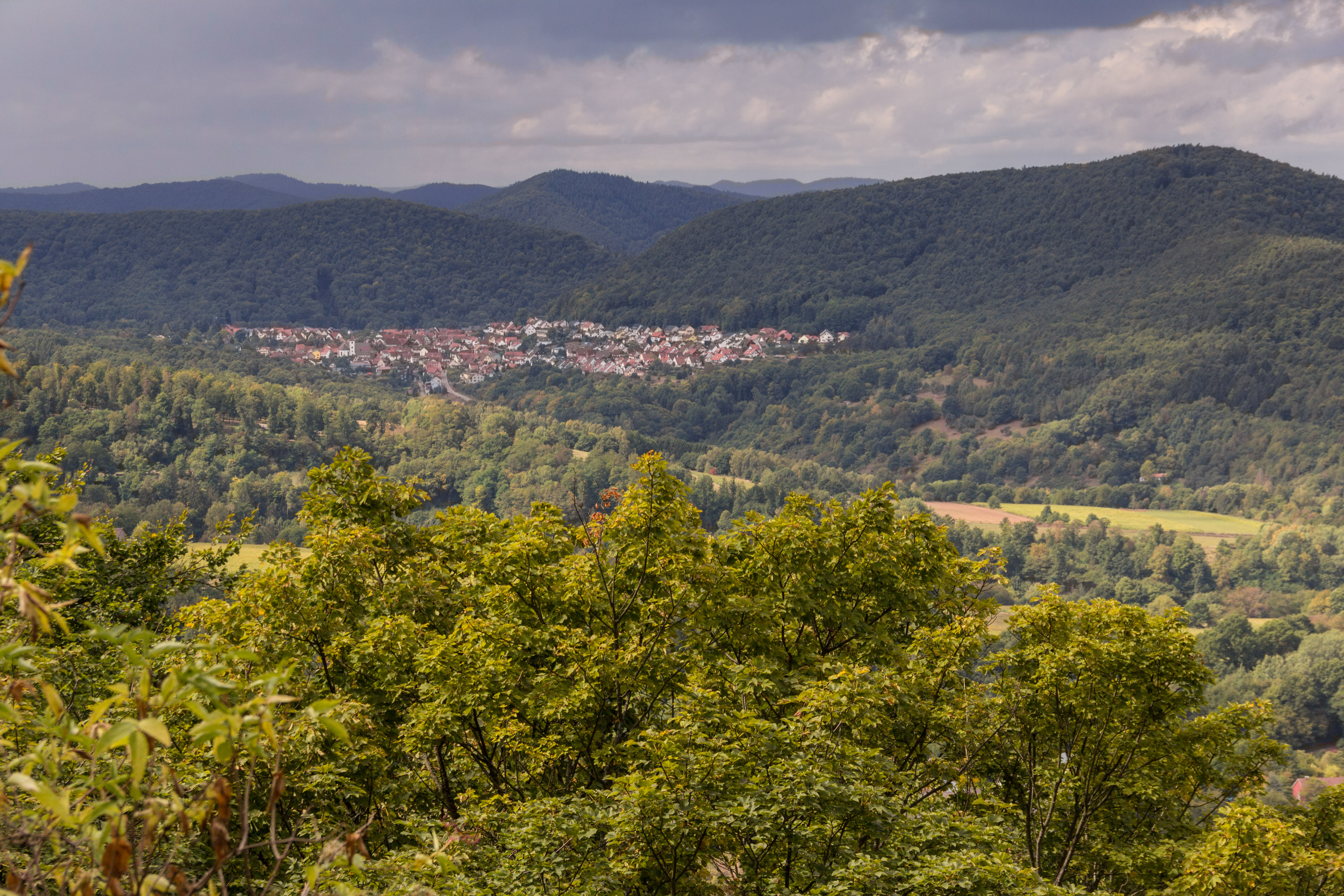

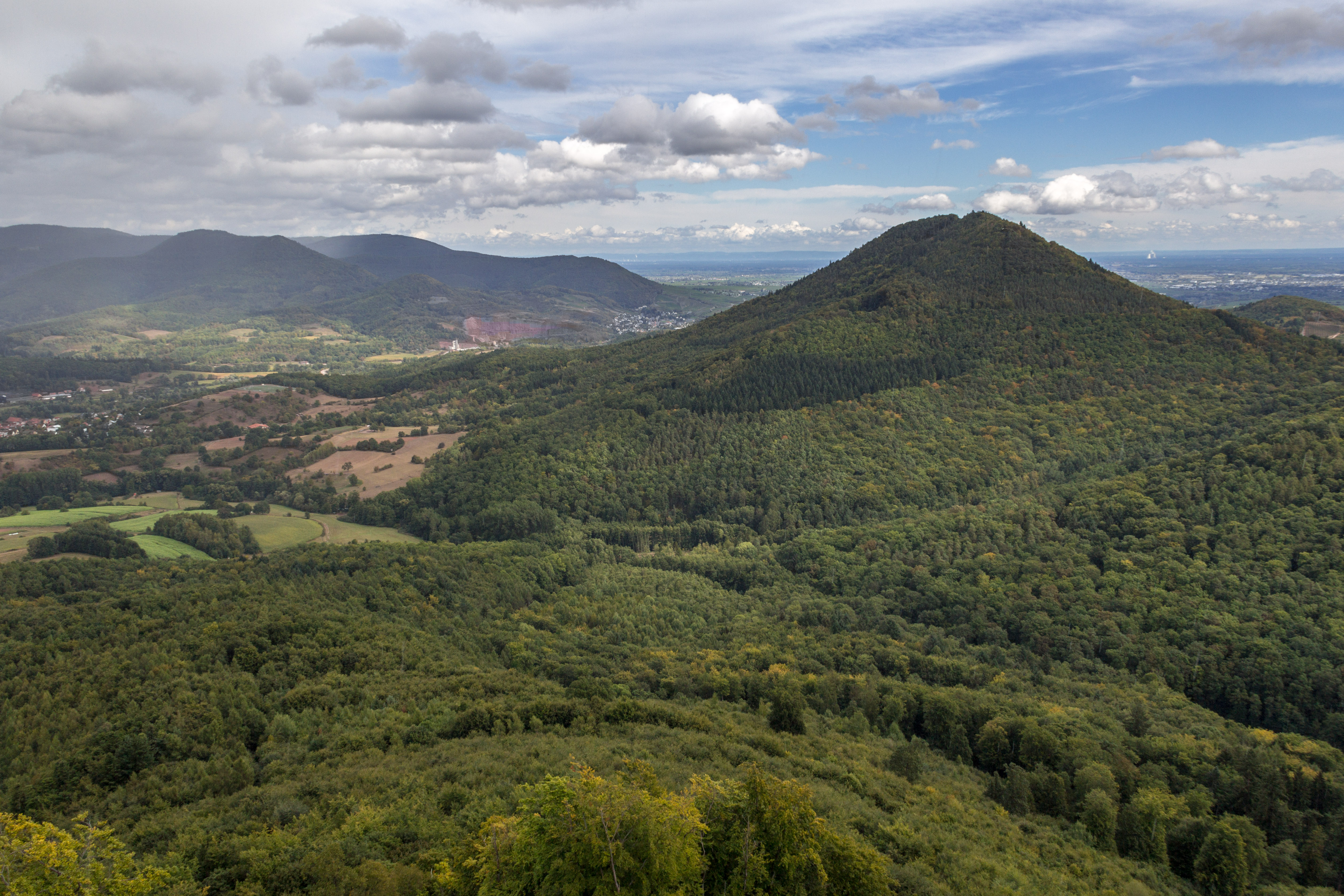

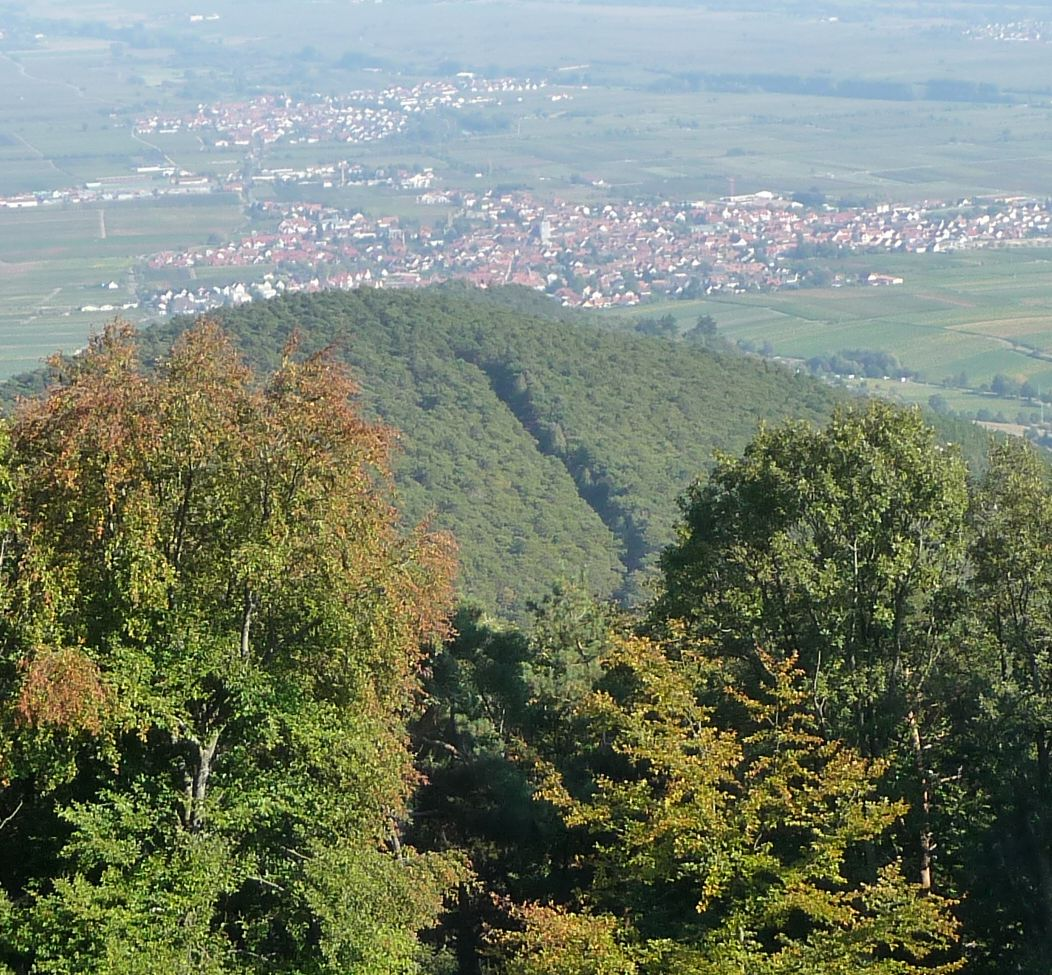

Nature scenes and facilities

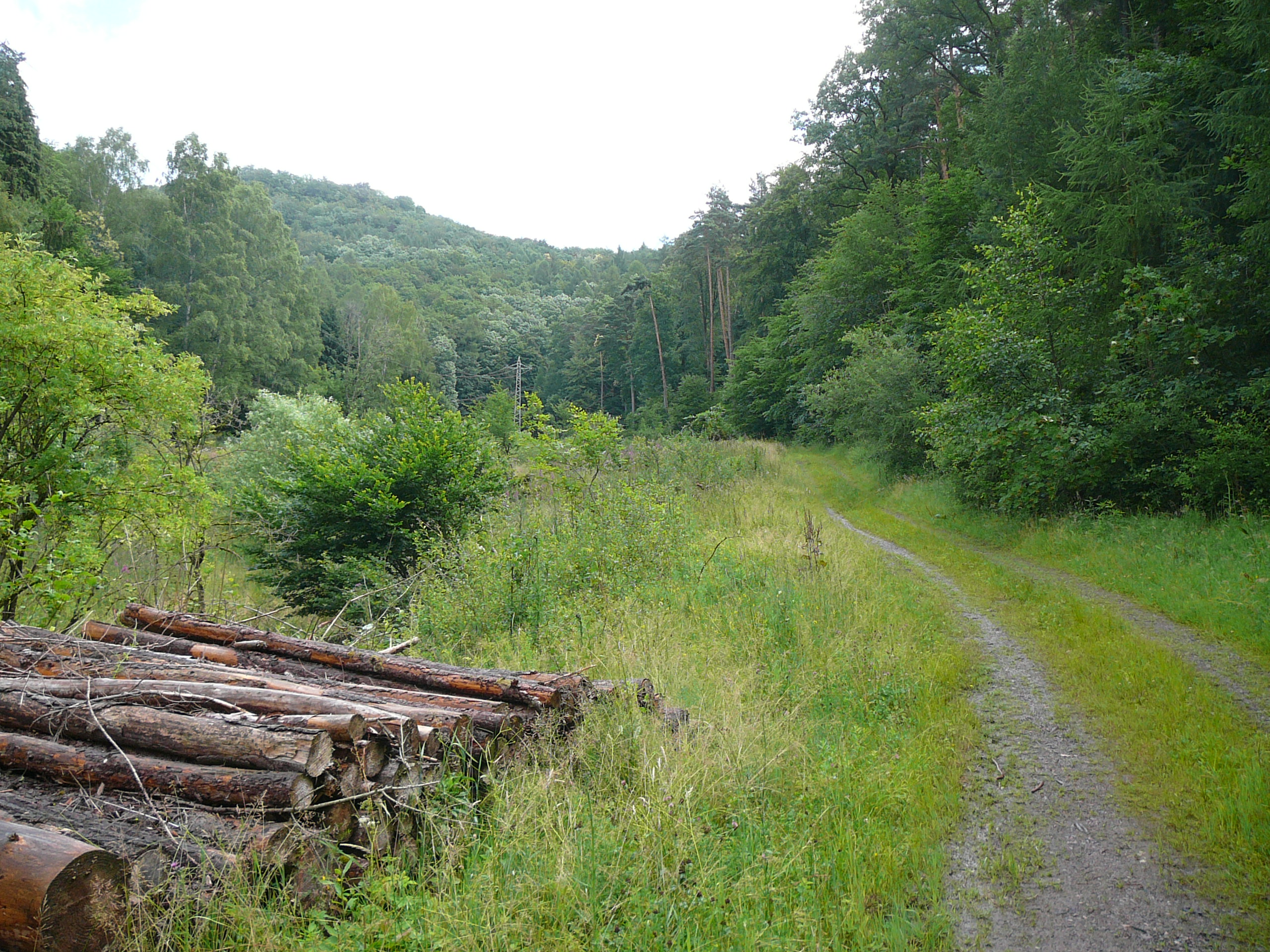

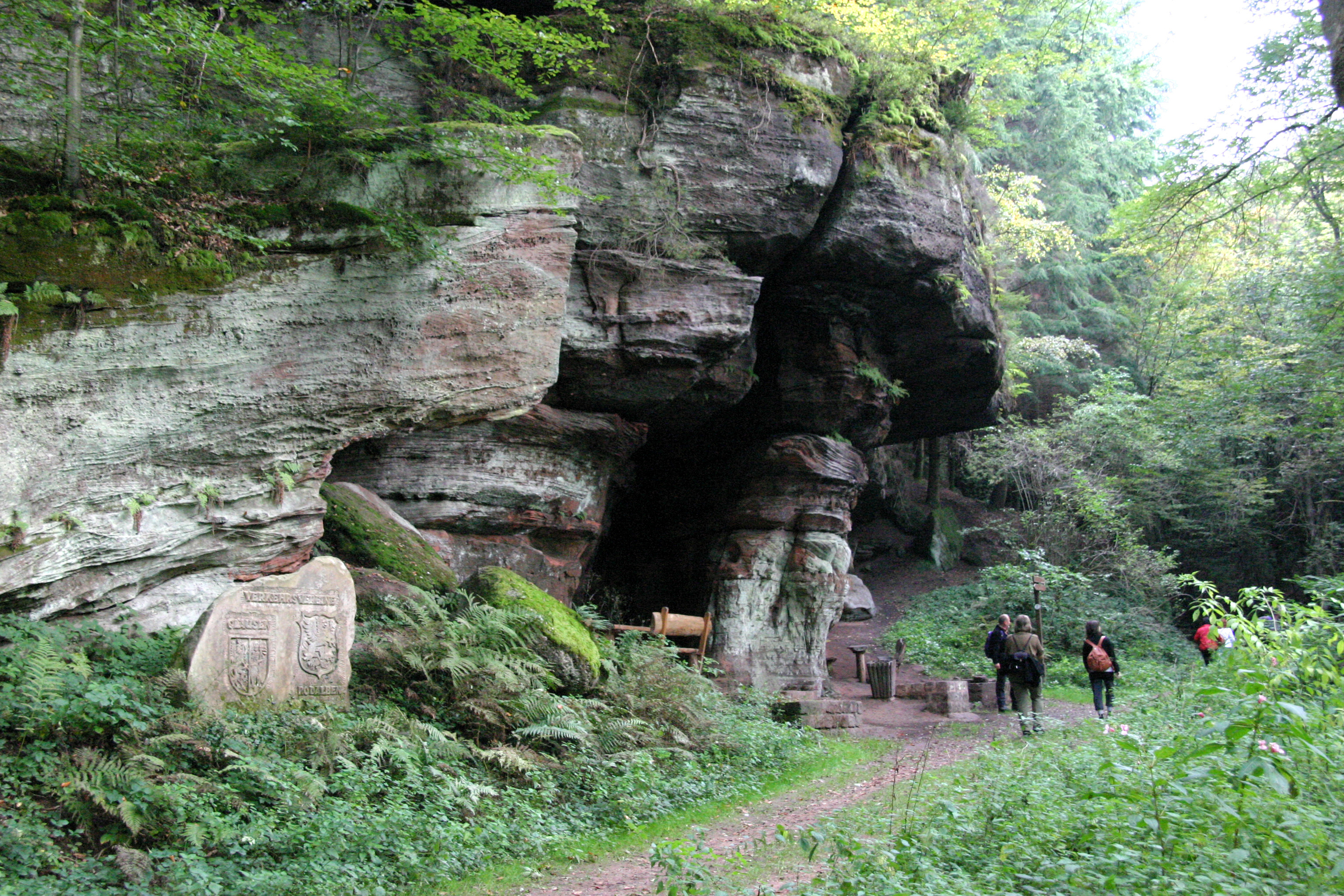
Eroded sandstone formations

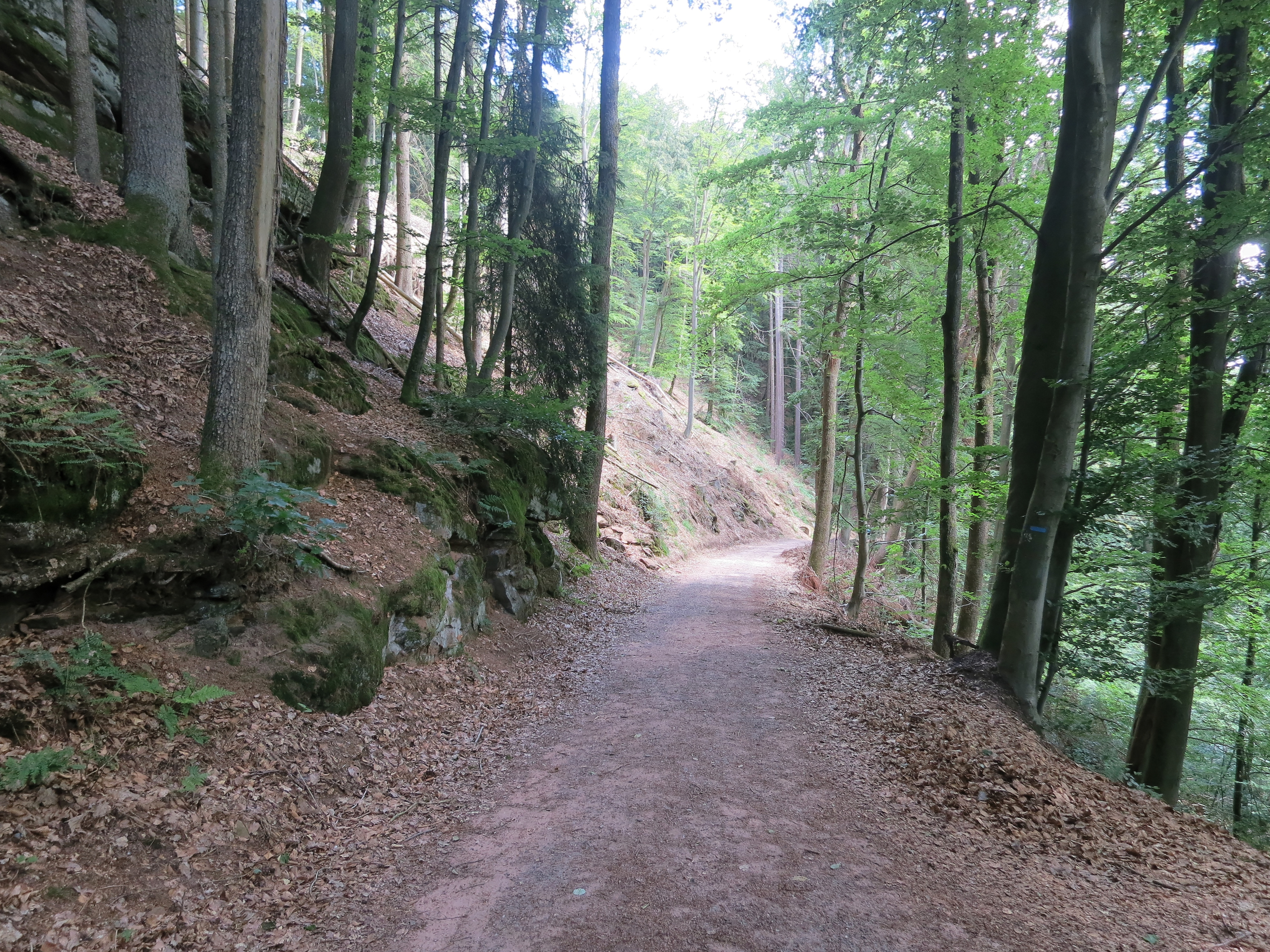
Typical hillside path

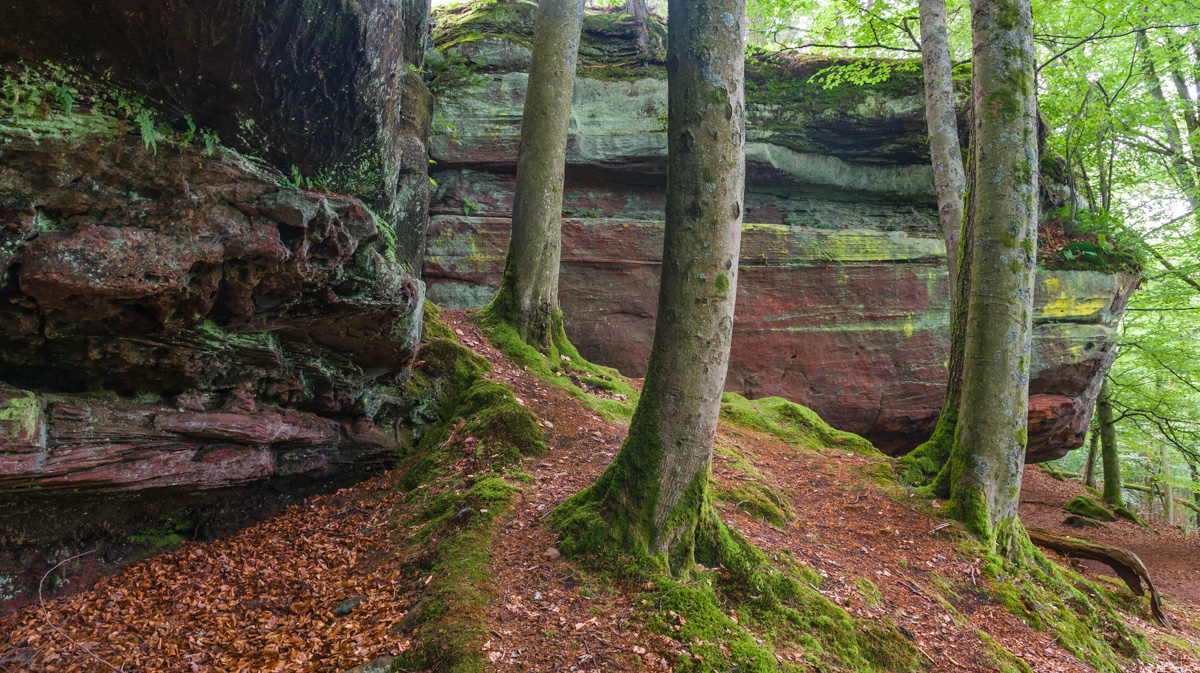

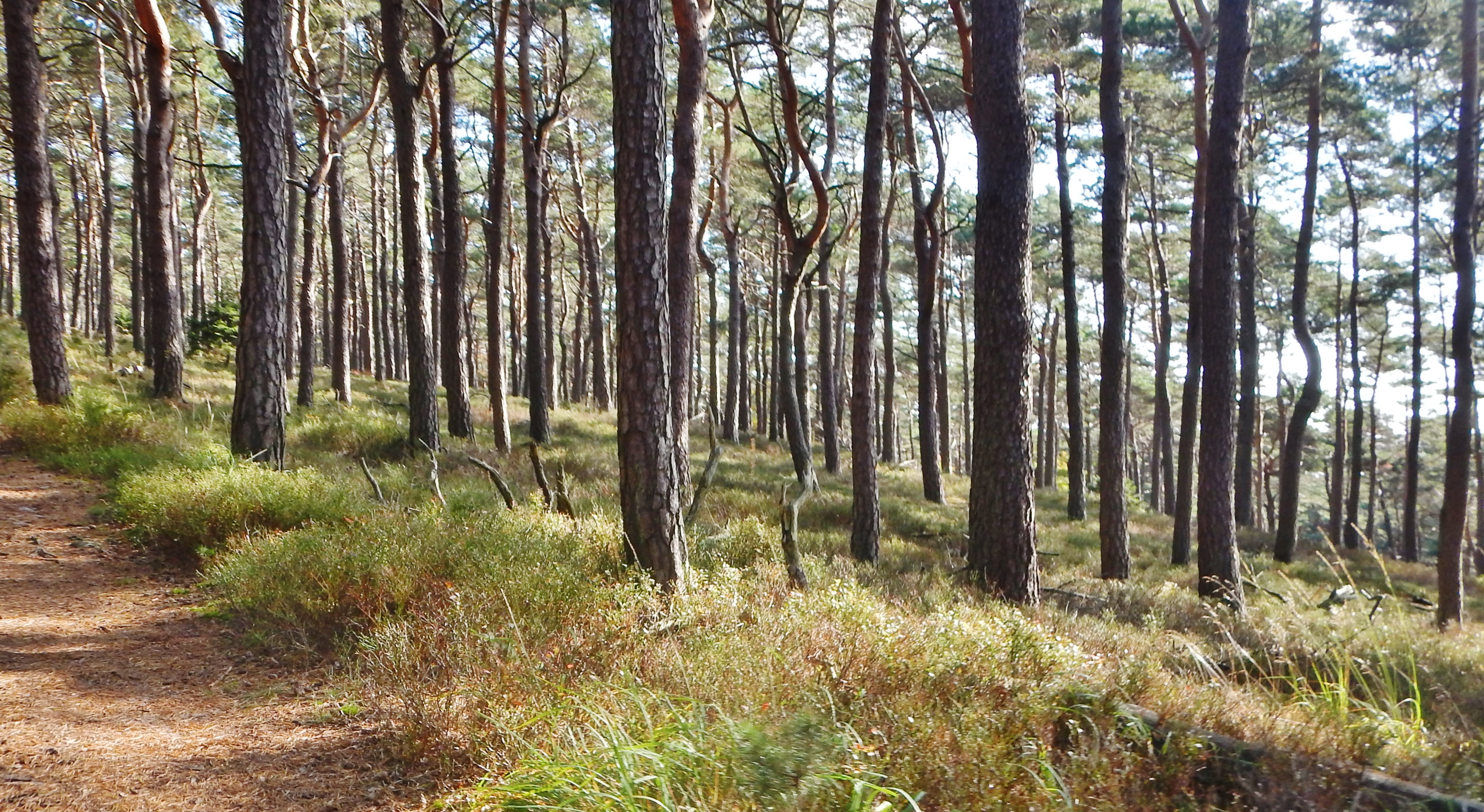
Pine woods

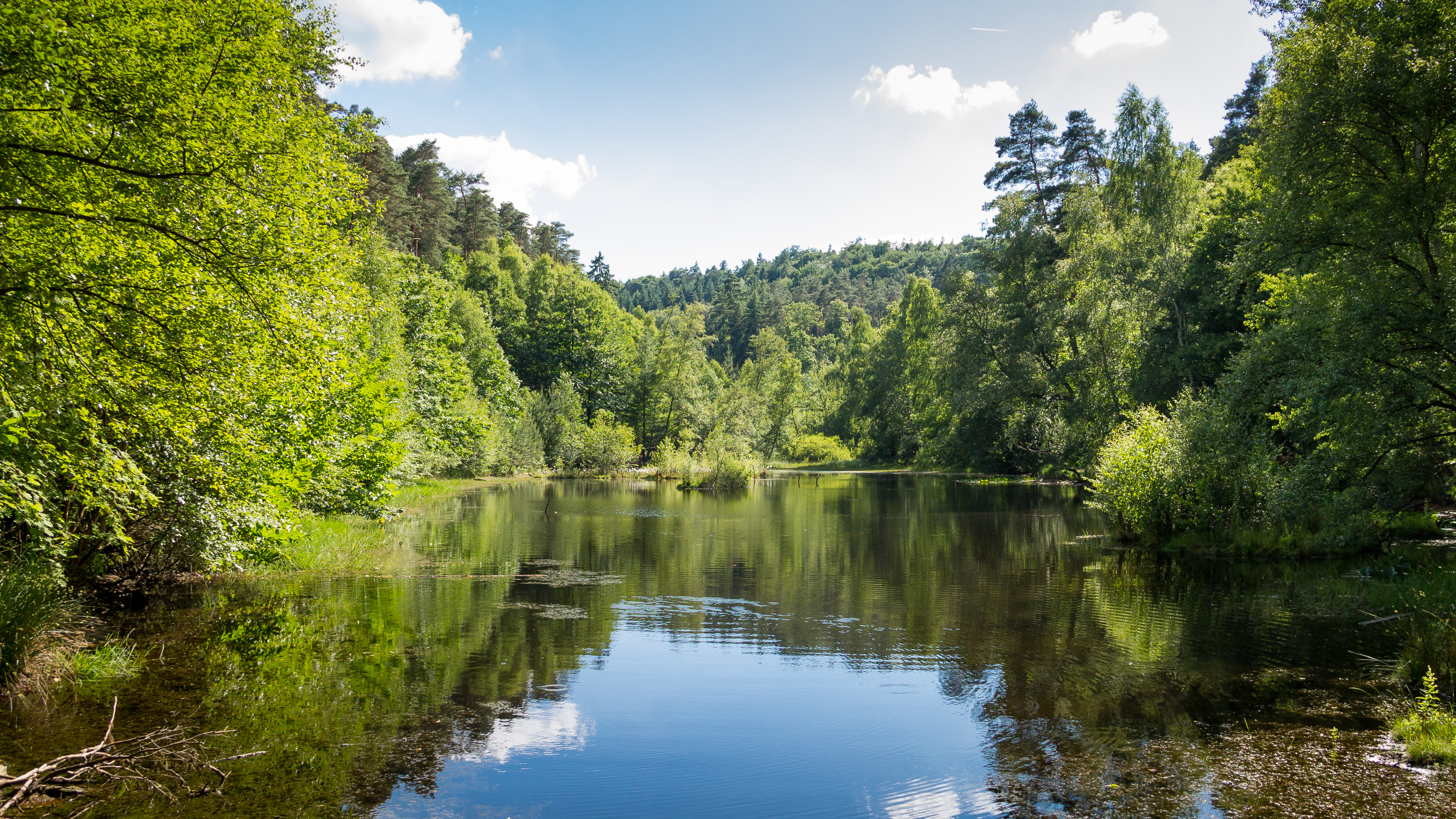
Forest lake (Ungeheuersee)

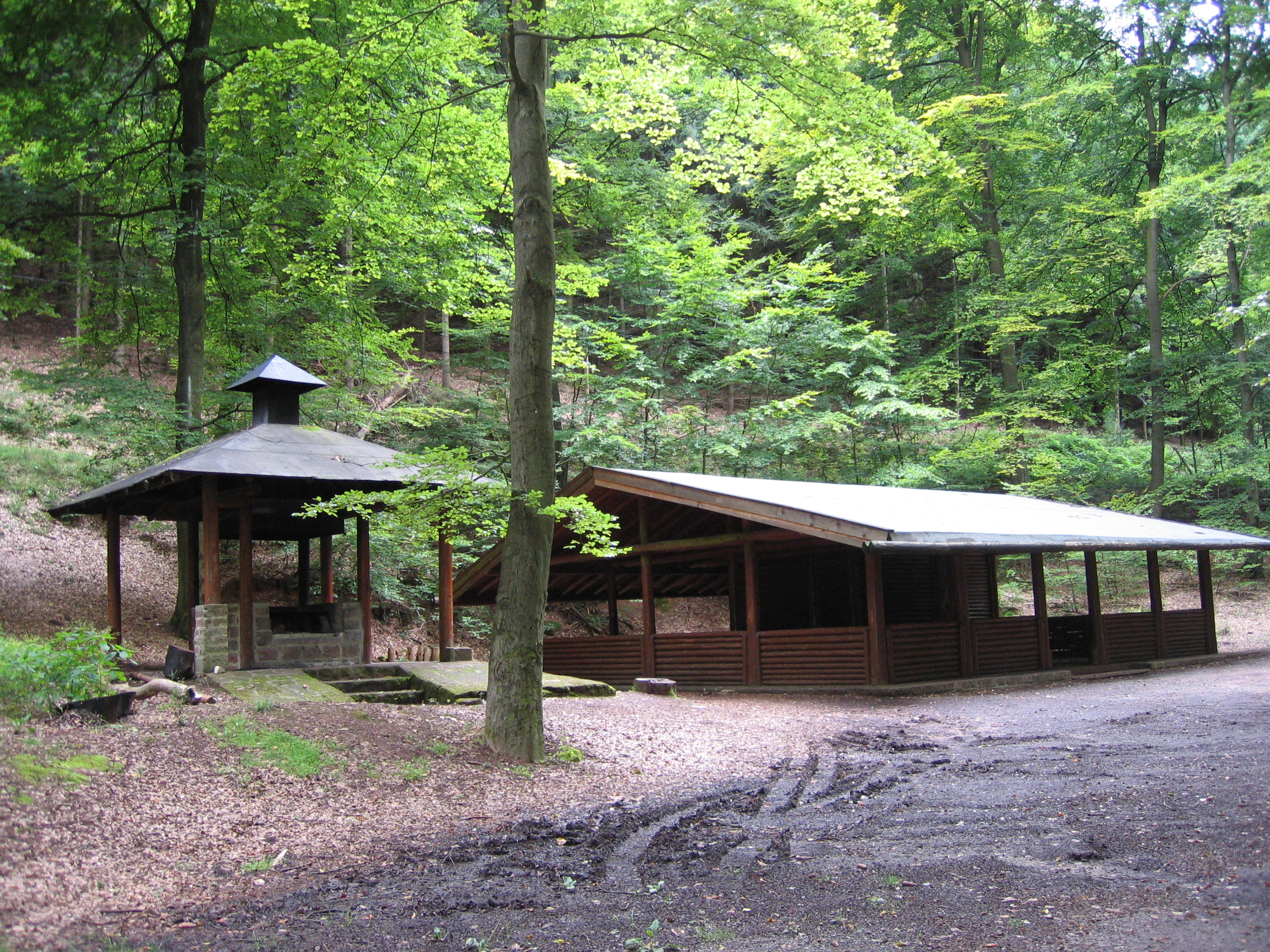
Hiking huts

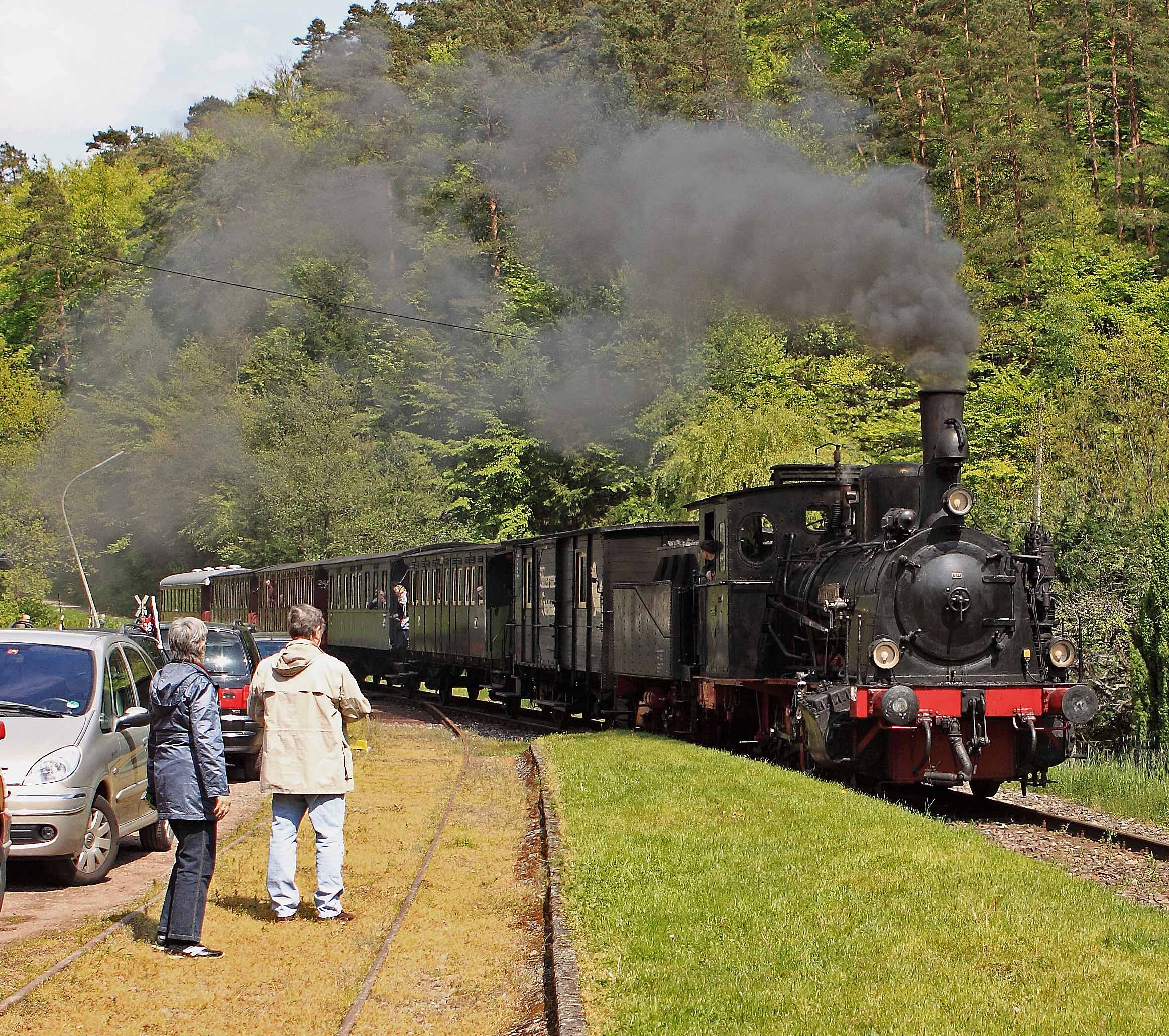
Old-fashioned locomotive

== See also ==
- Palatinate
- List of nature parks in Germany
