= Hamburg (disambiguation) =

Hamburg, officially the Free and Hanseatic City of Hamburg, is Germany's second-largest city and a federated state.

Hamburg may also refer to:

== Places ==
=== Germany ===
- Port of Hamburg, the deep-water harbor of Hamburg
- Hamburg (Bundestag electoral district)
- Hamburg (electoral district), Reichstag

=== United States ===
- Glenville, North Carolina, formerly Hamburg
- Hamburg, Alabama, an unincorporated community
- Hamburg, Arkansas, a town
- Hamburg, Connecticut, a town
- Hamburg, Illinois, a village
- Hamburg Precinct, Calhoun County, Illinois, a precinct and township
- Hamburg, Clark County, Indiana, unincorporated community
- Hamburg, Franklin County, Indiana, unincorporated community
- Hamburg, Iowa, a city
- Hamburg, Louisiana, an unincorporated community
- Hamburg Township, Michigan, a township
- Hamburg, Minnesota, a town and city
- Hamburg, Missouri, a ghost town
- Hamburg, New Jersey, a borough
- Hamburg, New York, a town
  - Hamburg (village), New York, within the Town of Hamburg
- Hamburg, Fairfield County, Ohio, an unincorporated community
- Hamburg, Preble County, Ohio, an unincorporated community
- Hamburg, Pennsylvania, a borough
- Hamburg, Aiken County, South Carolina
- Hamburg (community), Marathon County, Wisconsin, a town
- Hamburg, Marathon County, Wisconsin, a town
- Hamburg, Vernon County, Wisconsin, a town
- Hamburg State Park in Georgia
- Highwood, Hamden, a neighborhood in Hamden, Connecticut, formerly Hamburg
- Stadium/Federal Hill station, a light rail station in Baltimore, Maryland, formerly known as Hamburg Street

=== Elsewhere ===
- German name of Brezovička, Slovakia, municipality
- Hamburg (oil field) in Alberta, Canada, town
- Hamburg, Eastern Cape, South Africa, a city

== Plants and animals ==
- Hamburg (chicken), a breed of chicken
- Hamburg (horse) (1895–1915), a champion of thoroughbred horse racing
- Ulmus 'Hamburg', a tree

== Ships ==
- German frigate Hamburg (F220), a Sachsen-class frigate
- Hamburg (barque) (1886), a Canadian sailing barque
- Hamburg-class destroyer, German military ship class
- MS Hamburg (1997), a cruise ship
- SS Hamburg, a German ocean liner
- SS Hamburg (1969), a German cruise ship operated by German Atlantic Line 1969–1973
- USS Powhatan (ID-3013), originally the SS Hamburg (1899), a transport ship of the United States Navy

== Other uses ==
- Black Hambourg, another name for the German/Italian wine grape Trollinger
- Black Hamburg, another name for the German wine grape Black Muscat
- Hamburg, a short form sometimes used for hamburger
- Hamburg steak, a patty of ground beef
- Hamburg, a group in the Sri Lankan grading system for cinnamon quills
- Hamburg (surname), a German surname. Notable people see there
- Hamburg/ESO Survey, a star catalog published by the University of Hamburg
- Hamburg High School (Arkansas), Hamburg, Arkansas
- Hamburg High School (Hamburg, New York)
- Hamburg International, a defunct independent airline
- Hamburg (film), a 2025 thriller drama film

== See also ==
- List of songs about Hamburg
- New Hamburg (disambiguation)
- Hamberg (disambiguation)
- Hamburger (disambiguation)
- Hamburgh (disambiguation)
- Homburg (disambiguation)
- Gamburg (disambiguation)
