= Hamburger (disambiguation) =

A hamburger is a sandwich that usually consists of a patty made of ground meat, usually beef, and other items.

Hamburger may also refer to:

== Food ==
- British English term for a patty
- American term for ground beef
- Hamburger steak, a type of plated dinner

== Hamburg, Germany ==
- Hamburger, a native or a citizen of the city of Hamburg
- Hamburger SV, a football team in Hamburg
- Der Hamburger und Germania Ruder Club, a rowing club in Hamburg

== People ==
- Hamburger (surname)
- "Hamburger" Jones, American writer and comedian
- Professor Von Hamburger, a character in the Jets'n'Guns computer game

== Other uses ==
- Hamburger, a 1982 arcade video game that was later renamed to BurgerTime
- Hamburger button, a graphical button that resembles a hamburger
- Hamburger: The Motion Picture, a 1986 comedy movie
- Hamburger, a Zebra moray eel in the American television series FishCenter Live
- Hamburger (album), a 2000 compilation album by The Muffs
- Hamburger's Department Store, Los Angeles 1881–1925, became May Company California

== See also ==
- List of hamburger restaurants
- List of hamburgers
- $100 hamburger
- Hamburg (disambiguation)
- Hamburgh (disambiguation)
- Burger (disambiguation)
