= Homberg =

Homberg may refer to:

== Places ==
=== Germany ===
- Homberg (Efze), administrative seat of Schwalm-Eder-Kreis, Hesse
- Homberg (Ohm), in the district of Vogelsbergkreis, Hesse
- Homberg, Westerwaldkreis, in the district of Westerwaldkreis, Rhineland-Palatinate
- Homberg, Kusel, in the district of Kusel, Rhineland-Palatinate
- Homberg (Ratingen), in Ratingen
- Homberg (Duisburg), in Duisburg
- Hömberg, municipality in the district of Rhein-Lahn, Rhineland-Palatinate
- Homberg (Hinterland), mountain of Hesse

=== Switzerland ===
- Homberg, Switzerland, in the Canton of Bern

== People with the surname ==
- Wilhelm Homberg (1652–1715), Dutch chemist
- Herz Homberg (1749–1841), Austrian educator and writer
- Octave Homberg (1876–1941), French diplomat
- House of Homberg (medieval Switzerland)

== See also ==
- Homburg (disambiguation)
- Homburg (hat)
- Hamburg (disambiguation)
