= Hamberg (surname) =

Hamberg is a surname. Notable people with the surname include:

- Axel Hamberg (1863–1933), Swedish mineralogist, geographer and explorer
- Matti Hamberg (1932–2025), Finnish speed skater
- Nils Peter Hamberg (1815–1902), Swedish pharmacist, physician and forensic chemist
- Piet Hamberg (born 1954), Dutch former footballer and manager
- Theodore Hamberg (1819–1854), Swedish missionary in China and author, brother of Nils Hamberg

== See also ==
- Hamburg (surname)
