= Homburg =

Homburg or Hombourg may refer to

== Places ==
=== In Germany ===
- Homburg, Saarland, capital of the Saarpfalz district of Saarland
- Bad Homburg vor der Höhe, town and spa in Hesse
- Homburg Forest, (Homburgwald) a hill range in Lower Saxony
- Homburg, a quarter of Triefenstein, Bavaria
- Homburg Castle, in Nümbrecht, North Rhine-Westphalia
- Bad Homburg Castle or Schloss Bad Homburg, in Bad Homburg vor der Höhe
- Reichsherrschaft Homburg, a small state around the castle from 1276 to 1806

=== In France ===
- Hombourg, a commune in Haut-Rhin
- Hombourg-Budange, a commune in Bas-Rhin
- Hombourg-Haut, a commune in Moselle

=== Elsewhere ===
- Homburg, Switzerland, municipality in the canton of Thurgau
- Hombourg, Belgium, a village in the municipality of Plombières

== People with the surname ==
- Eril Homburg (1936–2017), Australian basketball player
- Ernst Homburg (born 1952), Dutch chemist and historian
- Hermann Homburg (1874–1964), South Australian politician and lawyer, son of Robert
- Robert Homburg (1848–1912), South Australian politician and judge
- Robert Otto Homburg (1876–1948), South Australian politician and cricketer, son of Robert
- Stefan Homburg (born 1961), German economist
- Valeska Homburg (born 1976), German journalist
- Wilhelm von Homburg (1940–2004), German boxer and actor

== Other uses ==
- Homburg hat, a semi-formal felt hat popularised in the 20th century
- "Homburg" (song), by British rock group Procol Harum, 1967
- Der Prinz von Homburg (opera), German opera by Hans Werner Henze
- The Prince of Homburg (play), German play by Heinrich von Kleist
- The Prince of Homburg (film), 1997 Italian film
- Homburg Canada, a real estate investment trust, owner of Montreal Central Station

== See also ==
- Hamburg (disambiguation)
- Homberg (disambiguation)
