= Hamberg =

Hamberg may refer to:

- Hamberg (surname), including a list of people with the surname
- Hamberg Glacier, South Georgia
- Hamberg Glacier (Greenland)
- Hamberg Lakes, two adjoining lakes near the glacier
- Hamberg, North Dakota, a city
- Hamberg, a 275 m summit in the Salzgitter Hills, Germany

== See also ==
- Hamburg (disambiguation)
