= Gamburg =

Gamburg may refer to:

== Places ==
- Gamburg, Missouri, USA; an unincorporated community
- Gamburg, Main-Tauber, Baden-Württemberg, Germany; a village that was merged into Werbach

== People ==
- Inger Gamburg née Mohr (1892–1979), Danish trade unionist
- Grigori Gamburg (1900–1967) Soviet violinist
- Yefim Gamburg (1925–2000) Soviet director

== Other uses ==
- Gamburg Castle, a castle in Germany, see List of castles in Baden-Württemberg
- Gamburg (grape), a variety of grape

== See also ==
- Gamsberg, a mountain in Switzerland
- Hamburg (disambiguation)
