= Hamburger (surname) =

Hamburger is a German surname, meaning "someone from Hamburg". Notable people with the surname include:

- Adolphe Hamburger (1898–1945), Dutch actor
- Bo Hamburger (born 1970), Danish cyclist
- Cao Hamburger, Brazilian screenwriter and director
- Christian Hamburger (1904-1992), Danish endocrinologist
- E. W. Hamburger (1933–2018), Brazilian-German physicist, and father of Cao Hamburger
- Hans Hamburger (1889–1956), German mathematician
- Hartog Jacob Hamburger (1859–1924), Dutch physiologist
- Jacob Hamburger (1826–1911), German rabbi and author
- Jeffrey F. Hamburger, art historian
- Jean Hamburger, French physician
- Jenő Hamburger, Hungarian communist politician
- Käte Hamburger, German writer and philosopher
- Mark Hamburger, American professional baseball pitcher
- Michael Hamburger, British writer and poet
- Michel Berger (born Michel Jean Hamburger, 1947-1992), French singer, son of Jean Hamburger
- Neil Hamburger, comedian
- Philip Hamburger, American law professor
- Raphael Hamburger, French producer and soundtrack music supervisor
- Samuel B. Hamburger (1852–1926), American lawyer
- Viktor Hamburger, German professor and embryologist
