= De Familie van mijn Vrouw =

1935 film

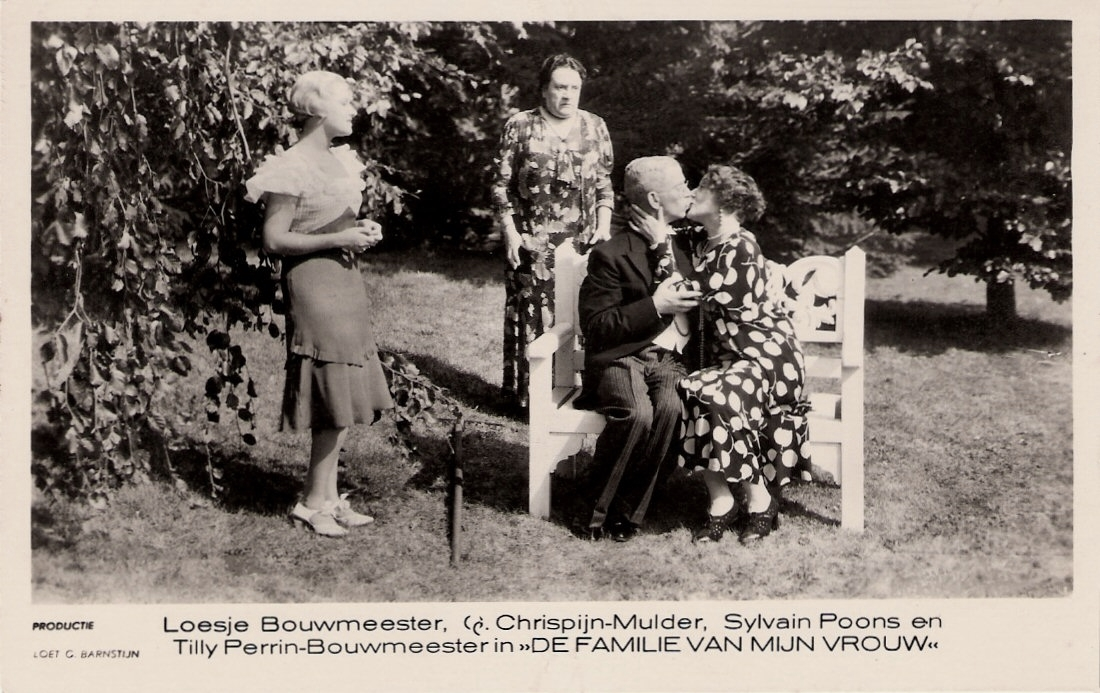
- Directed by: Jaap Speyer
- Written by: Alfred Duprez (play); A. Milo Bennet (play); Cor Hermus; Alfred Schirokauer
- Release date: 22 February 1935
- Running time: 93 minutes
- Country: Netherlands
- Language: Dutch

De Familie van mijn Vrouw is a 1935 Dutch comedy film directed by Jaap Speyer.

== Plot ==
Arabella, the strict matriarch of the Goedhart family, constantly monitors her children and imposes her will on her husband Josef. She is convinced that her eldest daughter, Peggy, is unhappy in her marriage to Wim Vrolik, an unsuccessful novelist, and decides to pay her a visit. Her son Max is staying with Peggy and is secretly married to the housekeeper, Mientje. When Peggy and Max are informed of their family’s visit, Mientje is particularly worried. The baby she secretly had with Max, who had since been staying with Barbara, is brought to her the same day.

On his way to the station to pick up his mother, Wim is harassed for the first time by a pushy street vendor and veterinarian Dr. Nix. He later comes across Peggy’s country house and resolves not to leave until he has sold them something. Wim immediately makes it clear that he is not welcome, but Dr. Nix refuses to be sent away. He successfully wins the trust of Fietje, who desperately wants to become a film star. Under the name Wim Vrolik, he sets her up with acting teacher Dolly de Raadt. Meanwhile, Arabella startles her son-in-law with the news that she’ll be staying there for a month. She suspects that Wim is having an affair and advises Peggy to be on her guard, but Peggy doesn’t think anything is going on.

When Dolly arrives at the country house, Wim mistakenly believes she has escaped from a nearby mental institution. He asks Nix for help in getting rid of her, but Nix mistakes the woman for Arabella. She thinks he’s a hitman sent by Wim to kill her. Josef, who mistakenly believes she is in serious condition, devotedly cares for her. Later, Arabella secretly goes through his things and finds Barbara’s letter. She thinks the woman is Wim’s mistress and immediately informs Peggy. Peggy bursts into tears and sends Wim away.

Meanwhile, Max is busy keeping his child a secret. Arabella and Peggy find the baby in her garden shed and think it’s the promised gift from Wim to make up for their argument. They don’t know that he actually bought a grand piano and that the baby has nothing to do with it, and a heated argument ensues. After a few ill-chosen remarks, Peggy decides to leave her husband, and Wim then wants to have the piano removed. Arabella hears him say that he wants to destroy the gift from the garden shed and thinks he wants to kill the baby. She confronts him, after which Wim tells her that Josef arranged for the gift.

Arabella thinks her husband has fathered a child and goes looking for him to confront him. She finds him with drama teacher Dolly, with whom he is acting out a love scene. She thinks she has caught him in the act and is furious. After the explosion in the garden shed, Wim, Nix, and Josef are arrested. They don’t know that before the garden shed blew up, Mientje had taken the baby out of there. Fietje later finds the baby in her room. She thinks this is a different baby who looks a lot like the one from the shed. She tells Arabella and Peggy about it, after which they conclude that Wim fathered the baby with Mientje. Eventually, Max and Mientje admit they are married and that the baby is theirs. Only then are all the misunderstandings cleared up, and Peggy and Wim are reunited. For the first time in his life, Josef stands up for himself and sends his wife away.

== Cast ==
- Johan Kaart as Dr. Nix
- Sylvain Poons as Josef Goedhart
- Gusta Chrispijn-Mulder as Arabella
- Mary Smithuysen as Peggie
- Loesje Bouwmeester as Fietje
- Adolphe Hamburger as Max
- Cruys Voorbergh as Wim
- Cissy van Bennekom as Mientje
- Tilly Perin-Bouwmeester as Dolly de Raadt
- Clara Vischer-Blaaser (as Clara Vischer)
- Nico De Jong
- Jan Blok
- A. Burgerdorffer (as Anton Burgerdoffer)
- Jan van Dommelen
- Lena Kemler
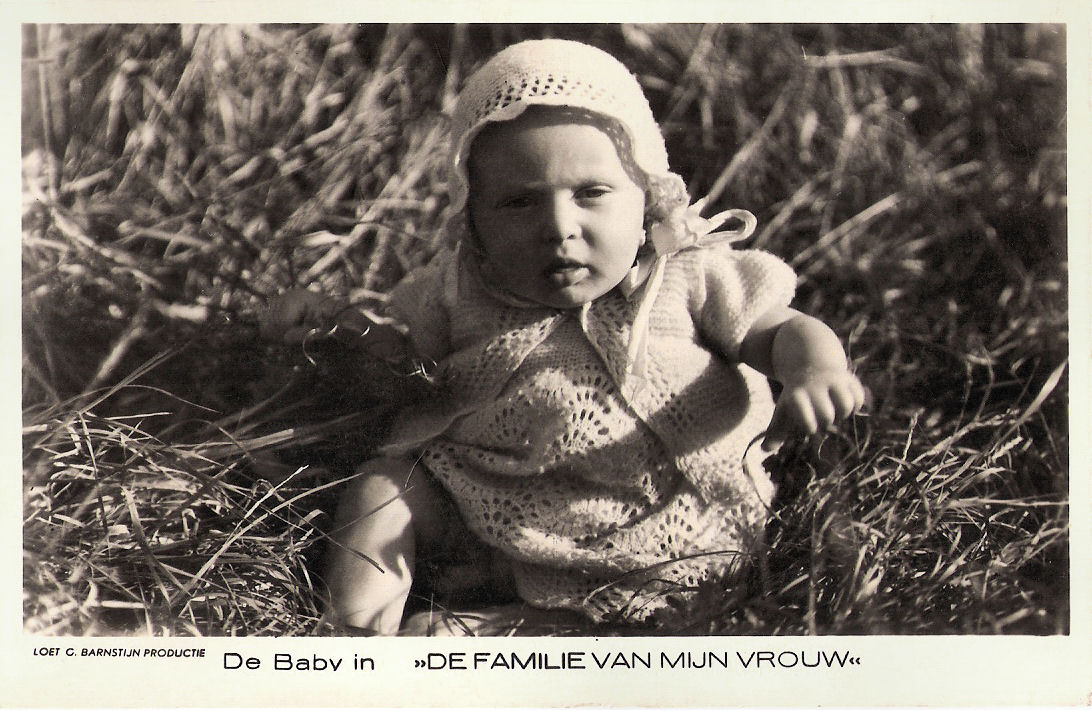

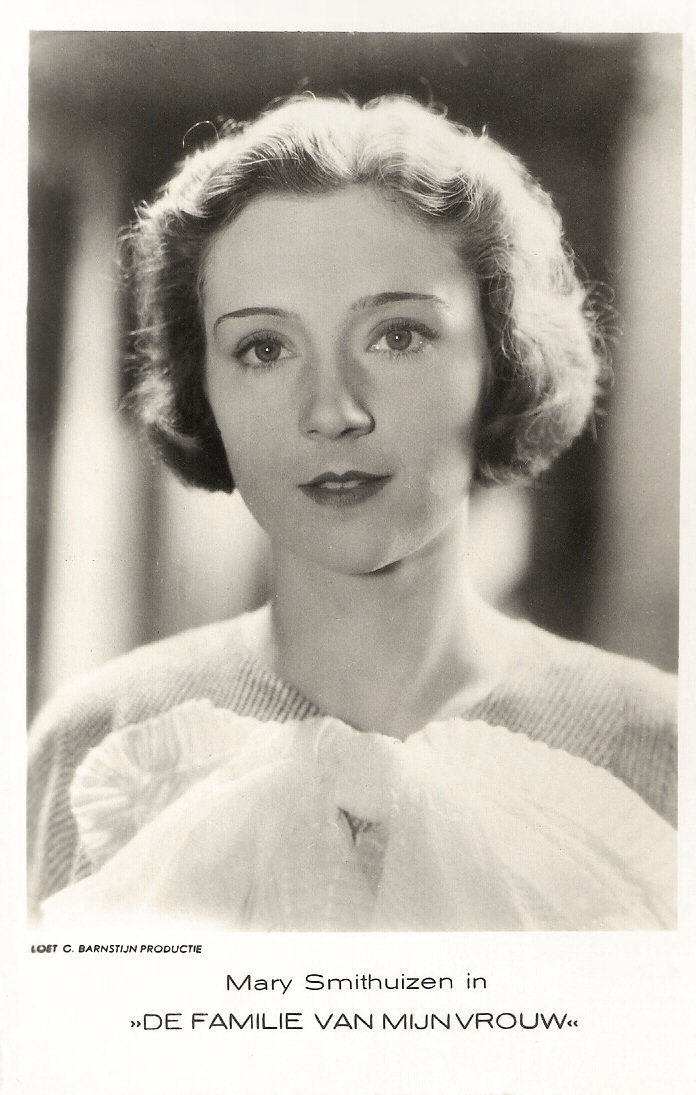

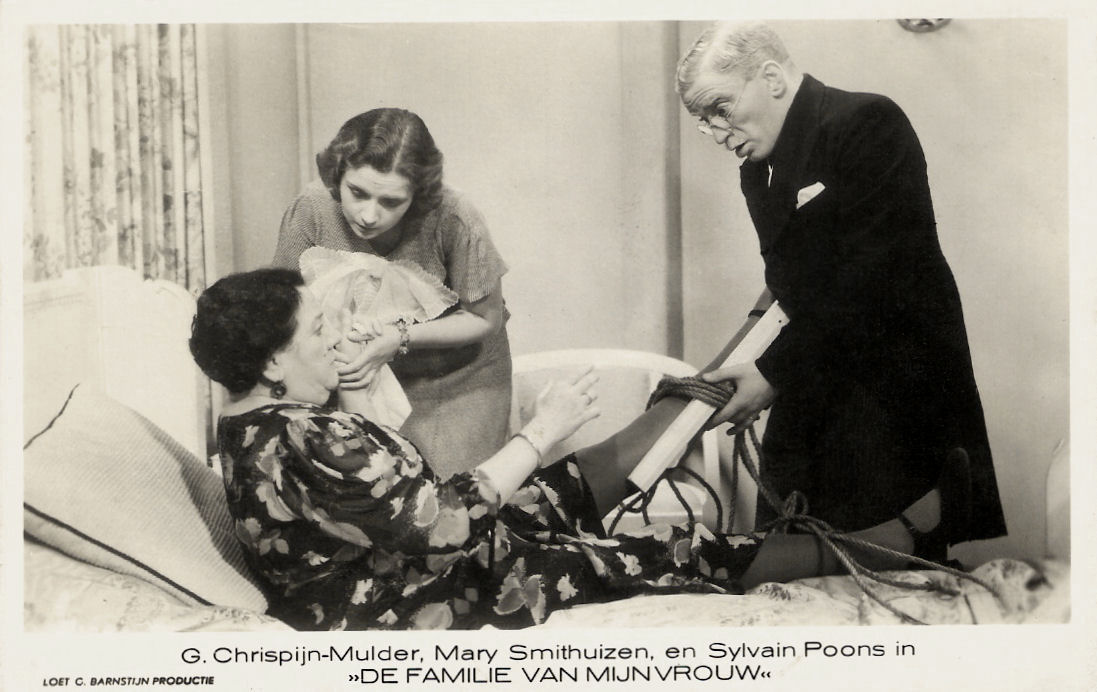

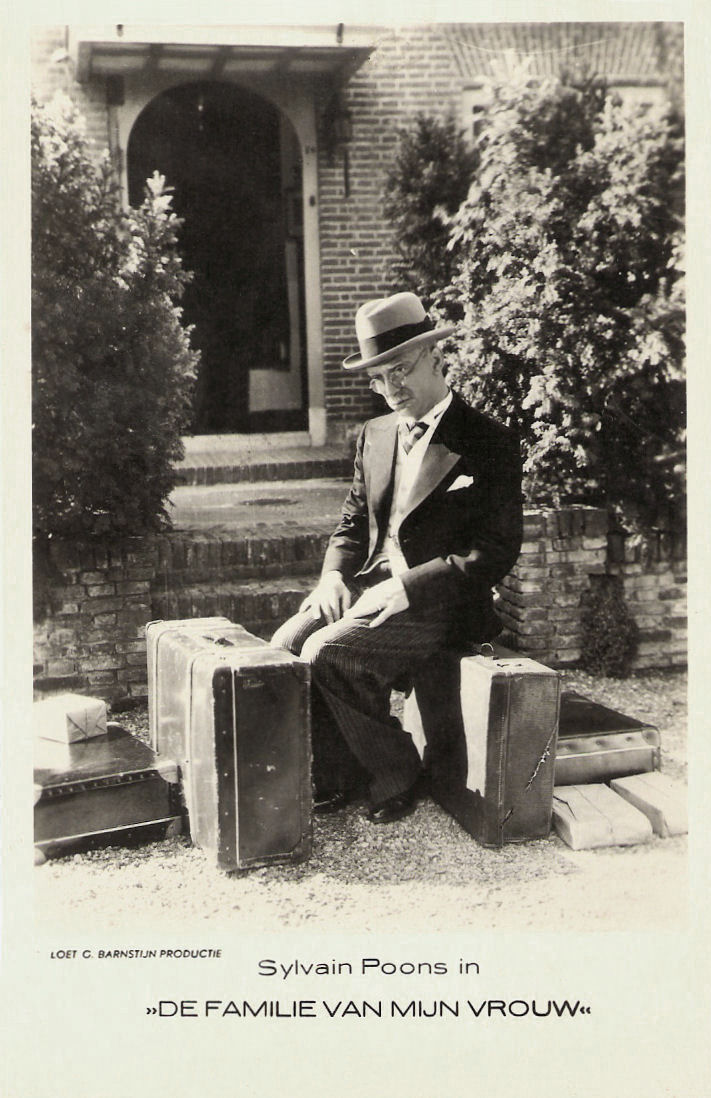
