= Brezovička =

Village and municipality in Sabinov District in Slovakia

- Municipality
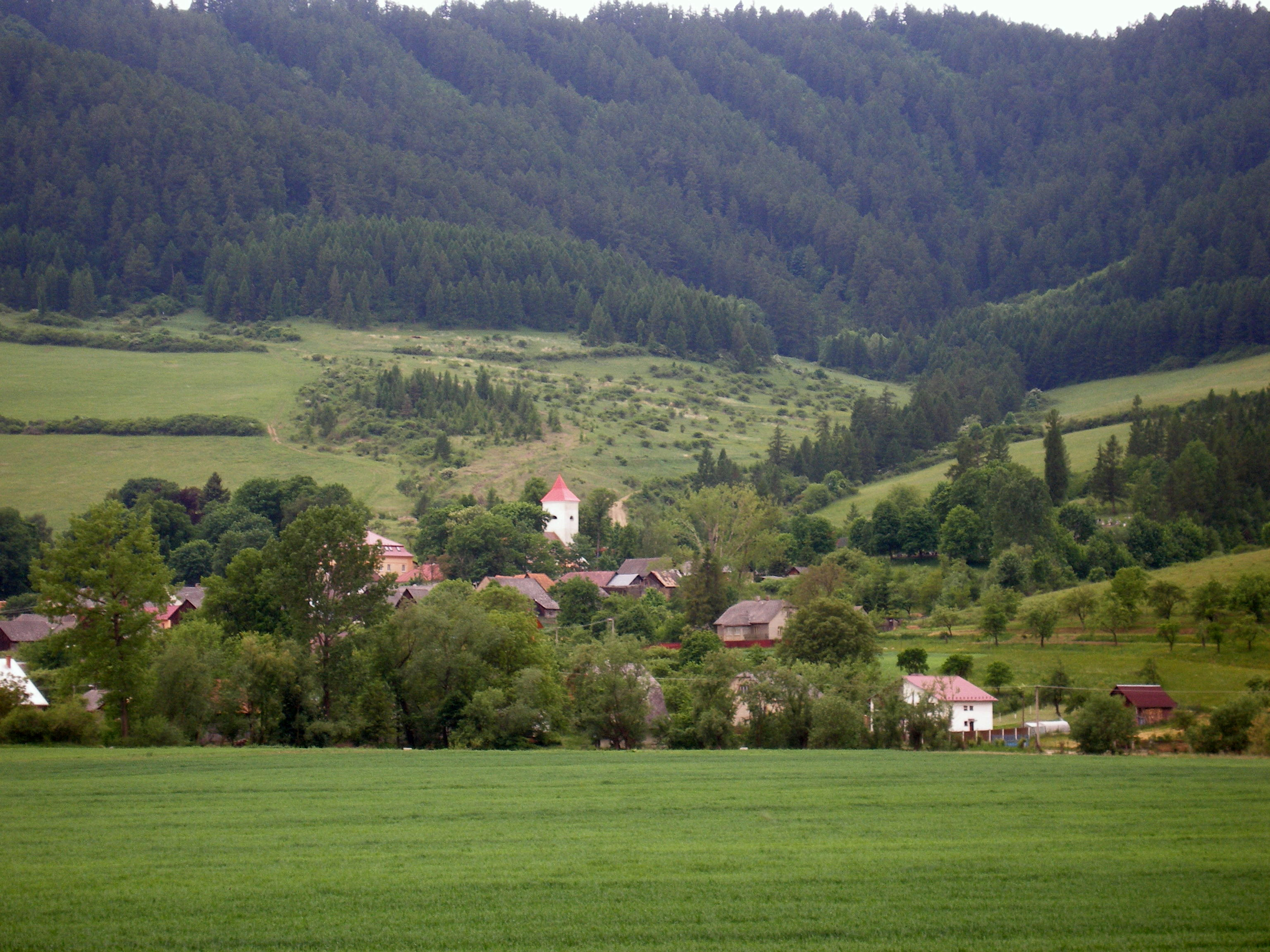

- Flag

- Location of Brezovička in the Prešov Region Location of Brezovička in Slovakia
- Coordinates: 49.13°N 20.85°E
- Country: Slovakia
- Region: Prešov Region
- District: Sabinov District
- First mentioned: 1320

Area
  - Total: 8.98 km^{2} (3.47 sq mi)
- Elevation: 467 m (1,532 ft)

Population (2025)
  - Total: 429
- Time zone: UTC+1 (CET)
  - Summer (DST): UTC+2 (CEST)
- Postal code: 827 4
- Area code: +421 51
- Vehicle registration plate (until 2022): SB
- Website: www.brezovicka.sk

Brezovička (German: Hamburg; Hungarian: Hámbor) is a village and municipality in Sabinov District in the Prešov Region of north-eastern Slovakia.

== History ==
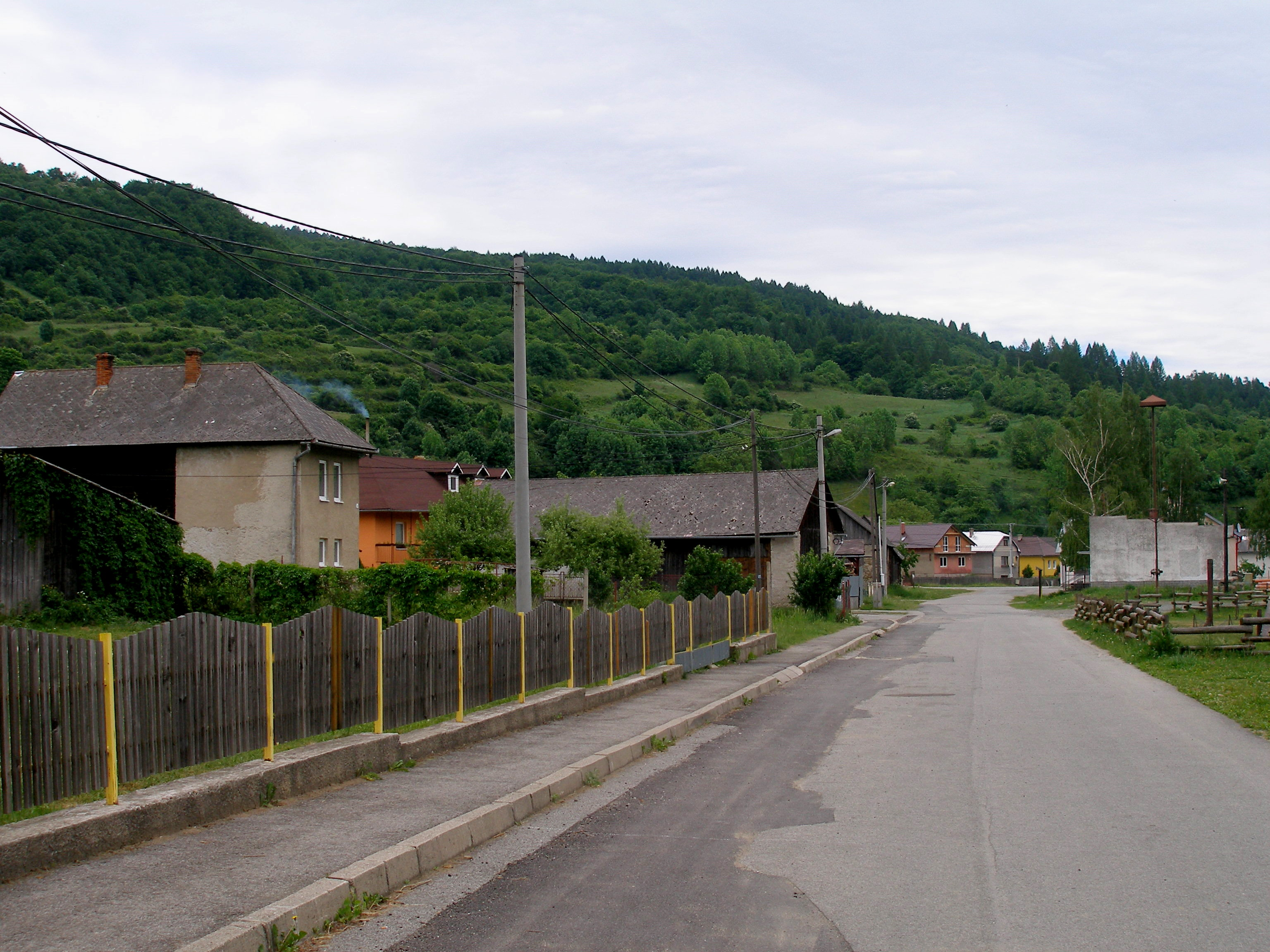
A street in Brezovička

In historical records the village was first mentioned in 1320 AD.

== Geography ==
The municipality lies at an altitude of 467 metres (1,532 ft) and covers an area of 8.98 km^{2} (3.47 sq mi) (2025).

== Population ==
Population statistic (10 years)
Year	1995	2005	2015	2025
Count	409	420	417	429
Difference		+2.68%	−0.71%	+2.87%

Population statistic
Year	2024	2025
Count	416	429
Difference		+3.12%

It has a population of 429 people (31 December 2025).

=== Ethnicity ===
Census 2021 (1+ %)
Ethnicity	Number	Fraction
Slovak	389	97.73%
Not found out	8	2.01%
Other	4	1%
Total	398	

In year 2021 was 398 people by ethnicity 389 as Slovak, 8 as Not found out, 4 as Other, 3 as Czech, 2 as Rusyn and 1 as Silesian.

Note on population: The difference values of population numbers in the table "Population statistic" and in the sections "Ethnicity" & "Religion" is caused by the use of various statistical methods.

=== Religion ===
Census 2021 (1+ %)
Religion	Number	Fraction
Roman Catholic Church	373	93.72%
None	8	2.01%
Not found out	6	1.51%
Greek Catholic Church	5	1.26%
Total	398	

In year 2021 was 398 people by religion 373 from Roman Catholic Church, 8 from None, 6 from Not found out, 5 from Greek Catholic Church, 3 from Czechoslovak Hussite Church, 1 from Eastern Orthodox Church, 1 from Other and not ascertained christian church and 1 from Christian Congregations in Slovakia.

== Genealogical resources ==
The records for genealogical research are available at the state archive "Statny Archiv in Presov, Slovakia"

- Roman Catholic church records (births/marriages/deaths): 1788-1895 (parish A)

== See also ==
- List of municipalities and towns in Slovakia
