= Adolphe Hamburger =

Dutch actor (1898–1945)

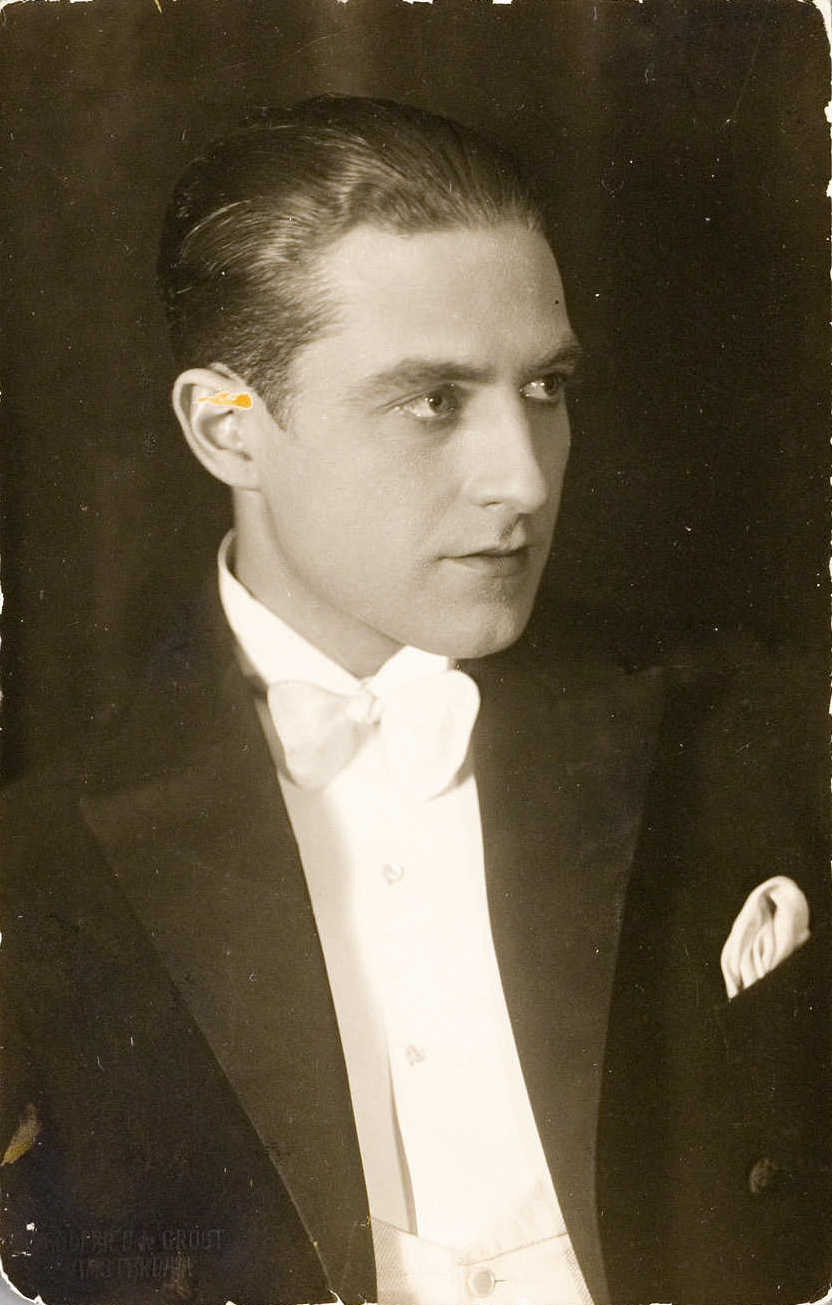
- Hamburger about 1930
- Born: Adolph Cornelis Maria Hamburger; 24 December 1898; The Hague, Netherlands
- Died: 9 February 1945 (aged 46); Dachau concentration camp, Nazi Germany
- Occupation: Actor
- Years active: 1924–1942

Adolph Cornelis Maria Hamburger (24 December 1898 – 9 February 1945) was a Dutch actor. He was active in theatre and film between 1924 and 1942. He died in the Dachau concentration camp in February 1945, only a few months before the end of the Second World War.

== Selected filmography ==
- De Familie van mijn Vrouw (1934)
- Amsterdam bij nacht (1936)
