= Hamburg (surname) =

Hamburg is a German surname. Notable people with the surname include:

- Charlie Hamburg (1863–1931), baseball player
- Daniel Hamburg (born 1948), American politician
- Joan Hamburg (born 1935), American radio personality
- Julia Hamburg (born 1986), German politician
- Margaret Hamburg (born 1955), American physician
- Roger van Hamburg (born 1954), Dutch swimmer

== See also ==
- Hamberg (surname)
