= New Hamburg =

New Hamburg may refer to:

== Places ==
In the United States

- New Hamburg, Missouri
- New Hamburg, New York
  - New Hamburg (Metro-North station)
- New Hamburg, the original name for the Original Highlands neighborhood of Louisville, Kentucky

Elsewhere

- New Hamburg, Ontario, Canada
- Willyaroo, South Australia was known as New Hamburg until 1918

== See also ==
- Hamburg
- Hamburgh (disambiguation)
- Novo Hamburgo, Brazil
