= Valeska Homburg =

German journalist and television presenter

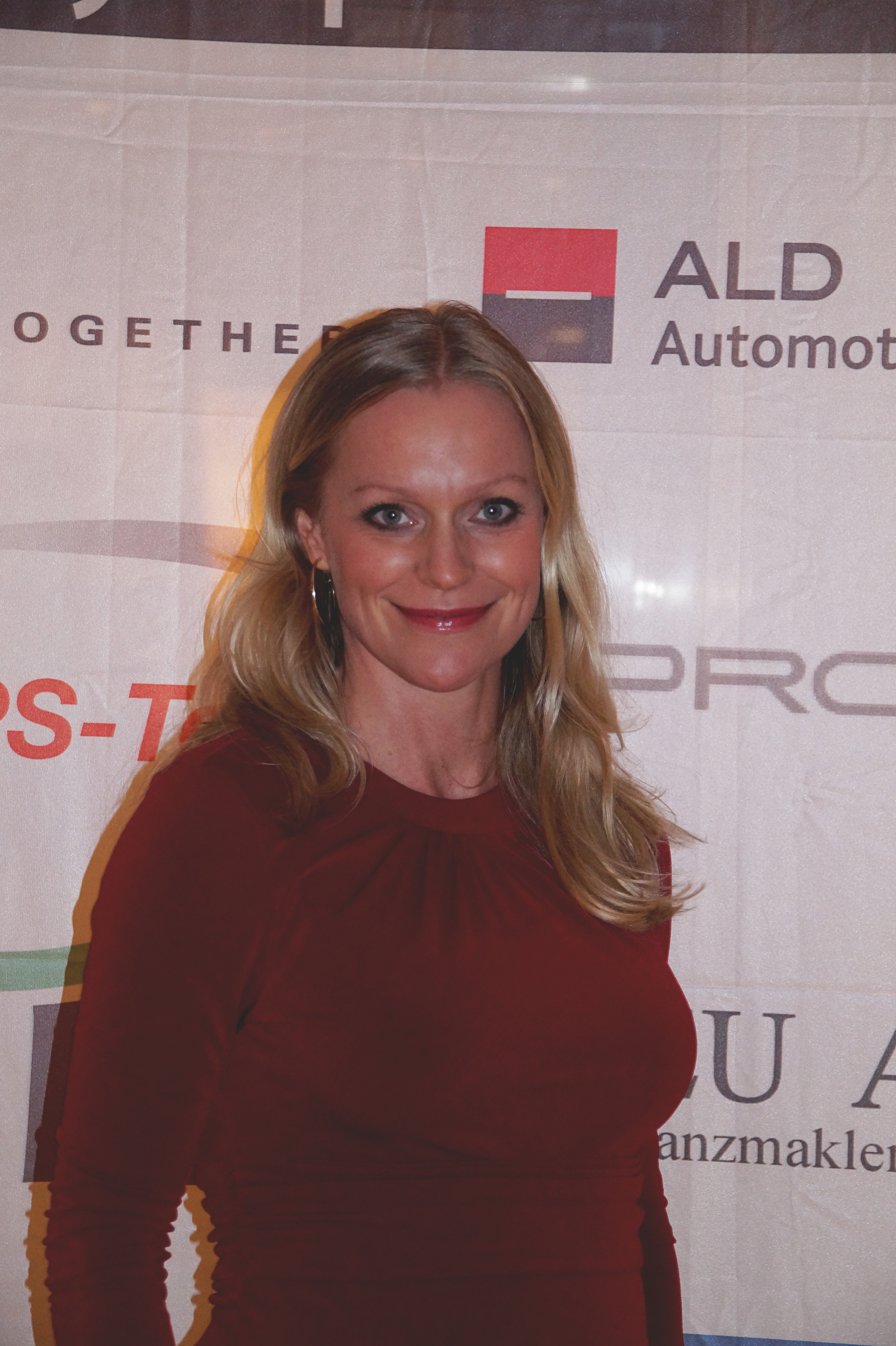
- Valeska Homburg in 2016.
- Born: 3 January 1976 (age 50); Wolfsburg, Lower Saxony, Germany
- Occupations: Journalist, television presenter
- Years active: 2001–present (television)
- Television: ARD (2001–2011, 2013–2020); SWR Fernsehen (2006–2011); N-tv (2011–2012)
- Website: www.valeska-homburg.de

Valeska Homburg (born 3 January 1976) is a German journalist and television presenter.

== Early life and education ==
Valeska Homburg was born in Wolfsburg the region of Lower Saxony. After her Abitur at the Fallersleben high school in 1995, she travelled for six months to Australia. Following that, she returned to Germany and began studying at the German Sport University Cologne. After completing her studies, she spent another year in Australia and worked for the Northern Territory Institute of Sport in Darwin as a sport science assistant. In 2000, she completed her studies as a qualified sports scientist.

== Television career ==
After working for RTL on breakfast television, n-tv, ZDF and Deutsche Welle, Valeska Homburg then joined Südwestrundfunk in Stuttgart in 2002. There she initially worked in the sports department and then for two years as a presenter for the news program Baden-Württemberg Aktuell. In addition, she presented between 2005 and 2006 on SWR Fernsehen the automotive magazine Rasthaus. From 2006 to 2011, she presented alternatively with Michael Antwerpes, Johannes Seemüller and Tom Bartels the Sunday evening program Sport im Dritten.

Valeska Homburg became known nationwide as a presenter of the winter sports on the broadcaster ARD. Since 2007, she is occasionally the presenter of the ski jumping on ARD, and later became with former ski jumper Dieter Thoma a presenter of the ski jumping world cups and the four hills tournament. In addition for ARD, she was among others a presenter at the 2006 Winter Olympics in Turin and at the 2010 Winter Olympics in Vancouver, as well as the FIS Nordic World Ski Championships 2005 in Oberstdorf, the FIS Nordic World Ski Championships 2007 in Sapporo, and the FIS Nordic World Ski Championships 2009 in Liberec. At the 2008 Summer Olympics in Beijing, she was part of the ARD team presenting the news on Olympia-Telegramm. She was also a presenter at the men's ski jumping and at the bobsleigh competitions at the 2010 Winter Olympics in Vancouver.

In addition of winter sports, Valeska Homburg was a presenter at the 2007 World Artistic Gymnastics Championships in Stuttgart, the 2011 World Artistic Gymnastics Championships in Berlin, and the 2010 FIFA World Cup. At that time, she presented the sport segment of the Tagesthemen on ARD. In summer 2011, she left both Südwestrundfunk and ARD.

On 12 October 2011, she joined the Deutsche Telekom station LIGA total!. It was mainly used at games in the West and South-West of the republic. As a news presenter on n-tv, she presents the sports news. Since May 2013, she works for Norddeutscher Rundfunk and presents the Sportclub. For the same channel, she was in 2015 in Montreal for the 2015 FIFA Women's World Cup.

== Personal life ==
Valeska Homburg is the mother of one child and lives in Cologne.
