= Theodore Hamberg =

Swedish missionary (1819–1854)

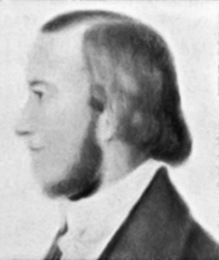
- Missionary to China (Image from Svenskt Biografiskt Handlexikon 1906)
- Born: Knut Theodor Hamberg; 25 March 1819; Stockholm, Sweden
- Died: 13 May 1854 (aged 35); Hong Kong
- Occupation: Missionary
- Spouse: Louise Motander (m. 1851)
- Relatives: Nils Peter Hamberg (brother)

Theodore Hamberg (Chinese: 韓山明 or 韓山文) (25 March 1819 – 13 May 1854) was a Swedish missionary and author active in China. He is known for his role in having authored an important account on the early Taiping Rebellion and for his role in establishing Christian missions in Guangdong province. He also laid the foundations for the study of the Hakka dialect in the West.

== Early life ==
Hamberg, born Knut Theodor Hamberg, was the son of sea captain Nicholas Hamberg and his wife Magdalena Lovisa Löfvenberg and the younger brother of the Swedish chemist Nils Peter Hamberg. His father died in 1830 when Hamberg was 11 years old. He began working in the office of British consul George Foy and maintained a close relationship with the family. Daughter Mathilda Foy, a writer, wrote about Hamberg frequently. After graduating from school, Hamberg worked as a commercial bookkeeper in Stockholm. He became a member of an association to support the Swedish Mission Society in 1835. Hamberg's conversion came in 1842 through the preaching of Pietist revivalist preacher Carl Olof Rosenius, whom he became close friends with and introduced to Mathilda. He and Foy were also godparents of Rosenius' first child. In 1844, he left the bookkeeping trade to join the Basel Mission under the influence of Peter Fjellstedt and with the support of the Swedish Mission Society. Hamberg spent the following two years in training at a missions school in Switzerland.

== Missionary work in China ==
In 1846, Hamberg was sent to China, where he arrived on 19 March the following year and started to work in the Guangdong mission, where he worked to convert members from the Hakka community. He also worked out a draft of the first description of the Hakka dialect, which provided the foundation to D. MacIver's Hakka dictionary. Hamberg initially worked under the influential German missionary Karl Gützlaff, but Hamberg gradually grew skeptical of Gützlaff's strategy of mass conversions; instead he advocated a more cautious approach, which in due course would bring him into conflict with Gützlaff and with the Basel Mission. After the death of Gützlaff, Hamberg was vindicated and he continued to work under the Basel Mission.

== Hamberg and the Taiping Rebellion ==
In 1852, Hamberg met Hong Xiuquan's cousin Hong Ren'gan, who had been separated from the rebellion and fled to Hong Kong. Hong Ren'gan also provided Hamberg with important information on the Taiping Rebellion, which formed the basis of a book Hamberg later published on the rebellion. The book was the first extensive account on the Taiping Rebellion in a Western language and remains an important source on the early life of Hong Xiuquan. Hamberg also instructed Hong in Christianity and baptized him.

Hamberg died in Hong Kong on 13 May 1854 after contracting dysentery.

== Works ==
- Report regarding the Chinese Union at Hongkong. Hong Kong: Printed at the Hong Kong Register Office, 1851.
- The visions of Hung-Siu-tshuen, and origin of the Kwang-si insurrection. Hong Kong: The China mail office, 1854.
