= Homberg (Hinterland) =

Hill in Hesse, Germany

Highest point
- Elevation: 459.8 m (1,509 ft)

Geography
- Location: Hesse, Germany

The Homberg (German pronunciation: [ˈhɔmbɛʁk]) is a hill of Hesse, Germany.
