= Hamburgh =

Hamburgh may refer to:

- An older English spelling of the German city of Hamburg, used up until the 19th century, from which the other meanings below are derived
- The former spelling of the town and village of Hamburg, New York
- The former name of Glenville, North Carolina
- A former town in Maryland where the Foggy Bottom neighborhood of Washington, D.C., now stands
- Black Hamburgh, another name for the German/Italian wine grape Trollinger
- Hamburg (chicken) or Hollandse Hoen, a Dutch chicken breed

== See also ==
- New Hamburg (disambiguation)
