= Humberg (Kaiserslautern) =

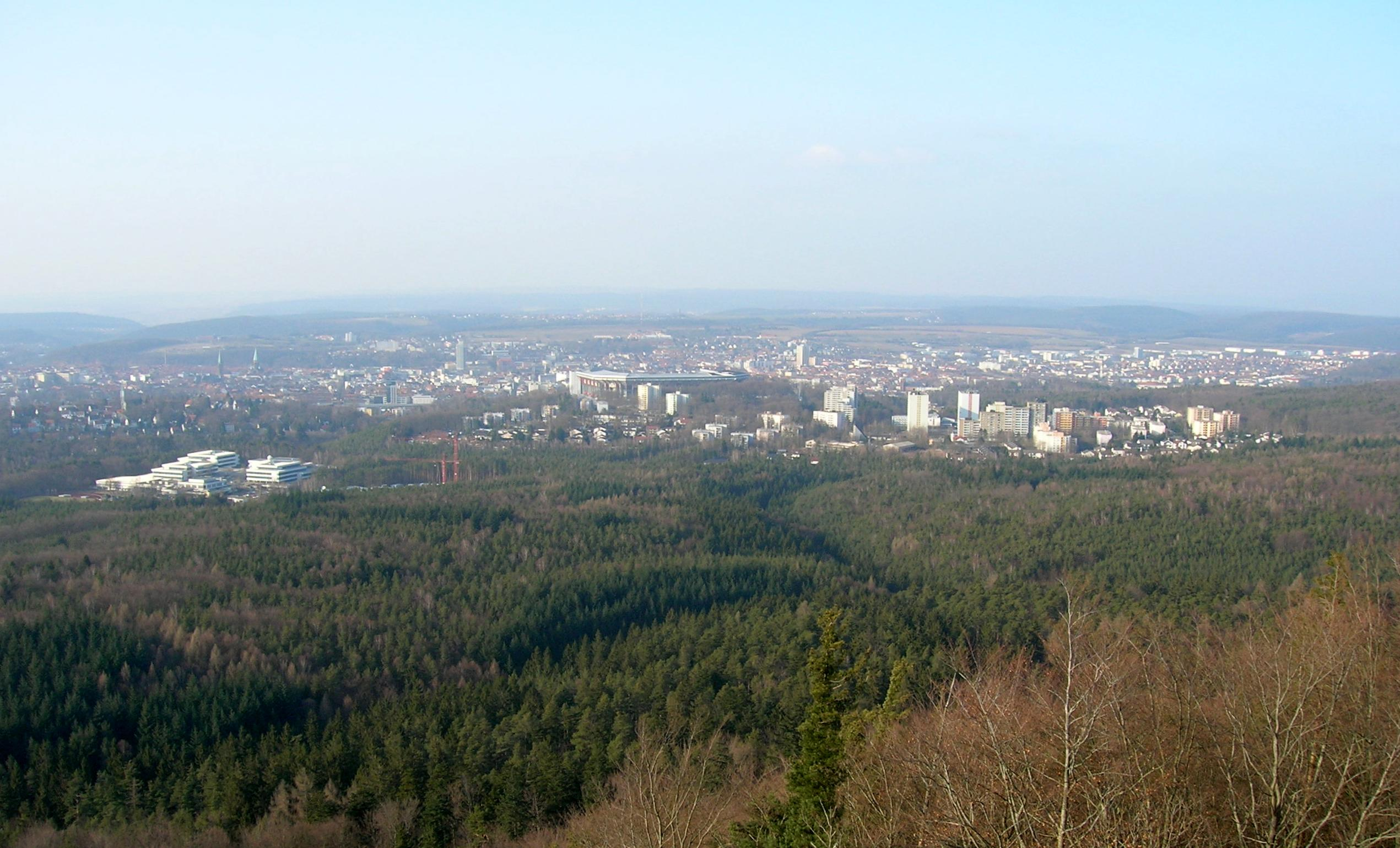
- View of Kaiserslautern from the Humberg Tower

Highest point
- Elevation: 425 m above sea level (NN) (1,394 ft)
- Coordinates: 49°24′48″N 7°46′03″E

Geography
- Location within Rhineland-Palatinate
- Location: Kaiserslautern, Rheinland-Pfalz, Germany
- Parent range: Pfälzerwald

The Humberg is a mountain in the south of Kaiserslautern, Germany, that stands on the border of the Palatinate Forest. With a height of 425 meters, it is the highest point in the area of Kaiserslautern. At its peak, the Humberg Tower (German: Humbergturm) provides a dramatic view of the area below.
