= Humberg Tower =

Observation tower in Kaiserslautern, Germany

Coordinates: 49°24′54″N 7°46′48″E

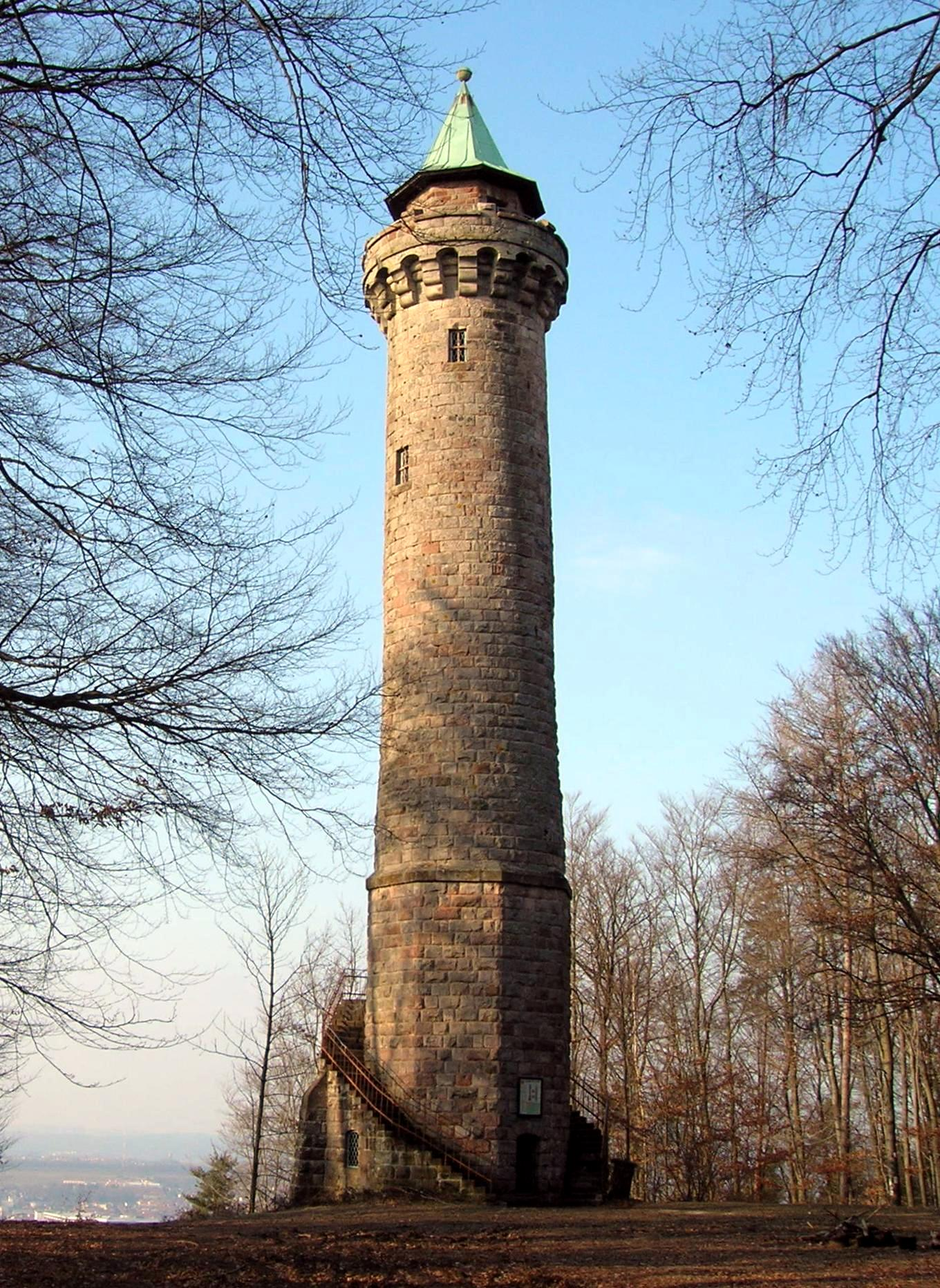
The Humbergturm

The Humberg Tower is an observation tower on the Humberg hill, 425 metres (1,400 feet) high, to the south of the city of Kaiserslautern in southwest Germany.

The idea of building a tower on the Humberg (already in those days a favourite hill among the citizens of Kaiserslautern, for its view) was taken up in 1896. For this purpose, inhabitants of the city founded the Humberg Association, with the aim of financing the building of an observation tower. Among the founding members were the well-known sewing machine factory owner Pfaff, the mayor, Dr. Orth, distinguished businessmen, Pfeiffer and Karcher, and malt manufacturer, Gelbert.

The tower was built to plans by the Munich architect, Ludwig Ritter von Stempel, who had already made a name for himself with some public buildings in the city. The Humberg Tower is a monumental construction of sandstone blocks, typical of the Wilhelminian period. Building began in the spring of 1899. The building material was quarried on the spot from the stone plateau of the Humberg. The tower was ceremonially opened on 2 September 1900. The tower is 35.77 metres (119 feet) high and its observation platform is 28.16 metres (93 feet) above the ground. The spiral staircase inside has 130 steps; in addition, there are a further 33 steps in the outside stairs at the base.

In 1909, the existing Humberg Association was dissolved. The tower and the association's capital came into the possession of the city of Kaiserslautern. In 2001, the Humberg Tower Association of Kaiserslautern e.V. was founded with the aim of preserving the tower and its attractiveness as a goal for hikers.
