= BBM =

BBM or Bbm may refer to:

== Arts, entertainment and media ==
=== Music ===
- B-flat minor, abbreviated as B♭m or Bbm
- BBM (band) ("Bruce Baker Moore"), former British rock supergroup
- BBMak, English R&B group
- Billboard Music Awards, BBMA
- Black British Music (2025), a mixtape by Jim Legxacy

=== Radio ===
- Numeris , formerly known as BBM Canada, an audience measurement organization

=== Television ===
- Big Brother Mzansi, South African version of the reality television franchise Big Brother

== Places ==
- BBM, IATA code for Battambang Airport, Cambodia

== Education ==
- Bachelor of Business Management

== Technology and information ==
- BBM (software), short for "BlackBerry Messenger"
- BBM Enterprise, Blackberry instant messaging client
- Break-before-make, a type of electrical switch
- Benjamin–Bona–Mahony equation

== Politics and government ==
- Bongbong Marcos, president of the Philippines
- Bintang Bakti Masyarakat, a Singaporean decoration
- Boys' Brigade in Malaysia

== Sports ==
- Best Bowling in Match, a cricket statistic

== Language ==
- bbm, ISO 639-3 code for the Bango language

== Other ==
- Build Better More, Philippine infrastructure program
- Barisan Berani Mati, Indonesian suicide attack units
