= Boys' Brigade in Malaysia =

The Boys' Brigade in Malaysia
- Briged Putera Malaysia بريڬيد ڤوترا مليسيا (Jawi)
- Abbreviation: BB (BBM)
- Founded: 1946
- Type: Non-profit organisation
- Headquarters: Petaling Jaya
- Location: Malaysia
- Members: 8427 (2019)
- Founder: Robert Davies
- Current President: Melvin Seah
- Affiliations: Malaysian Youth Council, Malaysian Ministry of Youth and Sports, Malaysian AIDS Council; Associate member of the Council of Churches of Malaysia, National Evangelical Christian Fellowship, Boys' Brigade Asia and Global Fellowship of Christian Youth
- Staff: 4
- Volunteers: 816
- Website: www.bbmalaysia.org

The Boys' Brigade in Malaysia or Briged Putera Malaysia (Chinese: 马来西亚基督少年军; pinyin: Mǎláixīyà jīdū shàonián jūn, Malay: Briged Putera Malaysia; Jawi: بريڬيد ڤوترا مليسيا) is part of the global Boys' Brigade movement.

The motto of Boys' Brigade in Malaysia is the same as Boys' Brigade, which is "Sure and Stedfast" that retains the old spelling of "Steadfast." In Malaysia, the movement is recognised both by the Ministry of Youth and Sports as well as the Ministry of Education as one of the approved Extra Curricular Activities (ECA) of the uniformed units type.

It is also an affiliate of the Malaysian Youth Council (Majlis Belia Malaysia), an associate member of the Council of Churches of Malaysia (CCM) and an associate member of the National Evangelical Christian Fellowship (NECF).

== History ==
1946 The Boys' Brigade in Malaya started in the state of Penang with the founding of the 1st Penang Company by Mr. Robert Davies with Mr. Geh Hun Kheng, an educationalist, as the Company Captain. The company was under the sponsorship of Madras Lane Chinese (English Speaking Section) Methodist Church.

1954 From Penang, the BB began to spread to other parts of Malaya beginning with the 1st Kuala Lumpur Company, which was formed under the sponsorship of Wesley Methodist Church, Kuala Lumpur. The movement then began spreading rapidly to other towns and small rural areas of Malaya to meet the needs of the Members.

1961 The movement spread its wings to East Malaysia with the formation of the 1st Kuching Company in Sarawak by the late Mr Charles Henry Ingka under the sponsorship of St. Thomas's Anglican Cathedral.

1966 The first National Review and Display was held in Kuala Lumpur. The event has subsequently been held 20 more times (as of 2013) and has been renamed the National Pesta and Convention.

== National Pesta and Convention ==
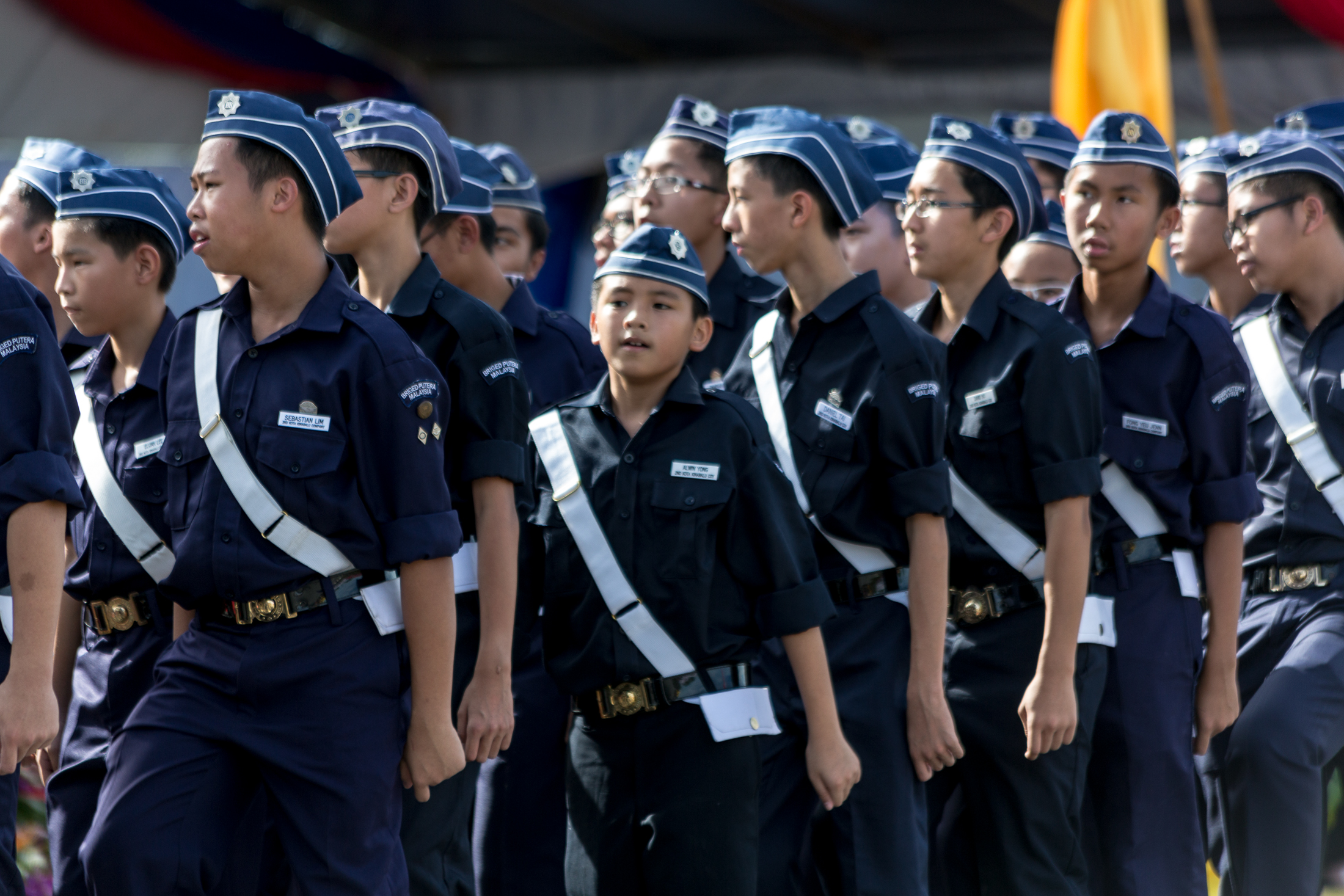
Briged Putera Malaysia during the 2013 Merdeka Day celebrations in Kota Kinabalu, Sabah.

The National Pesta and Convention (also commonly known as 'Pesta' ) began as the National Review and Display in 1966 is said to be one of the biggest events which is unique to the Boys' Brigade in Malaysia. Today, participation is open to all current members of the Boys' Brigade in Malaysia, as well as members of overseas Boys' Brigade companies.

Whilst games and other activities vary across each Pesta, it has been customary since 1966 for a national band competition to be held at every Pesta except during 1988, 1992 and 2001. A footdrill competition and a group singing competition was added to the tradition in later years. During the Pesta in Malacca, more element were considered for the Pesta overall title, which includes a State Council march past, size of contingent, banner design and other much more complicated processes in determining the overall champion. However, this system was not used in the following pesta, held in 2006 in Kuala Lumpur. The Kuala Lumpur Pesta 2006 more or less reverted to the traditional system of determining the overall champions, with an inclusion of one more event, which is the state sports. The Kuala Lumpur Pesta was won by 2 home companies, the 1st Kuala Lumpur and 3rd Kuala Lumpur. The State Sports competition was won by Penang State Council.

National Pesta 2020 Melaka (Dare 2 Be Different) was scheduled to be held from 1–5 June 2020, but was cancelled due to the COVID-19 pandemic in Malaysia. It was instead held virtually as the first virtual Pesta ever.

=== Pesta Hosts ===
Year	№	Host City	Year	№	Host City	Year	№	Host City
1966	1	(Selangor) Kuala Lumpur	1988	9	Penang	2006	17	Kuala Lumpur
1968	2	Penang	1990	10	Kuala Lumpur	2008	18	(Sabah) Kota Kinabalu
1971	3	(Selangor) Kuala Lumpur	1992	11	(Sabah) Kota Kinabalu	2010	19	Penang
1973	4	(Perak) Kampar	1994	12	Johor Bahru	2012	20	Johor Bahru
1975	5	Johor Bahru	1996	13	Penang	2014	21	(Perak) Kampar
1977	6	(Perak) Teluk Anson	2000	14	(Perak) Sitiawan	2016	22	(Selangor) Sungai Buloh
1979	7	(Malaysia) Kuala Lumpur	2001	15	(Sarawak) Kuching	2018	23	Kuala Lumpur
1981	8	(Malaysia) Kuala Lumpur	2003	16	Malacca	2020 (virtual online)	24	Malacca
						2024	25	(Sarawak) Kuching

== Sections ==
There are four sections for different age groups, which may vary from company to company. The general structure of each section is as below:

- Pre-Junior Section: 6 to 8 years old (Kindergarten to Primary 2)
- Junior Section: 9 to 11 years old (Primary 3 to Primary 6)
- Senior Section: 12 to 19 years old (Secondary 1 to Secondary 5)
- Primer Section: 19 to 21 years (Post-Secondary)

== Ranks ==
=== Members ===
The ranks in the Senior Section from Lance Corporal to Sergeant is categorized as Non-Commissioned Officers (NCO).

- Private (Pte.)
- Lance Corporal (L/Cpl.) (at least 14 years old)
- Corporal (Cpl.) (at least 15 years old)
- Sergeant (Sgt.) (at least 16 years old)
- Staff Sergeant (S/Sgt.)

Members that want to be an NCO are required to join the Basic NCO Training School (BNTS) and Advanced NCO Training School (ANTS).

=== Officers ===
This ranks attainable by Officers include:

- Warrant Officer (W/O.)
- Lieutenant (Lt.)
- Hononary Captain (H/Capt.)
- Captain (Capt.)
- Chaplain (Chap.)

== Badges and awards ==
Participation and achievements in Brigade activities are recognised by individual companies by the presentation of badges to company members in official ceremonies. Brigade members wear their earned badges on their uniform sleeves, on both upper arms. The highest award attainable in the Boys' Brigade in Malaysia is the Founder's Badge (see below).

=== Pre-Junior and Junior Section ===
This list is ordered from lowest level to highest level.

Badge	Section
Pink Badge (cotton)	Pre-Junior
Orange Badge (cotton)	Pre-Junior
Grey Badge (cotton)	Pre-Junior
Junior One-Year Service	Junior
Junior Recruitment	Junior
White Badge	Junior
Green Badge	Junior
Purple Badge	Junior
Blue Badge	Junior
Red Badge	Junior
Silver Badge	Junior
Gold Badge	Junior

=== Senior Section ===
The badges in Senior Section can be divided into 3 categories: Service awards, Special awards and Proficiency Achievement awards; and five groups: mandatory/compulsory, Interest (Group A), Adventure (Group B), Community (Group C) and Physical (Group D). This list is ordered alphabetically, then from lowest level to highest level.

Members with advanced level for any Proficiency Achievement awards receives a red cloth to be put under the badge with advanced level to indicate that the badge is in advanced level.

Elective	Type	Group	Notes
Target	Comp.	Comp.	No advanced level
Arts	Elective	A	Was named as Arts, Crafts and Hobbies badge
Athletics	Elective	D	
Bandsman's	Elective	A	Band Proficiency award; may require participation in company's band
Bugler's	Elective	A	Band Proficiency award; may require participation in company's band
Camper's	Elective	B	
Christian Education	Comp.	Comp.	
Citizenship	Elective	C	
Communication	Elective	A	
Community Service	Elective	C	
Computer Knowledge	Elective	A	
Crafts	Elective	A	Separated from Arts, Crafts and Hobbies badge
Drill	Comp.	Comp.	
Drummer's	Elective	A	Band Proficiency award; may require participation in company's band
Environmental Conservation	Elective	D	
Expedition	Elective	B	
Fireman	Elective	C	Named as Fire and Rescue in some companies
First Aid	Elective	C	
Gymnastics	Elective	D	
Hobbies	Elective	A	Separated from Arts, Crafts and Hobbies badge
International Relationship	Elective	A	
Life Saving	Elective	C	
Martial Arts	Elective	D	
Naturalist's	Elective	A	Named Natural Awareness in some companies
Physical Training	Elective	D	
Piper's	Elective	A	Band Proficiency award; may require participation in company's band
Recruitment	Comp.	Comp.	
Safety	Elective	C	
Sportsman's	Elective	D	
Swimming	Elective	D	
Water Adventure	Elective	D	
Junior Section Link Badge	Service		Worn on top of name tag, only for members that joined Junior Section
(National level event)	Special		E.g. from PESTA, may be worn on top of name tag for a period of time
Junior Service Badge	Service		Only for members that joined Junior Section
One Year Service	Service		
Three Year Service	Service		
NCO Proficiency Star	Special		
Long Year Service	Service		
Bronze Scholastics	Special		Obtained for 3A 1B in UPSR or equivalent level
Silver Scholastics	Special		Obtained for 4A 2B in PMR/PT3 or equivalent level
Gold Scholastics	Special		Obtained for 3A in SPM or GCE O level or equivalent level
Gold Badge	Special		Obtainable during Junior Section
President Badge	Special		
Cross of Heroism	Special		Obtained with Diploma for Gallant Conduct
Founder's Badge	Special		

=== Founders's Badge ===
The Founder's Award (also known as Founder's Badge) is the highest award attainable in the Senior Section of the Boys' Brigade in Malaysia. Those who attained this award are called a Founder's Man. In countries where King Charles III is head of state, the equivalent award is the King's Badge, and accordingly the members attaining the award are known as King's Men. First introduced in 1962, the Founder's Award remains an extremely exclusive award for Malaysian Boys' Brigade members, with less than 250 members in the whole country achieving the Award from its inception until today. The title of Founder's Man is held for life, but the badge itself may only be worn while serving as a NCO, Staff-Sergeant, or Primer.

The badge is cast from unpolished copper, giving it a bronze appearance, and is relatively heavy compared to other badges. The border of the Badge bears the words "Founder's Badge, The Boys' Brigade" and the BB Emblem on top. In the centre of the badge, there is the image of the Boys' Brigade Founder, Sir William Alexander Smith.

Requirements include earning at least the rank of Lance Corporal, 5 years of service in the Senior Section and/or Primer Section of the Boys' Brigade, attained the President's Award, and nomination from the Officer's Council (These are the requirements for the award in Malaysia - the requirements vary from country to country, most notably in Singapore where the most prestigious BB award is the President's Award rather than the Founder's Badge, although the Founder's Badge is one of their awards). The winners of the Founder's Award represent the ideal Brigade Boy, who has embraced the BB Method of Discipline and Religion as twin pillars, as well as exhibited a wholesome development in the four aspects of the BB, which are Social, Spiritual, Educational and Physical.

== List of BB Companies in Malaysia ==
As of 2019, there are 127 BB companies in Malaysia. Each BB company in Malaysia is identified by a unique number and the geographical location, namely the town or city, or district or state where the sponsoring authority exist, to represent that company. In general, the smaller the number is, the earlier the company was founded. There are, however, instances of newer companies inheriting the nomenclature of previous companies, especially if the sponsoring authority of the new company was also the same for the defunct company. One example would be the 1st Petaling Jaya Company; established in 1983; which inherited the nomenclature of an older company; which existed from 1959 - 1979; by the same designation.

=== State Councils ===
The BB companies in Malaysia are organised into regional groupings known as State Councils. Each company is categorised into the appropriate State Councils based on its geographical location. A State Commissioner is elected bi-ennially to head each State Council.

The BB companies are listed in the tables below by State Councils and year of establishment. Please note that some BB companies have been reorganised and reactivated after a period of being inactive or defunct. The original year of establishment for these companies are listed with their reactivation date in parentheses.

The list of BB companies in Malaysia, both current and inactive are:

=== Johor State Council ===
Company	Sponsoring Authority	Established	Notes	Affiliation
1st Batu Pahat	Grace Presbyterian Church	1999	Deactivated	Presbyterian
1st Johor Bahru	Holy Light Presbyterian Church	1956		Presbyterian
2nd Johor Bahru	True Blessing Church	1990	Amalgamated with 5th Johor Bahru	Independent
3rd Johor Bahru	Christian Gospel Centre	1997	Deactivated	Independent
4th Johor Bahru	Chen-Li Presbyterian Church	2004		Presbyterian
5th Johor Bahru	True Blessing Church	2015	Redesignated from 2nd JB	Independent
1st Kulai	St. Andrews Presbyterian Church	1959 (2005)	Deactivated from 1995 - 2004	Presbyterian
1st Kluang	Agape Presbyterian Church	1993		Presbyterian
2nd Kluang	Herald Presbyterian Church	1993		Presbyterian
1st Pontian	Hope Church Johor Bahru	2015		Independent
1st Muar	Trinity Presbyterian Church	2008		Presbyterian
1st Simpang Renggam	Gereja Presbyterian Gloria	1997		Presbyterian
1st Yong Peng	St. Stephen's Church	1989	Deactivated in 1995	Anglican (W. M'sia)
2nd Yong Peng	Gereja Presbyterian Yong Peng	1989	Deactivated in 1994	Presbyterian

=== Kuala Lumpur State Council (Companies in Negeri Sembilan and Pahang within jurisdiction) ===
Company	Sponsoring Authority	Established	Notes	Affiliation
1st Bentong (Pahang)	Chinese Methodist Church	1965	Deactivated	Methodist
1st Kuala Lumpur	Wesley Methodist Church	1954		Methodist
2nd Kuala Lumpur	Grace Methodist Church	1957		Methodist
3rd Kuala Lumpur	Young Men's Christian Association	1957		Para-church organisation
4th Kuala Lumpur	St Gabriel's Church, Sungai Besi	1960		Anglican (W. M'sia)
5th Kuala Lumpur	Christ Lutheran Church	1968	Deactivated in 1974	Lutheran (LCM)
6th Kuala Lumpur	Holy Light Lutheran Church	1981		Lutheran (LCM)
7th Kuala Lumpur	Christ Church	1989	Deactivated	Anglican (W. M'sia)
8th Kuala Lumpur	Faith Methodist Church	1990	Deactivated	Methodist
9th Kuala Lumpur	St. Mary's Cathedral	1991	Deactivated	Anglican (W. M'sia)
10th Kuala Lumpur	Full Gospel Assembly	1998		Independent
11th Kuala Lumpur	Revival City Street Church	1999	Deactivated in 2001	Independent
12th Kuala Lumpur	Wesley Methodist Church, Kepong	2006		Methodist
13th Kuala Lumpur	Faith Evangelical Free Church	2009		Evangelical Free Church
14th Kuala Lumpur	Kuala Lumpur Baptist Church, Bukit Bintang	2015		Baptist
15th Kuala Lumpur	Kuala Lumpur Baptist Church, Desa Parkcity	2015		Baptist
16th Kuala Lumpur	Kepong Chinese Methodist Church	2016		Methodist
17th Kuala Lumpur	Kepong Gospel Chapel	2016		Brethren
18th Kuala Lumpur	Setapak Gospel Centre	2017		Brethren
1st Kuantan (Pahang)	Wesley Methodist Church	1974	Deactivated in 1994	Methodist
1st Mentakab (Pahang)	Chinese Methodist Church	1993 (2004)	Deactivated from 2000 - 2003	Methodist
1st Negeri Sembilan	Bahau Chinese Methodist Church	1994	Deactivated	Methodist
1st Seremban (Negeri Sembilan)	Wesley Methodist School	1961 (2012)	Deactivated from 1971 - 2011	Methodist
2nd Seremban (Negeri Sembilan)	Taman Ujong Methodist Church	2016		Methodist
1st Raub (Pahang)	Wesley Methodist Church	N/A	Deactivated	Methodist

=== Melaka State Council ===
Company	Sponsoring Authority	Established	Notes	Affiliation
1st Melaka	Wesley Methodist Church	1962		Methodist
2nd Melaka	Chinese Methodist Church, Sungai Rambai	1992		Methodist
3rd Melaka	Chinese Methodist Church, Merlimau	1994		Methodist
4th Melaka	Chinese Methodist Church, Melaka	2008		Methodist

=== Penang State Council (Companies in Kedah and Kelantan within jurisdiction) ===
Company	Sponsoring Authority	Established	Notes	Affiliation
1st Alor Setar (Kedah)	Alor Setar Baptist Church	1966 (1994)	Deactivated in 1996	Baptist
1st Butterworth	St. Mark's Church	1954 (1998)	Deactivated from 1993 - 1998	Anglican (W. M'sia)
2nd Butterworth	Butterworth Gospel Hall	1994	Deactivated from 1974 - 1993	Brethren
3rd Butterworth	Chinese Methodist Church	1995		Methodist
4th Butterworth	True Light Baptist Church	1997	Deactivated	Baptist
1st Bukit Mertajam	Renewal Christian Church	2007		Independent
1st Kota Bharu (Kelantan)	Kelantan Presbyterian Church	1965	Deactivated in 1996	Presbyterian
2nd Kota Bharu (Kelantan)	Gereja Methodist Kota Bahru	1993	Deactivated in 1996	Methodist
3rd Kota Bharu (Kelantan)	St. Martin's Church	2000		Anglican (W. M'sia)
1st Nibong Tebal	Methodist English School	1960	Deactivated in 1974	Methodist
2nd Nibong Tebal	Holy Trinity Church	N/A	Deactivated	Anglican (W. M'sia)
1st Penang	Trinity Methodist Church	1946		Methodist
2nd Penang	Wesley Methodist Church	1952		Methodist
3rd Penang	Methodist Boys' School	1957	Amalgamated with 2nd Penang	Methodist
4th Penang	Tamil Methodist Church	1957	Deactivated in 1998	Methodist
5th Penang	Methodist High School	1958	Deactivated	Methodist
6th Penang	Cantonese Methodist Church	1969		Methodist
7th Penang	St. Andrew's Presbyterian Church	1970	Deactivated	Presbyterian
8th Penang	Chinese Methodist Church, Ayer Itam	1982		Methodist
9th Penang	Reservoir Garden Baptist Church	1990	Deactivated in 1994	Baptist
10th Penang	Penang Baptist Church	1989	Deactivated in 1998	Baptist
11th Penang	McCallum Street Baptist Church	1991	Deactivated in 1997	Baptist
12th Penang	Madras Lane Chinese Methodist Church	1991	Deactivated in 1999	Methodist
13th Penang	True Light Baptist Church	1992	Deactivated in 1999	Baptist
14th Penang	Full Gospel Tabernacle	1992		Independent
15th Penang	Cantonese Methodist Church	1992		Methodist
16th Penang	First Assembly of God (Chinese)	1997		Assemblies of God
17th Penang	Permata Baptist Centre	2004		Baptist
18th Penang	Penang First Assembly of God; St. Xavier's Institution; Penang Free School	2004		Assemblies of God; Roman Catholic (Penang); Anglican (W. M'sia)
19th Penang	Grace Assembly of God	2007		Assemblies of God
20th Penang	Sekolah Sri Pelita	2011		Independent
21st Penang	FGA Centre	2011		Independent
1st Perai	Agape Baptist Church	1993		Baptist
1st Sungai Petani (Kedah)	Tamil Methodist Church	1960	Deactivated	Methodist
2nd Sungai Petani (Kedah)	Chinese Methodist Church	1995	Deactivated in 1999	Methodist
3rd Sungai Petani (Kedah)	Grace Community Centre	2006		Church of God of Prophecy
4th Sungai Petani (Kedah)	Patani Baptist Church	2017		Baptist

=== Perak State Council ===
Company	Sponsoring Authority	Established	Notes	Affiliation
1st Ipoh	Anglo-Chinese School	1958 (1991)		Methodist
2nd Ipoh	Bercham Christian Church	1958	Deactivated	CNEC
3rd Ipoh	Church of the Holy Spirit	1971	Deactivated in 1974	Anglican (W. M'sia)
4th Ipoh	Canning Garden Baptist Church	1986	Deactivated	Baptist
5th Ipoh	Holy Trinity Lutheran Church	1987	Deactivated	Lutheran (LCM)
6th Ipoh	Wesley Methodist School	2011		Methodist
7th Ipoh	Grace Lutheran Church, Menglembu	2011		Lutheran (LCM)
8th Ipoh	St. Michael's Institution	2016		Roman Catholic (Penang)
1st Kampar	Anglo-Chinese School	1962	Amalgamated with 2nd Kampar	Methodist
2nd Kampar	Wesley Methodist Church	1968		Methodist
3rd Kampar	Wesley Methodist Church	1989	Amalgamated with 2nd Kampar	Methodist
4th Kampar	Chinese Methodist Church	1996		Methodist
1st Manjung	Trinity Methodist Church, Sitiawan	1995		Methodist
2nd Manjung	Chin Hock Methodist Church	1995		Methodist
3rd Manjung	Chinese Methodist Church	2000		Methodist
4th Manjung	Wesley Methodist Church	2010		Methodist
1st Parit Buntar	Methodist English School	1966	Deactivated	Methodist
1st Pengkalan Hulu	Pengkalan Hulu Lutheran Church	2011		Lutheran (LCM)
1st Taiping	Wesley Methodist Church	1959 (2002)		Methodist
1st Tanjung Malim	Methodist English School	1963	Deactivated in 1973	Methodist
1st Teluk Intan	Wesley Methodist Church	1958		Methodist

=== Sabah State Council (Companies in Labuan within jurisdiction) ===
Company	Sponsoring Authority	Established	Notes	Affiliation
1st Keningau	Keningau Baptist Church	2008		Baptist
1st Kota Kinabalu	Young Men's Christian Association	1967	Amalgamated with 3rd Kota Kinabalu	Para-church organisation
2nd Kota Kinabalu	Kota Kinabalu Basel Christian Church	1974		Lutheran (Basel)
3rd Kota Kinabalu	All Saints' Cathedral	1978	Redesignated from 1st Kota Kinabalu	Anglican (Sabah)
4th Kota Kinabalu	Sacred Heart Cathedral	1982		Roman Catholic (Kota Kinabalu)
5th Kota Kinabalu	Good Samaritan Church	1985 (2005)	Deactivated from 1995 - 2004	Anglican (Sabah)
6th Kota Kinabalu	Menggatal Basel Christian Church	N/A	Deactivated in 1996	Lutheran (Basel)
7th Kota Kinabalu	Penampang Basel Christian Church	N/A	Deactivated in 1995	Lutheran (Basel)
8th Kota Kinabalu	Christ Church, Likas	1994	Deactivated	Anglican (Sabah)
9th Kota Kinabalu	Shern En Methodist Church	2001		Methodist
10th Kota Kinabalu	Kota Kinabalu Baptist Church	2006		Baptist
11th Kota Kinabalu	Stella Maris Church, Tanjung Aru	2014		Roman Catholic (Kota Kinabalu)
12th Kota Kinabalu	Petros City Church	2014		Independent
13th Kota Kinabalu	St. Simon's Church, Likas	2016		Roman Catholic (Kota Kinabalu)
1st Labuan	Church of our Holy Saviour	N/A	Deactivated in 1998	Anglican (Sabah)
1st Lahad Datu	Lahad Datu Basel Christian Church	N/A	Deactivated in 2001	Lutheran (Basel)
2nd Lahad Datu	Xuan En Methodist Church	2001		Methodist
1st Penampang	Song En Methodist Church	2002		Methodist
1st Sandakan	St. Michael's and All Angels Church	1982		Anglican (Sabah)
2nd Sandakan	Sandakan Basel Christian Church	1985		Lutheran (Basel)
3rd Sandakan	Sandakan Baptist Church	1985	Deactivated in 1993	Baptist
4th Sandakan	St. Mary's Cathedral	1985	Deactivated in 1996	Roman Catholic (Sandakan)
5th Sandakan	Church of the Good Shepherd	1989		Anglican (Sabah)
1st Tamparuli	Tamparuli Basel Christian Church	1993		Lutheran (Basel)
1st Tawau	Sri Tanjung Baptist Church	1985		Baptist
2nd Tawau	St. Patrick's Church	1985 (2005)	Deactivated from 1994 - 2004	Anglican (Sabah)
3rd Tawau	Tawau Basel Christian Church	1989		Lutheran (Basel)
4th Tawau	Calvary City Church	1993	Deactivated in 1998	Assemblies of God
5th Tawau	Holy Trinity Church	2024		Roman Catholic (Sandakan)

=== Sarawak State Council ===
Company	Sponsoring Authority	Established	Notes	Affiliation
1st Beluru	BEM (SIB) Pekan Beluru	2016		Sidang Injil Borneo
1st Binatang (Bintangor)	Church of Christ the King	1974	Deactivated	Roman Catholic (Sibu)
2nd Bintangor	Kai Nguong Methodist Church	1979		Methodist
3rd Bintangor	Lai Ang Methodist Church	2008		Methodist
1st Bintulu	Eng Kwang Methodist Church	2002		Methodist
2nd Bintulu	Ming Ong Methodist Church	2005		Methodist
3rd Bintulu	St. Thomas' Church	2010	Deactivated	Anglican (Kuching)
4th Bintulu	Gloria Methodist Church	2015		Methodist
1st Julau	Julau Methodist Church	1976	Deactivated	Methodist
1st Kapit	Kapit Methodist Church	1974	Deactivated	Methodist
1st Kuching	St. Thomas' Cathedral	1961		Anglican (Kuching)
2nd Kuching	Trinity Methodist Church	1967		Methodist
3rd Kuching	St. Faith's Church	1971 (1993)	Deactivated from 1977 - 1992	Anglican (Kuching)
4th Kuching	Faith Methodist Church	1987		Methodist
5th Kuching	St. Basil's Church	1993		Anglican (Kuching)
6th Kuching	Ching Kwong Methodist Church	1999		Methodist
7th Kuching	Chin Daw Methodist Church	2004		Methodist
8th Kuching	Chin Fu Methodist Church	2006		Methodist
9th Kuching	SIB The Way Church	2009		Sidang Injil Borneo
10th Kuching	Gereja Baptis Pertama	2015		Baptist
11th Kuching	Blessed Sacrament Church	2018		Roman Catholic (Kuching)
12th Kuching	Siong Tau Methodist Church	2019		Methodist
16th Kuching	St. Joseph's Cathedral	2022		Roman Catholic (Kuching)
1st Limbang	Ling Kwong Methodist Church	2004		Methodist
1st Marudi (Baram)	Marudi Methodist Church	1974	Deactivated	Methodist
1st Miri	St. Columba's Church	1984	Deactivated from 1974 - 1983	Anglican (Kuching)
2nd Miri	Hwai En Methodist Church	1997		Methodist
3rd Miri	Mei Ann Methodist Church	2002		Methodist
4th Miri	Grace Methodist Church	2002		Methodist
5th Miri	Gan En Methodist Church	2002		Methodist
1st Mukah	Mukah Methodist Church	2004		Methodist
1st Sarikei	Methodist Town Church	1969		Methodist
2nd Sarikei	Bee Eng Methodist Church	1997	Deactivated in 1998	Methodist
3rd Sarikei	Nyelong Park Methodist Church	2002		Methodist
4th Sarikei	BEM (SIB) Charis	2013		Sidang Injil Borneo
1st Sibu	Wesley Methodist Church	1968		Methodist
2nd Sibu	Xin Fu Yuan Methodist Church	1993		Methodist
3rd Sibu	Zion Methodist Church	1993		Methodist
4th Sibu	Hwai Ang Methodist Church	1995		Methodist
5th Sibu	Tien Tao Methodist Church	1996		Methodist
6th Sibu	Masland Methodist Church	1999		Methodist
7th Sibu	Sing Ang Tong Methodist Church	1999		Methodist
8th Sibu	Tien En Methodist Church	2000		Methodist
9th Sibu	BEM (SIB) Hosanna	2002		Sidang Injil Borneo
10th Sibu	Logos Methodist Church	2003		Methodist
11th Sibu	Shiuan En Methodist Church	2010		Methodist
12th Sibu	Jaya Methodist Church	2017		Methodist
1st Simanggang (Sri Aman)	St Luke's Church	1969	Deactivated	Anglican (Kuching)
1st Sri Aman	Sing Ing Methodist Church	1999		Methodist

=== Selangor State Council ===
Company	Sponsoring Authority	Established	Notes	Affiliation
1st Ampang Jaya	Chinese Methodist Church	2000		Methodist
2nd Ampang Jaya	The Abundant Church	2010		Assemblies of God
1st Banting	Methodist English School	1958	Deactivated in 1974	Methodist
1st Kajang	9th Mile Cheras Lutheran Church	1970		Lutheran (LCM)
2nd Kajang	Canaan Lutheran Church	1995	Deactivated in 1996	Lutheran (LCM)
3rd Kajang	11th Mile Cheras Lutheran Church	1975 (2004)	Deactivated from 1998 - 2003	Lutheran (LCM)
4th Kajang	Kajang Life Chapel	1996		Brethren
1st Klang	Wesley Methodist Church	1963 (1996)	Deactivated from ???? - 1995	Methodist
2nd Klang	Young Men's Christian Association	1987	Deactivated	Para-church Organisation
1st Kota Kemuning	Community Baptist Church	2012		Baptist
1st Petaling Jaya	Trinity Methodist Church	1959 (1983)	Deactivated from 1979 - 1982	Methodist
2nd Petaling Jaya	Luther House Chapel	1979	Deactivated in 1985	Lutheran (LCM)
3rd Petaling Jaya	St. Paul's Church	1984	Deactivated in 2010	Anglican (W. M'sia)
4th Petaling Jaya	Emmanuel Baptist Church	2006		Baptist
5th Petaling Jaya	Renewal Lutheran Church	2012		Lutheran (Independent)
6th Petaling Jaya	Nobel International School	2013		Baptist
7th Petaling Jaya	Emmanuel Methodist Church	2013		Methodist
8th Petaling Jaya	Pantai Baptist Church	2014		Baptist
9th Petaling Jaya	Damansara Utama Methodist Church	2016		Methodist
1st Port Swettenham (P. Klang)	Methodist Boys' School	N/A	Deactivated in 1973	Methodist
1st Puchong	Community Baptist Church	2007		Baptist
2nd Puchong	Logos Presbyterian Church	2016		Presbyterian
1st Rawang	Rawang Christian Church	2007		Independent
1st Sekinchan	Chinese Methodist Church	1993	Deactivated in 1997	Methodist
1st Sepang	Chinese Methodist Church	2000		Methodist
1st Serdang	Kajang Chinese Methodist Church	2008-2022/2023-current		Methodist
1st Subang Jaya	Church of the Good Shepherd	2000	Deactivated in 2001	Anglican (W. M'sia)
2nd Subang Jaya	First Baptist Church	2000		Baptist
3rd Subang Jaya	City Harvest Church	2014		Charismatic
1st Tanjung Sepat	Chinese Methodist Church	1991	Deactivated	Methodist

== See also ==
- Boys' Brigade
- Girls' Brigade

== Sources ==
- Senior Section Handbook, Fifth Edition. Malaysia: The Boys' Brigade in Malaysia. 2003.
- (2003) Berita Anchor, October 2003. Malaysia: The Boys' Brigade in Malaysia.
