= Evangelical Free Church of Singapore =

Credit & Source for EFCS Logo: Evangelical Free Church of Singapore

The Evangelical Free Church of Singapore (EFCS) is a national denominational coordinating body for the Evangelical Free Churches (EFC) in Singapore, which are churches that are congregationalist in polity. These churches share common heritage and Christian beliefs. However, each individual local church is self-governing as a congregational church with its own church board or council. EFCS was established in 1961. It was registered as a charity in 1985. Concurrently, evangelical free churches were also established in Malaysia from 1963. They eventually became the Evangelical Free Church of Malaysia, after Singapore and Malaysia became separate countries in 1965.

== Origin and Theological Affiliation ==
Following the Reformation, parts of Europe began adopting Protestantism in their national or state church. Later in Europe, Pietism and revival emerge with emphasis on the individual's personal Christian faith and piety. This led to the rise of free churches in Sweden, Norway, Denmark and other countries. These churches were autonomous, congregational in polity, and "free" from state churches and state control. "Evangelical" as in the "evangelical free" church name shows their emphases on the Bible (sola scriptura), Gospel and personal faith.

Subsequently, as Scandinavians emigrated to America, they brought their Christian faith and congregationalist polity to churches they founded. This gave rise to the Swedish and Danish-Norwegian Evangelical Free Churches.

Eventually, the merger of these two churches in 1950 led to the founding of the Evangelical Free Church of America (EFCA), which established the Trinity International University in Deerfield, Illinois, and Trinity Western University in British Columbia. The former includes Trinity Evangelical Divinity School (TEDS), a theological seminary with professors such as D. A. Carson, Walter Kaiser Jr., Wayne Grudem, Walter L. Liefeld and others.

With its strong missions emphasis, EFCA then sent its missionaries to Singapore in the late 1950s.

== History in Singapore ==
In 1957, the first missionaries from EFCA arrived in Singapore. They were Arthur Linquist and his wife Annie. They were joined in 1960 by Eric McMurray and his wife Dorothy, and by Benjamin Sawatsky and his wife Muriel.

In 1961, Bethany Evangelical Free Church became the first evangelical free church to be established in Singapore. This was soon followed in 1964 by the Bukit Timah Evangelical Free Church, now known as Woodlands EFC. In the 1970s, one of the churches, Covenant Evangelical Free Church, emerged and eventually became one of the larger churches in Singapore with several thousand Christians worshipping in three locations.

In over 60 years, more churches became part of the EFCS. It is now a denomination among other national Evangelical Free Church denominations in several countries, which share common roots, heritage, and beliefs but are self-governing. These national bodies include EFC America, EFC Canada, EFC China (Hong Kong), EFC Japan, EFC Malaysia, and EFC Philippines.

== Evangelical Free Churches in Singapore ==
There are 11 Evangelical Free Churches in Singapore, which are also members of the National Council of Churches of Singapore (NCSS):

- Bethany Evangelical Free Church
- Charis Evangelical Free Church
- Covenant Evangelical Free Church
- Ebenezer Evangelical Free Church
- Emmanuel Evangelical Free Church
- Emmaus Evangelical Free Church
- Family of Grace Evangelical Free Church
- Geylang Evangelical Free Church
- Praise Evangelical Free Church
- S-Word Evangelical Free Church
- Woodlands Evangelical Free Church
