= Founder's Award =

Founder's Award, Founders' Award, or Founders Award may refer to any number of awards associated with an organization's founder or founders. These include:

- American Statistical Association Founders Award
- International Emmy: Founders Award
- Google Founders' Award
- Founder's Badge (Boys' Brigade in Malaysia)
- For the Order of the Arrow Founder's Award, see Honors and awards of the Order of the Arrow#Founder's Award
- For the Theater Hall of Fame Founders Award, see American Theatre Hall of Fame#Founders Award
- Founder's award of Women in Film Crystal + Lucy Awards
