= Evangelical Free Church of Malaysia =

- Logo of the Evangelical Free Church of Malaysia
- Classification: Protestant
- Orientation: Evangelical
- Polity: Congregationalist
- Associations: National Evangelical Christian Fellowship
- Region: Malaysia
- Origin: 1963
- Branched from: Evangelical Free Church of Canada
- Congregations: 12
- Official website: www.efcmalaysia.org

The Evangelical Free Church of Malaysia or EFCM is an Evangelical Christian denomination that first started work in Malaysia in 1963.

== History ==
EFCM planted its first church in Malacca as a result of door to door evangelism work of two missionaries from the Evangelical Free Church of Canada, Eric McMurray and Ben Sawatsky together with a missionary from the Woodlands Evangelical Free Church in Singapore. The Malacca Evangelical Free Church held its first worship service in a rented government building on 17 November 1963.

The EFCM expanded to the Malaysian capital in 1967 when a new church was established in Petaling Jaya, which was then a suburb of Kuala Lumpur, at the initiative of McMurray and Sawatsky. A third church was added in 1969 when an Overseas Missionary Fellowship established congregation, Emmanuel Christian Centre, joined the EFCM and was renamed Emmanuel Evangelical Free Church.

A fourth church was planted in Overseas Union Garden, a suburb closer to the city centre in 1974 and in 1978 the EFCM was formally registered as a society with the government.

Today, the EFCM has 12 member churches in Malacca, the Klang Valley, and Seremban.

== Beliefs and practices ==
Historically, the Evangelical Free Churches were Lutheran in theology and background but explicitly rejected state control but this has evolved today to a broadly Evangelical movement that is free from ecclesiastical control. This is expressed in the nature and function of the EFCM which operates as a national coordinating body without authority over the local churches.

In its Statement of faith, EFCM affirms the absolute authority and inerrancy of the Bible for all Christian faith and practice, the Trinitarian nature of God; atonement in the sacrificial death of Jesus Christ and his resurrection; original sin; Christ as head of the church and the local church's right to self government; the personal, premillennial, and imminent return of Christ; the bodily resurrection of the dead; and the two ordinances of water baptism and the Lord's Supper. In addition, the EFCM also claims the following characteristics or distinctives:

1. Evangelical - committed to the essence of the Gospel as affirmed in their Statement of faith
2. Free - asserts the autonomy and independence of the local church, and the liberty of the individual believer to adhere to aspects of the faith which does not affect one's salvation
3. Reformed & Pietistic - values both the rational and relational, i.e. to have a clear head when it comes to doctrine and a warm heart when it comes to devotion
4. Inclusive - membership consists of those who have a personal faith in Jesus Christ but does not exclude those who are not baptised, not confirmed or in complete agreement with every point of doctrine
5. Congregational - affirms the right of each local church to govern its own affairs free from ecclesiastical control as the best expression of the priesthood of all believers
6. Ecumenical - passionately believes in the unity of all believers and is willing to join Christians of other traditions in accomplishing the Great Commission while preserving their distinctives

== Affiliations ==
The individual EFCM member churches participates in ecumenical relationships through:

- National Evangelical Christian Fellowship
  - Christian Federation of Malaysia
  - Evangelical Fellowship of Asia
  - World Evangelical Alliance

== See also ==
- Christianity in Malaysia
