= MBTS =

MBTS may refer to:

- Malaysia Baptist Theological Seminary in Malaysia
- Midwestern Baptist Theological Seminary in the United States
