= Christianity in Malaysia =

Malaysian Christians
(Malay: Orang Kristian Malaysia)
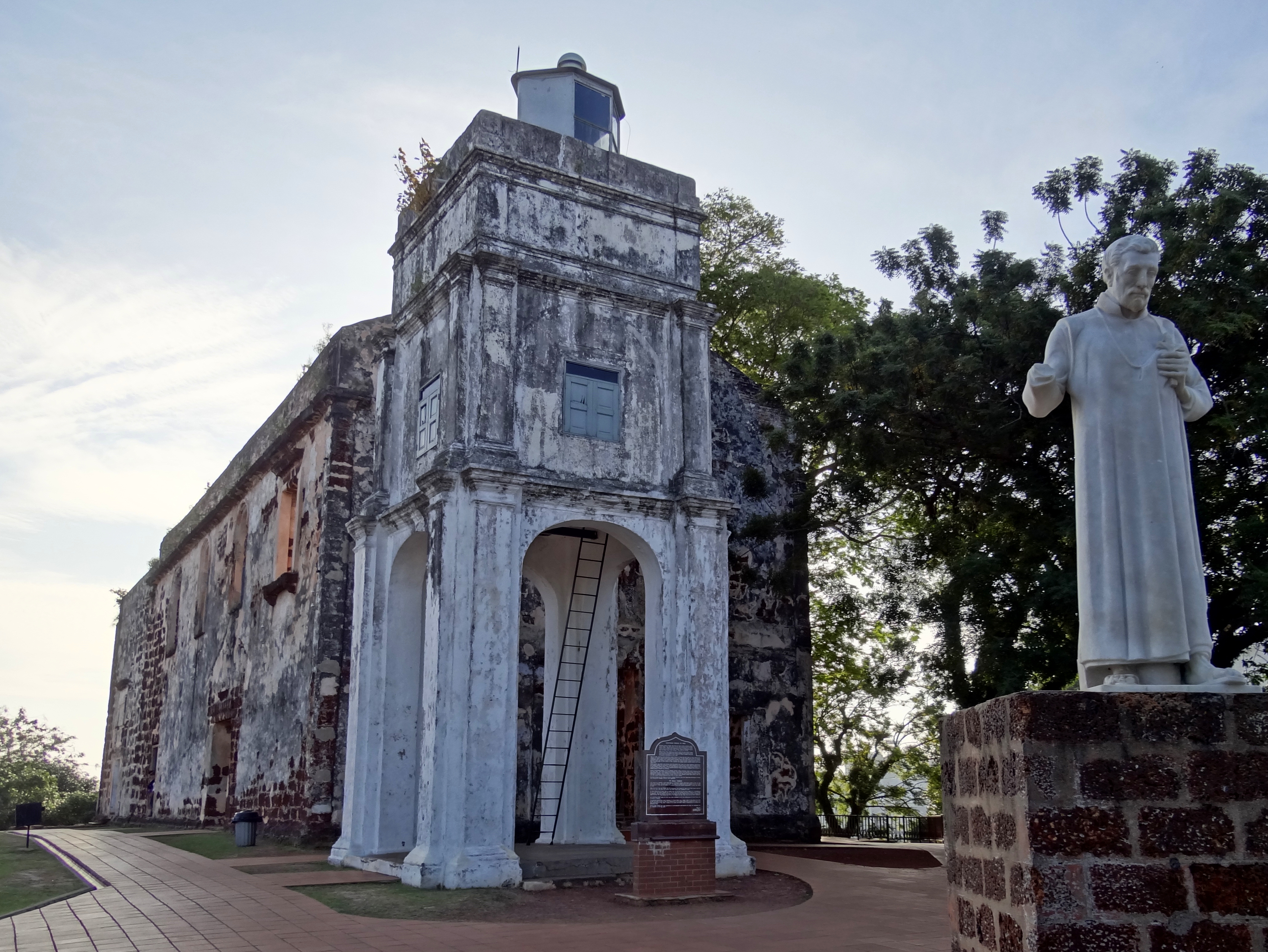
- St. Paul's Church, Malacca, Malaysia

Total population
- 2,941,049 (2020 census)

Regions with significant populations
- Sabah · Sarawak · Peninsular Malaysia

Languages
- Malay · English; Bornean languages · Chinese · Indian

Religion
- Catholicism (50%) · Protestantism (40%) · Oriental Orthodoxy · Eastern Orthodoxy

Concentration of Christian populations in Malaysia according to the 2020 census

Christianity is the third-largest religion in Malaysia. In the 2020 census, 9.1% of the Malaysian population identified themselves as Christians. About two-thirds of Malaysia's Christian population lives in East Malaysia, in the states of Sabah and Sarawak. Adherents of Christianity represent a majority (50.1%) of the population in Sarawak, which is Malaysia's largest state by land area. Christianity is one of four major religions, including Islam, Hinduism, and Buddhism, that are protected by Malaysian law, especially in East Malaysia.

In 2020, half of Malaysian Christians were Catholic, 40% were Protestant and 10% belonged to other denominations.

In 2008, the major Christian denominations in the country included Catholics, Anglicans (represented by the Church of the Province of South East Asia, which also covers Anglicans in Singapore and Brunei), Baptists, Brethren, non-denominational churches, independent Charismatic churches, Lutherans, Methodists, Presbyterians and Sidang Injil Borneo.

== History ==
Early Christian presence in the Malay Archipelago can be traced to Persian and Turkic traders with Nestorian origins from as early as the 7th century and to early Arab Christian, Persian and Nestorian traders in Malacca prior to the Portuguese conquest in 1511. The British acquired Penang in 1786, and in 1795 took over Malacca, which had been conquered by the Dutch in 1641. Catholic priests from Thailand established the Major Seminary in Penang in 1810. The LMS was based in Malacca and Penang from 1815, but most Protestant missions collapsed after 1842 when it became possible to enter China. Catholic leadership remained, but was divided between Portuguese and French. Open Brethren ministry dates from 1860 and Methodist from 1885. Presbyterianism grew through Chinese churches in Johore and expatriate congregations in Penang, Ipoh and Kuala Lumpur. Mission to Sengoi indigenous people began in 1932. Pentecostalism became a larger influence through the Charismatic Movement of the 1970s, but North American and Ceylon Pentecostal Mission missionaries (Pentecostal Church of Malaysia) had been active from 1935.

Anglicanism and Catholicism came to North Borneo in 1882 after the establishment of British North Borneo, albeit there were earlier attempts such as the Catholic mission led by a Spanish mariner turned priest, Carlos Cuarteroni in 1857 in Labuan, with stations established in Brunei and Looc Porin (now Kota Kinabalu), however with lesser success. A more extensive missionary movement, for example the Catholic Mill Hill Missionaries started in 1882, focused mainly on the Chinese and indigenous communities, such as the Kadazan-Dusun people. Migration was also an important factor in the spread of Christianity. The Basel Mission also worked in Sabah in 1882 among migrant Hakka Chinese, many of whom were Christian. Tamil migrants to Malaya included Catholics, Lutherans, Anglicans, and Methodists. Migration increased after the Boxer Rebellion, particularly to Sitiawan and Sibu, still strong Chinese Methodist centres. Mar Thoma and Syriac Orthodox Churches were established in the 1930s following migration from the Kerala Coast of India.

In Sarawak the rule of Rajah Brooke included support for an Anglican ministry from 1847 and Catholics were later admitted. In 1928 the Australian Borneo Evangelical Mission began work with modest resources which nevertheless resulted in the largest indigenous church in Malaysia today, the Sidang Injil Borneo (Borneo Evangelical Church).

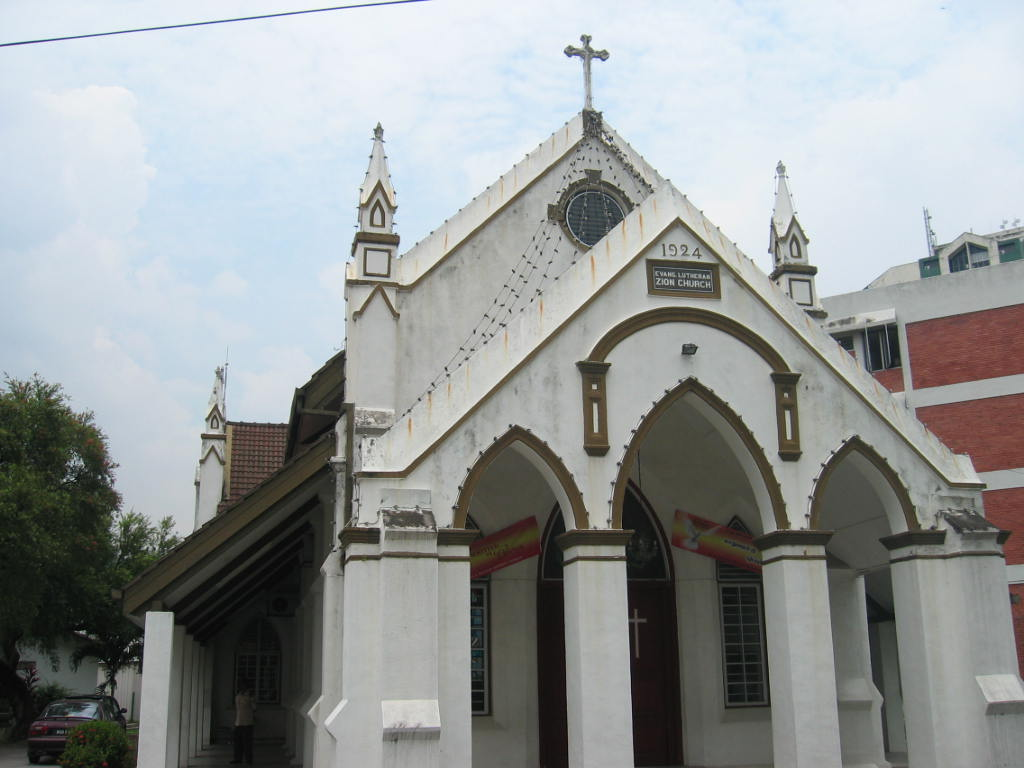
Evangelical Lutheran Zion Church in Brickfields, Kuala Lumpur, established in 1924.

World War II saw the removal of expatriate leadership and a path towards an indigenous church was more clearly set. The Malayan Christian Council (MCC), founded in 1948, coordinated mission groups during the Malayan Emergency. Chinese relocated into 'New Villages' were served by missionaries, sometimes ex-China, who worked alongside local Christians in social and medical work. However, after independence in 1957, many churches were overdependent on expatriates. In the 1970s churches developed structures independent of Singapore as well as of overseas support. Recent growth in independent churches is another sign of a desire to establish a Malaysian Christian identity.

Christian commitment to education has been strong through Anglican, Catholic and Methodist schools, now part of the government education system. Social concern is expressed through medical work, and organisations such as Malaysian CARE. The Salvation Army and YMCA/YWCAs make distinctive contributions.

Since 1983 the National Evangelical Christian Fellowship (NECF) has provided a focus for evangelical and independent congregations. The Christian Federation of Malaysia incorporating the Christian Council of Malaysia (formerly MCC), Catholics, and the NECF was formed in 1986. The Sabah Council of Churches and Association of Churches of Sarawak fulfil similar functions in East Malaysia.

Malaysia is a multi-religious context where Western theological preoccupations are not always relevant. Lay leadership has developed strongly in most churches. Although there are many challenges through changing political and economic circumstances, like Malaysia itself, the churches are beginning to see that they have a contribution to make on a larger stage.

== Church buildings ==
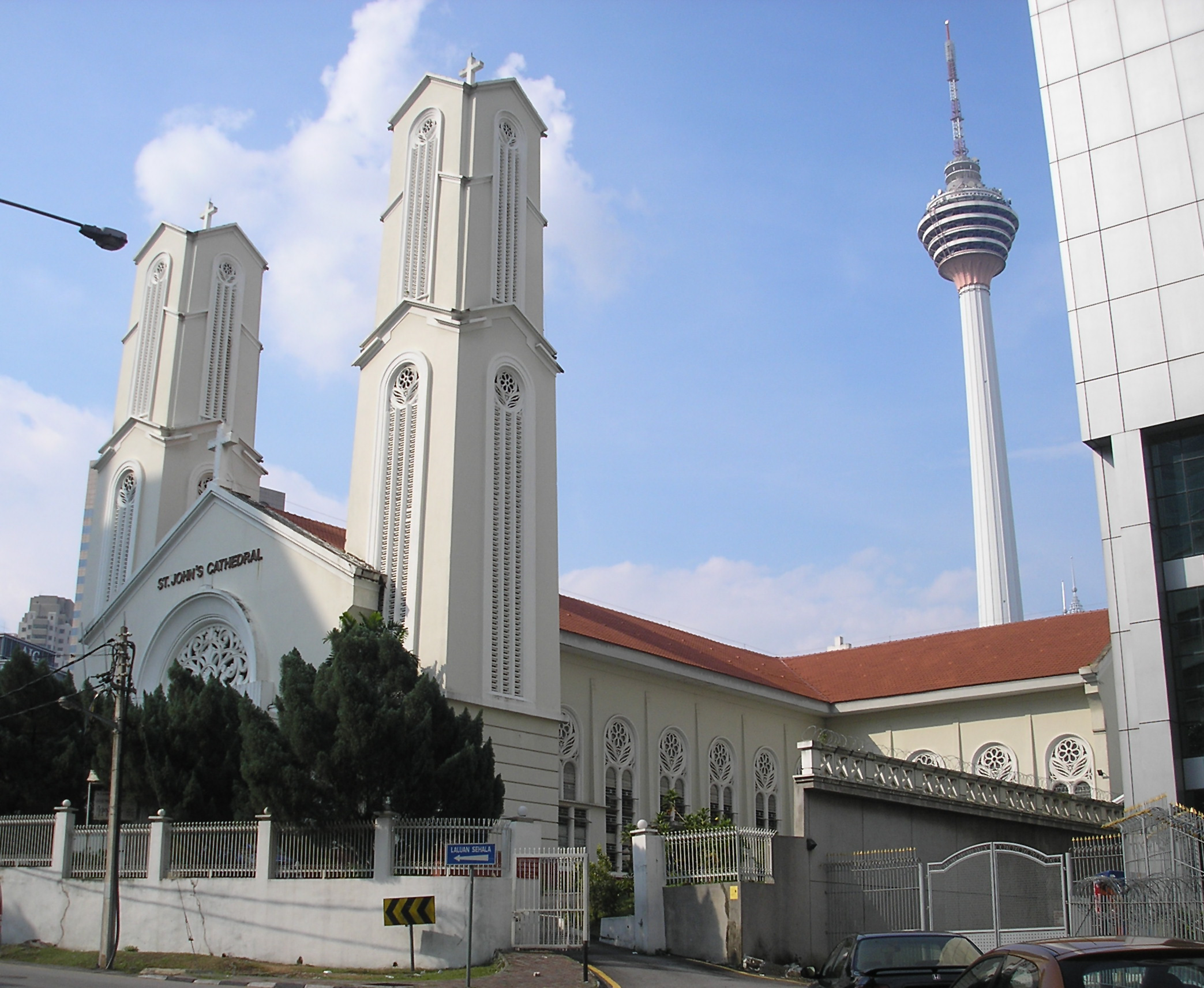
St. John's Cathedral in Kuala Lumpur

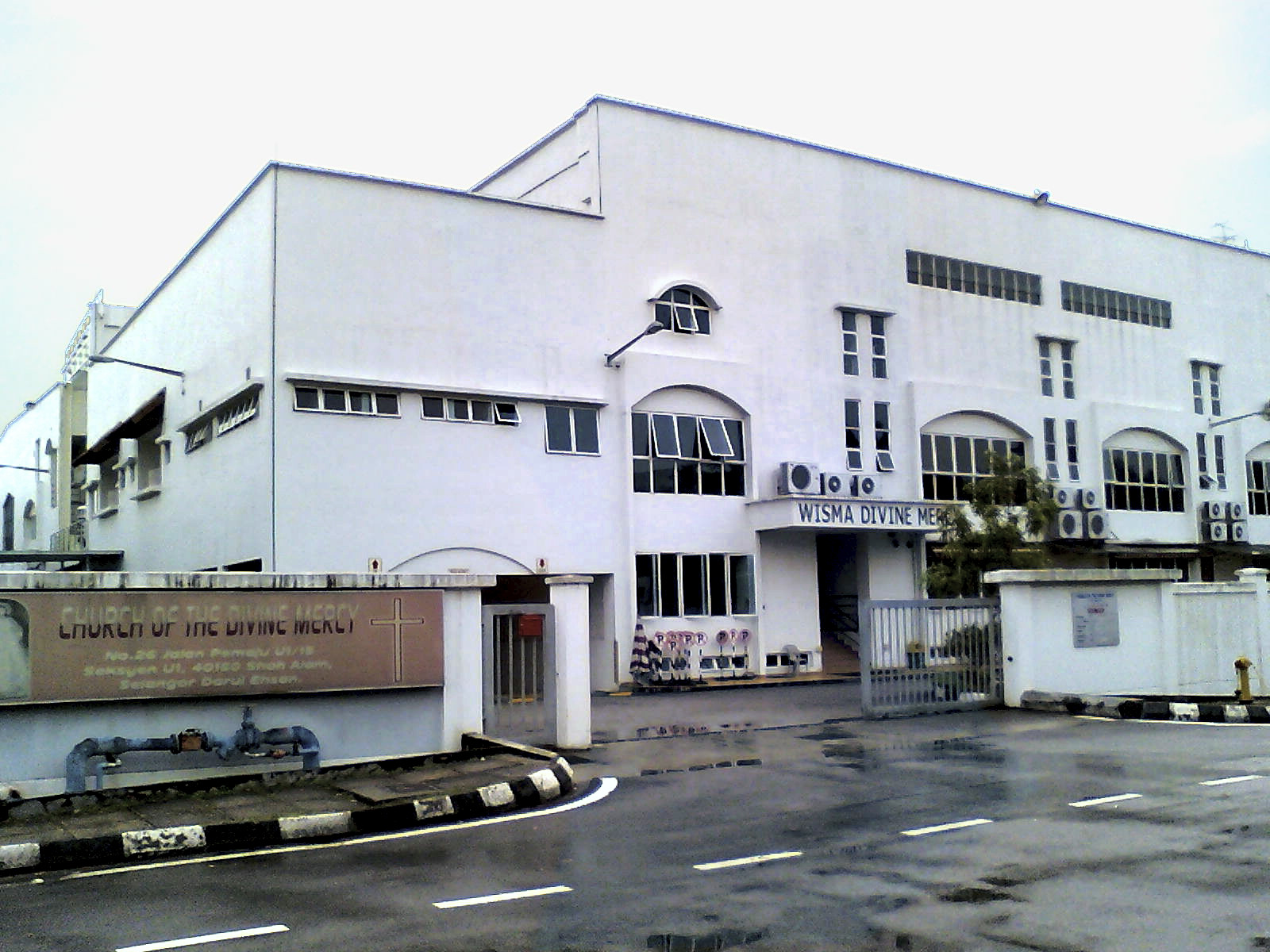
Church of the Divine Mercy in Shah Alam. The church was built in an industrial area.

Churches are allowed in Malaysia, though there are restrictions on construction of new churches due to zoning laws. No pre-existing churches have been closed down by the government and no standing congregations have been disbanded. However, it is difficult to build new churches. For instance, it took more than twenty years for the local council in Shah Alam to allow a church to be built there, with an additional condition that the church must look like a factory and not a more conventional church appearance. However, new churches are allowed and easy to apply for in East Malaysia due to the 67.9% of people living in East Malaysia being Christians. Most of the time, new churches are started in a clandestine manner as ordinary businesses in shops, especially in major cities like Kuala Lumpur.

Some of Malaysia's notable current churches include St. John's Cathedral in Kuala Lumpur, St. Joseph's Cathedral in Kuching, Sacred Heart Cathedral in Kota Kinabalu, St. Michael's Church in Penampang and Christ Church in Malacca City.

== Evangelism ==
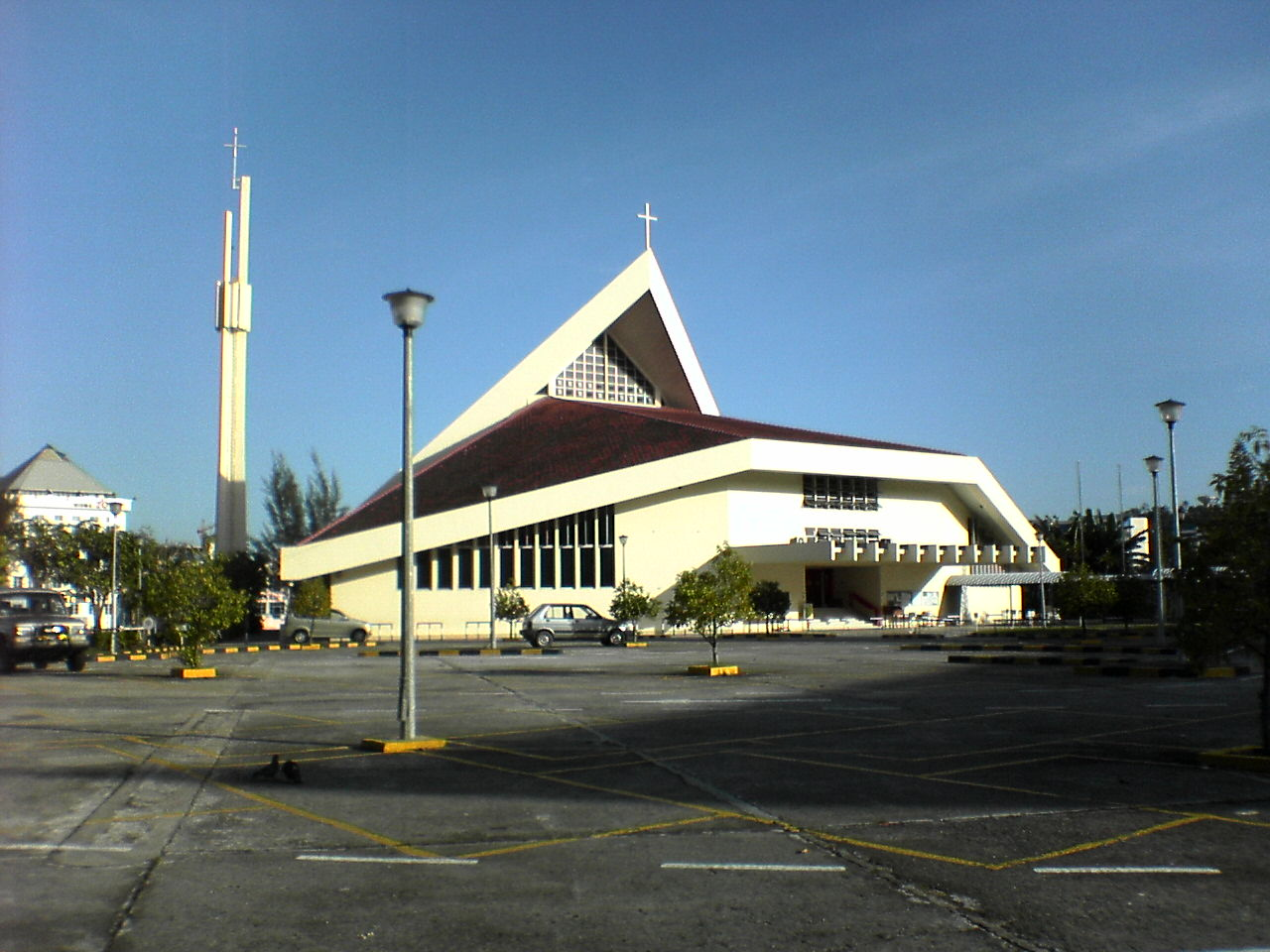
Sacred Heart Cathedral in Kota Kinabalu, Sabah.

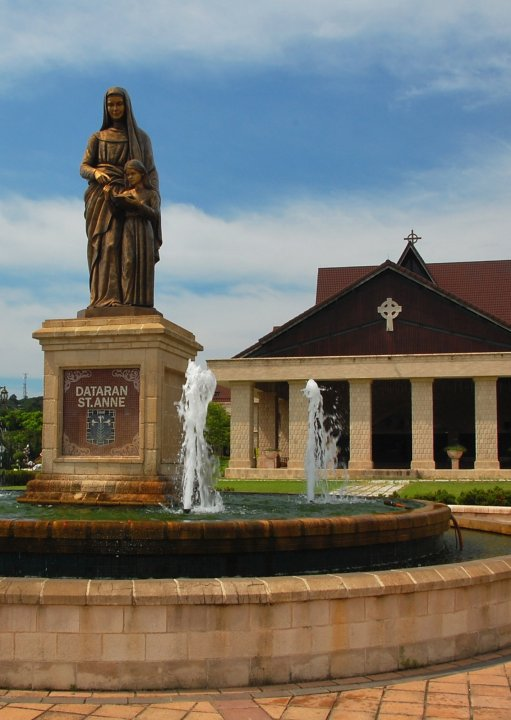
St. Anne's Church in Bukit Mertajam, Penang.

The freedom to practice and propagate religion is guaranteed under the Article 11 of the Constitution of Malaysia and this is generally respected. The Constitution however allows for the restriction of the propagation of religions other than Islam to the Muslim community and the ambiguity of these provisions has resulted in some problems.

It has been the practice of the church in Malaysia to not actively proselytise to the Muslim community. Christian literature are required by law to carry a caption "for non-Muslims only". Article 11(4) of the Federal Constitution of Malaysia allows the states to prohibit the propagation of other religions to Muslims, and most (with the exception of Penang, Sabah, Sarawak and the Federal Territories) have done so. There is no well researched agreement on the actual number of Malaysian Muslim converts to Christianity in Malaysia. According to the latest population census released by the Malaysian Statistics Department, there are none, according to Ustaz Ridhuan Tee, there are 135 and according to Tan Sri Dr Harussani Zakaria, there are 260,000. See also Status of religious freedom in Malaysia.

There are, however, cases in which a Muslim will adopt the Christian faith without declaring his/her apostasy (in the eyes of Islamic authorities) openly. In effect, they are practising Christians, but legally Muslims.

Muslims showing interest in the Christian faith or other faith practices not considered orthodox by state religious authorities are usually sent either by the police or their family members to state funded Faith Rehabilitation Centres (Malay: Pusat Pemulihan Akidah) where they are counselled to remain faithful to Islam and some states have provisions for penalties under their respective Shariah legislations for apostasy from Islam.

== Bible translation and literature ==
Portions of the Bible had been translated into the Malay language as early as 1612 and were also published in the Netherlands in 1629. The Malay language was one of the first Eastern Asian languages to have the Bible translated. Due to the linguistic and cultural similarities of both Malaysia and Indonesia, a lot of early language and literature work was shared by the two territories and the legacy remains today.

As a Muslim majority country, opinions on whether the Indonesian-language Bible and Malay-language Bible, both known by the name Alkitab, should be banned, are polarised. The word rendered 'Lord' in English translations is given in Malay as 'Tuhan' while the word 'God' in English is translated as 'Allah'. It was claimed that there is no closer translation from the original Hebrew since both Arabic and the Hebrew word for God come from the same Semitic root, and Arabic-speaking Christians and Maltese-speaking Christians also use the word 'Allah' for God.

Other Christian materials in the Malay language have been banned at various times for similar reason. However, Abdullah Ahmad Badawi, Prime Minister of Malaysia, clarified in April 2005 that there was no ban on Bibles translated into Malay, although they are required to be stamped with a "Not for Muslims" disclaimer.

A lawsuit was filed by the Archdiocese of Kuala Lumpur against the Government of Malaysia at the High Court of Malaya to seek a declaratory relief that the archdiocesan newspaper, The Herald, was entitled to use the word Allah and that the word should not exclusive to Islam.

The Iban Bible named Bup Kudus was also banned for using the term Allah Taala for God. Eventually, it was explained to the government that there was no other comparable term in Iban. As such, the ban was not enforced further, although neither was it officially repealed. The ban was later lifted only for usage by the Iban people, after protests from various Christian leaders.

== Education ==
Christian Missionary schools are part of education system in Malaysia today and administered by Ministry of Education with little interference by the churches where they belong to. Missionary schools are partially government-funded while teachers and administration staff are provided by the government. Most of the missionary schools were constructed before Malaysia was formed. Christian religious symbols such as crucifixes are visible to many Christian missionary schools. However, display of crucifixes to non-missionary schools are normally disallowed.

There are no official school subjects for Christian students. However, Christian and other non-Muslim students are allowed to take Bible Knowledge subject, the only Christian-related subject in SPM (Sijil Pelajaran Malaysia or Malaysia Certificate of Education) for secondary school. There are various non-official Christian school subjects, but it mostly caters for Christians and non-Muslims.

== Music ==
There are many Christian songwriters in Malaysia, but the market is still fresh and not widespread. A network called the Malaysian Christian Songwriters Network, has been set up to promote the Malaysian Christian music scene.

== Films ==
Mel Gibson's 2004 film The Passion of The Christ saw a restricted release in Malaysia. Officially, the movie was open only to Christians. Attendance was discouraged as tickets were not carried by the usual box offices. Christian groups such as the National Evangelical Christian Fellowship arranged block bookings of cinemas and distributed tickets to various churches. An initial run of two-months was extended.

The Daughters of St. Paul is a Christian film advertiser that makes investments in Malaysia. Their work in advertising includes The Passion of the Christ and Maria Goretti, both films are only available on DVD in Malaysia, and are most popular in Sabah and Sarawak. The Daughters of St. Paul has locations in Malaysia in Petaling Jaya, Kuala Lumpur, Kota Kinabalu, and Kuching. They are allowed to advertise Christian news, films, and music since they also contribute to the states' economy. However in Peninsular Malaysia they have the limitations to do their work whilst in East Malaysia they have no limitations due to the Keningau Oath Stone and also the Diversity and Harmony that is protected by law in both Sabah and Sarawak.

== Activities ==
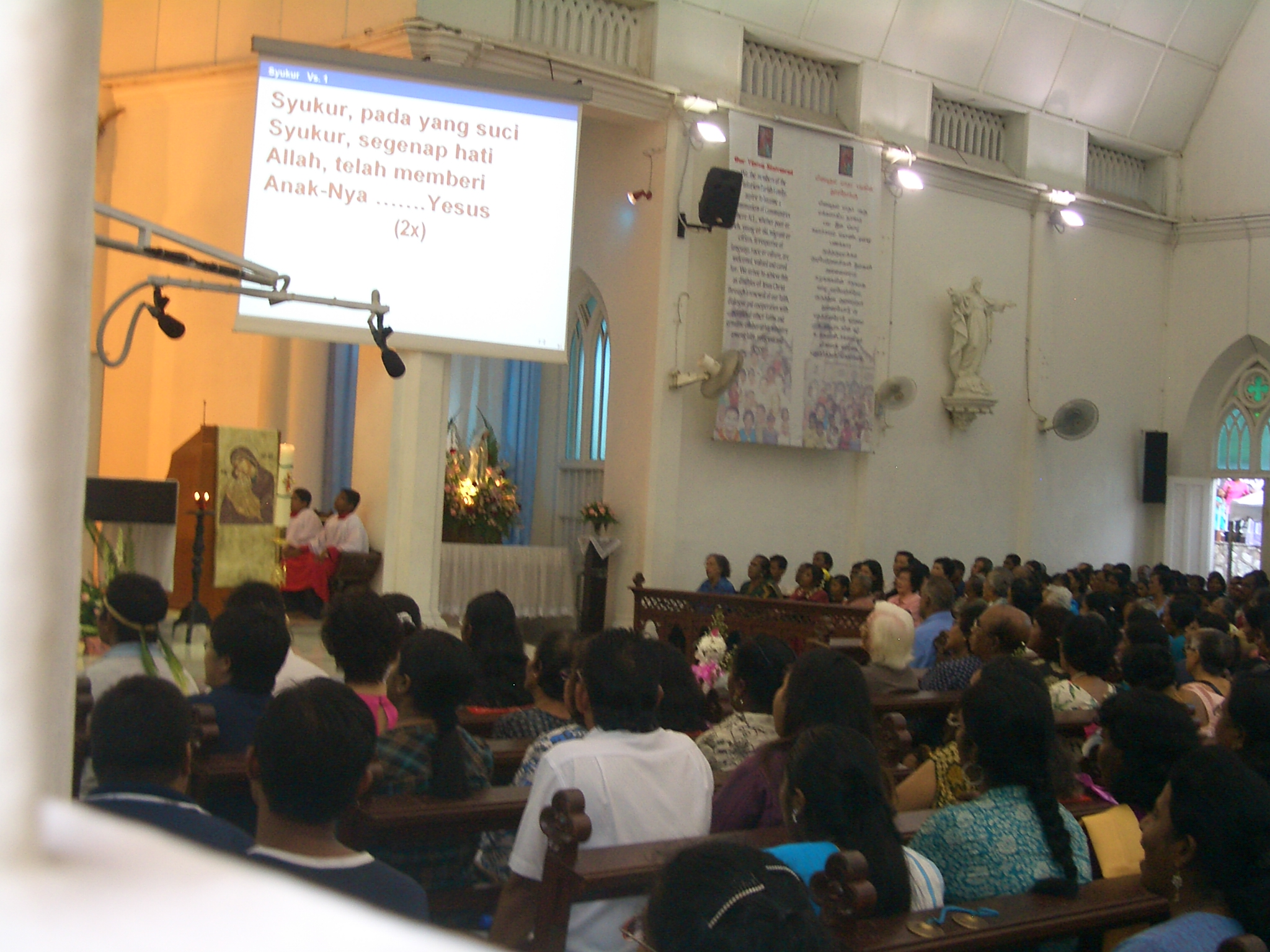
Festive service at the Catholic Church of the Visitation in Seremban.

Actual modes of worship such as the liturgy used and the sermons are not actively censored or controlled by the government. Occasional surveillance of worship by clandestine operatives does occur.

It has been reported that several public secondary schools and universities have unofficially banned on-campus Christian activities, such as Christian Fellowship (CF).

== Holidays ==
=== Christmas ===
Christmas is a public holiday in Malaysia, though much of the public celebration is commercial in nature and has no overt religious overtones. Occasionally, Christians do buy newspaper adverts on Christmas or Easter, but this is largely only allowed in English-language newspapers and permission is not given every year. The adverts themselves are usually indirect statements.

In 2004 the government organised a national-level Christmas celebration but allegedly imposed an unofficial ban on all Christian religious symbols and hymns that specifically mention Jesus Christ. The event was jointly organised by the Arts, Culture and Heritage ministry, the government of the state of Selangor and the Christian Federation of Malaysia (CFM). It was reported in advance that the Prime Minister, the Sultan of Selangor and his consort, as well as assorted cabinet ministers would be in attendance, and that the event would be televised.

O.C. Lim, a former lawyer turned Jesuit priest and director of the Catholic Research Centre (also assistant parish priest of St Francis Xavier's Church) lodged a formal complaint. He also stated that "To exclude (such) carols and to use (Christmas) for political gain is outrageous, scandalous and sacrilegious." He also said "To call it a cultural event (as rationalised by Christian politicians who are more politician than Christian) is to downgrade Jesus to a cultural sage such as Confucius."

CFM general secretary Rev. Dr. Hermen Shastri stated that the government wanted "nothing that insults Islam" during the open house.

Arts, Culture and Heritage Minister Dr Rais Yatim later denied that any such ban had been "issued officially or unofficially". He also added that there is "nothing wrong in singing songs such as 'Silent Night' and 'Merry Christmas'" as they are "joyous songs for the festival."

Lee Min Choon, legal adviser to the CFM and the National Evangelical Christian Fellowship issued a statement which said "It means that churches can celebrate Christmas as they have been doing all along. Otherwise, the very meaning of the occasion will be lost." "Now, everybody should take the government at its word and celebrate Christmas the way they normally celebrate and express their religious faith."

=== Independence Day/Malaysia Day fasting ===
Malaysian Christians sometimes hold fasts ending on Independence Day or Malaysia Day and pray for Muslims. A number of explanations have been given for doing so including a desire to show patriotism, promoting religious harmony, and celebrating freedom of religion. Since 2000 the National Evangelical Christian Fellowship, with 2,800 member churches organizing fasts. Though all previous fasts had ended on Independence Day, the 2010 fast was followed by Malaysia Day and thus for the first time coincided with Ramadan.

== Distribution of Christians ==
Distribution of Christian Malaysians by ethnic group (2010 census)
1. Bumiputera 59.9 (59.0%)
2. Chinese 26.9 (26.5%)
3. Indian 4.3 (4.24%)
4. Other Ethnic Group 1.8 (1.77%)
5. Non - Citizen 8.6 (8.47%)

According to the 2020 census, there were 2,941,049 people self-identifying as Christians (representing 9.1% of total Malaysian population).

=== By gender ===
The 2020 Population and Housing Census Report gives the following statistics:

Male	Female
1,491,696	1,449,353
% of Total Male	% of Total Female
8.8%	9.4%

=== By ethnic group ===
Bumiputra	Chinese	Indian	Other Ethnicities	Non-Malaysian Citizens
1,549,193 (59.2%)	706,479 (26.9%)	114,281 (4.4%)	22,870 (0.8%)	224,336 (8.6%)
% of total Bumiputra	% of total Chinese	% of total Indian	% of total Other Ethnicities	% of total Non-Malaysian Citizens
8.8%	11.0%	6.0%	12.1%	9.7%

=== By state and federal territory ===
Historical growth of the Christian population in Malaysia
Year	Pop.	±%
1970	549,654	—
1980	842,990	+53.4%
1991	1,412,180	+67.5%
2000	2,023,504	+43.3%
2010	2,542,254	+25.6%
2020	2,941,049	+15.7%

Malaysian Population and Housing Census Report from 1970 to the recent 2020 census gives the following statistics, showing the number of Christians in each states and their percentage out of the total population of each states.

State	1970		1980		1991		2000		2010		2020	
State	Number	%	Number	%	Number	%	Number	%	Number	%	Number	%
Johor	25,437	2.0%	22,169	1.4%	34,074	1.7%	51,153	2.0%	107,204	3.3%	121,466	3.0%
Kedah	7,986	0.8%	7,289	0.7%	9,546	0.7%	11,885	0.8%	14,693	0.8%	16,273	0.8%
Kelantan	1,912	0.3%	2,009	0.2%	2,917	0.2%	2,203	0.2%	4,212	0.3%	6,850	0.4%
Malacca	16,093	4.0%	16,376	3.7%	18,391	3.7%	22,268	3.7%	23,878	3.0%	26,282	2.6%
Negeri Sembilan	12,189	2.5%	12,198	2.2%	17,322	2.5%	22,709	2.7%	23,736	2.4%	31,323	2.6%
Pahang	5,094	1.0%	6,127	0.8%	9,289	0.9%	14,147	1.2%	26,938	1.9%	24,164	1.5%
Perak	45,088	2.9%	43,984	2.5%	54,927	2.9%	60,324	3.1%	98,848	4.3%	75,586	3.0%
Perlis	453	0.4%	665	0.5%	1,041	0.6%	1,017	0.5%	1,345	0.6%	1,670	0.6%
Penang	35,146	4.5%	31,645	3.5%	36,279	3.4%	44,584	3.6%	78,089	5.1%	75,345	4.3%
Sabah	157,422	24.2%	258,606	27.2%	470,371	27.6%	690,455	28.0%	831,451	26.7%	843,734	24.7%
Sarawak	171,335	19.3%	351,361	28.5%	598,940	36.6%	853,165	42.4%	1,020,390	42.5%	1,229,653	50.1%
Selangor	70,216	4.3%	47,880	3.4%	90,600	3.9%	166,443	4.2%	206,008	3.9%	344,082	4.9%
Terengganu	1,283	0.3%	1,531	0.3%	4,528	0.6%	2,483	0.3%	2,206	0.2%	2,928	0.3%
FT Kuala Lumpur	–	–	41,150	4.5%	57,360	5.1%	71,757	5.5%	92,242	5.8%	127,695	6.4%
FT Labuan	–	–	–	–	6,595	12.3%	8,911	12.6%	10,426	12.4%	13,118	13.8%
FT Putrajaya	–	–	–	–	–	–	–	–	588	0.9%	880	0.8%
Total Malaysian population	549,654	5.3%	842,990	6.4%	1,412,180	8.1%	2,023,504	9.1%	2,542,254	9.2%	2,941,049	9.1%

=== By urban-rural regions ===
The 2000 Population and Housing Census Report indicates that approximately 11.5% of the rural population and 7.6% of the urban population are adherents to Christianity making Christians the 2nd largest and 4th largest faith community in their respective population strata.

== Freedom of religion ==
In 2023, Malaysia was ranked the 43rd worst country for Christians, though this ranking only included Peninsular Malaysia, excluding East Malaysia being seen as more favourable to Malaysia's Christian population.

Freedom of religion for Christianity and other religions in Malaysia is engraved in the Keningau Oath Stone, though it is only mentioned and confirmed by Sarawak and Sabah.

== See also ==
- Religion in Malaysia
- Catholic Church in Malaysia
- National Evangelical Christian Fellowship
- Status of religious freedom in Malaysia
