= Singapore Baptist Convention =

Baptist Christian denomination in Singapore

- Classification: Evangelical Christianity
- Scripture: Bible
- Theology: Baptist
- Associations: Asia Pacific Baptist Federation, Baptist World Alliance
- Region: Singapore
- Origin: 1971
- Branched from: Malaysia-Singapore Baptist Convention
- Congregations: 37
- Members: 9,200
- Seminaries: Baptist Theological Seminary, Singapore
- Official website: www.baptistconvention.org.sg

The Singapore Baptist Convention is a Baptist Christian denomination in Singapore. It is affiliated to the Asia Pacific Baptist Federation and the Baptist World Alliance.

== History ==
The Convention has its origins in a Chinese mission in 1905. The Swatow Baptist Church in Singapore (Thomson Road Baptist Church) was founded in 1937. In 1965, churches became members of the Malaysia Baptist Convention. In 1971, the Singapore Baptist Churches Fellowship was founded. It was established on 28 December 1974.

It founded the Baptist Theological Seminary, Singapore in 1983.

According to a Convention census released in 2023, it claimed 9,200 members and 37 churches.
