= Borneo Evangelical Church =

Evangelical Christian denomination in Malaysia

- Classification: Protestant
- Orientation: Evangelical, Charismatic
- Polity: Interdependent local, regional and national expressions
- Senior Pastors: Richard Samporoh, Chew Weng Chee, Bina Agong, Lew Lee Choo, Jerry Dusing
- Associations: National Evangelical Christian Fellowship, Christian Federation of Malaysia, Sabah Theological Seminary, Council of Churches of Malaysia and Melbourne School of Theology
- Region: Borneo (Sabah and Sarawak in East Malaysia, Brunei), West Malaysia and Singapore
- Founder: Hudson Southwell (Baptist), Frank Davidson and John Trevor White (Anglican), Carey Tolley (Church of the Brethren)
- Origin: 1928; Sarawak, Malaysia
- Branched from: Borneo Evangelical Mission
- Members: 500,000

The Borneo Evangelical Church or SIB (Malay: Sidang Injil Borneo) is an evangelical Christian denomination in Malaysia. The church was organised in 1959 from the work of the Borneo Evangelical Mission.

== Reach ==
Claiming more than 500,000 members, the SIB church is the largest Protestant denomination in Malaysia having evolved from a small missionary presence among the Lun Bawang and Kelabit people of the Kelabit Highlands of northern Sarawak as well as the Sipitang District of southern Sabah, to the Bisayas and Ibans in Limbang and later the Dusuns of Kota Belud as well as Ranau and the Muruts in Beaufort, Nabawan, Tenom and Keningau all located in Sabah and to a lesser extent other numerous indigenous tribes such as the Kenyahs, Kayans, Punans, Bukitans, Bidayuhs, Penans and Melanaus in Sarawak. It also established large congregations in both East Malaysia and West Malaysia, along with a missionary partner church in Singapore under the Borneo Christian Fellowship umbrella of the SIB Semenanjung Johor district branch congregation.

== See also ==
- Christianity in Malaysia
- Status of religious freedom in Malaysia

== Bibliography ==
- Bray, Jenny, Longhouse of faith, Borneo Evangelical Mission, 1971.
- Bray, Jenny, Longhouse of fear, Borneo Evangelical Mission.
- Cole, R Alan. Emerging pattern. CIM work in the Diocese of Singapore and Malaya, London, China Inland Mission / Overseas Missionary Fellowship, 1961, 48pp.
- Day, Phyllis. Sold twice. the story of a girl in West Malaysia. Original story by Norah Rowe; illustrations by Nancy Harding, OMF, London, 1968, 31pp. Paper. The true story of the conversion of a girl sold as an infant and later bought back by her mother.
- Hunt, Gillian. All the pieces fit, OMF, Singapore, 1987, pp. 28–157.
- Lees, Shirley. Drunk before dawn, OMF, 1979. Story of the Borneo Evangelical Mission now part of the Overseas Missionary Fellowship. ISBN 0-85363-128-X
- Lees, Shirley P. Jungle Fire, Oliphants, 1964, 94pp. Spread of Christianity among Borneo tribal groups in the 1950s.
- Lees, Shirley, and Bill. Is it sacrifice? OMF/IVP/STL, 1987, 192pp. Experiences with the Tagal people in Sabah and other work of the BEM/OMF in East Malaysia. ISBN 9971-972-53-0
- Nightingale, Ken. One way through the jungle, OMF/BEM, 1970.
- Newton, Brian William. A new dawn over Sarawak: the church and its mission in Sarawak, East Malaysia, MA thesis, Fuller Theological Seminary, 1988, 198pp.
- Peterson, Robert. Roaring Lion. Spiritism in Borneo challenged by the power of Christ, Overseas Missionary Fellowship, 1968, 1970.
- Rusha, Gladys. Truth to tell in Borneo, 1969, Oliphants.
- Southwell, C Hudson, Uncharted Waters, 1999, Astana Publishing. ISBN 0-9685440-0-2
