= Malaysia Baptist Convention =

- Logo of the Malaysia Baptist Convention
- Classification: Evangelical Christianity
- Theology: Baptist
- Associations: NECF, APBF, BWA
- Headquarters: Petaling Jaya, Malaysia
- Origin: 1953
- Congregations: 197
- Members: 24,504
- Seminaries: Malaysia Baptist Theological Seminary
- Official website: mbc.org.my

The Malaysia Baptist Convention is a Baptist Christian denomination in Malaysia. It is affiliated with the Baptist World Alliance. The headquarters is in Petaling Jaya.

== History ==
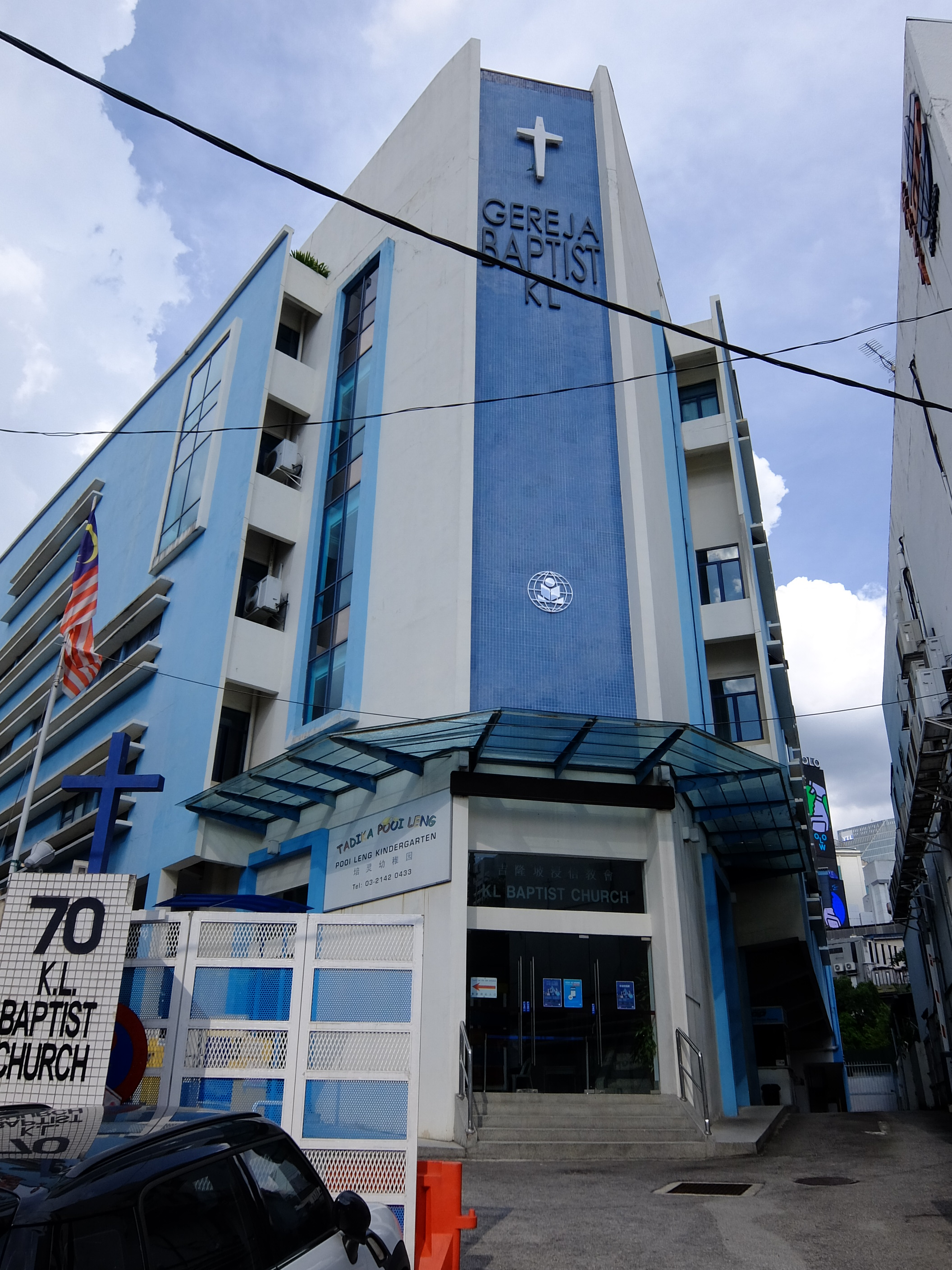
Kuala Lumpur Baptist Church.

The Malaysia Baptist Convention has its origins in a mission of Baptist immigrants from Swatow, China in 1905. The first Baptist church in Alor Setar, Kedah has been established in 1937. Although Baptist work in Malaysia was initiated by Asians, missionaries from the Foreign Mission Board of the Southern Baptist Convention played an important role in helping the new churches establish Baptist distinctives in teaching, polity and ministry.

=== Malaya Baptist Convention ===
In 1953, the Malaya Baptist Convention was organised comprising the following five churches as charter members :

- Oversea Chinese (Swatow) Baptist Church, Alor Setar, Kedah (now Alor Setar Baptist Church)
- Penang Baptist Church, Penang
- Kuala Lumpur Baptist Church, Kuala Lumpur
- Oversea Chinese (Cantonese) Baptist Church, Singapore (now Kay Poh Road Baptist Church)
- Oversea Chinese (Swatow) Baptist Church, Singapore (now Thomson Road Baptist Church)

=== Formation of Malaysia ===
The Malaya Baptist Convention became a member of the Baptist World Alliance in 1957 and continued growing steadily. With the establishment of the larger federation of Malaysia, the convention changed its name to the Malaysia Baptist Convention in 1964. The first edition of the bi-monthly MBC Newsletter was first published in 1966 and that year also saw the convention being formally registered as a society in Malaysia.

In May 1967, a Baptist from Hong Kong, Wong Chung, was appointed the first Secretary General of the MBC and later in the same year, in view of the changing political landscape due to Singapore leaving the Malaysian federation in 1965, the convention changed its name again to the Malaysia-Singapore Baptist Convention.

=== Autonomy of Singapore Baptists ===
On 8 March 1971 the Singapore Baptist Churches Fellowship was set up, becoming on 28 December 1974 the Singapore Baptist Convention. Following a formal separation of the Singapore Baptist Convention in 1975, the Malaysia-Singapore Baptist Convention reverted to its former name, the Malaysia Baptist Convention.

=== A national church established ===
From the time of its formation, membership in the MBC was limited primarily to churches in what was then Malaya (later West Malaysia) and Singapore. In 2005, the Sarawak Baptist Church joined the MBC and this was later followed by the 2006 affiliation of the Sabah Baptist Association making the MBC representative of Baptists throughout Malaysia for the first time.

According to a census published by the association in 2023, it claimed 197 churches and 24,504 members.

== Beliefs and practices ==
The theological positions of the MBC is contained in a Statement of faith adopted in its 1979 Annual Messengers' Conference with articles similar to those adopted by the Southern Baptist Convention in the latter's 1963 revision of the Baptist Faith and Message.

=== Ordinances ===
Similar to most Baptist and Protestant churches, the MBC accepts the Lord's Supper and Baptism as its ordinances. The primary difference is in its understanding of the ordinances where they are viewed not as sacraments with the means of conveying God's saving grace but as symbols acting as outward testimonies to the recipient's faith and commemorations signifying deeper spiritual truths.

=== Gender roles ===
The MBC Statement of Faith does not specify the gender of those called to serve as pastors and deacons in the church. There are women who serve as pastors and associate pastors in churches affiliated with the MBC but to date no women have been officially ordained in the MBC. Whether this is incidental or a matter of policy remain unclear.

=== Languages in use ===
Most MBC affiliated churches have historically conducted services in either English, Mandarin or other varieties of Chinese. Other languages are increasingly being used in recent years including the national language, Malay, as well as non-indigenous languages, like Burmese, Chin, Korean, Nepali, and Tagalog.

=== Vision X208 ===
In 2004, the MBC adopted a 5-year plan dubbed Vision X208 that sought to challenge affiliated churches and Baptist Christians to embark aggressively in church planting and evangelism to double Baptist work in Malaysia. A progress report was published on the MBC website showing significant growth by the year 2007:

	2004	2005	2006	2007
Baptist Churches, Chapels and Outreach points	123	—	162	164
Baptist Believers	13,000	—	16,800	19,143
Baptisms	—	—	—	1,220
MBC Members	45	76	102 *	—
Baptist Seminary Campus	1	2	2	2
Book Store	1	1	1	1
Convention Staff	1	6	3	3
* Both Sarawak Baptist Church and Sabah Baptist Association and their respective members are included

== Schools ==
The Malaysia Baptist Theological Seminary was established in 1954 for the training of national workers. Accredited by the Asia Theological Association, it awards qualifications up to the postgraduate level.

== Institutions ==
The following institutions are affiliated with the MBC:

- Baptist Book Store

The Baptist Book Store is located in Penang and was established by missionaries of Foreign Mission Board of the Southern Baptist Convention (now known as the International Mission Board). Operations of the Baptist Book Store was turned over to the MBC in 1977.

- Golden Sands Baptist Assembly

A retreat centre located in Port Dickson, Negeri Sembilan.

=== Ecumenical and interfaith institutions ===
The MBC participates actively in ecumenical relationships through:

- National Evangelical Christian Fellowship
- Christian Federation of Malaysia
- Evangelical Fellowship of Asia
- World Evangelical Alliance
- Baptist World Alliance
- Asia Pacific Baptist Federation
- Malaysian Consultative Council of Buddhism, Christianity, Hinduism, Sikhism and Taoism

== See also ==
- Bible
- Born again
- Baptist beliefs
- Jesus Christ
- Believers' Church
