= Christian Federation of Malaysia =

- Persekutuan Kristian Malaysia
- Abbreviation: CFM
- Formation: 1985
- Legal status: Federation
- Purpose: To represent the Christian community in Malaysia
- Headquarters: Kuala Lumpur
- President: Most Rev. Julian Leow Beng Kim
- Website: Official website
- Remarks: Christian Federation of Malaysia on Facebook

The Christian Federation of Malaysia (Malay: Persekutuan Kristian Malaysia, abbreviated CFM) is an ecumenical umbrella body in Malaysia that comprises the Council of Churches of Malaysia (mainline Protestants and Oriental Orthodox), National Evangelical Christian Fellowship (Evangelicals) and the Catholic Bishops' Conference of Malaysia (Roman Catholic). Formed in 1985, the CFM brought together the major expressions of Christianity in Malaysia in a broad-based ecumenical body and a unified voice in dealing with the government as well as other religious and secular bodies in the country.

== Background ==
Ecumenical movements developed separately among the various expressions of Christianity in Malaysia with the Council of Churches of Malaysia being first established in 1947 amongst the mainline Protestant churches, followed by the organisation of the Catholic Bishops' Conference of Malaysia, Singapore and Brunei for the Roman Catholic Church in 1964 and finally the National Evangelical Christian Fellowship in 1983 amongst the Evangelical Protestant churches. Prior to the organisation of the CFM, there was no single organisation that could claim to represent the Christian community as a whole in Malaysia when dealing with public matters that affected the community in the country.

On 6 February 1985, representatives from the three main ecumenical Christian organisations in the country formed the Christian Federation of Malaysia and the CFM was duly registered with the Malaysian government on 14 January 1986. To date, the CFM represents more than 90% of the churches in Malaysia.

== Objectives ==
According to its constitution, the stated objectives of CFM are as follows :

- To bring together all Christians who accept the authority of the Holy Bible and who subscribe to the cardinal doctrines of Christianity as set forth in the Apostles’ Creed;
- To reinforce and extend, wherever possible, through dialogue and consultation, the areas of common agreement among the various Christian groups in Malaysia;
- To look after the interests of the Christian community as a whole with particular reference to religious freedom and rights as enshrined in the Federal Constitution;
- To represent the Christian community in Malaysia on all matters that affect or are of interest to it;
- To consult and work with the Government and non-governmental (religious and secular) bodies at all administrative levels, on all matters of common interest and concern.

== Component members ==
The component members of the CFM are:

- The Catholic Bishops Conference of Malaysia
- Council of Churches of Malaysia
- National Evangelical Christian Fellowship

=== Leadership ===
==== Chairpersons ====
The CFM has been led by representatives of various Christian denominations since its formation in 1985:

Year	Name	Denomination
2017–	Most Rev. Julian Leow Beng Kim	Roman Catholic Church
2011–2017	Rev. Dr. Eu Hong Seng	Full Gospel Tabernacle (Charismatic)
2009–2011	Bishop Datuk Ng Moon Hing	Anglican Church
2005–2009	Bishop Dr. Paul Tan Chee Ing	Roman Catholic Church
2001–2005	Rev. Datuk Dr. Prince Guneratnam	Assemblies of God
1997–2001	Bishop Datuk Yong Ping Chung	Anglican Church
1995–1997	Bishop James Chan	Roman Catholic Church
1993–1995	Elder David Boler	Christian Brethren
1989–1993	Bishop Dr. Denis Dutton	Methodist Church
1985–1989	Bishop Antony Selvanayagam	Roman Catholic

== Organisation and work ==
The CFM has liaison committees established in each of Malaysia's states and Federal territories which liaises with the state authorities on issues affecting the Christian community in the respective states. These state committees also act as the Christian component of the states branches of the Malaysian Consultative Council of Buddhism, Christianity, Hinduism, Sikhism and Taoism (MCCBCHST).

=== Representation in the federal government ===
CFM through the MCCBCHST sits in the Committee for the Promotion of Understanding and Harmony among Religious Adherents under the aegis of the National Unity and Integration Department.

=== Representation in the state governments ===
CFM is also represented in the Committee for Affairs Other than Islam of the state of Selangor as well as the Advisory Committee for Non-Islamic Places of Worship of the Federal Territory of Kuala Lumpur

=== National Christian Conferences ===
The CFM organises periodic national conferences for the Christian community in Malaysia covering various contemporary issues facing the national Church. Nine such conferences were held from 1979 to 2014.

=== Advocacy ===
The CFM has also been very vocal in the advocacy of civil and religious rights, particularly those affecting the Christian community in Malaysia.

Recent cases include the advocacy of the right for Malaysian Christians to use the word "Allah" as part of their Malay liturgical language (the Allah Controversy), responding to the threat of violence against Christians and the Bible, engaging religious intolerance and the confiscation of the Malay translation of the Bible by state authorities.

== See also ==
- Christianity in Malaysia
- The Catholic Bishops Conference of Malaysia
- Council of Churches of Malaysia
- National Evangelical Christian Fellowship
- Malaysian Consultative Council of Buddhism, Christianity, Hinduism, Sikhism and Taoism
