= Borneo Evangelical Mission =

Malaysian Protestant Evangelical Christian missionary society

- Classification: Protestant
- Orientation: Evangelical, Charismatic
- Polity: Interdependent local, regional, and national expressions
- Associations: Melbourne School of Theology China Inland Mission Overseas Missionary Fellowship
- Founder: Hudson Southwell, Frank Davidson and Carey Tolley
- Origin: 1928; Melbourne, Australia
- Members: 500,000

The Borneo Evangelical Mission is a Protestant Evangelical Christian missionary society that worked among the people of Borneo, Malaysia. It was founded in October 1928 by three Australian missionaries, Hudson Southwell (Baptist), Frank Davidson (Anglican) and Carey Tolley (Church of the Brethren). In 1975 the BEM merged with Overseas Missionary Fellowship (formerly the China Inland Mission).

== History ==
The Borneo Evangelical Mission (BEM) was pioneered by Hudson Southwell together with two fellow missionaries Frank Davidson and Carey Tolley of Australia. They boarded an old cargo steamer from Melbourne in early October 1928 bound for Singapore. Travelling with them was Alexander Henderson, a pioneer of the Southeast Asian timber trade who had offered to help establish a base on the island of Borneo. Henderson left the team the following year.

On 12 November 1928, Southwell and Henderson landed in Kuching, Borneo. The Rajah, Charles Vyner Brooke, gave permission to establish a mission in Sarawak and recommended starting in the Limbang area to the north-east. Davidson and Tolley were to join them later.

Sarawak, together with Sabah and the Federation of Malayan States came together and formed Malaysia in 1963. With the increasing use of the Malaysian national language, Borneo Evangelical Mission (BEM) soon became Sidang Injil Borneo (SIB). Today, SIB churches may be found in Sarawak, Sabah and Peninsular Malaysia.

== Bibliography ==
- Bray, Jenny, Longhouse of faith, Borneo Evangelical Mission, 1971.
- Bray, Jenny, Longhouse of fear, Borneo Evangelical Mission.
- Cole, R Alan. Emerging pattern. CIM work in the Diocese of Singapore and Malaya, London, China Inland Mission / Overseas Missionary Fellowship, 1961, 48pp.
- Day, Phyllis. Sold twice. the story of a girl in West Malaysia. Original story by Norah Rowe; illustrations by Nancy Harding, OMF, London, 1968, 31pp. Paper. True story of the conversion of a girl sold as an infant and later bought back by her mother.
- Hunt, Gillian. All the pieces fit, OMF, Singapore, 1987, pp. 28–157.
- Lees, Shirley. Drunk before dawn, OMF, 1979. Story of the Borneo Evangelical Mission now part of the Overseas Missionary Fellowship. ISBN 0-85363-128-X
- Lees, Shirley P. Jungle Fire, Oliphants, 1964, 94pp. Spread of Christianity among Borneo tribal groups in the 1950s.
- Lees, Shirley and Bill. Is it sacrifice? OMF/IVP/STL, 1987, 192pp. Experiences with the Tagal people in Sabah and other work of the BEM/OMF in East Malaysia. ISBN 9971-972-53-0
- Nightingale, Ken. One way through the jungle, OMF/BEM, 1970.
- Newton, Brian William. A new dawn over Sarawak: the church and its mission in Sarawak, East Malaysia, MA thesis, Fuller Theological Seminary, 1988, 198pp.
- Peterson, Robert. Roaring Lion. Spiritism in Borneo challenged by the power of Christ, Overseas Missionary Fellowship, 1968, 1970.
- Rusha, Gladys. Truth to tell in Borneo, 1969, Oliphants.
- Southwell, C Hudson, Uncharted Waters, 1999, Astana Publishing. ISBN 0-9685440-0-2
