= Malaysia Baptist Theological Seminary =

Coordinates: 5.48°N 100.26°E

- Motto: Head, Heart, and Hands
- Established: 1954
- Affiliation: Malaysian Association of Theological Schools
- President: Rev. Dr. John Ong
- Location: Batu Ferringhi, Penang, Malaysia
- Website: mbts.org.my

Malaysia Baptist Theological Seminary (MBTS) is a denominational seminary affiliated with the Malaysia Baptist Convention. It is located in Batu Ferringhi, Penang, Malaysia. Established in 1954, MBTS is accredited by the Asia Theological Association (ATA).

== Brief history ==
MBTS was established in 1954 by missionaries from the Southern Baptist Convention to train those who can testify to a call to full-time work in a local church.

== Organization ==
MBTS is governed by the Seminary Board of the Malaysia Baptist Convention.

== Programs ==
MBTS offers academic programs leading to the awarding of the following qualifications:

=== Certificates and diplomas ===
- Certificate in Christian Counseling

This certificate program requires the completion of 10 credits and is offered on a part time basis.

- Certificate of Marriage and Family Studies

This certificate program requires the completion of 10 credits and is offered on a part time basis.

- Diploma in Christian Counseling

This diploma program requires the completion of 24 credits and is offered on a part time basis.

- Diploma in Early Childhood Christian Education

This diploma program requires the completion of 20 credits and is offered on a part time basis.

- Diploma in Christian Studies

This diploma program requires the completion of 72 credits.

- Diploma in Theology

This diploma program requires the completion of 141 credits and is offered in Malay, English, and Chinese.

=== Undergraduate ===
- Bachelor of Theology

This degree program requires the completion of 154 credits and is offered in Malay, and English.

=== Postgraduate ===
- Graduate Diploma in Christian Counseling

This graduate diploma program requires the completion of 24 credits.

- Graduate Diploma of Christian Studies

This graduate diploma program requires the completion of 38 credits.

- Master in Christian Studies

This degree program requires the completion of 72 credits.

- Master of Ministry
- Master of Divinity

This degree program requires the completion of 119 credits.

- Master of Arts in Mission

This degree program requires the completion of 40 credits and is conducted in partnership with the US Center for World Mission using the latter's World Christian Foundations study program.

- Master of Arts

This degree program is offered with the following majors:
- Pastoral Ministry
- Biblical Studies
- Holistic Child Development
- Christian Education
- Evangelism and Church Planting
- Missiology

- Master of Theology

This degree program requires the completion of 36 credits and is offered with the following majors:
- Biblical Studies
- Missions

- Doctor of Ministry (Pastoral Leadership)

This degree program requires the completion of 45 credits.

- Doctor of Missiology

This degree program requires the completion of 45 credits.

== Accreditation and affiliation ==
The following programs offered by MBTS are accredited by the ATA:

- Diploma in Theology
- Bachelor of Theology
- Master in Christian Studies
- Master of Divinity
- Master of Art in Pastoral Studies
- Master of Art in Holistic Child Development
- Doctor of Ministry

MBTS is also a founder member of the Malaysian Association of Theological Schools which allows a certain number of credits in the undergraduate programs to be transferable among member schools.
