= Evangelical Lutheran Zion Church, Kuala Lumpur =

Church in Kuala Lumpur, Malaysia

Coordinates: 3°07′44″N 101°41′11″E

Evangelical Lutheran Zion Church
- Zion Lutheran Cathedral
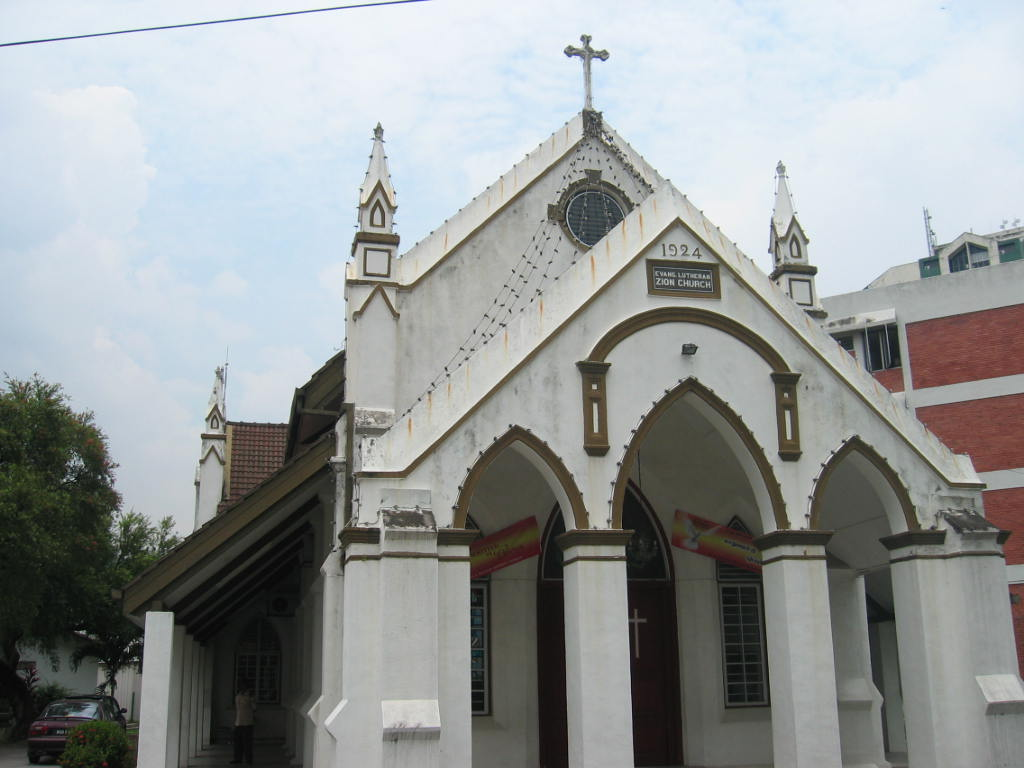
- Evangelical Lutheran Zion Church, Kuala Lumpur
- Evangelical Lutheran Zion Church
- Address: 21 Jln. Sultan Abdul Samad, Brickfields, 50470 Kuala Lumpur
- Denomination: Protestant-Lutheran
- Website: https://www.elcm.org.my/

History
- Founder(s): Rev. T. Joseph and Rev. S. Muthuswamy

Architecture
- Completed: 1924

Administration
- District: Central District
- Diocese: National ELCM

Clergy
- Bishop: Rt. Rev. Steven Lawrence 2020 - present
- Pastor(s): Rev. David Devapirian, Rev. Balan Moses, Rev. Caleb Santhosam

The Evangelical Lutheran Zion Church is a Protestant Lutheran church situated at Jalan Sultan Abdul Samad, Brickfields, Kuala Lumpur, Malaysia. It was built to serve mainly Tamil labourers from South India many of whom were Lutherans.

== Background ==
The Lutheran mission can trace its origins back to a meeting held in 1906 at the Anglo-Tamil School, Kuala Lumpur, attended by Rev. K. Pamperrien, President of the Leipzig Evangelical Lutheran Mission in India, and his colleague, Rev. T. Joseph, who were on a visit to enquire into the condition of the Lutheran followers in the Malay Peninsula. They found that the Lutherans, who were mostly Indian Tamils who had come to work on the plantations, had no proper place to worship or pastor to administer to them, and so to remedy the situation it was decided to establish a Lutheran evangelical mission to serve the community and to appoint Rev. T. Joseph as the first resident pastor.

Rev. T. Joseph was installed in Kuala Lumpur as head of the mission on 11 November 1906 and set about establishing a congregation and raising funds to supplement the financial support provided by the Tamil Evangelical Lutheran Church in India. In the absence of a church for worship, a shop-house in Scott Road was used to conduct services.

From its establishment, the mission had expressed the desire to build a church for Lutherans but it was not until 16 years later that their wish was fulfilled. Completed in 1924 under the supervision of Rev. S. Muthuswamy, who succeeded Rev. T. Joseph in 1921, it was formerly opened at a ceremony on 30 November 1924 when the church was blessed by Rev. J. Sandegren, Bishop of Trarquebar, India, and named the "Evangelical Lutheran Zion Church".

At the church's silver jubilee celebrations in 1950 plaques were unveiled in memory of Rev. T. Joseph and Rev. S. Muthuswamy in recognition of their contributions to the founding of the Lutheran mission and the establishment of the church.

== Description ==
The rectangular shaped church, made of brick, stands nine metres high but is without a tower so a belfry was erected on the ground next to the church to house the bell which has on it words inscribed in Tamil. The sloped roof is covered with clay tiles and supported by columns and struts of hardwood. Stained glass windows are in evidence above the main door and behind the altar. On the facade is inscribed the date '1924' and its name.
