= BBM (software) =

Instant messaging software

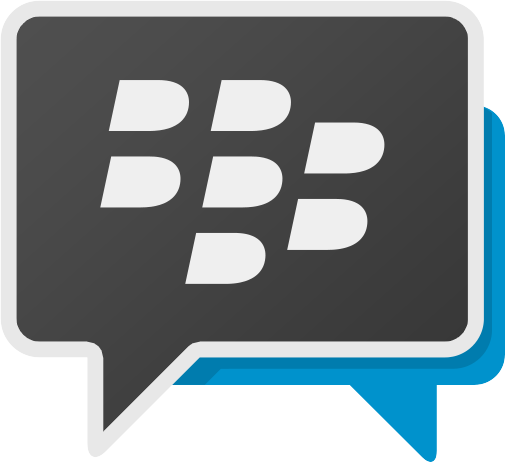
- Developers: BlackBerry (2005–present); Emtek (2017–2019)
- Release: August 1, 2005; 21 years ago
- Final release: 10.15.7.5 / May 2017; 9 years ago
- Operating system: BlackBerry OS; BlackBerry 10; iOS; Android; Windows Phone 8; Windows 10 Mobile; Nokia X
- Successor: BBM Enterprise
- Type: Instant messaging client
- License: Freemium
- Website: bbm.com

BBM, formally known by its full name BlackBerry Messenger, was a consumer-oriented proprietary mobile instant messenger and videotelephony application service originally developed by BlackBerry Limited and later briefly by Indonesian company Emtek under license. Initially it was included and offered on BlackBerry devices before it was expanded to cross-platform in 2013. BBM was shut down on May 31, 2019; the company since continues to offer the paid enterprise edition, BBM Enterprise, which forms a part of BlackBerry Unified Endpoint Manager (UEM) service.

Messages sent via BBM were sent over the Internet and sent using the BlackBerry PIN system. In the past, many service providers allowed sign-in to BBM using a dedicated BlackBerry data plan. Exchanging messages was possible to a single person or via dedicated discussion or chat groups, which allowed multiple BlackBerry devices to communicate in a single session. In addition to offering text-based instant messages, BBM also allowed users to send pictures, voicenotes (audio recordings), files (up to 16 MB), share real time location on a map, stickers and a wide selection of emojis.

Communication was possible only among BlackBerry devices, until late 2013 when BBM was released on iOS and Android systems followed by Windows Phone. Over 300 million Stickers were shared. Daily, approximately 150,000 BBM Voice Calls were placed. There were more than 190 million BBM users worldwide as of 2015, and BlackBerry infrastructure handled 30 petabytes of data traffic each month by early 2013. BBM was the original "mobile-first" messaging service, and was popular for a while before it started to lose out to rivals such as WhatsApp and Telegram. It remained particularly popular in Indonesia, the only country where BBM was the most popular instant messenger in 2016 – installed on 87.5% of Android devices.

== History ==
BlackBerry Messenger was launched on August 1, 2005.

With the release of BlackBerry Messenger 5.0, BlackBerry allows users to use a QR Code to add each other to their respective friends lists rather than using only numeric PIN identification or an email address associated with the user's BlackBerry. Recent BlackBerry devices can also exchange BBM contacts using Near Field Communication technology. Users can also set animated gif pictures as their display pictures, although animated pictures have a 32KB size limit.

The release of BlackBerry Messenger 6.0 introduced additional traits. This update is focused on social communication mediums, including 'BBM Connected Apps', which allow the user to invite friends to share their favourite BlackBerry Applications.

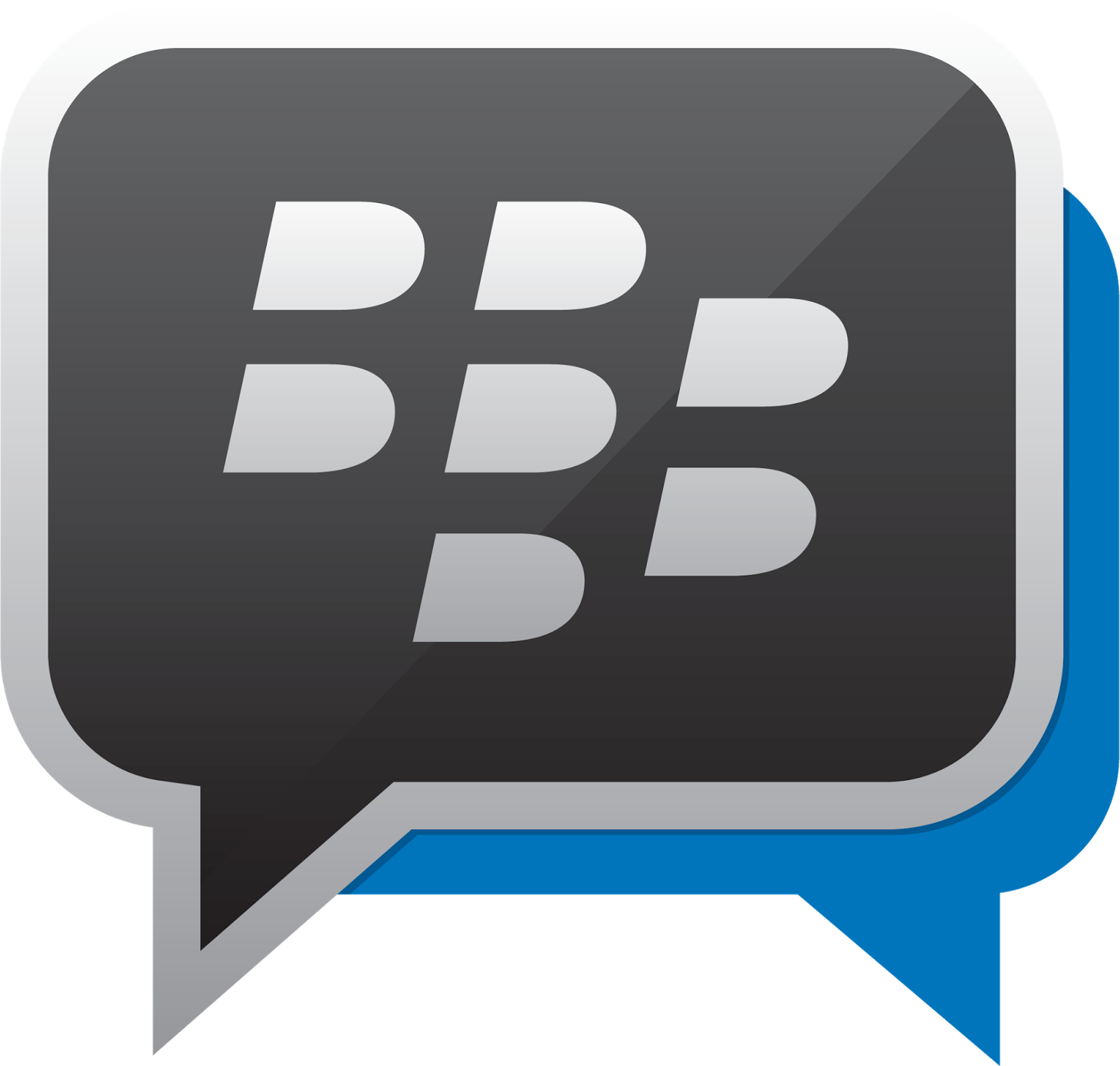
Older logo

In late-December 2011, the audience measurement company BBM Canada sued RIM for infringing its trademark of "BBM" by using it as an initialism for BlackBerry Messenger; BBM Canada used it as an initialism for its former name, the Bureau of Broadcast Measurement. The company cited that it had received phone calls from users who believed that they were connected to RIM. However, RIM asked for the case to be dropped, as the two organizations were in different industries. The suit was dismissed, and BBM Canada ultimately re-branded as Numeris.

With the release of BlackBerry Messenger 7.0 in December 2012, voice chat (BBM Voice Call) was introduced.

BBM Protected, a "secure" encrypted enterprise-level messenger, was launched in June 2014.

On June 27, 2016, it was announced that Indonesia-based Emtek Group had acquired the licensing rights for BBM. BlackBerry Limited would provide the BBM API to Emtek as part of the six-year, $207 million deal. In 2017, the BBM servers moved from a data center in Canada to a Google Cloud Platform-based data center in Asia.

On April 18, 2019 BBM announced that they would discontinue the BBM for consumer service globally as of May 31 that year and that users would be able to switch to BBMe, the paid, enterprise version of the messenger.

== Reliability ==
BBM has been widely reputed for its uptime and reliability. However, on October 10, 2011, users of the service in North America, Europe, the Middle East and Africa were widely affected by an outage at provider RIM's UK headquarters in Slough, England. The outage lasted for two days, during which BlackBerry Messenger was reported to be unavailable, thus seriously affecting the company's reputation.

== Cross-platform ==
BlackBerry CEO Thorsten Heins announced on May 14, 2013, that BlackBerry Messenger will be available on iOS and Android in the summer of 2013. This would mark the first steps of BlackBerry Messenger reaching beyond its own platform, as it had never been available on competing hardware before.

It was rumoured that BlackBerry Messenger would launch on June 27, 2013, for Android and iOS. This was later denied by BlackBerry and an actual release date was yet to be announced.

On June 21, 2013, a BlackBerry Messenger application was spotted on the Play Store. However, it turned out to be a fake.

A worldwide release for BBM on Android was slated for September 21, 2013, which was officially announced by BlackBerry. It was also announced that the app would require Android versions not older than 4.x.x (Ice Cream Sandwich & above).

BlackBerry confirmed that BBM for iPhone would release on September 22, a day later after the official Android release and would work on iPhones running iOS 6 & later. However, during the worldwide rollout of BBM for Android and iPhone on September 21, 2013, 1.1 million Android users downloaded a leaked BlackBerry Messenger APK which caused BlackBerry to cease the launching of BlackBerry Messenger on both Android and iOS platforms.

BBM was officially released on iOS and Android on October 21, 2013. 5 million downloads were recorded in the first 8 hours of its release. BBM, in late 2013, was the No.1 free app on both the App Store and Google Play Store. In total, the app had over 10 million downloads on the first day.

On 24 February 2014, BlackBerry officially confirmed BBM for Windows Phone and Nokia X would be released by Q2 2014. Nokia confirmed BBM would be preinstalled on Nokia X devices. As of June 2016, BBM was no longer offered on the Windows Store.

On 27 June 2018, consumer features such as BBM Channels and paid content in the BBM Shop were discontinued on BB10 and BBOS devices.

On April 18, 2019, it was announced that the BBM consumer service for Android and iOS will be shutting down on May 31, 2019.

=== Non-BlackBerry features ===
For now BBM for Multi-Platform will offer Personal Chats, Group Chat up to 250 people, Status Updates and can send or receive messages up to 2000 Characters. BBM Channels, BBM Voice and BBM Shop is available on Android and iOS.

In early January 2014, a beta update for BBM on Android was released to testers. The update included BBM Voice & BBM Channels. In February 2014, an update (2.0.0.13) was officially released to Android and iOS users containing the awaited features along with some other features including new emoticons and changes including a new look for Updates featuring choices to show All, Contacts or Channels filters.

== Security ==
On November 4, 2014, BBM scored 1 out of 7 points on the Electronic Frontier Foundation's "Secure Messaging Scorecard". It lost points because communications are not encrypted with a key the provider doesn't have access to (i.e. communications are not end-to-end encrypted), users can't verify contacts' identities, past messages are not secure if the encryption keys are stolen (i.e. the app does not provide forward secrecy), the code is not open to independent review (i.e. the code is not open-source), the security design is not properly documented, and there has not been a recent independent code audit.

The enterprise version, BBM Protected, initially scored 3 out of 7 points. It later scored 5 out of 7 points after additional information was provided by BlackBerry and reflected in the EFF changelog dated November 14, 2014. It lost points because past messages are not secure if the encryption keys are stolen and the code is not open to independent review.

== Userbase ==
In May 2011, RIM claimed there were 43 million active BlackBerry Messenger users worldwide.

In 2016, BBM reached over 889 million users from all over the world and ranked second in the top messaging apps after Telegram

As of January 2018, there were at least 63 million monthly users in Indonesia.
