= Google Founders' Award =

Award for entrepreneurial achievement

The Google Founders' Award was a special award for entrepreneurial achievement awarded to groups at Google Inc.

The awards are given in the form of stock grants, and the program was initiated in 2004 by Google founders Sergey Brin and Lawrence E. Page to reward groups.

Winners of this award have primarily been the internal teams behind applications developed by Google, such as teams behind Google Chrome, Gmail, and Google Maps.
