= BBM Enterprise =

BlackBerry instant messaging client

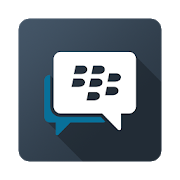
- Developer: BlackBerry
- Initial release: June 2014; 12 years ago
- Stable release: 1.16.0.12 / April 12, 2023; 3 years ago
- Operating system: Windows, macOS, iOS, Android, BlackBerry 10
- Predecessor: BlackBerry Messenger
- Type: Instant messaging client
- License: Proprietary trialware
- Website: bbm.com

BBM Enterprise (abbreviated as BBMe) is a centralized instant messaging client provided by Canadian company BlackBerry. BBMe is marketed as a secure messenger with end-to-end encryption.

BBMe was launched in 2014 as BBM Protected based on a revamped version of BBM (BlackBerry Messenger), the company's consumer-oriented instant messenger.

The service consists of group chats, voice and video calls. Unlike its predecessor, BBMe is not entirely free, lasting for a year before costing $2.49 for six months and requires a BlackBerry Unified Endpoint Manager (UEM) client.

== BBMe for Personal Use ==
Initially offered only for enterprise customers, BBMe was opened up to all customers as BBMe for Personal Use in 2019 after the shutting down of the older consumer BlackBerry Messenger service.

On 1 May 2024, BBMe for Personal Use users were notified of their service's discontinuation effective 1 Nov 2024. The service was shut down in November 2024.

== System and software ==
From the client to server, messages in BBMe are encrypted using TLS. Each message has its own random encryption public and private key. It uses a FIPS 140-2 certified cryptographic library for generating the keys. According to BlackBerry Ltd., BBMe complies with the following standards:

- Digital signature FIPS 186-4
- AES symmetric encryption standard FIPS 197
- HMAC standard FIPS 198-1 based on based on SHA2-256
- Cryptographic key generation standard NIST SP 800-133
- Secure Hash standard FIPS 180-4

In addition, it makes use of EC-SPEKE, KDF and One-Pass DH (all National Institute of Standards and Technology algorithm standards) with "256-bit equivalent security".
