= National Evangelical Christian Fellowship =

- Founded: 1983
- Type: Evangelical organization
- Purpose: Evangelical Christianity
- Location: Malaysia
- Affiliations: World Evangelical Alliance
- Website: www.necf.org.my

The National Evangelical Christian Fellowship (NECF) is a national evangelical alliance in Malaysia, member of the World Evangelical Alliance.

== History ==
The organization was formed in 1983. It was formed to provide a network of support for churches and individuals living with the challenges of religious laws, particularly the limiting of the number of sites for worship and the outlawing of public gatherings of five or more people. In 2023, almost 60% of churches in Malaysia are members of NECF.

== Current status ==
It is part of the World Evangelical Alliance, the Christian Federation of Malaysia and the Evangelical Fellowship of Asia.

In 2023, the organization is led by Rev Dr Eu Hong Seng. Its current work includes working with churches in the area of Bible teaching, missions and social action.

== Member churches ==
- Assembly of God
- Malaysia Baptist Convention
- Christian Brethren of Malaysia
- Evangelical Free Church
- Full Gospel Assembly
- Full Gospel Tabernacle
- Hope of God Church
- Independent Churches
- Latter Rain Church
- The Salvation Army
- Sidang Injil Borneo Sabah
- Sidang Injil Borneo Sarawak
- Sidang Injil Borneo Semenanjung
- Bible Seminaries
- Parachurches
- Others – Individual Churches from mainstream denominations: Methodist, Presbyterian, etc.

== See also ==
- Christianity in Malaysia
- Status of religious freedom in Malaysia
- Methodist Church in Malaysia
- Borneo Evangelical Church
- Roman Catholicism in Malaysia
