= Evangelical Free Church of Canada =

- Classification: Evangelical
- Polity: Free Church and Congregationalist
- Associations: Evangelical Fellowship of Canada and the International Federation of Free Evangelical Churches
- Region: Canada
- Origin: 1917; Enchant, Alberta
- Separated from: Evangelical Free Church of America
- Branched from: Mission Friends
- Congregations: 145
- Official website: www.efcc.ca

The Evangelical Free Church of Canada (EFCC) is an evangelical Christian denomination in Canada. Its home office is located in Langley, British Columbia, on the campus of Trinity Western University. EFCC is an affiliate of the Evangelical Fellowship of Canada and the International Federation of Free Evangelical Churches.

== History ==
The EFCC was founded in 1917 at Enchant, Alberta. It merged with the Fellowship of Gospel Churches in 1957 and was incorporated under federal charter in 1967. It became autonomous from the Evangelical Free Church of America in 1984.

In 1962, the Evangelical Free Church of Canada and the Evangelical Free Church of America founded Trinity Western University as a college.

Trinity Western Seminary became a graduate division of the University, and the EFCC is uniquely partnered with several other denominational seminaries under the name Associated Canadian Theological Schools (ACTS). The Fosmark family, particularly brothers Carl and Lee, gave noteworthy leadership to the development of the EFCC. In 1993, in recognition of their vision and contribution, the building that now houses the Free Church seminary, Trinity Western Seminary, as well as the Home Office for National and International Ministries of the EFCC, was named the Fosmark Centre.

The EFCC operates national and international mission arms known as ServeCanada and ServeBeyond. The international mission was previously known as Evangelical Free Church of Canada Mission (EFCCM).

In 1990, there were 10,000 members in Canada.

Shaun Wick was elected President of the EFCC in September 2025, succeeding Bill Taylor who retired after 18 years of service.

According to a denomination census released in 2023, it claimed 145 churches.

== Doctrine ==
To update archaic language, to clarify theological ambiguity and to address new issues, the EFCC passed a substantial revision to its Statement of Faith on July 26, 2008, the first revision since the Statement was first adopted in 1950.

== Distinctives ==
In May 2008 The Board of Directors of the EFCC approved a document that reflects that which characterizes the Evangelical Free Church of Canada community of churches and chose to move from "Distinctives" to "Our Character and Calling".
