= Christian Brethren of Malaysia =

- Classification: Protestant
- Orientation: Plymouth Brethren
- Polity: Congregationalist
- Associations: NECF
- Region: Malaysia
- Origin: 1859
- Congregations: 150
- Members: 13,500 (including children)
- Primary schools: 3
- Secondary schools: 3

The Christian Brethren of Malaysia, sometimes simply called the Brethren, are an aggregate of independent and autonomous Protestant Evangelical Christian churches in Malaysia, which are networked together through a set of shared Biblical doctrines and practices. Most of these churches are associated with the faith and practices of the Plymouth Brethren movement that arose in the late 1820s.

Each Brethren assembly is independent in its administration, and there is no larger policy making body or federation. The primary organised links between the Brethren assemblies are the Christian Brethren of Malaysia Property Trust Berhad which holds the properties of the local Brethren assemblies in trust and the Christian Brethren Secretariat Malaysia which coordinates joint activities between the local Brethren assemblies.

== History ==
=== Early nonconformist missionary work ===
Etching of the Penang Mission Chapel, circa 1824

Early Brethren missionary work in Malaysia is not well recorded but can be traced to the early work of nonconformist Christian missionaries.

In 1821, a mission house was purchased in Penang by the London Missionary Society (LMS) and used as a Chinese girls' school. A chapel was opened in the same premise in 1824. In 1826, the Independent Church, Mission Chapel Prince of Wales Island was officially founded as an independent, non-denominational church modelled on the primitive New Testament Church. Based on their own description, their practices resembled those of the early Brethren, which emerged at precisely the same time in Britain.

The conclusion of the First Opium War and the signing of the Treaty of Nanking in 1842 opened the possibility of new missionary work and the LMS started to wind down their mission stations in the Straits Settlements to focus on the newly opened treaty ports in China.

In 1843, the LMS school and chapel was administered by Maria Dyer, the widow of Samuel Dyer, an LMS missionary known as a typographer for creating a steel typeface of Chinese characters for printing to replace traditional wood blocks. Maria Dyer remarried fellow nonconformist missionary, Johann Georg Bausum, in 1845. The administration of the LMS school was entrusted to the Bausams in 1846 in recognition of Maria Dyer's contribution as a missionary wife in exchange for its upkeep.

Maria Dyer's death in 1846 left the school in the care of Bausum. In 1847, Bausum informed the LMS that he had purchased an adjacent property to expand the school but the newly purchased property was not transferred to the LMS. On Bausum's death in 1855, both the properties came under the temporary charge of the harbourmaster of Penang, George Felix Gottlieb, and the school remained under the administration of independent nonconformist missionaries who were supported by diverse various missionary societies including the Chinese Evangelisation Society, George Müller’s Scriptural Knowledge Institution for Home and Abroad, the Society for Promotion of Female Education in the East.

In January 1860, Gottlieb wrote to the LMS reporting the arrival of John Chapman and his wife:

With respect to the Chapel I have not the time to draw up an estimate of the probable expense of putting in order but as the missionaries for this place Mr. and Mrs. Chapman, and Miss O Callaghan (of the Chinese Evangelisation Society) have arrived at Singapore, and are expected here in a few days; I had better, I think, leave it with Mr. Chapman to make his report to you on the condition of the Chapel.

The arrival in Penang of the Chapmans, who were encouraged to leave Bristol and work in the island by George Müller, marked the beginning of formal Brethren missionary work in Malaysia.

=== Early Brethren work ===
The Chapmans were joined later in the year by Alexander Grant, an English Presbyterian missionary who shared the Chapmans' Brethren conviction on adult baptism by immersion. Grant who was staying with the Chapmans to recuperate from an accident and a typhoid infection acted upon his convictions and was re-baptised by the Chapmans, severing his ties with the Presbyterian church.

Typical missionary work conducted by the Chapmans and Grant included frequent itineration to villages both on Penang Island and on the mainland, distributing tracts in Malay, Chinese, Tamil, Hindi, and English. The missionaries also evangelised the captains and crews of the boats in Penang Harbour, offered medicine to opium addicts, and distributed tracts to the inmates in Penang's Debtor's Prison.

In 1866, the Chapmans visited England and returned with three new recruits, Mr. and Mrs. William Macdonald and Miss Lucy A. Judd. The mission work was handed over to the Macdonalds in 1868 who remained in Penang until 1911.

=== Inter Brethren agencies ===
The following agencies organise and co-ordinate work between the various Brethren assemblies:

- Christian Brethren of Malaysia Property Trust Berhad
- Christian Brethren Secretariat Malaysia
- Emmaus Bible Centre (Kuala Lumpur)
- Family Life Ministry
- GLO Training School
- Inter Brethren Assemblies (IBA) Youth Development / Residential Bible School
- Klang Valley Assembly Elders Council
- Malaysia Myanmar Ministry
- MMS Trust
- Pan Malaysia OA Mission

== See also ==
- Christianity in Malaysia
- Open Brethren
- Plymouth Brethren
