= M. Moorthy =

Malaysian army corporal and mountain climber

- மூர்த்தி மணியம்
- Born: Moorthy Maniam; 1969; Malaysia
- Died: 20 December 2005 (aged 35–36); Kuala Lumpur, Malaysia
- Spouse: Kaliammal Sinnasamy
- Children: Thenesvari (aged 9 in 2006)

Moorthy Maniam (Tamil: மூர்த்தி மணியம்), simply known as M. Moorthy, was a corporal in the Malaysian Army and a member of the first group of Malaysians to successfully climb Mount Everest. He was a Malaysian Indian, born and raised Hindu.

== Army career and Mount Everest ==
Moorthy joined the armed forces in 1988. He was one of ten people in the Malaysia Everest 1997 team among whom two members, M. Magendran and N. Mohanadas, became the first Malaysians who climbed to the summit of Mount Everest, reaching the peak on 23 May 1997. On 14 August of the following year, while at the Sungai Udang army camp in Melaka, he fell during a training exercise and became paralysed from the waist down. According to his wife, his mental faculties also declined in parallel with his physical condition; he suffered emotional disturbances and short-term memory loss, and once forgot the way back to his house and had to telephone for help. Records of the Malaysian Armed Forces state that he embraced Islam on 11 October 2004 and filed an application with his superiors to be registered as such on 8 March 2005; however, his military identity card was never modified to reflect this change of religion or his reported new Muslim name of Mohammad Abdullah. His older brother Muhammad Hussein, formerly known as Maniam Sugumaran (born c. 1958), had earlier converted to Islam after marrying a Muslim woman in Sabah. His younger brother Shangalingam (born c. 1980) remained a Hindu. Despite his conversion to Islam, Moorthy remained uncircumcised, still took part in Hindu festivals, ate pork, and drank alcohol; he appeared on television on 31 October 2005, being interviewed about his celebration of Deepavali. On 11 November 2005, he fell from his wheelchair, injuring his head and entering into a coma from which he would never recover.

== Death and court case ==
Moorthy died at 11.10 AM on 20 December 2005 in the Intensive Care Unit of the Kuala Lumpur Hospital, which he had entered after doctors noticed he was having difficulty breathing. He was only 36 at the time of his death. His widow filed for a court order to claim his body on 21 December, but when she went to claim it, the hospital refused to release it in accordance with a 22 December Syariah Court ruling that Moorthy had converted to Islam before his death, given in response to an ex parte application by the Federal Territory Islamic Religious Council. The Syariah Court heard testimony from Moorthy's army colleagues, but his wife ignored a subpoena and did not appear in court to offer any testimony.

A fight broke out at the hospital when about 50 people began to shout abusive language at Moorthy's family; the situation was brought under control by military police.

In response to the Syariah Court ruling, Moorthy's wife through M. Manoharan filed her own application with the High Court seeking an order that the hospital hand over her husband's body. As a result, the hospital decided to retain the body rather than release it to the Islamic Affairs Department, on the advice of their legal adviser in the Ministry of Health. More than one hundred people came to the court gallery on the morning of 28 December to hear the judge's verdict. The High Court dismissed the application, stating it had no jurisdiction to determine whether Moorthy had converted to Islam, because the Syariah High Court had already ruled on the matter. Upon receipt of the ruling, the hospital released his body to the Federal Territory Islamic Affairs Department, which buried him in the Taman Ibukota Muslim Cemetery in Gombak, Selangor that afternoon. Security was heavy at his funeral, and his family did not attend, with the exception of his elder brother Mohammad Hussein.

Moorthy was posthumously promoted to the rank of sergeant in recognition of his service to the nation, with the promotion backdated to June 2005. His widow received a death benefit of RM110,000, and continues to receive his sergeant's pension of RM947.33 per month. Though under Islamic inheritance law, his elder brother, as the immediate family's only practising Muslim, had the right to claim this benefit, he agreed to sign a written undertaking giving up all his stake in it, so that Moorthy's widow and child could receive the full amount. The Armed Forces urged the private sector to provide his wife with a job; in 2007, she was 32 years old and reported by American magazine Time to be working as an office cleaner.

== Response to the case ==
On 31 January 2006, Kaliammal petitioned the Court of Appeal to declare that the High Court had erred in its earlier decision which concluded it had no jurisdiction to determine the validity of conversions to Islam. She had been hoping to exhume the body and perform a Hindu cremation. The court announced on 20 June 2006 that they would render a decision in September; however, they emphasised that their ruling would only concern the matter of the civil High Court's jurisdiction, and that they would not rule on whether Moorthy was a practising Hindu at the time of his death.

The Syariah Lawyers Association criticised the Federal Territory Islamic Religious Council for the original case, stating that it was improper for them to have filed an ex parte application at the Syariah High Court on the matter. The day after the funeral, Reverend Wong Kim Kong, secretary-general of the National Evangelical Christian Fellowship (NECF), also said, "We are uneasy. We are uncomfortable. We are feeling threatened." He added, "We are concerned that Syariah may one day be the supreme law of the land." Anwar Ibrahim, the former deputy Prime Minister who finished serving a corruption sentence in September 2004, pointed to the Moorthy case as an example of the government stifling non-Muslims' rights. One advocacy group for religious minorities said the verdict "showed the Islamic court is inconsistent in its protection of religious minorities", comparing the case to that of Wong Ah Kiu, also known as Nyonya binti Tahir, an ethnic Malay woman born as a Muslim but raised in a Chinese Buddhist family, whose children received permission from a Negeri Sembilan court to bury her as a Buddhist less than a month after the Moorthy case. The case also attracted attention in India, where the Vishva Hindu Parishad filed a protest with the Malaysian High Commissioner, denouncing the burial as a violation of human rights.

== See also ==
- Status of religious freedom in Malaysia
