= Munisamy =

Munisamy may refer to:

- Magendran Munisamy Malaysian mountain climber
- Munisamy Thambidurai Indian politician
