= Sky Kingdom =

Former religious sect based in Besut, Malaysia

Sky Kingdom Malay: Kerajaan Langit
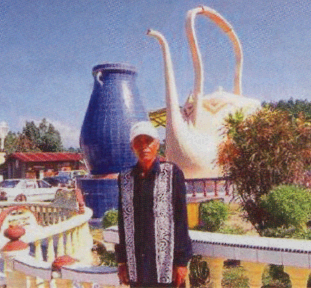
- An image of the Sky Kingdom compound showing the large teapot and the vase prior to its demolition, with Ayah Pin in the foreground
- Type: New Religious Movement
- Classification: Syncretic
- Orientation: Abrahamic and Dharmic-influenced
- Region: Malaysia
- Headquarters: Besut, Terengganu (formerly)
- Founder: Ayah Pin
- Origin: mid-1980s Besut, Terengganu, Malaysia
- Members: 22,800 to 7,000 (late 2000s)

Sky Kingdom (Malay: Kerajaan Langit) was a Malaysian religious commune and sect founded by Ariffin Mohammed, also known as Ayah Pin (Father Pin). The commune, based in Besut, Terengganu, was demolished by the government of Malaysia in August 2005. As of 2006, Ayah Pin was residing in exile in Narathiwat, Thailand, just over the border from Kelantan. Eighteen members of the Sky Kingdom commune remain at the mercy of the Malaysia's Higher Shariah Court, with 40 having received leniency upon renouncing the group.

Sky Kingdom attracted worldwide mass media attention in mid-2005 over concerns about efforts by the Malaysian government to suppress its followers as apostates from Islam. The controversy brought to light the issue of whether sharia law superseded the right to religious freedom under Article 11 of the Constitution of Malaysia. This attention was coupled with considerable bemusement over followers' central objects of veneration, which include a large cream-coloured teapot, prompting local and foreign media to dub the sect as the "teapot cult".

== Sky Kingdom commune ==
The 6-acre (2.4 ha), 33-building complex was located near the village of Kampung Batu 13, Hulu Besut, in the Besut district in northern Terengganu (some 400 km northeast of Kuala Lumpur and 20 km south of Besut's most populous settlement, Jerteh). Sky Kingdom had existed on the site since the mid-1980s, though the group itself dates back to the late 1970s. Before the commune was demolished, the group supported itself through rubber tapping, religious tourism, and confectionery production.

=== Symbols ===
The commune features some structures which are symbolic of the group's ideology. Some notable symbols include a two-story high cream coloured teapot with a similarly-sized blue vase, costing RM 45 million. The teapot is said to symbolise the purity of water and "love pouring from heaven". It is the earthly model of a celestial prototype. According to Ayah Pin, it was inspired by the dreams of one of his followers, and reflects a similar vessel in the sky which God uses to shower his blessings on mankind. Followers who visit the commune for the first time have to drink holy water from the vase which is perpetually filled by the teapot.

Another notable feature in the compound is an equally large yellow umbrella, which offers "a place for people to take shelter beneath God." It is said that this can also be associated with the nine planets in Hinduism."

Other symbols present include an ornamental fishing boat, identified with Noah's Ark, and a crescent moon icon symbolising people without a religion, including the Orang Asli (indigenous peoples of peninsular Malaysia) and the aforementioned Orang Bunian.

== History ==
Ayah Pin, the leader and founder of Sky Kingdom, was born in 1941 in Beris, Kampung Besar Bachok, Kelantan. In 1953, Ayah Pin became seriously ill and he claimed that an angel had visited him. Twenty years later, the angel returned and Ariffin began his spiritual career. In 1975 a spiritual group was formed in Bagan Lebai Tahir, Butterworth, Penang. Whether Ariffin was the founder is unclear; during this phase he may have been a follower of Hassan Ya'acob (also known as Hassan Anak Rimau), another claimant to divinity.

In the mid-1980s, the Sky Kingdom commune was formed on its present site in Besut. Some reports state the Office of Islamic Affairs declared the group to be deviant at this time. In 1995, Sky Kingdom's signature building projects began, in accordance with divine revelation. Two years later, the local Religious Affairs Council (Jawatankuasa Fatwa Majlis Agama Islam dan Adat Melayu Terengganu) issued a fatwa against the group. About this time, four adherents were arrested for the crime of renouncing Islam, but they were later freed since as ex-Muslims Malaysia's sharia court no longer has jurisdiction over them.

In 2001 Ayah Pin himself renounced Islam. The Sharia court accused him of contravening Section 25 of the Enakmen Pentadbiran Hal Ehwal Agama Islam 1986 (Administration of Islamic Religious Affairs 1986), stating that his teachings and beliefs were "false, deviant, corrupting and threatening to the public peace" (membawa ancaman kepada ketenteraman orang awam serta merosakkan akidah). He pleaded guilty to a charge of "belittling Islam" (menghina Islam), and was jailed for 11 months and fined RM 2,900. The Religious Affairs Office hoped that Ariffin's arrest would prevent the movement's growth. However, the Sky Kingdom continued to attract new followers from university students and Orang Asli.

On 18 July 2005, a group of masked vigilantes attacked the group's headquarters, smashing windows and torching buildings. Two days later, 58 Sky Kingdom followers were arrested, and on 31 July three of Ariffin's four wives were arrested in Kelantan. Ariffin escaped capture. Forty-five of his followers face the charge of failing to observe the government fatwa by continuing to be "members of a sect declared deviant", which carries a fine up to RM 3,000 or two years in prison. One of those arrested faced an additional charge of "humiliating Islam" for claiming no longer to be a Muslim.

Court cases will revolve around the right of religious freedom, which is theoretically guaranteed by the Malaysian constitution.

On 1 August 2005, officials of the Besut Land Office destroyed Sky Kingdom's buildings, citing Section 129 of the National Land Code, which punishes unauthorised construction with land confiscation. The titular landowner is Ariffin's first wife, who failed to appear in court for a hearing on the ownership. At a 1 September 2005, hearing, a trial date for the 45 followers accused of violating the government fatwa was set for three days beginning 18 December. All of the accused are represented by Wan Haidi Wan Jusoh of Ubaidullah Aziz and Company, who unsuccessfully petitioned the court to order his name blacked out by the media. The Sky Kingdom had previously had great difficulty obtaining legal representation, presumably because of attorneys' fears of reprisals or negative publicity.

As of 2007, after wide media coverage, the original Hulu Besut commune, now containing only 24 members, had reportedly chosen a new leader—a former police chief inspector in his 30s. The group is suspicious of visitors, and routinely turns out the commune's lights when a car approaches at night so as not to be found.

== In popular culture ==
The Sky Kingdom commune was featured in a documentary titled Massacre Survivors: Malaysia's Secret Sect produced by SBS News and distributed by Journeyman Pictures. The documentary's video can be seen on Journeyman's YouTube channel. The documentary later become an internet meme in Malaysia.

== See also ==
- Freedom of religion in Malaysia
- List of people claimed to be Jesus
- List of Buddha claimants
- List of Mahdi claimants
- List of messiah claimants
