= Wong Ah Kiu =

- 黄亞嬌
- Born: 1918; Alor Gajah, Malacca, Straits Settlements
- Died: January 19, 2006 (aged 87–88); Tampin, Negeri Sembilan
- Spouse: Chiang Meng (張明)
- Children: 13, including: Chiang Ah Fatt (張亞發); Chiang Kwang Ying

Chinese name
- Traditional Chinese: 黃亞嬌
- Simplified Chinese: 黄亚娇
- Hanyu Pinyin: Huáng Yà Jiāo
- Jyutping: Wong4 Aa3 Giu1
- Hokkien POJ: N̂g A-kiau

Wong Ah Kiu (1918 – 19 January 2006), legally known as Nyonya binti Tahir, was a Malaysian woman born to a Muslim family but raised Buddhist. The court case which arose after her death over whether she should receive an Islamic funeral or a Buddhist one brought up various issues regarding freedom of religion in Malaysia.

== Marriage and family ==
Wong was born in Simpang Ampat, Malacca. Of mixed Chinese and ethnic Malay descent, she was taken in by her grandmother, a Malay Muslim married to a Chinese of Hainan origin who had converted to Islam; however, she was later adopted by a Chinese family and raised as a Buddhist. In 1936, Wong married Chiang Meng, a Chinese man sixteen years her senior; he did not convert to Islam, and Wong herself continued to practise Buddhism. According to her children, she adopted the Chinese way of life and ate pork. Her children were also raised as Chinese, and their ethnicity was recorded as such on their identity cards. However, her own identity card recorded her ethnicity as Malay. In 1986, she made an application to have her change of name and religion recorded on her own identity card; in response to this application, she was investigated by the Alor Gajah Islamic Affairs office, who issued a report on 7 May 1986 on the basis of which her application was denied. Her husband died in 1989 at the age of 87; knowing that she would be unable to be buried next to him without legal recognition of her status as a Buddhist, she filed two further applications for recognition of her change of religion in 1991 and 1998; these too were rejected. She left behind a written declaration that she was a Buddhist and wanted to be given a Buddhist rather than an Islamic funeral.

== Death and court case ==
Wong died on 19 January 2006, a Thursday, at the age of 88 at her home in Taman Indah. When her family went to the local police office to file a notice of death, the officer on duty was reportedly confused by the fact that the identity card of the deceased identified her as a Malay and a Muslim, while her family were Chinese and Buddhist. He later informed his superior, who contacted the Negeri Sembilan Religious Affairs Department. The Religious Affairs Department had the Tampin Syariah Court issue an injunction to put her burial on hold when they found out she was Malay; the Negeri Sembilan Islamic Affairs Council and Negeri Sembilan Islamic Affairs Department then filed an ex parte application with the Syariah High Court in Seremban the next day regarding her burial. The head of the Negeri Sembilan Religious Affairs Department came to her family's house in person to present the order that she be buried in the Muslim fashion. However, the court, having heard testimony from her children that she lived and died as a Buddhist, ruled on the following Monday that Wong was a non-Muslim when she died, and permitted her family to proceed with Buddhist funeral rites. Wong was buried next to her husband in the Chinese cemetery in her birthplace of Simpang Ampat, Alor Gajah.

The case marked the first time that non-Muslims had testified in a Syariah court in Malaysia; though non-Muslims are not permitted to initiate cases in Syariah courts, there had never been any official bar to their offering testimony. Religious minorities were reportedly relieved by the decision, but one advocacy group stated that the decision showed that the courts were "inconsistent in [their] protection" of non-Muslims. Furthermore, although the Syariah Court ruled in favour of Wong's family, Honey Tan, a spokeswoman for civil society group Article 11, criticised the decision, stating that "the court has not provided just remedies to the grievances raised by the plaintiffs on constitutional grounds". Her case marked the beginning of a trend in which religious authorities would ask family members of deceased individuals who had allegedly converted away from Islam to go to the courts to obtain a ruling on whether the deceased was a Muslim or not. Later commentators attributed the favourable outcome to the family's attitude of co-operation with the court, contrasting the ruling with that given on M. Moorthy, a member of the first Malaysian team to scale Mount Everest. Moorthy, who was raised Hindu but allegedly converted to Islam without the knowledge of his family, was buried as a Muslim; his family reportedly ignored a subpoena issued by their local Syariah Court.

== See also ==
- Buddhism in Malaysia
- Freedom of religion in Malaysia
- Lina Joy
