= Lina Joy =

Malaysian convert from Islam

- Born: Azlina Jailani; 28 July 1964 (age 61); Malaysia
- Known for: Court Challenge regarding Religious Conversion

Lina Joy is a Malay convert from Islam to Christianity. Born Azlina Jailani on 28 July 1964 in Malaysia to Muslim parents of Javanese descent, she converted at age 26. The Lina Joy case sparked a debate about apostasy in Malaysia, and her failed legal attempt to not have her religion listed as "Islam" on her identity card is considered a landmark case in Malaysia.

== Court case ==
Lina Joy lwn. Majlis Agama Islam Wilayah Persekutuan & Yang Lain
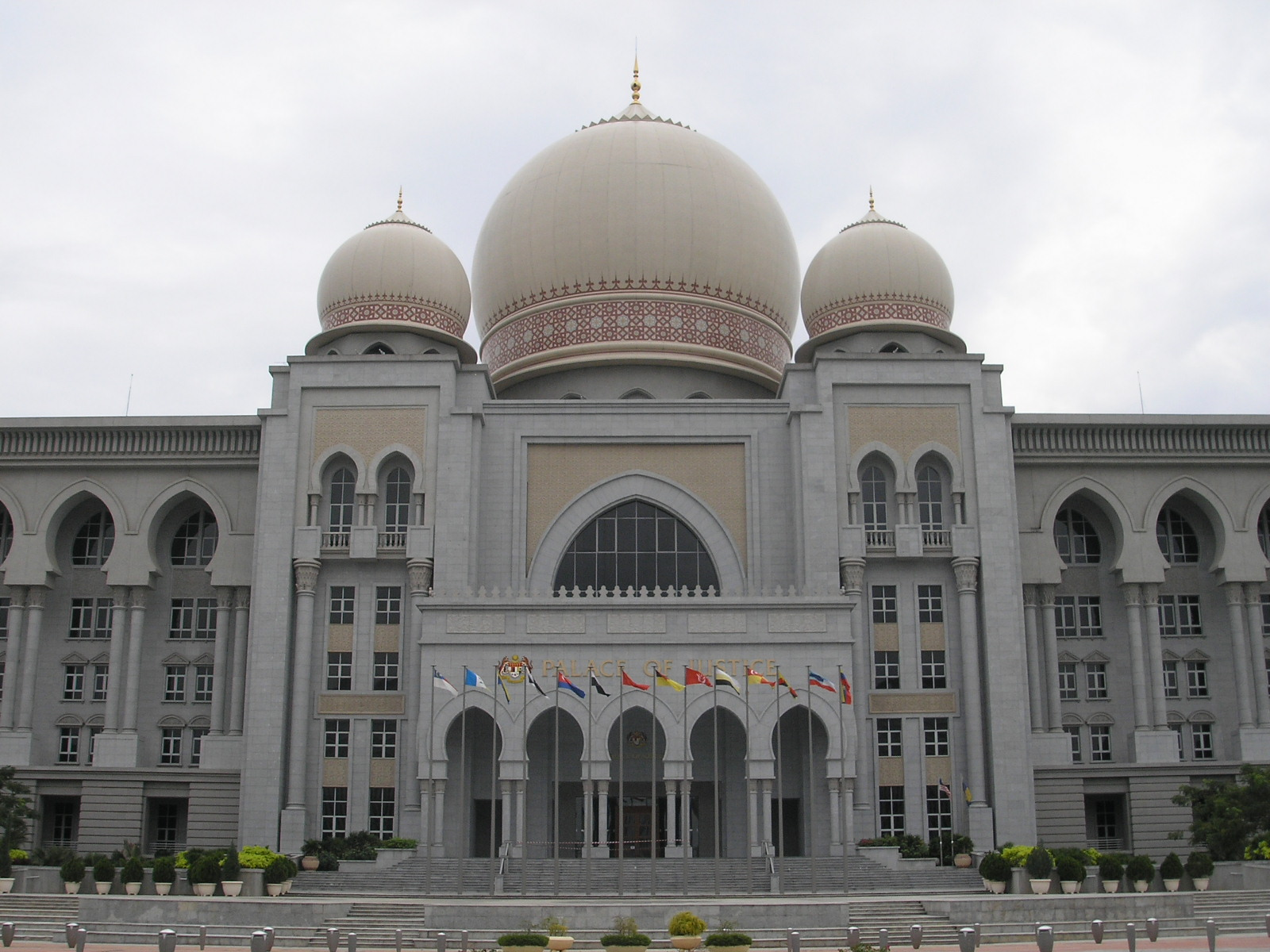
- Court: Federal Court of Malaysia
- Decided: 30 May 2007
- Docket nos.: 01-2-2006 (W)
- Citations: [2007] 3 CLJ 557, [2007] 1 MLRA 359

Case history
- Prior actions: Lina Joy v. Majlis Agama Islam Wilayah Persekutuan & Ors [2005] 2 MLRA 271 (Court of Appeal of Malaysia) (Appeal dismissed); Lina Joy v. Majlis Agama Islam Wilayah Persekutuan & Anor [2001] 5 MLRH 718 (High court of Malaya) (Application dismissed)
- Appealed from: Court of Appeal of Malaysia

Questions presented
- Whether National Registration Department has the right to impose condition for the appellant to produce a certificate or declaration issued by the Syariah Court that certified she has left Islam, before deleting the word "Islam" from her identity card? Whether the National Registration Department is correct in interpreting its powers under the National Registration Regulations 1990 to impose the aforementioned condition to the appellant, even though it is not clearly stated in the 1990 regulations? Whether Soon Singh Bikar Singh v. Pertubuhan Kebajikam Islam Malaysia (PERKIM) Kedah & Anor [1999] 2 CLJ 5 is correctly decided?

Court membership
- Judges sitting: Ahmad Fairuz Abdul Halim; Alauddin Mohd Sheriff; Richard Malanjum

Case opinions
- Majority: Ahmad Fairuz Abdul Halim; Alauddin Mohd Sheriff
- Dissent: Richard Malanjum

Keywords
- Apostasy; Constitution of Malaysia; freedom of religion; Islam; judicial review; Malaysian identity card; religious conversion; Syariah Court

Area of law
- Administrative law; Constitutional law; Islamic law; Statutory interpretation

In 1998, Joy was baptised and applied to have her conversion legally recognised by the Malaysian courts. Though her change of name was recognised in 1999 and so noted on her identity card, her change of religion was not (for lack of a Syariah Court confirmation document). For this reason, she filed suit with the High Court in 1999, bypassing the Syariah court. She later filed suit with the Federal Court in 2006. Joy hopes to live openly as a Christian; she was forced to go into hiding by the publicity surrounding her case.

In a majority verdict delivered on 30 May 2007, the Federal Court rejected her appeal. Her appeal was dismissed 2-1 by Chief Justice Tun Ahmad Fairuz Sheikh Abdul Halim and Datuk Alauddin Mohd Sheriff. The ruling stated that "a person who wanted to renounce their religion must do so according to existing laws or practices of the particular religion. Only after the person has complied with the requirements and the authorities are satisfied that the person has apostatised can they embrace Christianity... In other words, a person cannot at one's whims and fancies renounce or embrace a religion."

The dissenting Chief Judge of Sabah and Sarawak Datuk Richard Malanjum wrote that "Hence, in my view this is tantamount to unequal treatment under the law. In other words it is discriminatory and unconstitutional and should therefore be struck down. For this reason alone, the relief sought for by the appellant should be granted, namely for a declaration that she is entitled to have an identity card in which the word 'Islam' does not appear."

Legal recognition would have allowed her to have the change of religion noted on her national identity card. It would also remove the legal barrier to her marrying her Christian fiancé (marriage between Muslim women and non-Muslim men is forbidden under Malaysian law and under the Shariah/Islamic Jurisprudence; the non-Muslim man is required to convert to Islam under Malaysian law; Under Shariah, Muslim men are only allowed to marry Muslims or People of the Book, those who adhere to Abrahamic religions that pre-date Islam, however with conditions and restrictions). In Malaysia, the Shariah Court alone has the power to deal with Islamic issues, including legal recognition for conversion to and from Islam. Conversely, the Shariah Court has no jurisdiction over those who are not Muslims. Joy, by her own admission, is no longer Muslim, but only the Shariah Court can legally recognise this. Conversion is not something unknown, and according to Muslim Lawyers Association spokesman Pawanchek Merican, "...in Negeri Sembilan, the Syariah court allowed 16 people to renounce Islam."

According to a senior official in the National Registration Department (NRD), for the NRD to change the religion on her identity card would mean that the department would be officially declaring her an apostate, which falls under the jurisdiction of the Shariah Court. The jurisdiction of the Syariah court over converts from Islam to other religions has been hotly debated by the Malaysian public in the past few years, with this and other court cases involving converts closely followed by the media. Joy is not the first person to apply for recognition of conversion from Islam. Another woman named only as "Maria" by the BBC is also pursuing a similar case. In 2006, the Negeri Sembilan Syariah High Court in Seremban granted recognition for the conversion from Islam to Buddhism of Wong Ah Kiu (also known as Nyonya Tahir). However, being raised by a Chinese Buddhist family despite her Malay origins, Wong had never practised Islam in her life and was deceased at the time of the ruling.

== See also ==
- Apostasy in Islam
- Freedom of religion in Malaysia
- Christianity in Malaysia
- Conversion to Christianity
