= Malaysian Consultative Council of Buddhism, Christianity, Hinduism, Sikhism and Taoism =

Malaysian non-profit organization

- Majlis Perundingan Malaysia Agama Buddha, Kristian, Hindu, Sikh dan Tao
- Abbreviation: MCCBCHST
- Formation: 1983
- Legal status: Non-profit interfaith organisation in Malaysia
- Purpose: To acts as a consultative and liaison body the main non-Muslim faith communities in Malaysia.
- Headquarters: 123, Jalan Berhala, Brickfields, 50470 Kuala Lumpur, Malaysia.
- Region served: Malaysia
- Website: Official website
- Remarks: Malaysian Consultative Council of Buddhism, Christianity, Hinduism, Sikhism and Taoism on Facebook

The Malaysian Consultative Council of Buddhism, Christianity, Hinduism, Sikhism and Taoism (Malay: Majlis Perundingan Malaysia Agama Buddha, Kristian, Hindu, Sikh dan Tao; abbrev: MCCBCHST) is a non-profit interfaith organization in Malaysia. Initially formed in 1983 as the "Malaysian Consultative Council of Buddhism, Christianity, Hinduism and Sikhism", it is composed primarily of officials from the main non-Muslim faith communities in Malaysia and acts as a consultative and liaison body towards more open dialogue and co-operation. It prioritizes round-table dialogue as its principal means towards conflict resolution amongst all Malaysians, irrespective of creed, religion, race, culture, or gender. In 2006, Taoists were officially represented for the first time in the organization and the name was changed to the current form in their Annual General Meeting on 27 September of the same year. Their current vision is represented through the slogan "Many Faiths, One Nation."

== Mission ==
The Malaysian Consultative Council of Buddhism currently describes their aims and objectives through seven different subsets.

== Composition ==
The Malaysian Consultative Council of Buddhism, Christianity, Hinduism, Sikhism, and Taoism is composed of representative member bodies within each respective religion.

Buddhism is represented by the Malaysian Buddhist Association (MBA), Buddhist Missionary Society Malaysia (BMSM) and the Sasana Wardhana Society (SAWS).

Christianity is represented by the Christian Federation of Malaysia (CFM) [incorporating the Catholic Bishops Conference of Malaysia (CBCM), Council of Churches of Malaysia (CCM) and National Evangelical Christian Fellowship (NECF)].

Hinduism is represented by the Malaysia Hindu Sangam (MHS).

Sikhism is represented by the Malaysian Gurdwaras Council (MGC), Khalsa Diwan Malaysia (KDM), and Sikh Naujawan Sabha Malaysia (SNSM).

Taoism is represented by the Federation of Taoist Associations MALAYSIA (FTAM).

== Leadership ==
The 2019-2021 executive board for the Malaysian Consultative Council of Buddhism, Christianity, Hinduism, Sikhism, and Taoism:

Archbishop Julian Leow Beng Kim President	Christian Federation Malaysia (CFM)
Sardar Jagir Singh Deputy President	Malaysian Gurdwaras Council (MGC)
Datuk Mohan Shanmugam Vice President	Malaysia Hindu Sangam (MHS)
Daozhang Tan Hoe Chieow Vice President	Federation of Taoist Associations Malaysia (FTAM)
Ven Sing Kan Vice President	Malaysia Buddhist Association (MBA)
Ms Gowri PS Thangaya Hon Secretary General	Malaysia Hindu Sangam (MHS)
Rev. Dr. Hermen Shastri Hon Assistant Secretary General	Council of Churches Malaysia (CCM)
Mr. Prematilaka KD Serisena Hon Treasurer General	Sasana Abhiwurdhi Wardhana Society
Mr Tan Mee Tak Hon Assistant Treasurer General	Federation of Taoist Associations Malaysia (FTAM)
Ms Sally Chee Exco Member	Malaysia Buddhist Association (MBA)
Ms Loh Pai Ling Exco Member	Buddhist Missionary Society Malaysia (MBA)
Rev Andy Chi Cheng Khee Exco Member	National Evangelical Christian Fellowship (NECW)
Mr Tan Kong Beng Exco Member	Christian Federation Malaysia (CFM)
Rev Dr Fr Clarance Devadas Exco Member	Christian Federation Malaysia (CFM)
Mr Ganesan Thangavellu Exco Member	Malaysia Hindu Sangam (MHS)
Mr Balakrishnan Parasuraman Exco Member	Malaysia Hindu Sangam (MHS)
Sardar Darshan Singh Exco Member	Malaysian Gurdwaras Council (MGC)
Sardar Bhag Singh Sandhu Exco Member	Khalsa Diwan Malaysia (KDM)
Sardar Jagjit Singh Exco Member	Sikh Naujawan Sabha Malaysia (SNSM)
Daozhang Lau Chean Kiat Exco Member	Federation of Taoist Associations Malaysia (FTAM)
Mr Teh Hieng Chie Exco Member	Federation of Taoist Associations Malaysia (FTAM)

== Recognition ==
In May 2020, the World Health Organization (WHO) partnered with the MCCBHST and other faith-based organizations in Malaysia to commemorate Wesak Day. The WHO worked closely with the MCCBHST to devise a set of six simple, positive tips depicting small family group worshipping and safe temple-based activities for the COVID-19 pandemic. Venerable Sing Kan, Vice President of the MCCBHST, was quoted by the WHO in response to a movement control order that was issued by the Malaysian Government to regulate the celebration. He stated, "The conditional movement control order raised a lot of questions about Wesak Day - what we could and couldn't do, what were safe alternatives to gathering and festivities during this Holy Day, and most importantly how could we keep ourselves and families safe from COVID-19."

On 12 May 2021, the U.S. Department of State Office of International Religious Freedom released the 2020 Report on International Religious Freedom: Malaysia. Section III, Status of Societal Respect for Religious Freedom, directly quoted a press statement made by the MCCBHST in September 2020. The report expressed the MCCBHST's "grave concern on the escalation of religious animosity between religious groups manufactured by some politicians to divide and rule."

== See also ==
- Freedom of religion in Malaysia
