= Ayah Pin =

Founder of Malaysian new religious movement Sky Kingdom

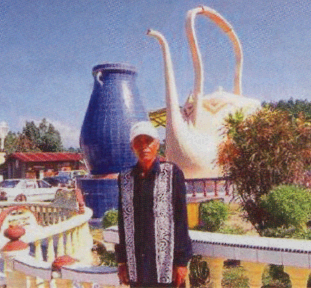
- Ayah Pin standing in front of the large teapot and the vase in the Sky Kingdom compound prior to its demolition.
- Born: Ariffin Mohammed; June 22, 1941; Beris, Bachok, Kelantan, Unfederated Malay States (now Malaysia)
- Died: April 22, 2016 (aged 74); Kampung Batu 13, Besut, Terengganu, Malaysia
- Occupations: Cult leader, founder of Sky Kingdom
- Spouses: Che Minah Ramli (died 2012): Jaharah Awang; Rozilan Mokhtar; Nik Kamariah Nik Pah
- Children: 21
- Relatives: Abdul Rahman Mohammed (brother)

Ariffin Mohammed (22 June 1941 – 22 April 2016), better known as Ayah Pin (Father Pin), was a Malaysian cult leader and founder of the Sky Kingdom (Malay: Kerajaan Langit) religious sect. His movement had a commune based in Besut, Terengganu, which was demolished by the Malaysian government in August 2005. He claimed to have direct contact with the heavens and was believed by his followers to be the reincarnation of Jesus, the Buddha, Shiva, and Muhammad. Devotees of the Sky Kingdom believe that one day, Ayah Pin will return as the Mahdi. In addition, he was considered the king of the sky, and the supreme object of devotion for all religions.

== Personal life ==
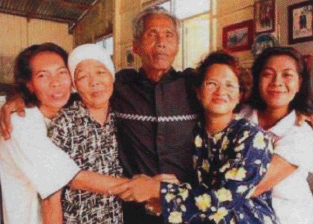
Ayah Pin with his four wives

Ayah Pin was born as Ariffin Mohammed on 22 June 1941 into a Muslim Malay family in Beris Kubor Besar, Bachok, Kelantan. His parents were Mohammed Merah and Saadiah Yaacob, both of whom were menial workers. He had a younger brother named Abdul Rahman.

Ayah Pin was illiterate, attending primary school until Year 2 following his family's financial problems. He was also involved in small part-time businesses, eventually working in scrap iron and buffalo trading, and even worked as a sub-contractor.

Ayah Pin had four wives and 21 children, 11 sons and 10 daughters. He also had 83 grandchildren and 34 great-grandchildren. His first wife, Che Minah Ramli died in 2012. He later married an 18-year-old woman. After he remarried, he suffered from a stroke.

== Spiritual career ==
In 1953, Ayah Pin became seriously ill and he alleged that an angel [sic] visited him. Twenty years later, the angel returned and he began his spiritual career. Whether Ayah Pin was the founder is unclear, but during this phase, he may have been a follower of Hassan Yaacob (also known as Anak Rimau), apparently another claimant to divinity.

After Hassan died, Ayah Pin and his four wives developed the Sky Kingdom teachings. Since then, he managed to gather many followers. The Sky Kingdom does not believe in a doomsday and Ayah Pin allegedly would become the Prime Minister in the afterlife.

Around the mid-1980s, the Sky Kingdom commune was formed in Besut. Some reports state that the Office of Islamic Affairs declared the group to be deviant at this time. In 1995, the Sky Kingdom's signature building projects began, as per divine revelation. Two years later, the Terrenganu Local Religious Affairs council (Jawatankuasa Fatwa Majlis Agama Islam dan Adat Melayu Terengganu) issued a fatwa against the group. Around this time, four adherents were arrested for renouncing Islam, but they were later freed on the grounds that as ex-Muslims, Malaysia's Sharia court no longer enjoys jurisdiction over them.

In 2001, Ayah Pin renounced Islam. The Sharia court accused him of contravening Section 25 of the Enakmen Pentadbiran Hal Ehwal Agama Islam, 1986 (Administration of Islamic Religious Affairs, 1986), stating that his teachings and beliefs were false, deviant, corrupting, and threatening to public peace (membawa ancaman kepada ketenteraman orang awam serta merosakkan akidah). He pleaded guilty to the charge of "insulting Islam" (menghina Islam), and was jailed for 11 months and fined RM 2,900. The Religious Affairs Office hoped that Ayah Pin's arrest would prevent the Sky Kingdom's growth. However, the movement continued to attract new followers, mostly from university students and the Orang Asli.

On 18 July 2005, a group of masked vigilantes vandalised the Sky Kingdom's headquarters, smashing windows and torching buildings. Two days later, 58 followers were arrested, and on 31 July, three of Ayah Pin's four wives were also arrested in Kelantan. Ayah Pin escaped arrest and became a fugitive wanted by the Malaysian authorities. Forty-five members face charges of failing to observe the government fatwa (i.e. for continuing to be members of a sect declared as deviant), which carries a fine of up to RM 3,000 or two years in prison. One of those arrested faced an additional charge of "insulting Islam". Court cases promise to revolve around the issue of religious freedom, which is theoretically guaranteed by the Malaysian constitution.

On 1 August 2005, officials of the Besut Land and District Office destroyed the Sky Kingdom's various buildings, citing Section 129 of the National Land Code (which punishes unauthorised construction with land confiscation). The titular landowner is Ayah Pin's first wife, who apparently failed to appear in court for a hearing on the matter. On 1 September 2005, at a hearing, a trial date for 45 followers accused of violating the government fatwa was set for three days beginning 18 December that year. All of the accused were represented by Wan Haidi Wan Yusoh of Ubaidullah Aziz and Co., who unsuccessfully petitioned the court to order his name blacked out by the media. The group had previously experienced great difficulty in attracting legal representation, presumably owing to attorneys' fear of reprisals or negative publicity.

As of 2007, after wide media coverage, the original Hulu Besut commune, now down to 24 members, had reportedly chosen a new leader, who turned out to be a former police chief inspector in his 30s. The group is suspicious of visitors, and routinely turns off the commune's lights whenever a car approaches at night in order to conceal itself. From 2009 onwards, Ayah Pin was believed to have been residing in exile in Narathiwat, Thailand until his death.

== Death ==
On 22 April 2016, Ayah Pin died at the home of his third wife, Che Jaharah Awang, in Kampung Batu 13, Hulu Besut due to natural causes. He was 74 years old. Prior to his death, it was reported that he had been suffering from various illnesses since fleeing from the authorities in 2005. His remains were laid to rest at Batu 13 Cemetery, Hulu Besut, Kuala Terengganu.

== See also ==
- List of people claimed to be Jesus
- List of Buddha claimants
- List of Mahdi claimants
- List of messiah claimants
- Freedom of religion in Malaysia
- Messiah complex
