= Freedom of religion in Malaysia =

The Constitution of Malaysia establishes a right to freedom of religion in Article 11. However, Islam is also established as the state religion of the country in article 3, and article 11 provides for legal restrictions on proselytizing to Muslims. According to Freedom House, the country was scored 1 out of 4 for freedom of religion, with 0 being the worst and 4 being the best, in 2023.

Muslims themselves are subject to state enforcement of religious observance, where the government can issue fines or legal penalties for failing to perform praying and fasting, or engaging in premarital sex. In addition, ethnic Malays are legally mandated that they must be a Muslim and are strictly prohibited from converting to other faiths. A Muslim must also be a Sunni, with being a Shia officially banned and unrecognised. While other religious communities represent a significant portion of the population, those who identify with atheist, agnostic, or other irreligious life stances are rare, as open hostility and state-sanctioned pressure make such positions difficult.

== Religious demography ==
As of the 2020 Population and Housing Census, 63.5% of the population practices Islam; 18.7% Buddhism; 9.1% Christianity; 6.1% Hinduism; and 2.7% other or no religion. Other faiths include Animism, Folk religion, Sikhism and Baháʼí Faith.

However, these figures may be misleading as professing the religion of Islam is a requirement for being a Malay in the sense of the Malaysian Constitution. Moreover, Muslims who wish to leave Islam face strong disincentives.

== Scope of Islamic law in Malaysia ==
The nation maintains two parallel justice systems in the country (see: Courts of Malaysia). One is the secular justice system based upon laws gazetted by Parliament. The other is sharia (syariah, Islamic law). Ostensibly Syariah Courts only have jurisdiction over persons who declare themselves to be Muslims. Consequently, this results in non-Muslims not having legal standing in Syariah Courts.

Non-Muslims can seek recourse from a Syariah court decision in the secular courts, which could overrule the Syariah courts. Syariah courts are limited in their jurisdiction by Article 121 of the Federal constitution. In 2006 a judge ruled that Article 121 limited the federal courts from ruling on matters ruled on by the Syariah court when it touches Islamic matters. This was seen as a misinterpretation of the article by some, and the case is under appeal in the court of appeals.

The rules of sharia are set by the various sultans of the states. Historically a sultan had absolute authority over the state. Prior to independence, Tunku Abdul Rahman managed to convince the sultans to cede some states' powers to the federal government. One of the terms of this agreement is that the sultans still are the ultimate authority of Islamic law in their respective states. The same arrangement was long held even during British colonial rule. In Selangor, the Selangor Non-Islamic Religions (Control of Propagation Among Muslims) Enactment 1988 was signed by the Sultan of Selangor into law forbidding non-Muslims from using the word "Allah" in a public context. Lawmakers have claimed that this enactment is contrary to the federal constitution.

Constitutionally (in Article 160 of the Constitution of Malaysia), one of the four tests for entitlement to the privileges accorded to a Malaysian Malay is that one must be a Muslim. The rationale for this is that Islam is considered intrinsic to Malay ethnic identity, which culturally and historically is ruled by a Sultan who is a Muslim. Another test is that one must follow the Malay culture. Controversially, court rulings have assumed that all ethnic Malays must automatically satisfy this constitutional definition of a Malaysian Malay, and have therefore concluded that they must satisfy all of its requirements, so they have to be Muslim.

On 29 September 2001, the then Prime Minister, Mahathir Mohamad declared that the country was an Islamic state (negara Islam). The opposition leader at the time, Lim Kit Siang, is now actively seeking support to declare Mahathir's move as unconstitutional by repeatedly clarifying that Malaysia is a secular state with Islam as its official religion as enshrined in the Constitution. However, the coalition government headed by Mahathir at the time held more than two-thirds of the seats in parliament. A two-thirds majority vote in Parliament is required for constitutional amendments in Malaysia.

== Status of religious freedom ==
Government in general supports Islamic religious establishment and it is the official policy to "infuse Islamic values" into the administration of the country.

However, Sunday which is the Christian traditional holiday is the official weekend holiday in the Federal Territories and ten out of thirteen states, unlike practices in Middle Eastern Muslim countries. The exception are the states of Johor, Kedah, Kelantan and Terengganu, where the weekend falls on Friday and Saturday. Although on 29 December 2024, Johor reverted back to Saturday and Sunday weekend holiday that would be started on 1 January 2025. Most Muslims in Malaysia accept this, although some have expressed disquiet since the most holy period in a Muslim's week is between Thursday evening and Friday afternoon, when the congregational Jumaat prayer is held. The practice of having Sunday as the weekend holiday is a departure from traditional Islamic practices, dating to British colonial days when the British started bringing in non-Muslim immigrants into the country.

In May 2001, the government decided not to approve the Falun Gong Preparatory Committee's application to register as a legal organisation. This action is believed to be more related to the government's wish to improve relations with China rather than an attempt to undermine the Falun Gong in favour of Islam. The government has not prevented Falun Gong members from carrying out their activities in public.

For Muslim children, religious education according to a government-approved curriculum is compulsory in public schools. There are no restrictions on homeschooling, although primary school is compulsory. However, private schools and colleges do have some legal requirements.

Several religious holidays are recognised as official holidays, including Hari Raya Puasa (Muslim), Hari Raya Haji (Muslim), the Milad un Nabi (Muslim), Wesak Day (Buddhist), Deepavali (Hindu), Thaipusam (Hindu), Christmas (Christian), and, in Sabah and Sarawak, Good Friday (Christian).

=== Judaism ===
Judaism is not a recognized religion in Malaysia, and movements within the religion which incorporate political Zionism and even non-Zionist Jewish movements such as classical Judaism that are rooted in nationhood are either hindered or outright criminalized. Jewish prayer items such as a Torah scroll delivered into the country may be confiscated by customs [if it was made known to them that its purpose was for the observance of Judaism]; thus (in reality) the practice of Judaism, be it Zionist or not, is hindered by the government.

In 1984, the New York Philharmonic Orchestra had to cancel its visit to Malaysia after the Malaysian Information Minister demanded that a composition by American-Jewish composer Ernest Bloch be eliminated from their program. Or Avi-Guy, a political analyst from the Australia/Israel & Jewish Affairs Council (AIJAC) in an opinion piece commented that "That incident had nothing to do with the Israeli–Palestinian conflict, only a disturbing rejection of all things Jewish."

In a sermon prepared by the Federal Territory Islamic Affairs Department (JAWI) in 2012, it was stated that Jews are to be regarded as the main enemy of Muslims in the context of the Israeli occupation of Palestine.

In 2017, a Christian Zionist event called Jerusalem's Jubilee was cancelled by the authorities. One of the reasons cited by the Royal Malaysia Police was that "celebrating Israel’s occupation of Palestine offended Malaysians." Besides that, the organizers of the event were regarded as being insensitive because they used Jewish symbols such as the menorah and the Hebrew word "Shalom" and thus were also perceived as promoting Jewish culture.

=== Inter-faith efforts in Malaysia ===
In April 2002, the Human Rights Commission (Suhakam) initiated an interfaith dialogue aimed at promoting better understanding and respect among the country's different religious groups. Participants included representatives from the Malaysian Islamic Development Department, the Malaysian Ulama Association, and the Malaysian Consultative Council of Buddhism, Christianity, Hinduism, Sikhism and Taoism (MCCBCHST).

In early 2005, much debate was stirred up by a proposed Inter-Faith Commission put forward by various individuals, some of which included academics and lawyers from the Bar Council.

The steering committee behind the proposal for a draft bill for the commission organised a national conference that saw about 200+ people from all religious backgrounds attending it. There they hashed out the framework for a commission that could advise the relevant parties on the many interfaith issues that arise in pluralistic Malaysia such as conversion from Islam to another faith, which is deemed as apostasy in Malaysia.

PAS, member of parliament Dzulkefly Ahmad, stated that he is against religious pluralism saying that it has "relativised" truth claims, by implying that Islam is the same as other religions. Dr. Ahmad went on to make a distinction between promoting relativism of religions and co-operation with people in a "multi-racial, multi-religious, multi-cultural, and multi-lingual" society, and that the latter was necessary to build a strong country.

After much coverage in the local newspapers, the draft bill was put on hold by Prime Minister Abdullah Ahmad Badawi, due to the controversy surrounding it.

== Conversion to Islam ==
=== Marriage and divorce ===
A non-Muslim person who wishes to marry a Muslim person must convert to Islam before the marriage can be recognised as legally valid. A marriage between two non-Muslims (civil law marriages), however, will not become void after one spouse subsequently converts to Islam.

In 2006, T. Saravanan, a Muslim convert, sought to dissolve his marriage with his non-Muslim wife via the Syariah Court. His wife, R. Subashini, applied to Kuala Lumpur High Court for an injunction against her husband seeking divorce in the Syariah Court. The High Court dismissed her application. This was affirmed in the Court of Appeal, where the court also ordered Subashini to take her case to the Syariah Court. As of September 2007, their case is pending in the Federal Court after an appeal by Subashini. Subashini is also seeking to stop or declare void the conversion of their children. As of 27 December 2007, R. Subashini failed in an attempt to stop her husband from divorcing her in an Islamic court. She also failed to persuade the federal court her husband should be banned from converting their four-year-old son to Islam. The appeal was rejected on a technicality but court added that she would be able to try again in a few months.

=== Voluntary conversion of minors ===
Conversion to other faiths is allowed in Malaysia once one has reached an age of majority. A minor may not convert to another faith without explicit permission of his or her guardian as described in the Guardianship of Infants Act 1961 and the Federal Constitution (Articles 11 (1) and 12 (3) and (4)).

This case was tested by Teoh Eng Huat v Kadhi of Pasir Mas, Kelantan & Anor in 1986. Teoh Eng Huat's daughter was a ward of the state. She married a Muslim. Hence then a minor, converted to Islam. The high court ruled that the father's right to decide the religion and upbringing of the infant is allowed "subject to the condition that it does not conflict with the principles of the infant's choice of religion guaranteed to her under the Federal Constitution". Through the proceedings, Susie Teoh never appeared in court to testify.

The decision was over-ruled on appeal to the Supreme Court, who held "in all the circumstances and in the wider interests of the nation no infant shall have the automatic right to receive instruction relating to any other religion other than (her) own without the permission of the parent or guardian".

The Supreme Court further held that this was "only of academic interest" as Susie Teoh was no longer a minor at the time of hearing.

In response several states (Islamic laws are passed by individual states) passed laws providing for conversion by 15 (defined as "baligh" in Islam or the age of puberty). Federal law still provides for the age of majority as 18.

=== Automatic conversion of minors following parental conversion ===
The state of Selangor passed a legal amendment in 1989 that if an adult converts to Islam, any infant children become converted at the same moment. This passed over the opposition of the Malaysian Chinese Association and the Democratic Action Party, and became law. However, after public outcry, it was quietly removed by its non-inclusion in future amendments of the state bill.

=== Unilateral conversion of minor by one parent ===
In the case of Chang Ah Mee v Jabatan Hal Ehwal Agama Islam, Majlis Ugama Islam Sabah in 2003 heard in the Sabah High Court, the father converted to Islam and converted the child to Islam without consent or knowledge of the mother, Chang Ah Mee, on 28 July 1998. The mother gained custody of the child on 13 November 1998 and subsequently sued to declare the conversion void.

The court determined that as a state court, it had jurisdiction over all state matters even those concerning Islam. Further, based upon the Federal Constitution (article 12), The Guardianship of Infants Ordinance (Sabah) 1999, The Law Reform (Marriage and Divorce) Act, 1976 and The Administration of Islamic Law Enactment 1992 (Sabah) determined the conversion of a two-year-old child to be void.

In 2003, this issue became prominent again in the case of Shamala Sathiyaseelan v Dr. Jeyaganesh C. Mogarajah. In the first hearing before the High Court, Shamala Sathiyaseelan sought (1) to bring committal proceedings against the father of the infants for breach of the interim custody order of the High Court of 17 April 2003, and (2) to declare that she was not bound by any decisions, order or proceedings of the syariah court.

Earlier the High Court had granted custody to Shamala Sathiyaseelan with access for the father. He failed to return the children to her on 25 May 2003. Shamala and Jeyaganesh were married under Hindu rites registered under the jurisdiction of the Law Reform Act. The husband converted to Islam on 19 November 2002. On 25 November 2002 he converted the children without the mother's knowledge or consent. They were still not divorced at the time.

Without knowledge of Shamala he then obtained a custody order in the syariah court on 30 January 2003. The High Court ruled that the custody order issued by the syariah court "did not change the interim civil court order". They ruled that the syariah court order "is not binding on the plaintiff wife who is non-Muslim". The interim custody order of the High Court and proceedings were binding on the now Muslim husband as matters arising out of the Hindu marriage registered under the Law Reform Act. As his Hindu wife did not file for divorce, she remains "his unconverted wife" under this law.

On 13 April 2004 Shamala once again went to the high court. This time to seek an order that the conversion of the infants was void. As in Chang Ah Mee, she cited the Federal Constitution (Article 12), the Guardianship of Infants Act 1961 and the Administration of Islamic Law (Federal Territories) Act, 1993.

The Guardianship of Infants Act for the Federal Territories differed from that of Sabah in one aspect as it used the term "parent or guardian" and not "both parents or a guardian" as in AMLE Sabah.

In this case the High Court ruled that only the consent of one parent is required in the conversion to Islam of a person below 18 in the Federal Territories.

Article 12(4) of the Federal Constitution reads "For the purposes of cl. (3) the religion of a person under the age of eighteen years shall be decided by his parent or guardian."

The High Court interpreted the term parent to mean father. The equality of rights granted to both parents under the Guardianship of Infants Act, 1961 was held inapplicable on the Muslim father.

In its judgement the High Court held the fatwa or the Mufti of the Federal Territory as persuasive (legal term). The Mufti stated that the father had the right to unilaterally convert the infants to Islam.

Shamala once again went to the high court on 20 July 2004 to apply inter alia for custody, care and control of the infants. The court awarded it with access for the father. In its judgement, it stated that "the right of religious practice of the two infant children shall be exercised equally by both parents" based on the Guardianship of Infants Act 1961. This was in spite of the earlier ruling that this act does not apply to Jeyaganesh who was now a Muslim.

The court also held that the applicable law at the time of conversion was civil law. It even ruled that the infants were "still Hindus at the time of conversion" and that the father should have consulted the mother before converting the infants.

However the court explicitly cautioned the mother from "influencing the infants' religious belief by teaching them her articles of faith or by making them eat pork" or she would risk losing her children. The rationale given was that the court "cannot run away from the fact that the two infant children are now muallaf" (converts to Islam).

As the case has gained prominence various religious organisations, human rights organisations and women's issues organisations have registered watching briefs. En. Haris Bin Mohamed Ibrahim has registered a watching brief on behalf of the Women's Aid Organisation, (WAO), All Women's Action Society (AWAM), Women's Center for Change, Penang (WCC) and Sisters in Islam (SIS). A. Kanesalingam, held watching brief for the Malaysian Consultative Council of Buddhism, Christianity, Hinduism and Sikhism (MCCBCHS). Amnesty International, Human Rights Watch and the Bar Council are also holding watching briefs for this case. The various organisations holding watching brief in this case now call themselves loosely Article 11 after the article of the Federal Constitution guaranteeing freedom of religion.

In 2014, the Seremban High Court over-ruled a Shariah Court, granting custody of Muslim children to their Hindu mother over that of their father who converted to Islam. However the father Izwan Viran Abdullah abducted the son from the mother after the ruling, and in which the police refused to help the mother retrieve the son citing the original Shariah custody ruling. The police inaction was criticised by Women's Aid Organisation and both governing and opposition politicians.

=== Unilateral conversion of children ruled illegal ===
In 2018, the Federal Court in the landmark case of Indira Gandhi Mutho v. Pengarah Jabatan Agama Islam Perak & Ors unanimously ruled that unilateral conversion of children to Islam without the consent of both parents is illegal and unlawful, and such conversion of the children are invalid, null and void.

The Federal Court held that according to Federal Constitution's Eleventh Schedule, words in singular form in the constitution should be interpreted to include plural form, therefore the word "parent" in Article 12(2), which states that the religion of a child shall be decided by the child's 'parent or guardian', shall be interpreted to mean "parents". Simply put, the consent of both parents is required to convert a child to another religion. The Federal Court also ruled that only the English version of the Federal Constitution is authoritative, and that the words "ibu atau bapa" (mother or father) in the Bahasa Malaysia version is a case of "lost in translation".

The Federal Court also in the Indira Gandhi case addressed the issues of conflicting jurisdiction between the civil courts and Shariah courts. The Federal Court held that based on the basic structure doctrine, only the civil courts have the inherent judicial powers to carry out judicial review on the action of public authorities, including that of an Islamic authority. The Shariah courts however do not have such power to review administrative decisions of public authorities. It further held that such inherent judicial power of the civil courts to review the action of public authorities cannot be removed by any means, even by a constitutional amendment passed by the Parliament, such as the Article 121(1A) inserted into the Constitution in 1988.

Therefore, if the purported converts (the children of Indira Gandhi in this case) in question was not validly converted, or not following the due process and procedures established by laws, then such persons are not a Muslim ab initio (from the start), and hence the civil courts have jurisdiction to review the validity of the Islamic authority's administrative decision to convert a person, and not the Shariah courts.

In the end, the Federal Court declared that the children of Indira Gandhi are not a Muslim and the conversion by the father and the Perak Islamic authority is invalid, null, and void. After the landmark Indira Gandhi case, Malaysia civil courts have since then repeatedly affirming such ruling and quashing unilateral conversion of children to Islam.

== Conversion from Islam ==
Muslims who wish to convert from Islam face severe obstacles. For Muslims, particularly ethnic Malays, the right to leave the Islamic faith and adhere to another religion is a controversial question. The legal process of conversion is also unclear; in practice it is very difficult for Muslims to change their religion legally.

In 1999 the High Court ruled that secular courts have no jurisdiction to hear applications by Muslims to change religions. According to the ruling, the religious conversion of Muslims lies solely within the jurisdiction of Islamic courts.

The issue of Muslim apostasy is very sensitive. In 1998 after a controversial incident of attempted conversion, the Government stated that apostates (i.e., Muslims who wish to leave or have left Islam for another religion) would not face government punishment so long as they did not defame Islam after their conversion. However, whether the very act of conversion was an "insult to Islam" was not clarified at the time. The Government opposes what it considers deviant interpretations of Islam, maintaining that the "deviant" groups' extreme views endanger national security. In 2005 international media attention focused on the Sky Kingdom sect whose founder Ayah Pin claimed to be God, and whose members – mostly Malays – were accordingly charged with religious "deviancy" and "humiliating Islam."

In the past, the Government imposed restrictions on certain Islamic groups, primarily the small number of Shi'a. The Government continues to monitor the activities of the Shi'a minority.

In April 2000, the state of Perlis passed a sharia law subjecting Islamic "deviants" and apostates to 1 year of "rehabilitation" (under the Constitution, religion, including sharia law, is a state matter). Leaders of the opposition Islamic party, PAS, have stated the penalty for apostasy – after the apostates are given a period of time to repent and they do not repent – is death.

Many Muslims who have converted to Christianity, Hinduism, Buddhism, Sikhism, other religions or irreligion (such as atheism or agnosticism) lead "double lives", hiding their new faith from friends and family.

General interpretation about the freedom of religion as described in the constitution in Malaysia is that a person has a right to practice his or her religion freely. This freedom does not grant a person a right to change his or her religion "at a whim and fancy". For example, a Muslim who wants to convert to another religion must get an explicit permission from a syariah court. The syariah courts rarely grant such requests, except in cases where a person has actually lived his or her whole adult life as a person of different religion, and only wants to change the official documents to reflect this fact. The Islamic interpretation of the situation is that only the syariah courts can decide who is a Muslim and who is not. A person does not have such freedom, and so cannot have a say in the judgement given in a syariah court.

The Lina Joy case challenged this view of the situation by taking the problem of apostasy to the Federal Court in 2007. Lina Joy lost the case and was denied identification as a Christian on her identification card. This cleared the situation about the overlapping areas of jurisdiction between the Islamic and the secular courts in Malaysia.

Government figures claim that the sharia courts of Malaysia received 863 applications to leave Islam between 2000 and 2010; only 168 people were granted permission to do so.

=== Apostasy under state law ===
State laws on apostasy in Malaysia. Criminal offences include 'apostasy', 'attempted apostasy' and being an 'accomplice to the apostasy' of someone else (i.e. converting another person). Death penalty (suspended by federal law) Imprisonment or detention Apostasy not legally possible Apostasy legal after counselling

As Malaysia is a federation, certain matters, such as religion, are handled by state governments. There is subsequently some amount of divergence between different states in the treatment of converts from Islam. Apostasy is not a federal crime. Civil rights group G25 stated in January 2020 that, although apostasy is a 'major sin in Islam', Muslims have freedom of worship under the Federal Constitution, just like all other citizens of Malaysia, so the various state laws prohibiting apostasy should be struck down. The group emphasised that other Malaysians are also allowed to change their religion, and pointed to other Muslim-majority countries such as Morocco, where apostasy isn't a crime for Muslims either.

==== Legal ====
The states of Negeri Sembilan, Perlis and Selangor allow Muslims to leave Islam after a process of counselling, in which they are repeatedly asked to repent, and if they refuse, a sharia court may declare the person no longer a Muslim.

- Negeri Sembilan: Section 119 Administration of The Religion of Islam (Negeri Sembilan) Enactment 2003 under the chapter of “Renunciation of the Religion of Islam” allows a Muslim change his or her religion for a 'reasonable cause'. A convert must first apply to the Shariah Court for a declaration that he or she is no longer a Muslim; the convert will then be counselled for about a year by a Mufti. If, after this period, the convert still wants to convert, the judge may permit the application. In 2006, the Negeri Sembilan Court also permitted Wong Ah Kiu, a convert from Islam to Buddhism legally known as Nyonya binti Tahir, to be buried in the Buddhist fashion, although her conversion had not been legally recognised while she was still alive. The case marked the first time non-Muslims had testified in a Shariah court in Malaysia.
- Perlis: Section 10 of the Perlis Islamic Faith Protection Enactment 2000 enables a Muslim to apply for apostasy. The Aqidah Rehabilitation Centre is given a role to advise the applicant to repent during a counselling process, which is called 'Istitabah'. After the counselling, a sharia court judge will once again advise the applicant to repent, but if he refuses to do so, and 'the judge is satisfied that the person has no liability or obligation under the Islamic Family Law, [the judge will] declare that the person is no longer a Muslim and order his release.'
- Selangor: After applying to leave Islam, a Muslim needs to undergo counselling and advice by an appointed committee before a decision is made by the shariah court to declare the applicant as no longer Muslim.

==== Illegal ====
In the states Kelantan and Terengganu, apostasy by a Muslim is a crime punishable by death and forfeiture of property; however, federal law prohibits the death penalty from being carried out. In the states Malacca, Pahang, Perak, and Sabah, apostasy, attempted apostasy or being an accomplice to apostasy of someone else is a crime punishable by various measures ranging from a fine of up to RM5,000, imprisonment (up to 3 years), or detention in an Islamic rehabitation centre (up to 3 years). In Pahang, apostates can be lashed six times with canes as well:

- Kelantan: 'Apostasy' is a criminal offence punishable with death and forfeiture of property but it cannot be applied. 'Attempted apostasy' is another criminal offence, carrying the maximum penalty of 36 months detention in an Islamic Rehabilitation Centre.
- Malacca: 'Apostasy' is a criminal offence, carrying the maximum penalty of 6 months detention in an Islamic Rehabilitation Centre. 'Accomplice to apostasy' is another criminal offence, carrying the maximum penalty of 3 years jail, a RM 5,000 fine, or both.
- Pahang: 'Attempted apostasy' is a criminal offence, carrying the maximum penalty of 3 years jail, six lashes, a RM 5,000 fine, or a combination.
- Perak: 'Apostasy' is a criminal offence, carrying the maximum penalty of 2 years jail, a RM 3,000 fine, or both.
- Sabah: 'Attempted apostasy' is a criminal offence, carrying the maximum penalty of 36 months detention in an Islamic Rehabilitation Centre.
- Terengganu: 'Apostasy' is a criminal offence punishable with death and forfeiture of property but death penalty cannot be applied as this power has not been given to them by constitution. The accused has the option of repentance within 3 days to go free.

==== Unclear ====
- Kedah: The Administration of Muslim Law Enactment (1962) does not mention apostasy. Therefore, it is neither punishable nor officially possible to stop being a Muslim.
- Sarawak: There is currently no legal process by which to change one's status from Muslim to something else. During an ongoing legal case in that started in 2015, involving three applicants who wanted to return to Christianity after divorcing or the death of their spouses and one applicant who converted to Christianity after marrying a Christian, the state government promised in 2018 to institute a legal process through which Muslims could apostatise.

=== Lina Joy ===
Lina Joy, who was born Azalina Jailani, converted from Islam to Christianity, arguing that it came under her right to freedom of religion under Article 11 of the Constitution of Malaysia. She first approached the National Registration Department (NRD) in February 1997, seeking permission to change her name to Lina Joy, and also her religious status. The application was rejected in August 1997 on the grounds that the Syariah Court had not granted permission for her to renounce Islam. In 1998, the NRD allowed the name change, but refused to change the religious status on her identity card.

Joy appealed against this decision in the High Court, arguing that she should not be subject to sharia law, having converted to Christianity. In April 2001, Judge Datuk Faiza Tamby Chik ruled that she could not change her religious identity, because ethnic Malays are defined as Muslims under the Constitution. Joy then took her case to the Court of Appeal. On 19 September 2005, the court ruled in a 2–1 majority decision against Joy. Justice Abdul Aziz and Justice Arifin Zakaria agreed that the NRD was correct in rejecting Joy's application and said it was up to the Syariah Court to settle the issue (Justice Gopal Sri Ram stated that it was null and void). Joy further appealed to the Federal Court of Malaysia, the highest court and the court of last resort in Malaysia. The Federal Court heard the appeal in July 2006, and it was presided by the Chief Justice of Malaysia Ahmad Fairuz Abdul Halim, Chief Judge of Sabah and Sarawak Richard Malanjum, and Federal Court Judge Alauddin Sheriff.

On 30 May 2007, the Federal Court, in a 2–1 decision, dismissed Joy's appeal. The Court's panel ruled that only the Syariah Court had the power to allow Joy to remove her religious designation of Islam from her national identity card. Chief Justice Ahmad Fairuz Sheikh Abdul Halim and Federal Court judge Justice Alauddin Mohd Sharif delivered the majority decision dismissing her appeal. Chief Judge of Sabah and Sarawak Justice Richard Malanjum dissented.

=== Nyonya Tahir ===
Wong Ah Kiu, legally known as Nyonya binti Tahir, died on 19 January 2006. When her family went to the local police office to file a notice of death, the officer on duty was reportedly confused by the fact that the identity card of the deceased identified her as a Muslim Malay, while her family were Buddhist Chinese. He later informed his superior, who contacted the Negeri Sembilan Religious Affairs Department. The Religious Affairs Department had the Tampin Syariah Court issue an injunction to put her burial on hold when they found out she was Malay; the Negeri Sembilan Islamic Affairs Council and Negeri Sembilan Islamic Affairs Department then filed an ex parte application with the Syariah High Court in Seremban the next day regarding her burial. The head of the Negeri Sembilan Religious Affairs Department came to her family's house in person to present the order that she be buried in the Muslim fashion. However, the court, having heard testimony from her children that she lived and died as a Buddhist, ruled on the following Monday that Wong was a non-Muslim when she died, and permitted her family to proceed with Buddhist funeral rites. Wong was buried next to her husband in the Chinese cemetery in her birthplace of Simpang Ampat, Alor Gajah.

The case marked the first time that non-Muslims had testified in a Syariah court in Malaysia; though non-Muslims are not permitted to initiate cases in Syariah courts, there had never been any official bar to their offering testimony. Religious minorities were reportedly relieved by the decision, but one advocacy group stated that the decision showed that the courts were "inconsistent in their protection" of non-Muslims.

=== Revathi Massosai ===
Revathi Massosai is a Malaysian woman who was raised as a Hindu but her identity card designates her as a Muslim. She has declared her religion to be Hindu and has petitioned unsuccessfully to have the word "Islam" removed from her identity card. Massosai married a Hindu man, but her marriage is not recognised by the Malaysian government because of religious issues. Massosai was incarcerated for six months in an Islamic re-education camp because of her attempts to renounce Islam in favour of the Hindu religion. She was also denied the guardianship of her newborn baby and was not allowed to meet her Hindu husband.

=== Persecution ===
There have been a few high-profile incidences and accounts of persecution of people from Muslim backgrounds attempting to convert from the Islamic faith. Some notable cases include:

- Hilmy Mohd Noor

Hilmy Mohd Noor, in his book "Circumcised Heart", describes his experiences during his detention under the Internal Security Act of Malaysia in what he described as resulting from religious persecution by Malaysian authorities. In the book, he also mentioned incidences of lobbying by some Muslims in his place of employment—a multinational oil company—to get his job terminated.

- Nur'aishah Bokhari

Nur'aishah Bokhari made a writ of habeas corpus by statutory declaration claiming that she was detained involuntarily by her own family members for wanting to convert out of Islam before marrying her Roman Catholic boyfriend. She subsequently escaped and has since left the country.

- Abdullah or Jeffrey

Jeffrey, also known as Abdullah and Or Boon Hua, 36, made the application on the grounds that he had not practiced Islamic teachings since converting to the religion 14 years ago.

In 2016, a court in Sarawak state allowed a Muslim to convert back to Christianity since he had become a Muslim when he was underage.

== Christian proselytisation ==
=== Proselytising ===
Under Article 11(4) of the Malaysian Constitution, proselytising of Muslims by members of other religions may be restricted or prohibited by state law (or federal law in the Federal Territories), even though Muslims may proselytise.

Most Christian and a few other religious groups in Malaysia put a standard disclaimer on literature and advertisements stating "For non-Muslims only".

=== Religious Materials ===
In 2002 the government banned the Bible in Malay (Alkitab) and in Iban (Bup Kudus). The Kudus uses the term "Allah Taala" for God. The ban has since been rescinded. Abdullah Badawi, when in office as Home Minister, claimed it was the work of an overzealous bureaucrat and he had the ban repealed personally.

Some states have laws that prohibit the use of Malay-language religious terms such as usage of the term "Allah" for God by Christians, but the authorities do not enforce them actively.

Distribution of other materials such as books or tapes translated into Bahasa Melayu (local Malay) or Indonesian is also discouraged. However, Malay-language Christian materials are available. Prior to the banning of the Bup Kudus in 2002, the distribution of Malay-language Christian materials faced few restrictions in East Malaysia.

=== Visas and other restrictions ===
In recent years, visas for foreign clergy no longer are restricted, and most visas were approved during the period covered by this report. Beginning in March 2000, representative non-Muslims were invited to sit on the immigration committee that approves such visa requests.

== Persecution of non-Sunni Muslims ==
According to government figures there are about 40,000 Shiites living in Malaysia, however the unofficial figures put the numbers at more than 300,000. Shiites are subjected to persecutions and raids by various state religious authorities in Malaysia. This discrimination received religious legitimacy in 1996 when the Fatwa Committee for Religious Affairs issued a religious opinion (fatwa) that upheld the "orthodoxy" of Sunni Islam and branded Shi'a Islam as "deviant." In doing so, it prohibited Shi'a from spreading their beliefs and distributing any electronic or print resources that espoused Shi'i principles. Interestingly, this opinion overturned a 1984 decision from the same committee that deemed Shi'ism acceptable in Malaysia. It caused many Shias to practice their religion underground.

In April 2009, the Selangor Islamic Religious Council of Malaysia issued a letter which forbade members of the Ahmadiyya Muslim Community to offer Friday prayers at their central mosque with immediate effect. Moreover, its failure by the Ahmadis to comply with the terms of the order will result in imprisonment of up to one year and/or a fine up to 3000 Malaysian ringgit. A large notice has been place outside the mosque which states Qadiani Bukan Agama Islam which translates to Qadiani [Ahmadiyyat] is not an Islamic Religion.

== Discrimination against atheists ==
The state has come under criticism from human rights organisations for its discrimination against atheists. In August 2017, Minister in the Prime Minister's Department Shahidan Kassim declared that "atheism is against the Constitution and the basic human rights" in Malaysia since "there is no provision on atheism" in the Constitution. Shahidan wanted atheists and atheist groups like the Kuala Lumpur chapter of Atheist Republic to be identified and hunted down. He also stated that "we need to restore the faith back in them, especially for Muslims. Actually they don't really want to be an atheist, but they lack knowledge about religion and that is why they are easily swayed to the new age teaching". Asyraf Wajdi Dusuki, Deputy Minister in the Prime Minister's Department in charge of Islamic affairs, stated that the group Atheist Republic will be investigated.

== Places of worship ==
The government generally respects non-Muslims' right of worship; however, state governments carefully control the building of non-Muslim places of worship and the allocation of land for non-Muslim cemeteries. Approvals for such permits sometimes are granted very slowly.

The Catholic Society of Shah Alam had been lobbying the state government for a permit to build a church in that city for more than 10 years. It was not until 2004 that the permit was finally granted. The church opened its doors on 10 September 2005.

The new pre-planned capital of Malaysia, Putrajaya, features a grand mosque as a prominent feature of the planned community. On 16 November 2005, Archbishop Murphy Pakiam announced that the Malaysian government had generously allocated a parcel of land in Putrajaya to the Archdiocese of Kuala Lumpur for building a Catholic church-run community centre. The Putrajaya Catholic Church Building Committee was set up on 3 October 2005. According to the committee, "The architectural planning and design will conform to the Liturgical requirements complementing the ambience of Putrajaya's lush greenery and landscape. We envisage the Putrajaya church to be a hallmark of the Catholic community in Malaysia and showcase the rich heritage of the Malaysian Catholics."

== Azan ==
The first Islamic call to prayer or Azan (also spelt Adhan), known as "subuh" (or dawn), occurs between as early as 4.30 AM to as late as 6.15 AM (depending on which region, city and state) with the exact time drifting throughout the year. Most Malaysian businesses start work as early as 7 AM up till as late as 9 AM. Many mosques amplify the early prayer call by way of loud speakers, and while in some cases only a few neighbouring homes are affected, some large mosques (for example the State Mosque of Selangor which has speakers on its minarets) have prayer calls which can be heard in a large surrounding area.

In 2004 the Bar Council of Malaysia journal "Infoline" carried an article which questioned the need for the Azan as it was disturbing to non-Muslims and not needful. The article was condemned because Azan is a religious requirement.

In December 2004, Minister of Culture, Arts and Heritage Datuk Seri Utama Dr Rais Yatim mentioned in an interview that the Azan may be disturbing. He stated "...the Muslim call for Subuh (dawn) prayer may disturb the sleep of non-Muslims but they have accepted this as a fundamental part of Islam. But how loud the volume of the PA system in the mosque should be, is another matter."

Excessive noise however is common matter of uneasiness among some Malaysians because non-Muslims also often practise rituals that cause much discomfort to others (Muslims and non-Muslims alike). Among these are Chinese funeral processions that are often accompanied by drums and cymbals, and other rituals not exclusive to the Chinese.

A local daily, The Star reported that a proposal by Kepong MP Dr Tan Seng Giaw to regulate the Azan so that it will not be too loud or disturb non-Muslims caused a stir in the Dewan Rakyat. Muslim MPs accused him of being insensitive and Minister in the Prime Minister's Department Datuk Mohamed Nazri Abdul Aziz blasted the DAP member for allegedly trying to destroy the multi-religious tolerance in the country.

== Taxation ==
In Malaysia, there is a rebate in income tax for money paid to the government in form of "zakat", or the obligatory alms Muslims must give to the poor. However, money paid to other causes in the name of other religions under similar circumstances is given only income tax relief, and such relief is given only if the particular beneficiary has obtained approved status from the Malaysian Government, which is difficult in practice. Money donated to such approved beneficiary is only deducted from the income on which the amount of tax is based, while zakat is deducted from the amount of tax itself. For example, suppose a person earning RM 50,000 owes a tax of RM 3,000 and donates RM 1,000 to zakat, the whole of the RM 1,000 is directly deducted from the RM 3,000, whereas donations to other approved beneficiary would permit only a deduction of the RM 1,000 against the RM 50,000. The former being a tax credit and the latter being a tax deduction.

Zakat (or tithe) monies, however, are paid by Muslims directly to official organisations run by state governments. Receipts are issued out and must be submitted to apply for tax relief. The zakat organisations themselves are governed by specific Islamic rulings defining the categories of people who qualify to receive the alms as well as the amount to be paid out by Muslims based on their income.

In contrast, charities in Malaysia are run privately by voluntary organisations, collecting voluntary donations from the general public, not compulsory tithes – thus the difference in treatment by the government.

Additionally, income tax relief granted to companies for donation made to tax exempt charities is restricted to 5% of the aggregate income of the company. Not all non-Muslim charities are granted tax exempt status, it is only given to registered and approved charities, partly to prevent abuse. There are stringent requirements to gain this advantage. Having earned this advantage these charities are further disadvantage in that their prospective donors are discouraged from donating monies to these charities because the donors are given tax relief for up to 5% of their aggregate income only.

== Inheritance under Sharia law ==
Upon the death of a Muslim, his or her estate shall be distributed according to sharia law. This is called the Faraid or the Islamic law of Inheritance. A Muslim is allowed to make a will, called a wasiat, but only one-third of his estate shall be disposed of according to the will. Furthermore, the requirement under sharia law is that disposition according to wills shall not benefit any person opposed to Islam as a religion. This situation applies throughout Peninsula Malaysia and Sabah. In Sarawak, a Muslim testator may dispose one-third of his property to anyone he or she wishes.

== Freedom of expression ==
=== Films ===
Movies which depict people considered prophets in Islam are generally censored or banned as the depiction of prophets is considered "haraam" (not allowed) under Islam. One notable case was the banning of The Prince of Egypt when its producers would not accept censorship of the character Moses (Musa in Islam).

However, in a more recent case, The Passion of the Christ was allowed, after the intervention of the Prime Minister Abdullah Ahmad Badawi, under strict conditions restricting its viewership to Christians with sales of tickets being carried out by various churches and para-church organisations.

In 2004, Yasmin Ahmad's (herself a Malaysian Muslim) film Sepet was rejected by censors who asked that scenes be removed. 10 scenes were objectionable. Among objectionable material queried in the movie was why the movie did not depict any attempt to convert Jason (the Chinese non-Muslim main character) to Islam after he had fallen in love with a Malay girl.

In 2014 the biblical film Noah was banned by the Malaysian authorities reasoning that the film was un-Islamic.

=== Print media ===
On 10 December 2007, Malaysian authorities banned the Malay-language section of a Catholic weekly newspaper, The Catholic Herald due to its use of the word Allah, the name for God which Christians had used for hundreds of years in the country. Their reasoning is that the word Allah by Christians would confuse Malay Muslims. The Herald meanwhile, filed suit at the beginning of December following warnings that its permit could be revoked if it did not cease use of the word "Allah" in the Malay language section of its newspaper. Countering the Herald's suit, the Malaysian security authorities on 30 December, warned its printing permit would not be renewed if it continued using the word "Allah," which the government continued to say can only be used by Muslims.

The Catholic Church challenged the government gag order prohibiting it from using the word "Allah" in its Herald (The Catholic Weekly) through judicial review. Lau Bee Lan J allowed the application by the Titular Roman Catholic Archbishop of Kuala Lumpur, Datuk Murphy Pakiam, for leave to sue the government regarding the use of the word "Allah" to proceed. Three points that were raised in the lawsuit. The first is for the court to declare that the government's action in prohibiting The Herald from using the word "Allah" is illegal and null and void. The second is for a court declaration that the Archbishop as publisher of The Herald is entitled to use the word "Allah" and lastly, that the court should declare that the word "Allah" is not exclusive to the religion of Islam. The decision of the High Court - that found the use of "Allah" as constitutional - was overturned by the Court of Appeal. The ruling was distinguished in the High Court case of Jill Ireland v Menteri Dalam Negeri (2021), where the 1986 Directive was overturned as "illegal", "irrational" and "unconstitutional".

=== Bibles and religious literature ===
- The Sabah Evangelical Church of Borneo also took legal action after the authorities banned the import of Christian books containing the word Allah.
- In January 2008, children's Christian books with illustrations of prophets were confiscated from several bookstores around the country.
- In May 2008, Malaysian customs confiscated 3 Christian CDs with the words Allah written on them from a Christian Sarawakian lady, Jill Ireland bint Lawrence Bill. She challenged the confiscation of the CDs in court.
- In March 2010, the Malaysian Home Ministry seized 30,000 Malay bibles from a port in Kuching, Sarawak.
- In January 2014, the Selangor Islamic Religious department (Jais) raided the Bible Society of Malaysia and confiscated 320 Malay and Iban bibles, which catered for Sabah and Sarawak Christians.
- In October 2014, Malaysian Customs seized Christian books and CDs from a pastor at the low cost terminal at Kuala Lumpur International Airport who was on the way back to Sabah from Medan.

=== Individual words ===
Under subsection 48(3) and (4) of the Penang Islamic Religious Administration Enactment 2004, the Mufti of Penang state is allowed to pass legally binding religious rulings, or fatwa. In 2010, this power was used to pass a fatwa which would penalize non-Muslims for using the following words, or to write or publish them, in any form, version or translation in any language or for use in any publicity material in any medium: "Allah", "Firman Allah", "Ulama", "Hadith", "Ibadah", "Kaabah", "Qadhi'", "Illahi", "Wahyu", "Mubaligh", "Syariah", "Qiblat", "Haji", "Mufti", "Rasul", "Iman", "Dakwah", "Wali", "Fatwa", "Imam", "Nabi", "Sheikh", "Khutbah", "Tabligh", "Akhirat", "Azan", "Al Quran", "As Sunnah", "Auliya'", "Karamah", "Syahadah", "Baitullah", "Musolla", "Zakat Fitrah", "Hajjah", "Taqwa" and "Soleh". This ruling caused uproar, particularly in the Sikh community, as Sikh religious texts use the term "Allah", with members of the community calling the law unconstitutional. The ban was overturned in 2014, as Penang lawmakers decreed that the Penang Islamic Religious Administration Enactment law only gave the Mufti permission to pass fatwas for the Muslim community, and that these bans were not enforceable on non-Muslim individuals.

== Protests against religious freedom ==
On 5 November 2006, a group of Muslims gathered outside the Church of Our Lady of Lourdes, Silibin, in the town of Ipoh, Perak to protest an alleged conversion of Muslim Malays out of Islam. The allegation was spread via a text message that claimed the church would baptise a group of Muslim Malays. The message proved to be false as the church celebrated only a Holy Communion service for 110 Indian children. The message further alleged that a famous Malaysian sportsman Azhar Mansor was leaving Islam to embrace Christianity. The police had traced the message to a lady who had met Harussani Zakaria, mufti of the state of Perak in a meeting. He has stated that the message was to remain within the confines of the meeting but had made no attempt to verify the authenticity of the message nor report it to the police as converting Muslims is illegal under Malaysian law. On 17 November, Azhar Mansor declared that he had not renounced Islam, and Umno president Datuk Seri Abdullah Ahmad Badawi said that there should now be an end to the speculation.

== Destruction of religious property ==
=== Destruction of Hindu temples ===
Approximately nine percent of the population of Malaysia are Indians, of whom nearly 90 percent are practising Hindus. Indian settlers came to Malaysia from India in the late 19th and early 20th centuries.

After a violent conflict in Penang between Hindus and Muslims in March 1998, the government announced a nationwide review of unlicensed Hindu temples and shrines. However, implementation was not vigorous and the program was not a subject of public debate. In April 2006, local authorities demolished several Hindu temples to make way for developmental projects. Their excuse was that these temples were unlicensed and squatting on government land.

Between April and May 2006, several Hindu temples were demolished by city hall authorities in the country, accompanied by violence against Hindus. On 21 April 2006, the Malaimel Sri Selva Kaliamman Temple in Kuala Lumpur was reduced to rubble after the city hall sent in bulldozers.

The president of the Consumers Association of Subang and Shah Alam in Selangor had been helping to organise efforts to stop the local authorities in the Muslim dominated city of Shah Alam from demolishing a 107-year-old Hindu temple. The growing Islamization in Malaysia is a cause for concern to many Malaysians who follow minority religions such as Hinduism.

On 11 May 2006, armed city hall officers from Kuala Lumpur forcefully demolished part of a 60-year-old suburban temple that serves more than 1,000 Hindus. The "Hindu Rights Action Force", a coalition of several NGO's, have protested these demolitions by lodging complaints with the Malaysian Prime Minister. Many Hindu advocacy groups have protested what they allege is a systematic plan of temple cleansing in Malaysia. The official reason given by the Malaysian government has been that the temples were built "illegally". However, several of the temples are centuries old.

According to a lawyer for the Hindu Rights Action Task Force, a Hindu temple is demolished in Malaysia once every three weeks.

In 2009, in response to the proposed construction of a temple in Selangor, around 50 Muslim protestors chopped off the head of a cow to protest, with leaders saying "there would be blood" if a temple was constructed in Shah Alam. 12 of them were later arrested and charged for sedition and illegal assembly, which they pleaded guilty to in 2010. Each of them were fined RM1000 for illegal assembly, while two protestors were fined RM3000 for sedition, with one of the two was also sentenced to one week in prison.

=== Destruction of Chinese shrine ===
In February 2020, more than a dozen Selayang Municipal Council (MPS) enforcement officers tore down a Chinese shrine dedicated to "Datuk Gong" near Yu Xu Gong temple in Taman Bidara, Selayang. The shrine, which had stood at the end of the alley for close to 30 years, was torn down by MPS enforcement officers because according to the council, it was built illegally on government land.

=== Church attacks ===
The Metro Tabernacle, an Assemblies of God church in Desa Melawati, Kuala Lumpur was set on fire on 8 January 2010. While in Malacca, black paint was splashed on the outer wall of the Malacca Baptist Church in Durian Daun.

=== Mosque/prayer halls (Surau) attacks ===
There were also incidences of attacks being made onto Muslim places of worship. In January 2010, two separate prayer halls (surau) in Muar became targets of arson attacks. And as recent as August 2010, another prayer hall in Seremban was subjected to vandalism. The prayer hall was defaced by red paint and littered with alcohol bottles.

== See also ==
- Malaysian Consultative Council of Buddhism, Christianity, Hinduism, Sikhism and Taoism
- Kartika Sari Dewi Shukarno
- Human rights in Malaysia
- Religion in Malaysia
- Politics of Malaysia
