= M. Magendran =

Mountain climber

Datuk M. Magendran
- எம். மகேந்திரன்
- M. Magendran on the summit of Mount Everest – 23 May 1997
- Born: Magendran M. Munisamy; 6 December 1963 (age 62); Kuala Lumpur
- Education: M. Ed, University of Malaya, Kuala Lumpur, Malaysia. B. Sp. Sc (Hons), University of Malaya, Kuala Lumpur, Malaysia.
- Occupation: Teacher / Principal / Sports Manager
- Known for: First Malaysian/Tamil to conquer Mount Everest; The Malaysian title of Datuk; Photo on postage stamp
- Spouse: Datin V. Senthamarai
- Children: 3

Datuk M. Magendran PJN DSPN JSM KMN AMS (Tamil: எம். மகேந்திரன்) born Magendran M. Munisamy on 6 December 1963 in Kuala Lumpur, Malaysia) is the first Malaysian mountain climber to conquer the summit of Mount Everest. Magendran's party ascended the South Col on the southeast ridge. He stepped onto Everest's summit on 23 May 1997, at 11:55 a.m. local time. He was followed by N. Mohanadas (Mohanadas Nagappan), who reached the summit a few minutes later at 12:10 p.m. The two mountaineers were part of the first "Malaysia-Everest Project 97" jointly organised by the Malaysia Mountaineering Association and the Ministry of Youth and Sports of Malaysia. Also, with their team of ten people was M. Moorthy (Moorthy Maniam), a Malaysian of Indian descent.

Mount Everest is the world's highest mountain, with a peak at 8,848 metres (29,029 ft) above sea level. Its summit was first achieved in 1953 after numerous failed attempts that began in 1921. The first person to finally set foot on its summit was New Zealander Sir Edmund Hillary, who was accompanied by Tenzing Norgay of India. Both M. Magendran and N. Mohanadas were conferred Datukships by the Penang state government in 2010 for their Himalayan achievement. Both men were also conferred the Federal 'Datukships' title by the King of Malaysia in Jun 2011.

In June 2013, Datuk Magendran, who is considered a pioneer among Malaysians, gave advice for those mountain climbers who would brave the hazards of the world's highest peak:

ALL safety and preparatory efforts must be taken before setting out on a mountain climb, especially when it involves the world's tallest mountain. One should be very well prepared and must have undergone rigorous physical and mental training before taking on the mammoth peak, [...] One must undergo sufficient training and preparation, which includes endurance training and altitude training. I had been involved in outdoor activities such as mountain climbing and jungle-trekking for ten years and received almost three years of rigorous training before our team left for Mount Everest in 1997.

Magendran urged future climbers and trekkers not to overlook their health before and during the climb, adding that any symptom that was overlooked could be fatal. He also reminded, "Trekkers should keep an eye on the health of their teammates, too."

The year 1997 also commemorated the 40th anniversary of Malaysian independence. In 2000, both M. Magendran and N. Mohanadas were pictured on their nation's postage stamps.

Magendran has been a vice-principal at SMK USJ 8 in Subang Jaya since September 2016. Being a Sports Science and Physical Education graduate, he also teaches Physical Education.

After serving as a vice principal at SMK USJ 8, Magendran was promoted to principal at SMK Taman Sri Muda, Shah Alam. The last three years of Magendran's tenure as head of school were especially challenging. Teaching and learning were severely affected by the COVID-19 pandemic, followed by a devastating flood in December 2021 that destroyed the entire ground floor of the school. However, under Magendran's strong leadership—and with the support of the government, parents, and the wider community—students continued their studies from home through online classes. The school was eventually restored and resumed operations in full, returning to normalcy like any other unaffected school. Magendran retired as principal on 5 December 2023, receiving a rousing farewell from teachers, students, parents, education officers, friends, and well-wishers. While many know Magendran as the mountaineer who made history for Malaysia on 23 May 1997, when he became the first Malaysian to summit Mount Everest, few are aware of the dedicated teacher he has been for the past 34 years.

He began his civil service in 1989 and went on to serve as a teacher, an education officer, a sports manager with the National Sports Council of Malaysia, and a school senior assistant, before assuming his final post as principal of SMK Taman Sri Muda secondary school.

== `Malaysia Boleh!’ (Malaysia Can Do It!) ==
The idea of `Malaysia Boleh!’ was first mooted in 1993 by Nestle and made its debut as part of a marketing campaign for Milo (drink), and a confidence boost for the Malaysian contingent during the 1993 Southeast Asia Games in Singapore. The`Malaysia Boleh!’ slogan slowly gained influence as a signature battle cry in the mid-1990s when Prime Minister Mahathir Mohamad co-opted the catch phrase to spur the nation's Vision 2020. Likewise, the Malaysia-Everest `97 organizing committee also incorporated the phrase to its official expedition logo to instill a sense of confidence and perseverance among the climbers. And the force of the slogan worked both ways, it gave the climbers the competitive spirit to strive for excellence and the success of the expedition gave the much needed oomph to the `Malaysia Boleh! spirit. The slogan became more popular and inspired many Malaysians to embark on other adventures like the Read brothers who walked to the last degree of the North pole (1998), Dato' Azhar Mansor who sailed solo around the world (1999), Dato' Abdul Malik Mydin who swam across the English Channel (2003) and many more. The stories of these exemplary Malaysians never cease to amaze the Prime Minister whenever he speaks about discipline, patience and over-coming challenges. Tun Dr. Mahathir Mohamad in his book, A Doctor in the House: The Memoirs of Tun Dr. Mahathir Mohamad (pg. 589) stated that:

The new `Malaysia Boleh!’ (Malaysia can do it) seemed to take hold and coincide with the period of growth. The Malaysia Book of Records had also been started and people now try to pull off unusual feat to get into it. The new competitive spirit, combined with the desire to show that Malaysians could do anything, generated much excitement in the country. Datuk Azhar Mansor sailed solo around the world; Datuk M. Magendran and Datuk N. Mohanadas climbed Mount Everest; Datuk Abdul Malik Mydin swam across the English Channel [...] People cheered these plucky Malaysians and saw their achievements as, if not world-beating, at least world-class.

== From Classroom To Community ==
=== Preserving Mountain Ecosystems ===
Datuk M. Magendran has been actively involved in environmental conservation efforts with Sabah Parks since 1999, long before his retirement. One of his notable contributions was through the “Dandelion dan Gunung Kinabalu – Warisan Dunia” project, launched in 2011 to combat the spread of invasive dandelions on Mount Kinabalu, a UNESCO World Heritage site. These non-native plants, likely introduced by climbers, were rapidly spreading in high-altitude zones and threatening the mountain’s fragile native ecosystem. Magendran joined over 70 volunteers—including teachers, librarians, and park rangers—in manually removing the invasive species in sensitive areas such as Mesilau and Laban Rata. Nearly a ton of dandelions was cleared in one phase alone. The project also served to raise environmental awareness and involve youth in biodiversity conservation, aligning with Magendran’s passion for both education and ecological stewardship.

In line with his commitment to nature conservation, Datuk M. Magendran has also advocated for the protection of Malaysia’s forests amid the rising popularity of trekking and mountaineering. Speaking at the Gathering of Trekkers & Climbers event, he reflected on how outdoor activities—once considered niche—have become mainstream following the success of the 1997 Malaysia Everest expedition. He highlighted the nationwide growth of climbing associations and emphasized that preserving natural environments is essential for future generations to continue enjoying outdoor pursuits.

=== Mountains for Body and Mind ===
Datuk M. Magendran continues to promote mountaineering as a sport and as a means of supporting physical and mental health. He has advocated the idea of “climb for a healthier lifestyle,” encouraging participation in hiking and trekking to build endurance, discipline, and overall well-being. He has also highlighted the role of mountain environments in providing opportunities for individuals to engage with nature and outdoor activities.

However, Magendran also underscores the critical need for safety and responsibility in outdoor pursuits. Reacting to the rise in hiking-related emergencies, he has advocated for structured reforms, including mandatory fitness screenings, certified mountain guides, and properly registered climbing routes. His call is not to deter enthusiasts but to ensure that every climb is approached with preparedness and respect for the risks involved.

At age 61, Magendran summited Mount Kinabalu.

== Awards and recognition ==
- On 29 May 2003, M. Magendran and N. Mohanadas (the only two Mount Everest summiteers from Malaysia) received the Mount Everest Golden Jubilee Medals from the Honourable Prime Minister of Nepal, Lokendra Bahadur Chand. Both were invited by the Nepal Mountaineering Association (NMA) to be a part of the week-long celebration organized by the Nepal Government in conjunction with the 50th Anniversary of the conquest of Mount Everest in 1953.
- On 10 July 2010, M. Magendran was among 47 people who were conferred the Darjah Setia Pangkuan Negeri award (DSPN), which carries the title Datuk in conjunction with the 72nd birthday of the Penang State Governor Tun Abdul Rahman Abbas. Magendran was honoured along with teammate N. Mohanadas. Second Deputy Chief Minister of Penang Prof. Dr. Ramasamy Palanisamy said the state government gave the awards to the duo to recognize their feat.
- On 4 June 2011, M. Magendran was honoured with the Distinguished Order of Meritorious Service (Darjah Panglima Jasa Negara) or PJN in conjunction with the birthday of His Majesty Tuanku Mizan Zainal Abidin, the 13th King of Malaysia. Magendran was among 67 people who were conferred the PJN award, which carries the title Datuk.
- On 5 November 2015, M. Magendran received the BrandLaureate Brand ICON Leadership Award from The World Brands Foundation. He was recognized for demonstrating outstanding leadership and making significant contributions to society. Magendran's award was specifically for his leadership and contributions in the areas of mountain conservation and mountaineering.
- On 23 May 2017, Both M. Magendran and N. Mohanadas together with other team members of Malaysia-Everest 97 expedition were honoured in an event “Two decades of first Malaysians on Everest” organised by The Malaysian Indian Sports and Cultural Foundation (MISCF) and Ministry of Youth and Sports (Malaysia) to commemorate the 20th anniversary of their historic feat.
- On 11 July 2025, Datuk M. Magendran was among 91 recipients honoured at The Malaysia Book of Records 30th Anniversary. The recipients honoured at the MBR's 30th Anniversary record-breaking gala showcased the breadth of Malaysian talent and ambition, with records spanning human achievements, sports, education, business, art, entertainment, community engagement, and technology.

== Honours ==
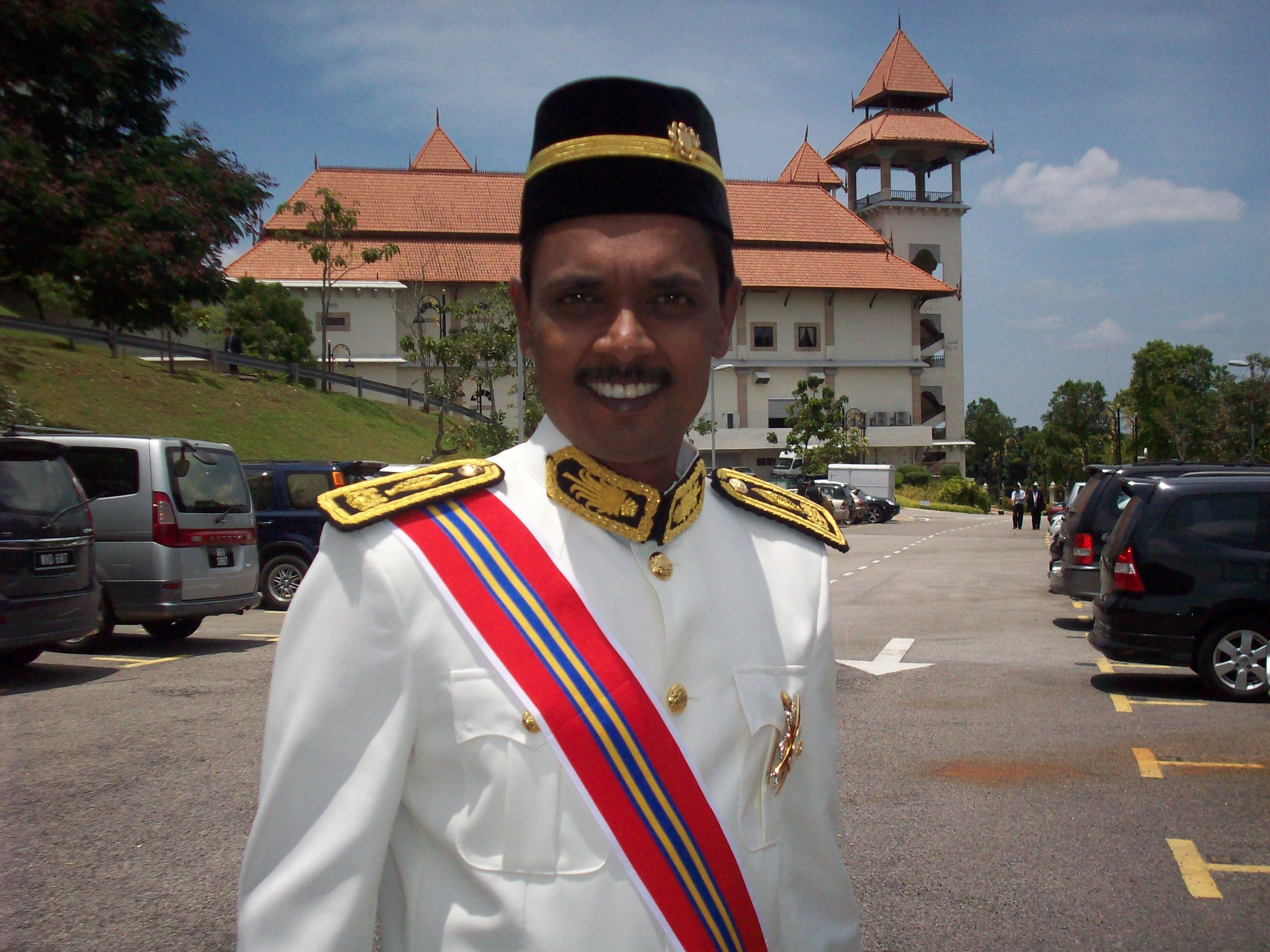
M. Magendran at the Istana Melawati, Putrajaya, after receiving the Panglima Jasa Negara (PJN) award (2011)

=== Honours of Malaysia ===
- Malaysia
  - Commander of the Order of Meritorious Service (PJN) – Datuk(2011)
  - Companion of the Order of Loyalty to the Crown of Malaysia (JSM) (2004)
  - Officer of the Order of the Defender of the Realm (KMN) (1997)
  - Penang
    - Officer of the Order of the Defender of State (DSPN) – Datuk (2010)
  - Selangor
    - Member of the Order of the Crown of Selangor (AMS) (1999)

=== Overseas Honours ===
- Nepal
  - Mount Everest Golden Jubilee Celebration - Medal (2003)

== See also ==
- List of climbers and mountaineers
- List of notable Malaysians
- List of notable Tamil people
- Timeline of climbing Mount Everest – 1997
