= List of Christian denominations claiming apostolic succession =

This is a list of Christian churches who claim apostolic succession and thus are part of the historical episcopate. Some of the Christian denominations listed here might only be seen as episcopus vagans or not recognised entirely by the mainstream denominations like the Catholic Church, Eastern Orthodox Church, Evangelical-Lutheran churches, and others. The list does not include groups with alternative doctrines such as restorationism or continuity of apostolic faith.

== Catholicism ==
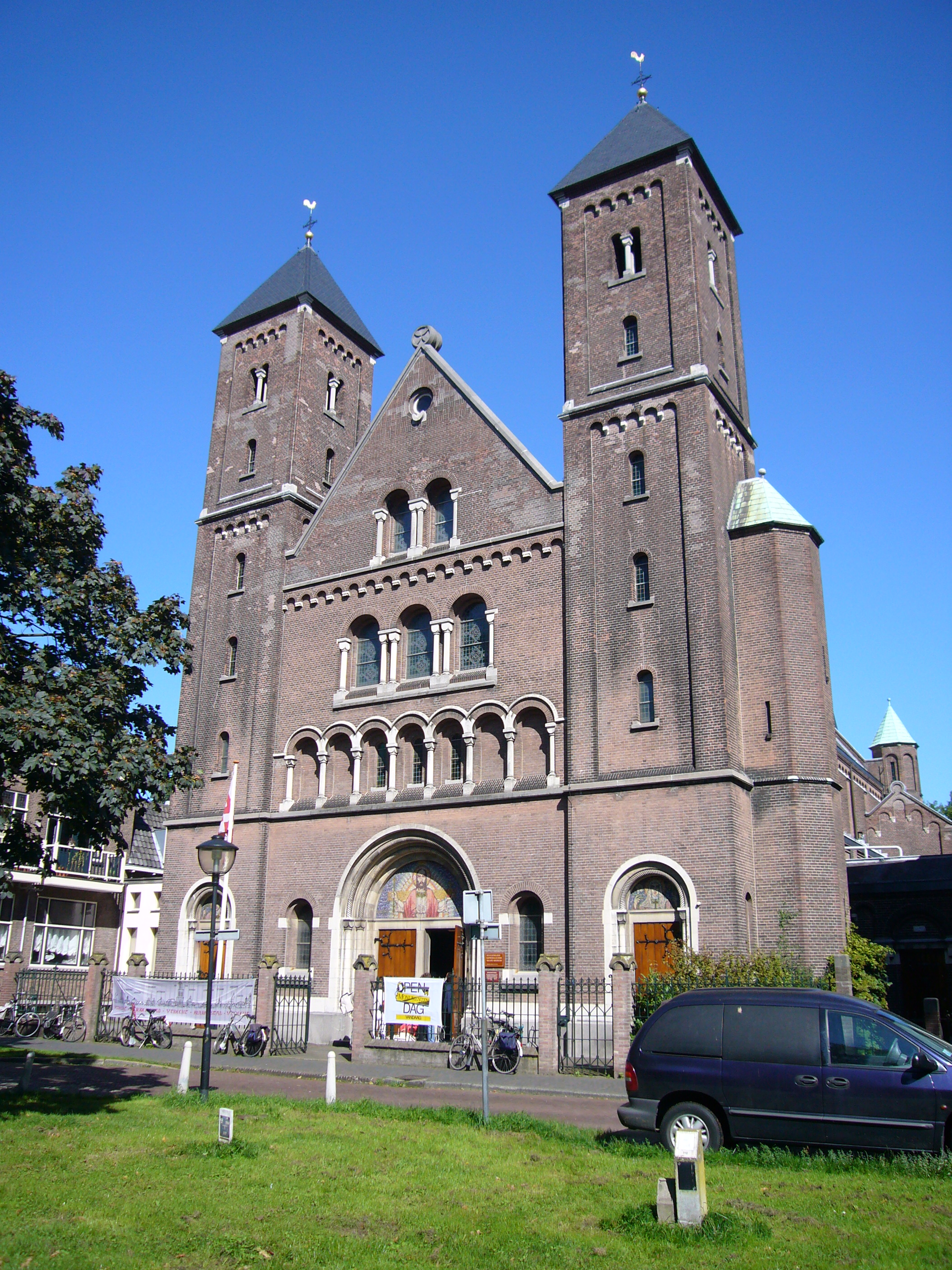
St. Gertrude's Cathedral is the mother church of the Old Catholic Church in Utrecht, Netherlands.

- Catholic Church:
  - Albanian Greek Catholic Church
  - Armenian Catholic Church
  - Belarusian Greek Catholic Church
  - Bulgarian Greek Catholic Church
  - Chaldean Catholic Church
  - Coptic Catholic Church
  - Eritrean Catholic Church
  - Ethiopian Catholic Church
  - Maronite Church
  - Syriac Catholic Church
  - Syro-Malankara Catholic Church
  - Greek Byzantine Catholic Church
  - Greek Catholic Church of Croatia and Serbia
  - Hungarian Greek Catholic Church
  - Italo-Albanian Catholic Church
  - Latin Church
  - Macedonian Greek Catholic Church
  - Melkite Greek Catholic Church
  - Romanian Greek Catholic Church
  - Russian Greek Catholic Church
  - Ruthenian Greek Catholic Church
  - Slovak Greek Catholic Church
  - Syro-Malabar Church
  - Ukrainian Greek Catholic Church
- Union of Utrecht (Old Catholic):
  - Catholic Diocese of the Old Catholics in Germany
  - Christian Catholic Church of Switzerland
  - Polish-Catholic Church in the Republic of Poland
  - Old Catholic Church of Austria
  - Old Catholic Church of the Czech Republic
  - Old Catholic Church of the Netherlands
- Union of Scranton
  - Nordic Catholic Church
  - Polish National Catholic Church
- Sedevacantist movement:
  - Congregation of Mary Immaculate Queen, through Ngô Đình Thục
  - Palmarian Catholic Church, through Ngô Đình Thục
  - Society of Saint Pius V, through Ngô Đình Thục
  - Unión Católico Trento, through Ngô Đình Thục
- Other Independent Catholic denominations:
  - American National Catholic Church
  - Brazilian Catholic Apostolic Church
  - Catholic Mariavite Church, through Old Catholic lines
  - Ecumenical Catholic Church
  - Ecumenical Catholic Church of Christ
  - Ecumenical Catholic Communion
  - Free Catholic Church in Germany, through the ICAB
  - Liberal Catholic Church, through Old Catholic lines
  - Liberal Catholic Church, Province of the United States of America
  - Mariavite Church, through Old Catholic lines
  - Mexican Catholic Apostolic Church, through Carmel Henry Carfora
  - Philippine Independent Church, through the TEC

== Eastern Orthodoxy ==
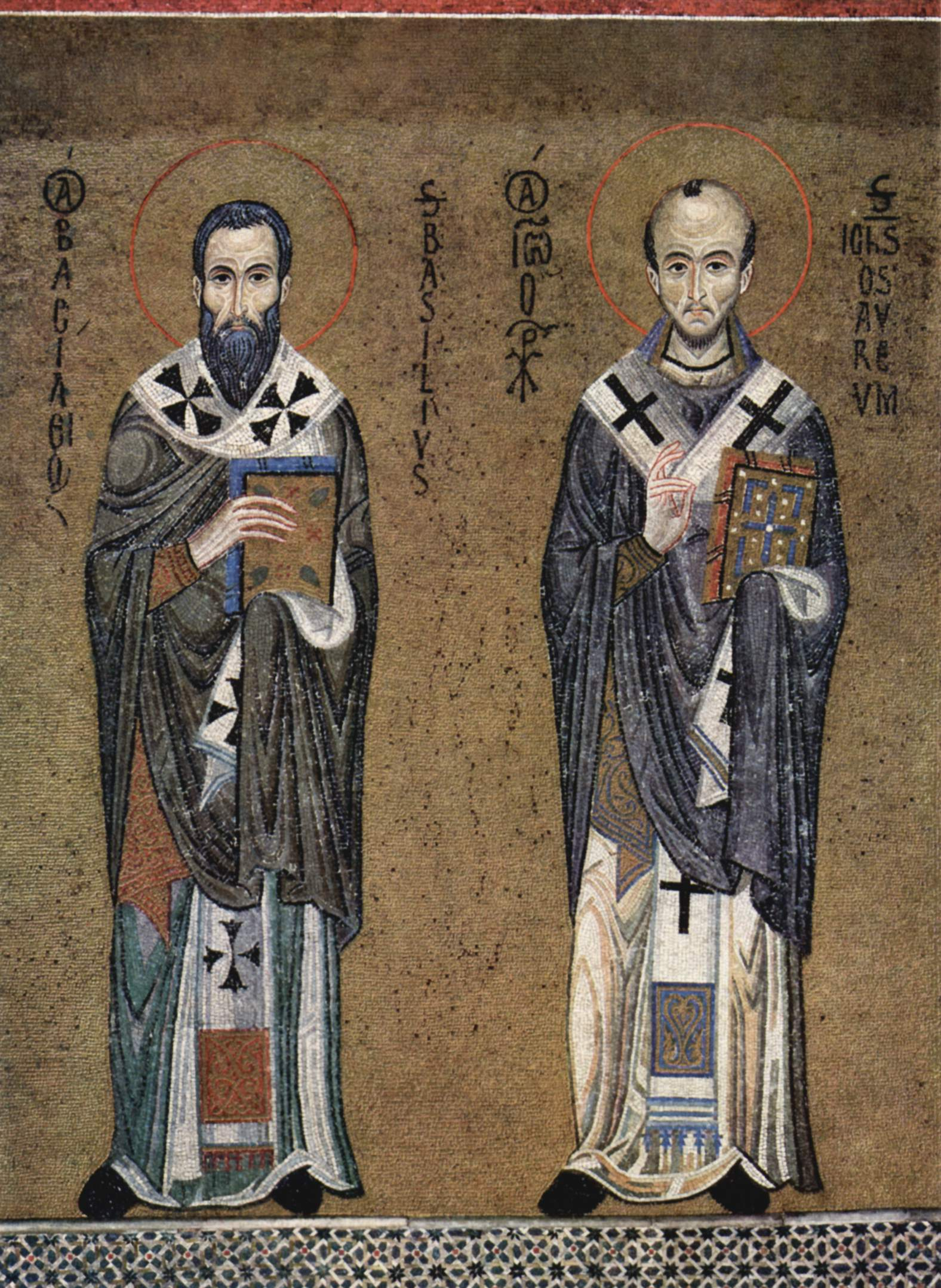
Icon of Ss. Basil the Great (left) and John Chrysostom, authors of the two most frequently used Eastern Orthodox Divine Liturgies, 1150 A.D. (mosaic in the Palatine Chapel, Palermo).

- Autocephalous churches of the Eastern Orthodox Church:
  - Albanian Orthodox Church
  - Bulgarian Orthodox Church
  - Church of Cyprus
  - Church of Greece
  - Ecumenical Patriarchate of Constantinople
  - Georgian Orthodox Church
  - Greek Orthodox Patriarchate of Alexandria
  - Greek Orthodox Patriarchate of Antioch
  - Greek Orthodox Patriarchate of Jerusalem
  - Orthodox Church of the Czech Lands and Slovakia
  - Polish Orthodox Church
  - Romanian Orthodox Church
  - Russian Orthodox Church
  - Serbian Orthodox Church
  - autonomous churches and churches with disputed autocephaly
- Non-canonical churches:
  - Autocephalous Turkish Orthodox Patriarchate
  - Belarusian Autocephalous Orthodox Church
  - Montenegrin Orthodox Church, through the BOC–Alternative Synod
- Old Calendarist and True Orthodox churches:
  - Church of the Genuine Orthodox Christians of Greece (Auxentius Synod), through the ROCOR
  - Church of the Genuine Orthodox Christians of Greece (Chrysostomos Synod)
  - Church of the Genuine Orthodox Christians of Greece (Matthew Synod)
  - Old Calendar Bulgarian Orthodox Church, through the Holy Synod of Resistance
  - Old Calendar Orthodox Church of Romania
  - Russian Orthodox Autonomous Church, through the ROCOR
  - Russian Orthodox Church Outside of Russia (Agathangel)

== Oriental Orthodoxy ==
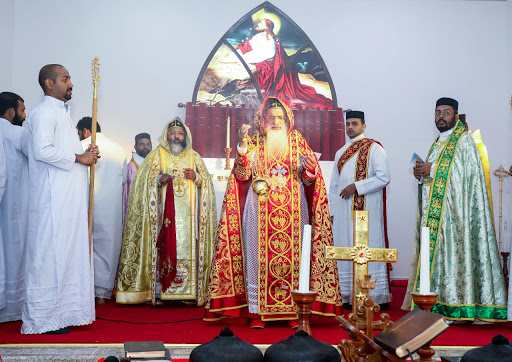
The celebration of the Holy Qurobo in a congregation of the Indian Orthodox Church.

Oriental Orthodox Churches:

- Armenian Apostolic Church
- Coptic Orthodox Church
- Eritrean Orthodox Tewahedo Church
- Ethiopian Orthodox Tewahedo Church
- Malankara Orthodox Syrian Church
- Syriac Orthodox Church

== Syriac Christianity ==
- Ancient Church of the East
- Assyrian Church of the East

Independent Saint Thomas Christian denominations:

- Mar Thoma Syrian Church
- Malabar Independent Syrian Church, through the Syriac Orthodox Church
- Believers Eastern Church, through United Protestant (Anglican) lines

== Evangelical-Lutheranism ==
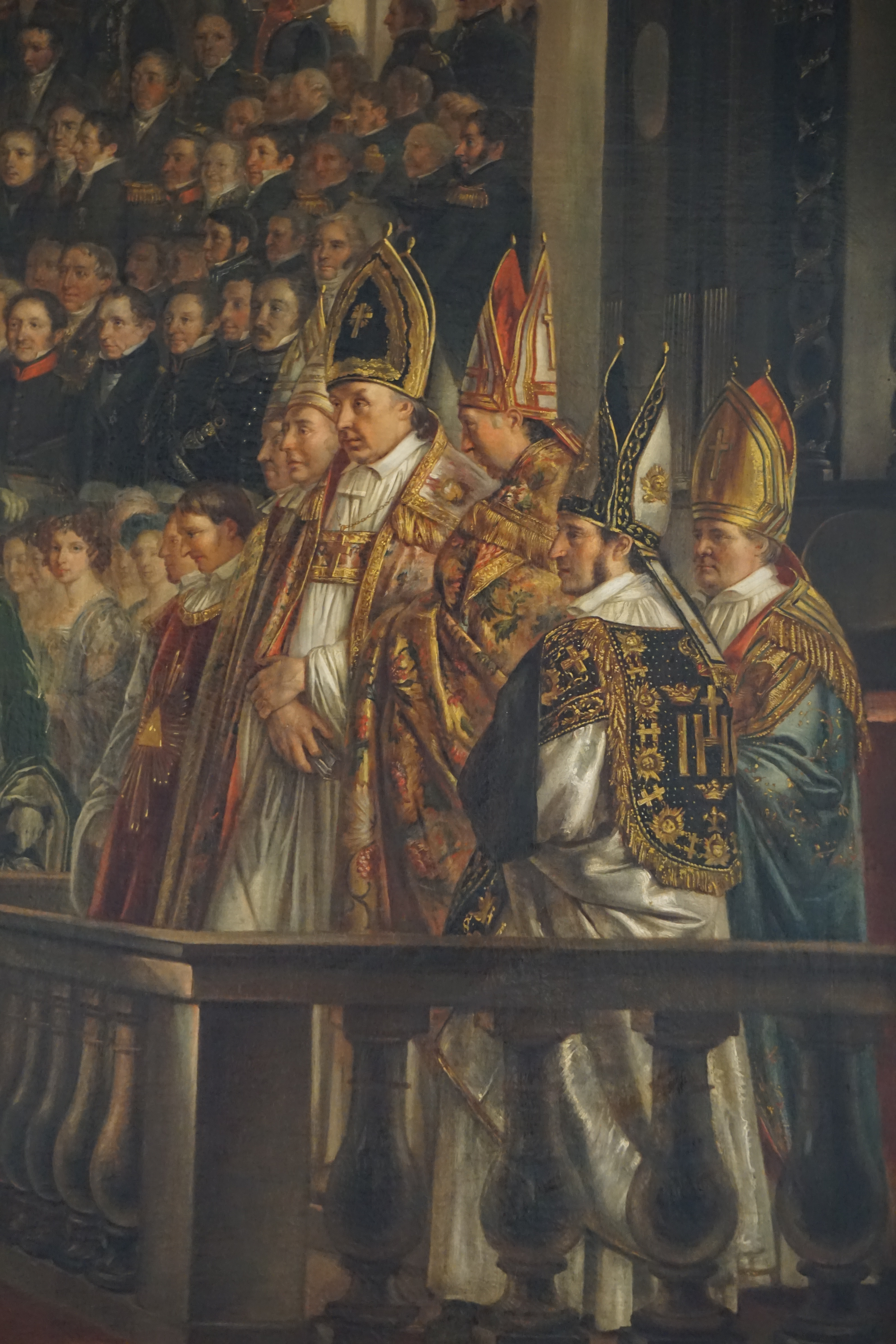
Karl XIV Johans kröning by Per Krafft the Younger (1818) depicting Evangelical-Lutheran bishops in Stockholm Cathedral

- Members of the Porvoo Communion:
  - Church of Denmark
  - Church of Iceland
  - Church of Norway
  - Church of Sweden
  - Church of the Faroe Islands
  - Estonian Evangelical Lutheran Church (EELK)
  - Evangelical Lutheran Church in Lithuania
  - Evangelical Lutheran Church of Finland
- Members of the Communion of Nordic Lutheran Dioceses:
  - Evangelical Lutheran Diocese of Norway
  - Evangelical Lutheran Mission Diocese of Finland, through Arne Olsson
  - Missionsprovinsen, through the ELCK
- North American Lutheran denominations:
  - Anglo-Lutheran Catholic Church, through Old Catholic and Independent Catholic churches
  - Evangelical Catholic Church
  - Lutheran Church - International
  - The Lutheran Evangelical Protestant Church (LEPC)
  - Lutheran Orthodox Church, the lineages include the Church of Sweden (Lutheran), Anglican/Episcopal, and Old Catholic.
- African denominations:
  - Evangelical Lutheran Church in Kenya (ELCK), through the ELCT
  - Evangelical Lutheran Church in Namibia, through the Finnish Church
  - Evangelical Lutheran Church in Southern Africa (ELCSA), through Helge Fosseus
  - Evangelical Lutheran Church in Tanzania (ELCT)
  - Evangelical Lutheran Church in Zimbabwe, through the Swedish Church
  - Lutheran Evangelical Church in Africa—Zambia Diocese, through Risto Soramies
- Other denominations:
  - Ceylon Evangelical Lutheran Church, through the ELCK
  - Evangelical Church of the Augsburg Confession in Slovakia, through Nathan Söderblom
  - Evangelical Lutheran Church of Ingria (ELCI), through the Finnish Church
  - Evangelical Lutheran Church in Jordan and the Holy Land, through Swedish and Finnish churches
  - Evangelical Lutheran Church of Latvia (LELB), observer of the Porvoo Communion
  - Hochkirchliche St. Johannes-Bruderschaft, through the Gallican Church of Southern France
  - Lutheran Church in Norway, through the LELB and ELCI
  - Salvadoran Lutheran Church, through Åke Kastlund
  - Siberian Evangelical Lutheran Church, through the EELK
  - Tamil Evangelical Lutheran Church, through Ernst Heuman

Denominations having bishops in the historical episcopate

Some Lutheran churches have a different understanding to apostolic succession but have bishops in succession lines for various reasons:

- Evangelical Church of the Augsburg Confession in Poland, through Ján Michalko
- Evangelical Lutheran Church in America, through Called to Common Mission (Note: Ordination by Anglican bishops is part of its full communion agreement.)
- Evangelical Lutheran Church in Bavaria, through the TEC
- Evangelical Lutheran Church in Canada, through Waterloo Declaration

== Moravianism/Hussitism ==
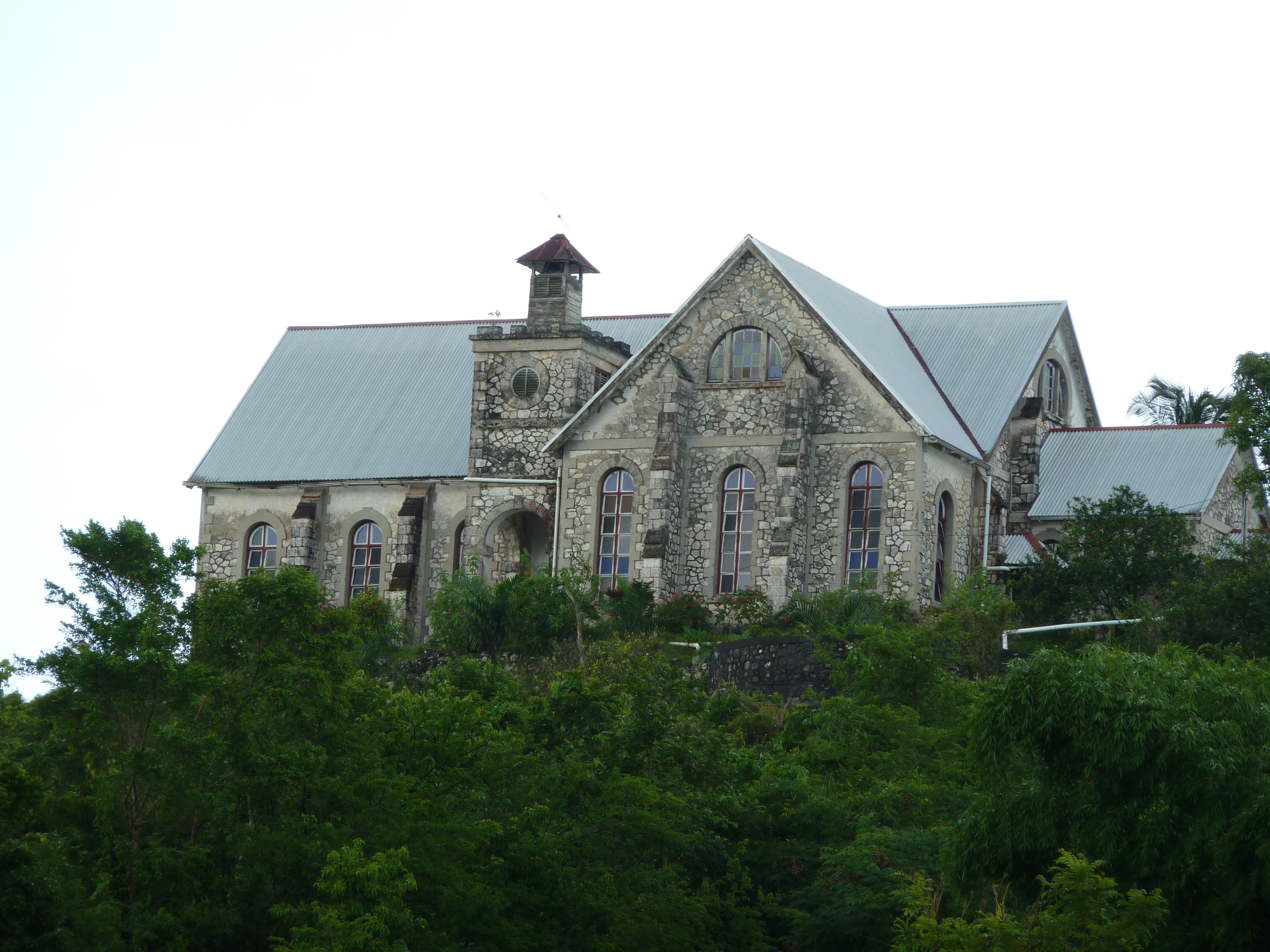
Moravian church in Jamaica

- Moravian Church

== Anglicanism ==
Provinces of the Anglican Communion:

- Anglican Church of Australia
- Anglican Church of Canada
- Anglican Church in Central America
- Anglican Church of Chile
- Anglican Church of Kenya
- Anglican Church of Korea
- Anglican Church of Melanesia
- Anglican Church of Mexico
- Anglican Church of Mozambique and Angola
- Anglican Church of Papua New Guinea
- Anglican Church of Rwanda
- Anglican Church of South America
- Anglican Church of Southern Africa
- Anglican Church of Tanzania
- Anglican Episcopal Church of Brazil
- Church in the Province of the West Indies
- Church in Wales
- Church of Bangladesh (United Church resulted from the merger of Anglican and Presbyterian denominations)
- Church of England
- Church of Ireland
- Church of Nigeria
- Church of North India (United Church resulted from the merger of Anglican, Brethren, Methodist, Congregationalist, Presbyterian and Stone–Campbellite denominations)
- Church of Pakistan (United Church resulted from the merger of Evangelical-Lutheran, Anglican, Methodist, and Presbyterian denominations)
- Church of South India (United Church resulted from the merger of Anglican, Congregationalist, Continental Reformed, Methodist and Presbyterian denominations)
- Church of the Province of Central Africa
- Church of the Province of Myanmar
- Church of the Province of South East Asia
- Church of the Province of the Indian Ocean
- Church of the Province of West Africa
- Church of Uganda
- Episcopal/Anglican Province of Alexandria
- Episcopal Church (TEC)
- Episcopal Church in Jerusalem and the Middle East
- Episcopal Church in the Philippines
- Hong Kong Sheng Kung Hui
- Province of the Anglican Church of Burundi
- Province of the Anglican Church of the Congo
- Province of the Episcopal Church of Sudan
- Province of the Episcopal Church of South Sudan
- Nippon Sei Ko Kai
- Scottish Episcopal Church

Anglican realignment

- Anglican Church in Brazil
- Anglican Church in North America
- Reformed Evangelical Anglican Church of South Africa
- Proto- and non-provincial GAFCON branches

Continuing Anglican movement

- Anglican Catholic Church
- Anglican Church in America
- Anglican Province of America
- Diocese of the Holy Cross
- Episcopal Missionary Church, through Donald Davies
- Holy Catholic Church Anglican Rite
- Orthodox Anglican Church, through Old Catholic and Eastern Orthodox lines
- Reformed Episcopal Church, through George David Cummins
- Traditional Anglican Church
- United Episcopal Church of North America

== Independent sacramental movement ==
Convergence Movement:

- Charismatic Episcopal Church
- Communion of Evangelical Episcopal Churches, through Roman Catholic, Armenian Orthodox, Nordic Lutheran, Anglican and Old Catholic lines

Western Rite Orthodox and other unrecognised Orthodox churches in Western Europe and the Americas:

- Autonomous Orthodox Metropolia of North and South America and the British Isles, through the Greek Old Calendarists
- British Orthodox Church, through Jules Ferrette
- Catholic Orthodox Church of France was part of the Russian and Romanian Orthodox churches
- Celtic Orthodox Church, through Jules Ferrette
- French Orthodox Apostolic Church, through Ernest Houssay
- French Orthodox Church, through Evloghios (Hessler) and the Jacobite lines
- Hispanic Orthodox Catholic Church, through Independent Catholic denominations, and the Eastern Orthodox and Eastern Catholic churches.
- Holy Synod of Milan, through the Greek Old Calendarists
- Lusitanian Catholic Orthodox Church, through Auxentius (Pastras) of the Auxentius Synod
- Orthodox-Catholic Church of America, through the Jacobite lines
