= Historical episcopate =

Group of bishops

In Christianity, the historic or historical episcopate comprises all episcopates, that is, it is the collective body of all the bishops of a group who claim to be in valid apostolic succession. This succession is transmitted from each bishop to their successors by the rite of holy orders typically involving the laying on of hands. It is sometimes subject of episcopal genealogy.

Not all Christian denominations maintain this succession, not all recognize the validity of other denomoniations' rites, and some historical claims of unbroken succession are disputed.

== Line of succession ==
In the churches that have well-documented ties to the history of Christianity as a whole, it is held that only a person in apostolic succession, a line of succession of bishops dating back to the apostles, can be a valid bishop; can validly ordain priests (presbyters), deacons and bishops; and can validly celebrate the sacraments of the Christian Church. Historical denominations include the Catholic Church, the Eastern Orthodox Church, the Oriental Orthodox Churches, the Nordic Evangelical-Lutheran churches (including those founded as a result of Swedish-Lutheran missionary activity, such as the Evangelical Lutheran Church of Latvia, Evangelical Lutheran Church in Zimbabwe, Evangelical Lutheran Church in Southern Africa, Evangelical Lutheran Church in Tanzania and Evangelical Lutheran Church in Kenya), the Moravian Church, the Old Catholic Church, the Anglican Communion, and the Assyrian Church of the East.

The definition of the historical episcopate is to some extent an open question. Bishops of the Evangelical Lutheran Church in America, for example, lay claim to the apostolic succession through the laying on of hands by Lutheran bishops in the historic episcopate, with bishops from the Moravian Church and Episcopal Church being present too as the full communion agreement came into fruition at that time. Some theologians, such as R.J. Cooke, have argued that the Methodist Church is also within the historic episcopate, being "in direct succession to the apostles through the bishops and patriarchs of the Eastern Church." An Anglican-Methodist Covenant states that:

Anglicans and Methodists are aware of the substantial ecumenical consensus that recognises that ministry within the historic episcopate should be a feature of united churches (as it already is of several in South Asia with whom Methodists and Anglicans are in communion).

=== Eastern Orthodoxy ===
The Eastern Orthodox Church's view has been summarised as: "While accepting the canonical possibility of recognising the existence (υποστατόν) of sacraments performed outside herself, (the Eastern Orthodox Church) questions their validity (έγκυρον) and certainly rejects their efficacy (ενεργόν)"; and it sees "the canonical recognition (αναγνώρισις) of the validity of sacraments performed outside the Orthodox Church (as referring) to the validity of the sacraments only of those who join the Orthodox Church (individually or as a body)."

In 1922, the Eastern Orthodox ecumenical patriarch of Constantinople recognised Anglican orders as valid, holding that they carry "the same validity as the Roman, Old Catholic and Armenian Churches possess". In the encyclical "From the Oecumenical Patriarch to the Presidents of the Particular Eastern Orthodox Churches", Patriarch Meletius IV of Constantinople wrote: "That the Orthodox theologians who have scientifically examined the question have almost unanimously come to the same conclusions and have declared themselves as accepting the validity of Anglican Orders." Following this declaration, in 1923, the Greek Orthodox Patriarchate of Jerusalem, as well as the Greek Orthodox Church of Cyprus agreed by "provisionally acceding that Anglican priests should not be re-ordained if they became Orthodox"; in 1936, the Romanian Orthodox Church "endorsed Anglican Orders". Historically, some Eastern Orthodox bishops have assisted in the consecration of Anglican bishops; for example, in 1870, Alexander Lycurgus, the Greek Orthodox archbishop of Syra and Tinos, was one of the bishops who consecrated Henry MacKenzie as the suffragan bishop of Nottingham.

=== Roman Catholicism ===
Because of changes in the ordinal (the rites of holy orders) under King Edward VI, the Roman Catholic Church does not recognize all Anglican holy orders as valid.

=== Evangelical-Lutheranism ===
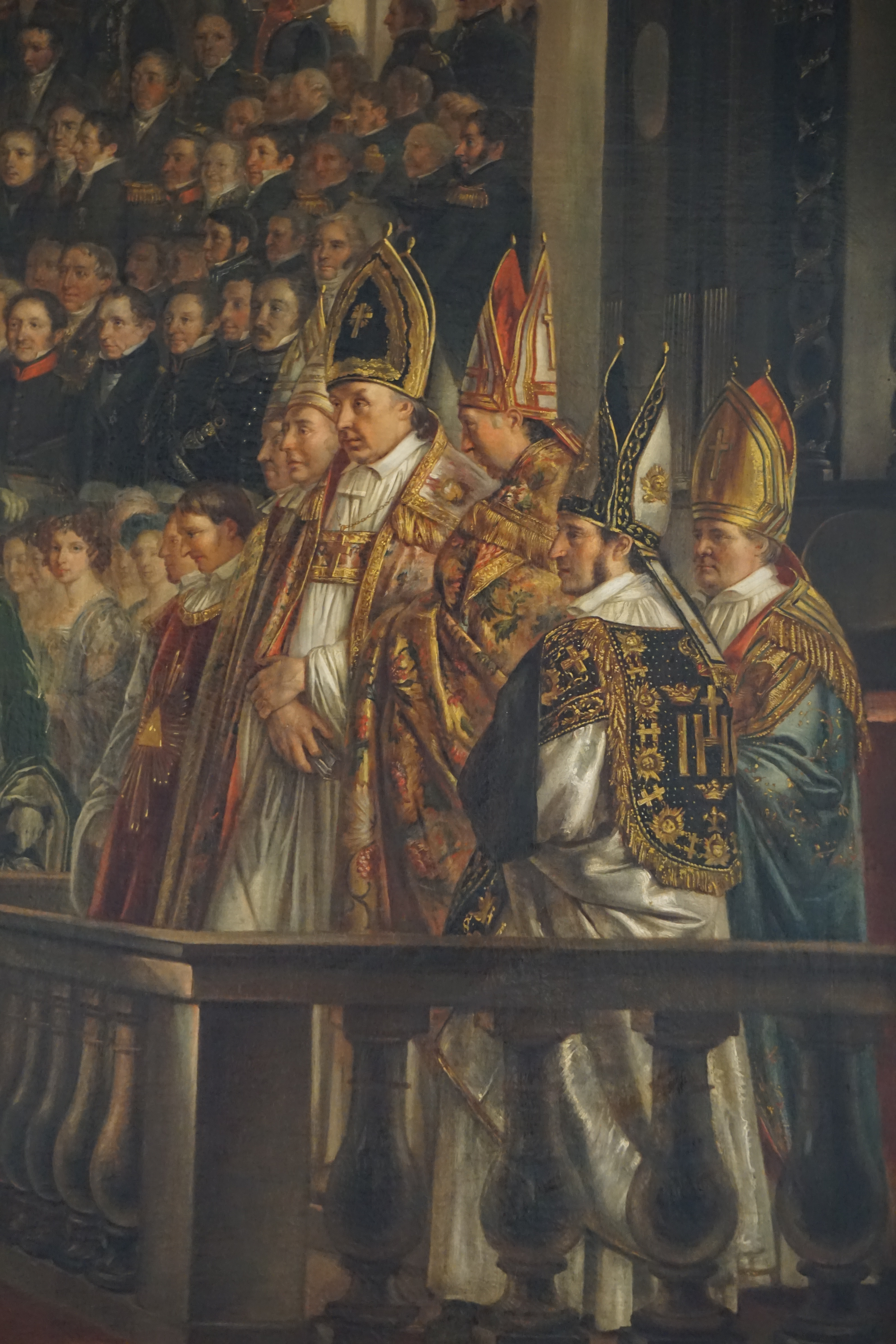
Karl XIV Johans kröning by Per Krafft the Younger (1818) depicting Evangelical-Lutheran bishops in Stockholm Cathedral

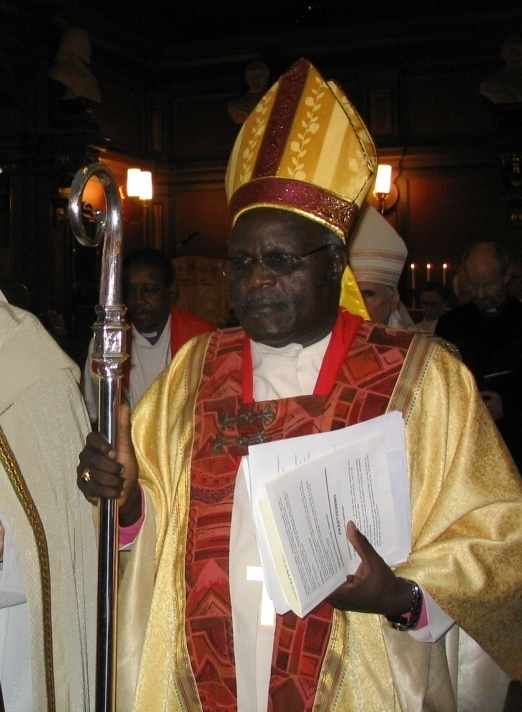
Walter Obare, Archbishop Emeritus of Nairobi and the Presiding Bishop Emeritus of the Evangelical Lutheran Church in Tanzania

Evangelical-Lutherans universally believe that "no one should publicly teach in the Church or administer the Sacraments unless he be regularly called". The Lutheran churches in northern Europe, and those established in other parts of the world as a result of Nordic Lutheran missionary activity (such as the Evangelical Lutheran Church in Kenya), practice episcopal succession in which the bishop whose holy orders can be traced back for centuries performs ordinations.

In the Nordic-Baltic region, Lutheran churches participating in the Porvoo Communion (those of Iceland, Norway, Sweden, Finland, Faroes, Estonia, and Lithuania), as well as non-Porvoo membership Lutheran churches in the region (including the Evangelical Lutheran Church of Latvia and the Evangelical Lutheran Church in Russia, Ukraine, Kazakhstan and Central Asia), and the confessional Communion of Nordic Lutheran Dioceses, believe that they ordain their bishops in apostolic succession in lines stemming from the original apostles. The New Westminster Dictionary of Church History states: "In Sweden the apostolic succession was preserved because the Catholic bishops were allowed to stay in office, but they had to approve changes in the ceremonies".

What made the Church of Sweden an evangelical-catholic church was to Archbishop Söderblom the fact that the Reformation in Sweden was a 'church improvement' and a 'process of purification' which did not create a new church. As a national church, the Church of Sweden succeeded in bringing together medieval Swedish tradition with the rediscovery of the gospel which the Reformation brought with it. Archbishop Söderblom included the historic episcopate in the tradition-transmitting elements. The Church of Sweden was, according to Söderblom, in an even higher degree than the Anglican Church a via media. —Together in Mission and Ministry: The Porvoo Common Statement

The Lutheran Church of Finland was at that time one with the Church of Sweden and so holds the same view regarding the see of Åbo/Turku. Jānis Vanags, the Archbishop of Riga, was consecrated in 1993 by Swedish bishop Henrik Svenungsson, bringing the Swedish line of apostolic succession to the Evangelical Lutheran Church of Latvia.

Included in the historic episcopate are Evangelical-Lutheran churches that were formed through Nordic missionary activity. Ernst Heuman, who served as the first presiding bishop of the Tamil Evangelical Lutheran Church in India, was ordained a priest in 1896 by Knut Henning Gezelius von Schéele (the Bishop of Visby) and consecrated as a bishop on 7 March 1921 by Hjalmar Danell (the Bishop of Skara) at New Jerusalem Church in the Indian city of Tranquebar (authorized by Archbishop of Uppsala Nathan Söderblom); Hjalmar Danell was confirmed as the Bishop of Tranquebar. The Swedish Line of apostolic succession was thus given to the Evangelical Lutheran Church in India.

Bengt Sundkler was ordained a priest by Erik Berggrav in 1936 and then consecrated as a bishop in the Church of Sweden by Gunnar Hultgren at Uppsala Cathedral on 2 April 1961; he was elected as the Bishop of Bukoba in the Evangelical Lutheran Church of Buhaya in June 1960. Bengt Sundkler, on 16 December 1984, consecrated Josiah Kibira as bishop at Bukoba Evangelical-Lutheran Cathedral and Josiah Kibira reigned as the bishop of the North-Western Diocese of the Evangelical Lutheran Church in Tanzania (ELCT) until 2000, later becoming the president of the Lutheran World Federation. It is through the consecration of Josiah Kibira by Bengt G. M. Sundkler that apostolic succession from the Church of Sweden (in the line of Peder Månsson) was transmitted to what is now the Evangelical Lutheran Church in Tanzania. In 1979, Josiah Kibira and Bengt Sundkler consecrated Paulo Mukuta a bishop, who served as the Bishop of Karagwe in the Evangelical Lutheran Church of Tanzania. In 1984, Paulo Mukuta and Tore Furberg consecrated Samson Mushemba, who served as Bishop of the North Western Diocese in the Evangelical Lutheran Church of Tanzania. In 2002, Samson Mushemba, as Archbishop of Arusha, and Olavi Rimpiläinen consecrated Walter Obare, who became the presiding bishop of the Evangelical Lutheran Church in Kenya.

On 30 June 1963, Eelis Gulin of the Evangelical Lutheran Church of Finland consecrated as a bishop Leonard Auala of the Evangelical Lutheran Owambo-Kavango Church, incorporating the Evangelical Lutheran Owambo-Kavango Church into the Swedish–Finnish line of apostolic succession.

The last Church of Sweden missionary bishop of the Evangelical Lutheran Church of Southern Rhodesia (now known as the Evangelical Lutheran Church in Zimbabwe) was Sigfrid Strandvik, who consecrated on 18 May 1975, Jonas Chiwariro Shiri in the Swedish Line (Uppsala Line) of apostolic succession.

On 19 September 1971, the first bishop of the Evangelical Lutheran Church in Southern Africa, Paulus Ben Mhlungu, was consecrated a bishop by Swedish bishop Helge Fosseus, bringing the Uppsala Line of apostolic succession into the nascent body.

=== Anglicanism ===
In the sixteenth century a solid body of Anglican opinion emerged which saw the theological importance of the historic episcopate (Note: The phrase "historic episcopate" is far more common in Anglican writings than "historical episcopate") but refused to 'unchurch' those churches which did not retain it. The preface to the Ordinal limits itself to stating historical reasons why episcopal orders are to 'be continued and reverently used in the Church of England'. Before 1662 it was assumed that the foreign Reformed (Presbyterian) churches were genuine ones with an authentic ministry of Word and Sacrament. The 1662 Act of Uniformity formally excluded from pastoral office in England any who lacked episcopal ordination but this was a reaction against the abolition of episcopacy in the Commonwealth period. The majority of Anglicans, including those of low church, broad church and high churchmanship, have "followed the major continental Reformers in their doctrine of the true church, identifiable by the authentic ministry of word and sacrament, in their rejection of the jurisdiction of the pope, and in their alliance with the civil authority ('the magistrate')". The Church of England historically considered itself "Protestant and Reformed" and recognized as true churches the Continental Reformed churches, participating in the Synod of Dort in 1618-1619.

As the divergences between the theory of 'the godly prince' and the practices of monarchs—i.e. the titular head of the Church of England—like James II (who was a convert to Catholicism and had ordered the trial of the Seven Bishops) and William III (who had undermined the divine right of kings and caused the Nonjuring schism by deposing James II) became more obvious, John Pearson (Note: Bishop of Chester (1674-83) and "probably the most erudite and profound divine of a learned and theological age." (Oxford Dictionary of the Christian Church)) and William Beveridge (Note: Bishop of St. Asaph, Wales (1704-08), author of an Exposition of the Thirty-Nine Articles (Oxford Dictionary of the Christian Church)) saw the "Apostolical Office" of the bishop as a guarantee of the Church's identity and this formed the background to the vital emphasis placed on it by John Henry Newman and the other Tractarians, through whom it passed into Anglo-Catholic thought.

The modern debate divides three ways: between those who see the "historic episcopate" to be constitutive of the church (of the esse); those who hold it is a question of its "well-being" (bene esse); and those who consider that it is necessary for the Church to be fully itself (plene esse). The Chicago-Lambeth Quadrilateral includes the "historic episcopate" as "essential to the visible unity of the church", but allows for its being adapted locally in its working to the varying needs of those who God calls into the unity of the church. However, this has not meant a general commitment to the idea that in its absence there is no church.

== See also ==
- Episcopal polity
- Apostolicae curae
- Annual conference of the United Methodist Church
- Canon law (Catholic Church)
- Episcopi vagantes
- Jurisprudence of Catholic canon law
- List of denominations claiming apostolic succession

== Notes and references ==
=== Bibliography ===
- Cooke, Richard Joseph (1896). The Historic Episcopate: A Study of Anglican Claims and Methodist Orders. New York: Eaton & Mains.
- An Anglican-Methodist Covenant: Common Statement of the Formal Conversations Between the Methodist Church of Great Britain and the Church of England. Church House Publishing. 2001. ISBN 978-1-85852-218-0.
- Carey, Kenneth Moir (1954). "The Next Step". In Kenneth Moir Carey (ed.). The Historic Episcopate in the Fullness of the Church. Seven Essays by Priests of the Church of England. Edited by K. M. Carey (Bishop of Edinburgh). Dacre Press.
- Montefiore, H.W (1954). "The Historic Episcopate". In Kenneth Moir Carey (ed.). The Historic Episcopate in the Fullness of the Church. Seven Essays by Priests of the Church of England. Edited by K. M. Carey (Bishop of Edinburgh). Dacre Press.
- Bransom, Charles N. (1990). Ordinations of U.S. Catholic Bishops, 1790-1989: A Chronological List. National Conference of Catholic Bishops, U.S. Catholic Conference. ISBN 978-1-55586-323-4.
- Norris, Richard A. (1988). "Church, Sacraments and Ministry". In Booty & Sykes (ed.). The Study of Anglicanism. SPCK / Fortress Press. ISBN 978-0-8006-2087-5.
- Evans, Gillian Rosemary; Wright, John Robert (1991). The Anglican Tradition: A Handbook of Sources. SPCK. ISBN 978-0-281-04496-2.
