= Communion of Nordic Lutheran Dioceses =

The Communion of Nordic Lutheran Dioceses are Lutheran dioceses that entered into schism with their nordic traditional national churches in 2003 due to what they perceived as "the secularization of the national/state churches in their respective countries involving matters of both Christian doctrine and ethics". These dioceses are members of the International Lutheran Council, a body of Confessional Lutherans, they are in full communion with one another and include the Evangelical Lutheran Mission Diocese of Finland, Mission Province of the Church of Sweden, and the Evangelical Lutheran Diocese of Norway. These dioceses entered into schism with the Evangelical Lutheran Church of Finland, Church of Sweden, and Church of Norway, respectively, though the Mission Province considers itself to be a non-territorial diocese within the Church of Sweden. Their lines of apostolic succession derive from other traditional Lutheran Churches, such as the Evangelical Lutheran Church in Kenya; Walter Obare Omwanza, presiding bishop of the Evangelical Lutheran Church in Kenya, assisted by bishops Leonid Zviki from Belarus, David Tswaedi from South Africa, Børre Knudsen and Ulf Asp from Norway, consecrated Arne Olsson in apostolic succession as the Ordinary for the Mission Province. The first bishop of the Evangelical Lutheran Mission Diocese of Finland, Risto Soramies, was then ordained by Matti Väisänen of the Mission Province of the Church of Sweden. These dioceses have an Evangelical Catholic churchmanship, reflective of the influence of High Church Lutheranism and Pietist Lutheranism in Scandinavia. As such, the Communion of Nordic Lutheran Dioceses affirms:

We believe, teach and confess that biblical faith and doctrine which is founded on the prophetic and apostolic Scriptures of the New and the Old Testament and which has been expressed in the three main creeds of the Early Church, that is, the Apostolic, the Nicene-Constantinopolitan and the Athanasian Creed, and in the unaltered Augsburg Confession, and that is rightly and bindingly explained by all the books accepted into the Book of Concord of the Lutheran Church.

In the view of the Communion of Nordic Lutheran Dioceses, "it has retained the historic teachings and practice that the politically selected church structure has abandoned, it is a believing remnant of those churches."
