= Istanbul Lutheran Church =

Small church body in Turkey

- Orientation: High Church Lutheranism Lutheran
- Theology: Confessional Lutheran
- Leader: Rev. Feymi Madzhirov
- Associations: International Lutheran Council
- Region: Turkey, Bulgaria
- Headquarters: Istanbul
- Congregations: 4
- Members: 200
- Official website: https://www.luteryenkilisesi.org/

The Istanbul Lutheran Church (ILK) is a small national Turkish-speaking Lutheran church body in Turkey, with the church also establishing congregations in Bulgaria. The Istanbul Lutheran Church is estimated to have around 200 members. The ILK was founded by Risto Soramies, who also became the first bishop of the Evangelical Lutheran Mission Diocese of Finland.

The Istanbul Lutheran Church is associated with the International Lutheran Council.

== History ==
The Istanbul Lutheran Church was officially founded on December 22, 2004. The Parish is led by a council of elders together with presiding pastor Ville Typpö. Istanbul Lutheran Church has two parishes in Turkey: Istanbul Parish and Izmir Parish. And two Parishes in Bulgaria: Peshtera Parish and Chapel Parish in Krushevo village (belongs to Parvomay City).

In November 2006 Turkish-speaking Lutheran Parish in Mannheim, Germany, joined Istanbul Lutheran Church. Istanbul Lutheran Church has approximately 120 members. Lutheranism has been in Turkey since 1709, when Sweden sent the first Lutheran priest to Constantinople. Istanbul Lutheran Church's weekly activities are Church services, Bible study groups, Sunday schools and Bible classes. On April 6, 2025 the church consecrated Feymi Madzhirov as its first bishop, with the consecration being done by bishops from the Church of Ingria, the Mission Diocese of Finland and the Evangelical Lutheran Church of Latvia.

== Doctrine ==
In the brochure of Istanbul Lutheran Church is the following statement: "Istanbul Lutheran Church confesses the Christian faith based on the Holy Bible, the witness of the Old and New Testaments to the Triune God, the Father, the Son and the Holy Spirit. This faith is expressed in three ecumenical creeds and in the Lutheran Confessions."

== See also ==
- Palais de Suède, Istanbul
