= Nordic Catholic Church =

Old Catholic church body based in Norway

- Nordisk Katolske Kirke
- Classification: Old Catholic
- Scripture: Holy Bible
- Theology: Ultrajectine
- Polity: Episcopal
- Prime bishop: Roald Nikolai Flemestad (2011-2024)
- Associations: Union of Scranton
- Region: Europe
- Origin: 1999
- Separated from: Church of Norway
- Official website: nordiccatholic.com‘

The Nordic Catholic Church (NCC; Norwegian: den nordisk-katolske kirke), formerly known as the Lutheran Free Synod of Norway, is an Old Catholic church body patrimony, that is based in Norway. The church is a member of the Union of Scranton.

== History ==
The Nordic Catholic Church was founded in 1999 by a group of traditional-minded people belonging to the "orthodox opposition" in the Lutheran state Church of Norway when they left the state church due to, for example, the ordination of women to the priesthood and episcopate. During the process both the Free Synod of the Evangelical Lutheran Church of Sweden and the Anglican Forward in Faith organisation were kept fully informed. In Sweden it was paralleled by the foundation of the Mission Province of the Evangelical Lutheran Church of Sweden. Bishop Roald Nikolai, with respect to the name of the denomination, emphasized that Lutherans have historically referred to themselves as "catholic":

Luther himself maintained that his faith was catholic, and that he confessed the credal article of faith concerning the "Catholic" Church (WA 8. 96). Melanchton likewise emphasized that "we must all be catholic" (CR 24.399). In the Augsburg Confession of 1530 we also read that the doctrine of the Reformation "does not deviate from that of the Catholic Church (ecclesia catholica) in any article of faith, but only renounces a few misuses, that are new and have erroneously been included against the intention of church law". When discussing papal innovations, Reformation theologians claimed to hold a doctrinal standpoint that "neither deviates from Holy Scripture nor the Universal Church nor the Roman Church as we know it from the Fathers". (CA XXI:1)

The "Statement of Faith" of the Nordic Catholic Church states that it adheres to its Lutheran heritage to the extent that it has embraced and transmitted the orthodox and catholic faith of the undivided church, therefore also embracing the Old Catholic faith as taught by the Polish National Catholic Church.

Along with the Polish National Catholic Church, the NCC is a member church of the Union of Scranton.

== Old Catholic Church in Italy (Nordic Catholic Church vicariate) ==
In 2011, a fraction of a group named Orthodox Church in Italy was organized as an association in memory of its deceased primate, Antonio De Rosso, under the name 'Association of Metropolitan Antonio' (Italian: Associazione "Metropolita Antonio"). In 2013, the association was reorganized as the Old Catholic Church in Italy, and in 2015 it became a vicariate of the Nordic Catholic Church.

== Ecumenical relationships ==
Dialogue with the United States Conference of Catholic Bishops, with the approval of the Holy See, led in 1996 to an arrangement that Laurence J. Orzell has called "limited inter-communion". What this means is that the Catholic Church recognizes the validity of the sacraments of the Union of Scranton, and allows members of the Latin Church and Eastern Catholic Churches in particular exceptional circumstances, defined in Canon 844 of the 1983 Code of Canon Law of the Latin Church and the parallel canon 671 of the Code of Canons of the Eastern Churches, that are regulated by the diocesan bishop or conference of bishops, to receive three sacraments from Union of Scranton ministers. Canon 844 allows those Catholics who can avoid error and indifferentism and are unable to approach a Catholic minister to receive, under certain conditions, the sacraments of Reconciliation, Eucharist, and Anointing of the Sick from "non-Catholic ministers, ministers in whose churches these sacraments are valid". This canon declares it licit for Catholic priests to administer the same three sacraments to members of churches which the Holy See judges to be in the same condition in regard to the sacraments as the Eastern churches, if they ask for the sacraments of their own accord and are properly disposed. Obstacles to full communion include different understandings about papal primacy, the level of involvement of the laity in church governance, and the Union of Scranton's reception of some former Roman Catholic clergy, most of whom subsequently married.

The Union of Scranton has been also in ecumenical dialogue since 2018 with numerous jurisdictions from the continuing Anglican movement: the Anglican Catholic Church, the Anglican Province of America, and the Anglican Church in America—commonly referred to as the G-3. Progress has been steady, and the potential for full communion is said to be on the horizon and nearing quickly.

Since 2012, the Union of Scranton has been in dialogue with the Free Church of England.

== See also ==
- Evangelical Lutheran Diocese of Norway
- Evangelical Lutheran Mission Diocese of Finland
- Missionsprovinsen
