= Apostolic see =

Area of ecclesiastical jurisdiction

An apostolic see is an episcopal see whose foundation is attributed to one or more of the apostles of Jesus or to one of their close associates. In Catholicism, the phrase "the Apostolic See" when capitalized refers specifically to the See of Rome.

Tertullian (c. 155 − c. 240) gives examples of apostolic sees: he describes as churches "in which the very thrones of the apostles are still pre-eminent in their places, in which their own authentic writings are read, uttering the voice and representing the face of each of them severally" the following churches: Corinth, Philippi, Ephesus, and Rome.

Tertullian says that from these "all the other churches, one after another, derived the tradition of the faith, and the seeds of doctrine, and are every day deriving them, that they may become churches. Indeed, it is on this account only that they will be able to deem themselves apostolic, as being the offspring of apostolic churches".

== Cited by early apologists for doctrinal authority ==
Tertullian himself and the slightly earlier Irenaeus (c. 130 – c. 200) speak of the succession of bishops of sees founded directly by the apostles as sources for sure Christian doctrine.

Irenaeus argues that, to know what is true Christian doctrine, it is enough to learn the teaching of some of the oldest churches or at least one, in particular that of Rome: "If the apostles had known hidden mysteries, which they were in the habit of imparting to 'the perfect' apart and privily from the rest, they would have delivered them especially to those to whom they were also committing the churches themselves. [...] Suppose there arise a dispute relative to some important question among us, should we not have recourse to the most ancient churches with which the apostles held constant intercourse, and learn from them what is certain and clear in regard to the present question?"

Tertullian's arguing is similar: From the apostles the churches they founded received the doctrine that the apostles received directly from Christ, and from those churches the more recent churches received the same doctrine. Every heresy is more recent and, being different, is erroneous.

== Distinct from jurisdictional authority ==
Jurisdictional authority of particular episcopal sees over others is not necessarily associated with the apostolic origin of the see. Thus, the fourth canon of the First Council of Nicaea of 325 attributed to the bishop of the capital (metropolis) of each Roman province (the "metropolitan bishop") a position of authority among the bishops of the province, without reference to the founding figure of that bishop's see.

Its sixth canon the same council recognized the wider authority, extending beyond a single imperial province, traditionally held by Rome and Alexandria, and the prerogatives of the churches in Antioch and the other provinces.

Of Aelia, the Roman city built on the site of the destroyed city of Jerusalem, the council's seventh canon reads: "Since custom and ancient tradition have prevailed that the Bishop of Aelia should be honoured, let him, saving its due dignity to the Metropolis, have the next place of honour." The metropolis in question is generally taken to be Caesarea Maritima, though in the late 19th century Philip Schaff also mentioned other views.

The see of Constantinople was elevated to a position of jurisdictional prominence not on the grounds of apostolic origin but because of its political importance as the capital of the Roman Empire. The First Council of Constantinople (381), held in what by then had been the political capital for half a century, decreed in a canon of disputed validity: "The Bishop of Constantinople, however, shall have the prerogative of honour after the Bishop of Rome; because Constantinople is New Rome." It was later ranked second among the sees in the theory of Pentarchy: "[F]ormulated in the legislation of the emperor Justinian I (527–565), especially in his Novella 131, the theory received formal ecclesiastical sanction at the Council in Trullo (692), which ranked the five sees as Rome, Constantinople, Alexandria, Antioch, and Jerusalem."

For another pentarchic see, that of Alexandria, the reputed founder and close associate of the apostle Peter, Saint Mark, is not called an apostle in the New Testament.

== Sees or churches viewed as founded by apostles or their close associates ==
- Alexandria (Coptic, Coptic Catholic, Greek Orthodox): Saint Mark the Evangelist
- Antioch (Greek Orthodox, Maronite, Melkite, Syriac Catholic, Syriac Orthodox): Saint Peter
- Aquileia: Saint Mark the Evangelist as one of the Seventy Apostles
- Armenia (Armenian Apostolic Church, Armenian Catholic Church): Thaddaeus (Jude the Apostle) and Bartholomew the Apostle
- Athens: Saint Paul
- Bulgarian Orthodox Church: Saint Andrew
- Constantinople: Saint Andrew
- Corinth: Saint Paul
- Cyprus, based at New Justiniana (Erdek): Saint Paul and Saint Barnabas
- Ephesus: John the Apostle and Saint Paul
- Ethiopian Orthodox Tewahedo Church maintains that Christianity was originally introduced to Ethiopia through Saint Philip the Evangelist
- Georgian Orthodox Church: Saint Andrew and Saint Simon the Canaanite
- Goa and Maharashtra: Bartholomew the Apostle – Roman martyrology of the Catholic Church mentions a tradition that Bartholomew the Apostle preached in India. The studies of Fr A.C. Perumalil SJ and Moraes hold that the Bombay region on the Konkan coast, a region which may have been known as the ancient city Kalyan, was the field of Saint Bartholomew's missionary activities. Another unofficial book entitled ‘Martyrdom of Bartholomew’ says that, though he is generally said to have been martyred in Armenia, he was martyred in India. In these texts, two kings named Polyamus and Astriyagis have been described. Circa AD 55 the king named Pulaimi ruled near Kalyan, who in Latin language is called as Polyamus and King Aristakarman, who succeeded Pulaimi, might have a Latin name of Astriyais and it is in Goan tradition that the Apostle preached in Goa and Maharashtra.
- Jerusalem (Greek Orthodox, Latin): Saint Peter and Saint James
- Malta: Saint Paul
- Milan: Saint Barnabas
- Patras: Saint Andrew
- Philippi: Saint Paul
- Romania: Saint Andrew, who is said to have preached in Scythia (identified with Scythia Minor, Dobruja, and the Metropolitan of Tomis).
- Rome: Saint Peter and Saint Paul
- The Russian Orthodox Church and the Orthodox Church of Ukraine claim a connection with Saint Andrew, who is said to have visited the area where the city of Kyiv later arose.
- Saint Thomas Christians of Kerala claim a connection with Thomas the Apostle; they are now divided between (in alphabetic order): Chaldean Syrian Church, Jacobite Syrian Christian Church, Malabar Independent Syrian Church, Malankara Orthodox Syrian Church, Mar Thoma Syrian Church, St. Thomas Evangelical Church of India, Syro-Malabar Catholic Church, Syro-Malankara Catholic Church
- Santiago de Compostela: Saint James the Great
- Seleucia-Ctesiphon or Babylon (claimed by, in alphabetical order, Ancient Church of the East, Assyrian Church of the East, Chaldean Catholic Church): Thomas the Apostle, Bartholomew the Apostle, and Thaddeus of Edessa
- Syracuse: Saint Peter
- Thessalonica: Saint Paul

== Apostles or their close associates claimed as founders of sees ==
- Andrew: Bulgarian Orthodox Church, Constantinople, Corinth, Georgian Orthodox Church, Patras, Romanian Orthodox Church, Russian Orthodox Church, Orthodox Church of Ukraine
- Barnabas: Cyprus, Milan
- Bartholomew: Armenian Apostolic Church, Armenian Catholic Church, Babylon
- James, brother of Jesus: Jerusalem (Greek Orthodox, Latin)
- James the Great: Santiago de Compostela
- John: Ephesus
- Mark: Alexandria (Coptic, Coptic Catholic, Greek Orthodox), Aquileia
- Paul: Athens, Cyprus, Malta, Philippi, Rome, Thessalonica, Illyria (Albanian Orthodox Church)
- Peter: Antioch (Greek Orthodox, Maronite, Melkite, Syriac Catholic, Syriac Orthodox), Jerusalem (Greek Orthodox, Latin), Rome, Syracuse
- Philip the Evangelist: Ethiopian Orthodox Tewahedo Church
- Simon the Canaanite: Georgian Orthodox Church
- Thaddaeus/Jude the Apostle: Armenian Apostolic Church, Armenian Catholic Church, Ancient Church of the East, Assyrian Church of the East, Chaldean Catholic Church (Babylon)
- Thaddeus of Edessa: Ancient Church of the East, Assyrian Church of the East, Chaldean Catholic Church (Babylon)
- Thomas: Ancient Church of the East, Assyrian Church of the East, Chaldean Catholic Church (Babylon); Saint Thomas Christians. The latter are now divided between (in alphabetical order): Chaldean Syrian Church, Jacobite Syrian Christian Church, Malabar Independent Syrian Church, Malankara Orthodox Syrian Church, Mar Thoma Syrian Church, St. Thomas Evangelical Church of India, Syro-Malabar Catholic Church, Syro-Malankara Catholic Church

== Rome as the Apostolic See ==
By a long-standing usage, evidenced already in 431, when the Council of Ephesus, the third ecumenical council, employed the phrase "our most holy and blessed pope Cœlestine, bishop of the Apostolic See", the expression, "the Apostolic See", is used in the singular and capitalized to mean specifically the Holy See and represent the Pope as head of the worldwide Catholic Church and successor of Saint Peter.

In Catholic canon law, the term is applied also to the various departments of the Roman Curia. The Code of Canon Law states: "In this Code the terms Apostolic See or Holy See mean not only the Roman Pontiff, but also, unless the contrary is clear from the nature of things or from the context, the Secretariat of State, the Council for the public affairs of the Church, and the other Institutes of the Roman Curia." The bodies in question are seen as speaking on behalf of the See of Rome.

== See also ==
- Apostolic History Network
- Apostolic succession
- Dispersion of the apostles
- Early centers of Christianity
- List of denominations claiming apostolic succession
