= Episcopate (disambiguation) =

Episcopate can refer to

- the rank or fact of being a bishop
- a group of bishops that together form a historical episcopate
- episcopal polity, a form of organization of a Christian church
