= Antonio De Rosso =

Italian bishop (1941–2009)

Antonio De Rosso (Farra di Soligo, 8 February 1941 – Aprilia, Lazio, 20 February 2009) was an Italian priest and Christian leader who successively belonged to various Christian denominations. After initial priestly service in the Catholic Church, he changed several affiliations (in the cadre of the Old Catholicism). Eventually, he became Eastern Orthodox bishop (1986), founder of the Orthodox Church in Italy (1991), Metropolitan of Ravenna and Italy (1997–2009), and Archbishop of L'Aquila (2009).

He was associated with various independent noncanonical Christian jurisdictions. The main goal of his religious activity was to create a national church in Italy.

== Biography ==
He was born in 1941 in Farra di Soligo (near Treviso, Veneto), in a Roman Catholic family. In 1968, he was ordained priest of the Roman Catholic Diocese of Vittorio Veneto by Bishop Albino Luciani, who later became Pope John Paul I (1978). By 1983, he had left the Catholic Church, associating himself in succession with several Christian denominations linked to the Old Catholicism. Eventually, after founding the Old Catholic Church in Italy, he converted to Eastern Orthodoxy, entering into communion with the Old Calendarist movement. In 1986, he became bishop of Aprilia and Latium, under the jurisdiction of Metropolitan Kyprianos Koutsoumpas of Oropos and Fili, leader of the Old Calendarist Orthodox Church of Greece (Holy Synod in Resistance).

In 1991, he founded the Orthodox Church in Italy (Italian: Chiesa Ortodossa in Italia), aspiring to create a national church in his country. In 1993, he tried to enter into communion with the Bulgarian Orthodox Church, and presented himself to Metropolitan Simeon (Kostadinov), head of the Bulgarian Orthodox Eparchy of Western Europe. Failing to achieve canonical recognition, he turned to the newly formed Alternative Synod of the Bulgarian Orthodox Church. In 1995, he became a Bishop of Ravenna and Italy, and in 1997 he was raised to the rank of a Metropolitan of Ravenna and Italy, becoming a member of the Alternative Synod of the Bulgarian Orthodox Church, as the head of the autonomous Orthodox Church in Italy. Metropolitan Antonio was also in communion with leaders of several other non-canonical jurisdictions, including Patriarch Filaret Denysenko of the Ukrainian Orthodox Church (Kyiv Patriarchate), and Metropolitan Mihailo Dedeić of the Montenegrin Orthodox Church.

In January 2009, he moved his seat to L'Aquila, and took the title Archbishop of L'Aquila, but fell ill and died on 20 February 2009.

After his death, his Orthodox Church in Italy was divided between two factions. A faction was headed by his associate, Archbishop Basilio Grillo-Miceli, who created the Orthodox Church of Italy (Italian: Chiesa Ortodossa d'Italia). The original branch, instead, was organized as an association in memory of its deceased primate (Italian: Associazione "Metropolita Antonio"), and later joined the Nordic Catholic Church, retaining the name of the Orthodox Church in Italy.

== See also ==
- Eastern Orthodoxy in Italy
