= Josiah Kibira =

Evangelical-Lutheran bishop

The Most Reverend Josiah Kibira
- Presiding Bishop of the Evangelical Lutheran Church in Tanzania
- Church: Evangelical Lutheran Church in Tanzania
- Diocese: North-Western Diocese
- Elected: 1964
- In office: 1964–1974
- Predecessor: Bengt Sundkler

Orders
- Ordination: 1936 (priest)
- Consecration: 9 August 1964 by Bengt Sundkler

Personal details
- Born: August 1925 Kasyenye, Bukoba, Tanzania
- Died: 18 July 1988 (aged 62)
- Denomination: Evangelical-Lutheranism
- Parents: Isaya Kibira and Esteria Kibira
- Spouse: Martha Yeremiah
- Education: Boston University

Ordination history of Josiah Kibira
History
Priestly ordination
- Ordained by: Bruno Gutmann
Episcopal consecration
- Consecrated by: Bengt Sundkler

Josiah Mutabuzi Isaya Kibira was an Evangelical-Lutheran bishop of the North-Western Diocese the Evangelical Lutheran Church in Tanzania, later the president of the Lutheran World Federation from 1977 to 1984.

== Early life ==
Kibira was born in the Bukoba district, learning the Christian faith from his mother. He was baptized by Evangelical-Lutherans at a young age and received confirmation at fifteen. Helped by Bengt Sundkler, an Evangelical-Lutheran bishop from the Church of Sweden, he received an education at Boston University. Kibira later received an honorary doctorate from the University of Uppsala.

The eldest brother of Josiah Kibira was Emanuel Kibira, who served as the general secretary of the Bible Society of Tanzania.

== Episcopal ministry ==
Josiah Kibira was elected bishop of the Northwestern Diocese of the Evangelical Lutheran Church in Tanzania. He was consecrated by Bengt Sundkler, receiving the Swedish Line of apostolic succession.

In 1979, Josiah Kibira and Bengt Sundkler consecrated Paulo Mukuta a bishop, who served as the Bishop of Karagwe in the Evangelical Lutheran Church of Tanzania. In 1984, Paulo Mukuta and Tore Furberg consecrated Samson Mushemba, who served as Bishop of the North Western Diocese in the Evangelical Lutheran Church of Tanzania. In 2002, Samson Mushemba, as Archbishop of Arusha, and Olavi Rimpiläinen consecrated Walter Obare a bishop, who would eventually become the presiding bishop of the Evangelical Lutheran Church in Kenya.
