= Matti Väisänen (bishop) =

21st-century Finnish Lutheran bishop

Bishop Matti Väisänen
- Mission Province of Sweden and Finland
- Church: Mission Province of Sweden and Finland
- Installed: 20 March 2010
- Term ended: 4 May 2013

Orders
- Ordination: 1964
- Consecration: 2010, by Arne Olsson

Personal details
- Born: 24 February 1934 (age 92) Juva, Finland

Matti Kalevi Väisänen (born 24 February 1934, Juva) is a former priest of Evangelical Lutheran Church of Finland and the bishop of independent Luther Foundation ordained by Swedish-based Missionsprovinsen, an ecclesiastical province that opposes ordination of women. He graduated doctor of theology from University of Helsinki in 2007. In 2013 Väisänen ordained Risto Soramies as the first bishop of the Evangelical Lutheran Mission Diocese of Finland.

== Sources ==
- Luther Foundation bishop and ministers could be removed from established church
- Lutheran Church removes renegade bishop
