= Palais de Suède, Istanbul =

Historic building in Istanbul

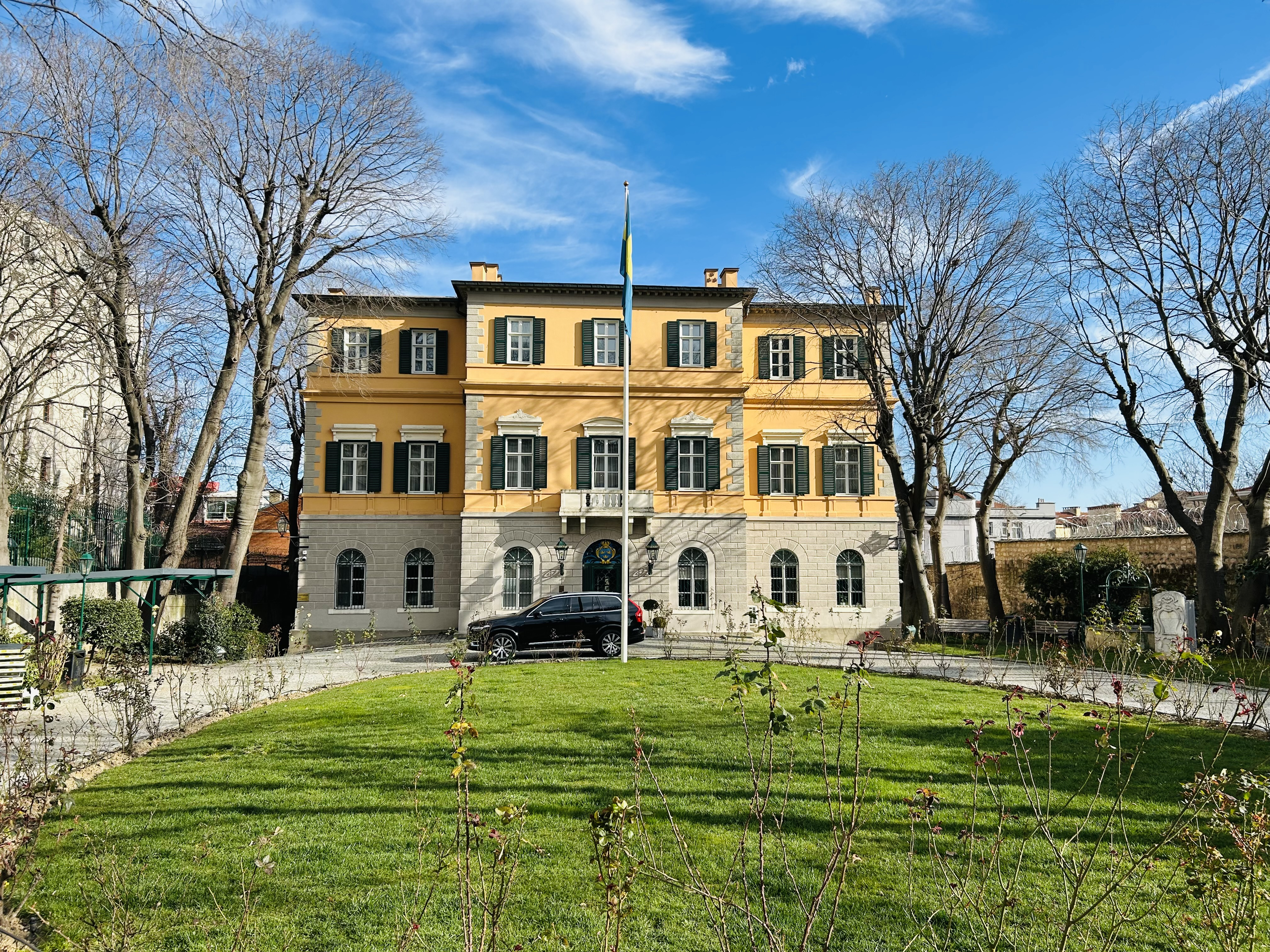
Palais de Suède, photographed in 2025

The Palais de Suède (lit. 'Palace of Sweden', Swedish: Svenska Palatset, Turkish: İsveç Sarayı) is a historic property facing İstiklal Avenue in the Beyoğlu (formerly Pera) neighborhood of Istanbul, Turkey. From 1757 to the 1920s, it has been the seat of diplomatic missions of the Kingdom of Sweden to the Ottoman Empire. Following the latter's abolition in 1922 and subsequent relocation of the Swedish embassy to the new capital of Ankara, the Palais de Suède has served as the Swedish consulate-general in Istanbul, as well as a residence for the ambassador when in town.

The building was originally built of wood and was altered repeatedly following episodes of fire and disrepair, and the current structure mostly results from reconstruction in 1869–1871. It was the first Swedish embassy building built on state-owned land abroad, and the oldest extant diplomatic mission of Sweden in the world.

== Name ==
The property has been mostly referred to by its French name Palais de Suède, even in Swedish- or English-language contexts, as French has long been used as common language in the international community of Istanbul.

== History ==
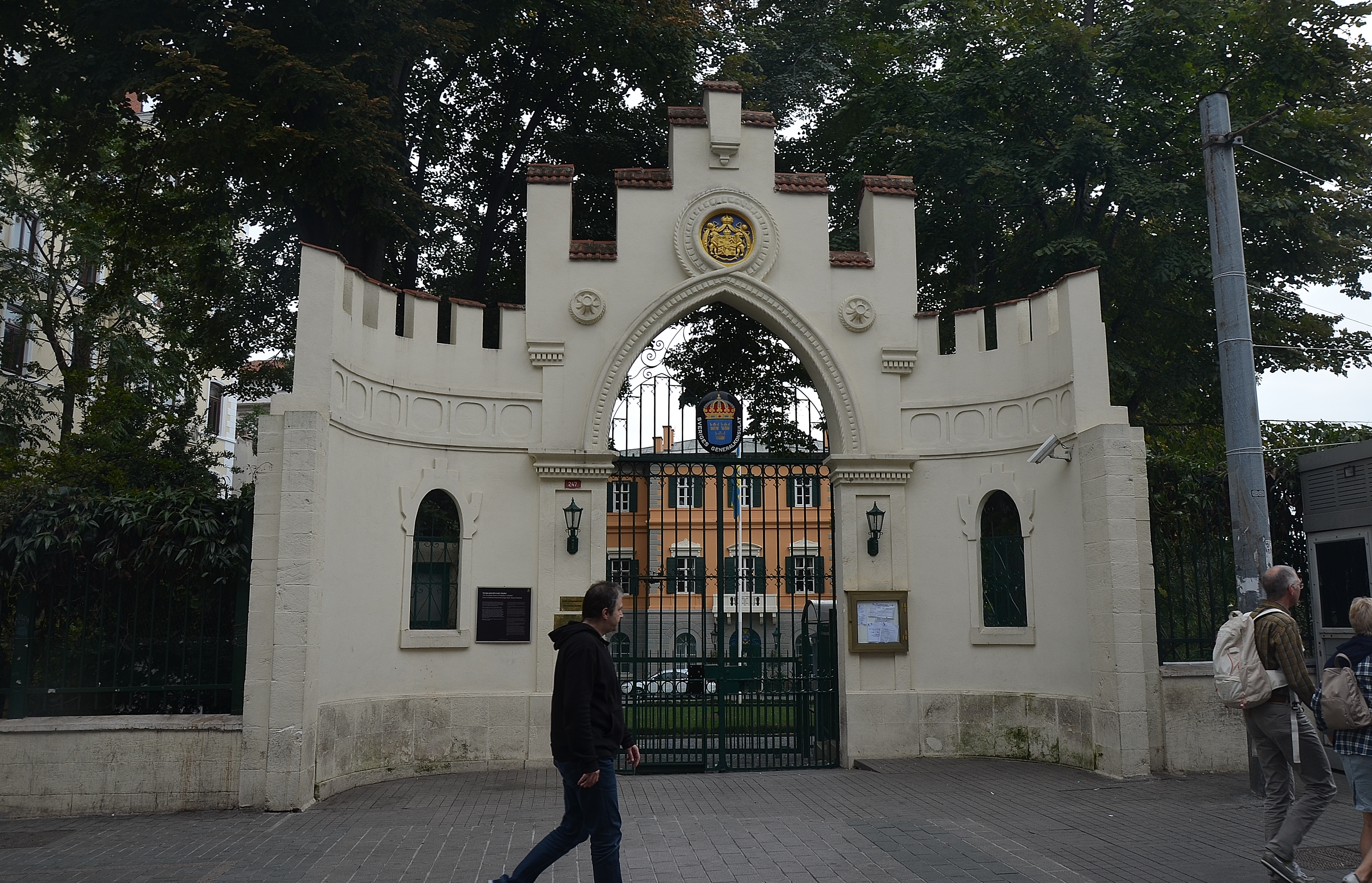
Gateway to the Palais de Suède on İstiklal Avenue

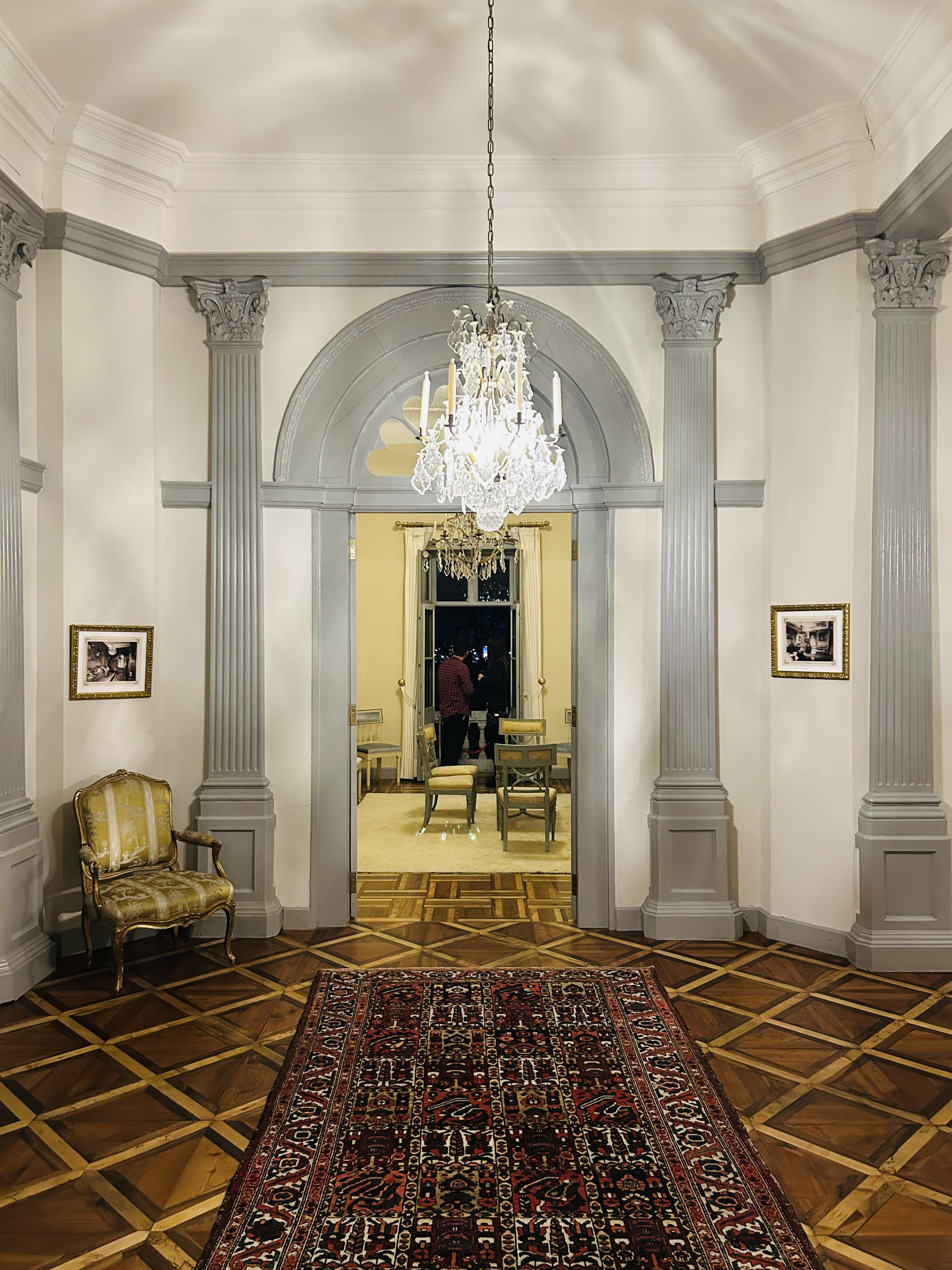
A room in the palace, 2025

Swedish King Charles XII resided in the Ottoman Empire from 1709 to 1714, the last year in Constantinople following the so-called skirmish at Bender. Sweden then established direct trade relations with the Empire in January 1737. Permanent diplomatic relations were established twenty years later, as diplomat Gustaf Celsing the Younger purchased what would become the Palais de Suède, by then a two-story Ottoman wooden house, on behalf of the Swedish state on 10 May 1757. The house had belonged to grand dragoman Alexander Ghica and was appropriated by the Ottoman state from the Ghica family following his execution in 1741. Its allocation to the Swedish envoy may have been intended as a signal to Sweden's rival the Russian Empire, which had its own diplomatic residence next door on the Pera High Street (now İstiklal Avenue).

A plot of land adjacent to the northern side of the site was purchased in 1787 and a kitchen building was built there, later referred to as the Dragoman House. The main building burned to the ground on Easter 1818, The Swedish legation then stayed in an existing kiosk on the property, whereas the Dragoman House was destroyed by fire in 1829 and rebuilt to become housing for priests, interpreters (dragomans) and others who worked at the legation.

The current main building was erected in 1869–1871 on a design by Austrian architect Domenico Pulgher. In 1885, the palace hosted King Oscar II and Queen Sophia on the occasion of their visit to Constantinople. The Dragoman House underwent extensive repairs the following year, when a floor was added with an open terrace on the new roof.

In 1927, the Swedish representation was formally transferred to Ankara, where the new embassy was completed in 1934. In 1953, the Palais de Suède formally became a consulate, and in 1962 was upgraded to consulate-general of Sweden in Istanbul.

In 1955, a roof was built on top of the Dragoman House's open terrace, which then became the third floor. The Swedish Research Institute in Istanbul (Svenska Forskningsinstitutet Istanbul, SFII), first established in 1962, moved into the Dragoman House in 1974. In the 1990s, the Dragoman House was rebuilt and reopened in 1999. In September 2010, another building, the new annex, was inaugurated just behind the Dragoman House, with eleven guest rooms, two meeting rooms, a kitchen and a shared patio. In 2011, earthquake protection was carried out on all buildings on the property.

== Chapel ==
For the purchase, Celsing used money that had been appropriated by the Riksdag for the construction of a Lutheran church, triggering some controversy at home; a small chapel was indeed erected in late 1757. It was destroyed by the Easter 1818 fire, and only rebuilt in 1859. A Lutheran priest officiated there until 1879; from 1883, the chapel was rented out to Greek Protestants. In 1999, the chapel was again used for Lutheran services, and in 2006 it became the seat of the Istanbul Lutheran Church.

== See also ==
- Eastern question
- List of ambassadors of Sweden to Turkey
- List of diplomatic missions of Sweden
