= Evangelical Lutheran Mission Diocese of Finland =

Church in Finland

Coordinates: 60.1639°N 24.9275°E

The Evangelical Lutheran Mission Diocese of Finland
- Orientation: High Church Lutheranism Lutheran
- Theology: Confessional Lutheran
- Leader: Bishop Juhana Pohjola
- Associations: International Lutheran Council
- Region: Finland
- Headquarters: Helsinki
- Origin: 16 March 2013
- Separated from: Evangelical Lutheran Church of Finland
- Congregations: 53 (2025)
- Members: 2,888 (end of 2025).
- Official website: www.lhpk.fi/en/

The Mission Diocese, officially the Evangelical Lutheran Mission Diocese of Finland, (Finnish: Suomen evankelisluterilainen lähetyshiippakunta, Swedish: Evangelisk-lutherska missionsstiftet i Finland) is an independent confessional Lutheran "ecclesial structure" in Finland. The Mission Diocese considers itself to be "part of ‘the one, holy, catholic and apostolic church’" to be "truly a church" and to act "fully independently as a church", although it has not applied for state-recognition as a registered religious community. The Mission Diocese has its origins in the conservative movements of the Evangelical Lutheran Church of Finland (ELCF) and it self-identifies as existing in the same continuum of Lutheran faith and congregational life of the ELCF whose spiritual heritage it cherishes, yet not being part of its administrative structures.

The Mission Diocese was founded in March 2013. Its first bishop, Risto Soramies, was consecrated on 4 May 2013.

The Evangelical Lutheran Mission Diocese of Finland shares altar and pulpit fellowship with those in the Communion of Nordic Lutheran Dioceses, in addition to being a member of the International Lutheran Council. Since 2024, they have also established altar and pulpit fellowship with the Union of Independent Evangelical Lutheran Congregations in Finland. The ELMDF has also been influential in the establishment of the Istanbul Lutheran Church.

In 2025, the ELMDF had 92,000 total visitors and 2888 full members, representing a growth of 140 members in one year.

== Background ==
The Mission Diocese was founded by the 22 congregations of the Luther Foundation Finland and three other Lutheran congregations in 2013. The Luther Foundation had been established in 1999, starting to celebrate the Divine Service on one location in Helsinki in 2000. By 2004, the Luther Foundation had become a supporting member of the Swedish Mission Province. Bishop Matti Väisänen had been consecrated in 2010 in order to serve the congregations in Finland, which soon led to his being defrocked by the ELCF whose pastor he was. In 2012, the ELCF archbishop expressed his wish that the Luther Foundation establish its own church body. The founding of the Ev. Luth. Mission Diocese of Finland in 2013 marked independence from the Mission Province of Sweden, although contacts remained close. The ELCF continued to defrock its pastors now serving in the Mission Diocese: Bishop Risto Soramies was defrocked on 9 October 2013 and Dean Juhana Pohjola on 5 August 2014. On 8 April 2015, the Cathedral Chapter of the ELCF Archdiocese of Turku defrocked five ELCF pastors for breaking their ordination vows by serving in the Mission Diocese that the ELCF viewed a de facto different church body.

The Mission Diocese was founded in response to the perceived secularisation and liberalisation of the Evangelical Lutheran Church of Finland and "to spread, maintain and renovate the true faith, to revive and strengthen Christian life and to implement Christian charity and diaconia" in Finland. According to the Mission Diocese, the ELCF had in many ways distanced itself from its doctrinal foundation, the Bible and the Lutheran Book of Concord. The Mission Diocese continues to serve those left "spiritually homeless" by the theological reforms in the ELCF. These comprise e.g. the acceptance of the ordination of women (1986), the exclusion of such men from ordination who will not co-operate liturgically with women pastors (2006) and the acceptance of same-sex relationships (2011). The Mission Diocese also reaches out to the unchurched and views the founding of Lutheran congregations as its principle in both domestic and foreign mission.

By the end of 2024, the number of Mission Diocese congregations has grown to 50 congregations and 4 missions.

== Doctrine ==
The Mission Diocese holds that "all teaching, practice and life should be tested, executed and guided by the word of God." The Mission Diocese recognizes the Book of Concord as an accurate teaching of biblical doctrine.

== Congregations ==
As of 2025 the Mission Diocese has 44 organised congregations. In addition to this, Mass is celebrated on six other locations. Each congregation is part of one of the seven districts.

District of Tavastia

- Hämeenlinna: Matteuksen seurakunta
- Jyväskylä: Jesajan luterilainen seurakunta
- Lahti: Samuelin luterilainen seurakunta
- Tampere: Johanneksen seurakunta
- Kangasala: Johanneksen seurakunta

District of Ostrobothnia

- Jakobstad: Sankt Jakobs församling (Swedish)
- Kokkola: Andreaksen luterilainen seurakunta
- Oulainen: Simeonin seurakunta
- Seinäjoki: Luukkaan seurakunta
- Pyhänkoski: Pyhän Ristin luterilainen seurakunta
- Vaasa: Mikaelin seurakunta
- Vaasa: Sankt Immanuels lutherska församling (Swedish)

District of Uusimaa

- Espoo: Pyhän Tuomaksen seurakunta
- Helsinki: Pyhän Markuksen luterilainen seurakunta
- Helsinki: Koinonian luterilainen seurakunta
- Lohja: Pyhän Ristin luterilainen seurakunta
- Porvoo: Hyvän Paimenen luterilainen seurakunta
- Vantaa: Pyhän Kolminaisuuden luterilainen seurakunta

Eastern district

- Iisalmi: Danielin luterilainen seurakunta
- Joensuu: Pyhän Nehemian luterilainen seurakunta
  - Lieksa:
  - Nurmes
- Jyväskylä: Jesajan luterilainen seurakunta
  - Saarijärvi:
- Mikkeli: Tiituksen luterilainen seurakunta
- Pieksämäki: Pyhä Luukkaan luterilainen seurakunta
- Savonlinna: Pyhän Jaakobin luterilainen seurakunta
- Kuopio: Pyhän Pietarin luterilainen seurakunta
  - Riistavesi: Riistaveden kappeli srk

Northern district

- Kajaani: Filippuksen seurakunta
- Raahe: Pietarin luterilainen seurakunta
- Oulu: Timoteuksen seurakunta
- Meri-Lappi: Vapahtajan luterilainen seurakunta
- Rovaniemi: Stefanoksen seurakunta
  - Kemijärvi:
- Sodankylä: Elian seurakunta
- Utsjoki: Joosefin luterilainen seurakunta

Southeastern district

- Imatra: Joosuan seurakunta
- Kotka: Luterilainen Siilas seurakunta
- Kouvola: Pauluksen seurakunta
- Lappeenranta: Joonan seurakunta
- Parikkala: Pyhän Ristin luterilainen seurakunta

Southwestern district

- Laitila: Aamoksen seurakunta
- Loimaa: Hyvän Paimenen luterilainen seurakunta
- Forssa: Pyhän Sanan luterilainen seurakunta
- Pori: Sakkeuksen seurakunta
- Kankaanpää: Pyhän Simeonin luterilainen seurakunta
- Rauma: Pyhän Marian seurakunta
- Salo: Apostoli Johanneksen luterilainen seurakunta
- Turku: Pyhän Paavalin luterilainen seurakunta
- Åbo: Sankt Gabriels församling (Swedish)

== International Contacts ==
In December 2014, Bishop Soramies consecrated Robert Kaumba as Bishop of the Lutheran Evangelical Church in Africa—Zambia Diocese. The Lutheran Heritage Foundation and Lutherans in Africa are the Mission Diocese's partners in foreign mission.

The Mission Diocese declared altar and pulpit fellowship with the Mission Province of Sweden and the Evangelical Lutheran Diocese of Norway in 2015 and with Lutheran Church—Canada in 2017.

The Mission Diocese has also begun fellowship talks with the Evangelical Lutheran Church of England, the Independent Evangelical Lutheran Church in Germany, and The Union of Independent Evangelical Lutheran Congregations in Finland. It is also applying for membership in the International Lutheran Council.
