= Apostolic History Network =

The Apostolic History Network is an interdenominational and independent organization researching Apostolic church history; the Apostolic History Network is a registered charity under the name of Netzwerk Apostolische Geschichte e.V. at the court of Bielefeld, Germany.

The Network hosts an archive building in Brockhagen with a library and reading room.

== Literature ==
Proceedings, directly from the network Apostolic History

- Die apostolischen Gemeinden im Umbruch – 1863 bis 1900. Nürtingen 2008, ISBN 978-3-939291-03-9
- Aufbau, Ausbau, Trennungen. Die Entwicklung der apostolischen Gemeinschaften im ersten Drittel des 20. Jahrhunderts. Nürtingen 2009, ISBN 978-3-939291-04-6
- Kirche auf dem Weg – die apostolischen Gemeinschaften im Verlauf des 20. Jahrhunderts. Bielefeld 2010, ISBN 978-3-939291-06-0
- Frankfurt im Spiegel der Geschichte der Apostolischen Gemeinschaften. Steinhagen 2013, ISBN 978-3-939291-07-7

The selection of literature or works of members of the network Apostolic History

- Wissen, Volker: Zur Freiheit berufen – Ein Porträt der Vereinigung Apostolischer Gemeinden und ihrer Gliedkirchen, Remscheid 2008, ISBN 978-3-86870-030-5
- Diersmann, Edwin: An ihren Früchten sollt ihr sie erkennen – Das Erbe von F.W. Schwarz, ReDi-Roma Verlag, 10.2007, ISBN 978-3-940450-20-3
- Eberle, Mathias: Die Liturgie. – Andachtsbuch zum Gebrauch bei allen Gottesdiensten der christlichen Kirche. Hamburg, 1864. Kommentierte Neuausgabe mit den Änderungen der zweiten Auflage von 1894., Nürtingen 2008, Edition Punctum Saliens Verlag
- Wissen, Volker: Theologische Entwicklungen der Vereinigung Apostolischer Gemeinden (VAG) von 1956 bis heute., Remscheid 2009, ISBN 978-3-940450-19-7
- Diersmann, Edwin: Die Kirchenspaltung in der HAZEA Edition Punctum Saliens Verlag, Bielefeld 2011, ISBN 978-3-939291-05-3
- Fadire, Peter: Das Werk des Herrn ReDi-Roma Verlag, 2011, ISBN 978-3-86870-308-5
