= The Union of Independent Evangelical Lutheran Congregations in Finland =

The Union of Independent Evangelical Lutheran Congregations in Finland (Finnish: Suomen evankelisluterilainen seurakuntaliitto (or simply as Seurakuntaliitto, Union of Congregations), Swedish: Evangelisk-lutherska församlingsförbundet i Finland) is an independent Evangelical Lutheran church body in Finland. It is registered as religious community in 23 August 1928. It is an association or a synod of free and independent Evangelical Lutheran local congregations. It emphasizes the freedom of congregations to run its own affairs. Five local congregations join in as the Union of Congregations. The member congregations are located in Helsinki, Karstula, Tampere, Marttila and Veteli and they have also activities in other parts of Finland. The Union of Congregations had 482 members in 2016.

== Doctrine ==
The Union of Congregations and each of its member congregations confess the Holy Bible from each part as firm Word of God which is written by inspiration of Holy Spirit and confess it as only fully valid norm of faith and life. The Union of Congregations and each of its local congregations avows themselves also to the doctrine of the Symbolical Books of the Evangelical Lutheran Church, because it is taken from Holy Bible which is the highest authority in all matters of Christian faith and doctrine.

== Brief history ==
The origin of the Union of Congregations is the dispute in the Lutheran Evangelical revival movement (which movement was founded by Fredrik Gabriel Hedberg) on 1920s, is the Evangelical Lutheran Church of Finland enough committed to the Lutheran Confessions. It actualized when the new law on the freedom of religion in 1923 made it possible to resign the National Church and to form own religious community. Majority of the Lutheran Evangelical revival movement remained within the National Church. Beyond the foundation of the Union of Congregations was also necessity to go apart from unbiblical teaching. The inspiration for founding own free churches came from among other things Confessional Lutheran free churches of German and the Lutheran Church–Missouri Synod. The first Evangelical Lutheran free congregation was founded in 1923 in Luopioinen. Later congregations in Lahti, Hämeenlinna, Tampere, Veteli and Marttila were founded. The leaders had dispute on the doctrine of the atonement in 1924 and it caused that these free Lutheran congregations were divided into two Lutheran church bodies. The Union of Congregations is the bigger one. The other one is Suomen tunnustuksellinen luterilainen kirkko (official English name is the Confessional Lutheran Church of Finland).

== Activities and publications ==
The congregations are cooperating as a union of congregations in publishing ministry and camp activities. In addition to Divine services youths' gatherings, Children's clubs, gatherings at homes (Bible Study Groups and Singing) are own activities of local congregations. The Union of Congregations has camp and training center Kukkian Keidas in Luopioinen at Kuohijoki. The Union of Congregations has published books and own translation of New testament and Psalms which is adopted in 1935 (Psalms in 1949) and translation is linguistically revised in 1983. The Union of Congregations publishes a periodical Seurakuntalainen and its circulation is 450. The Pastors of the Union of Congregations has the right to perform wedding ceremonies.
