= Bengt Sundkler =

The Most Reverend Bengt Sundkler
- Bishop of Bukoba
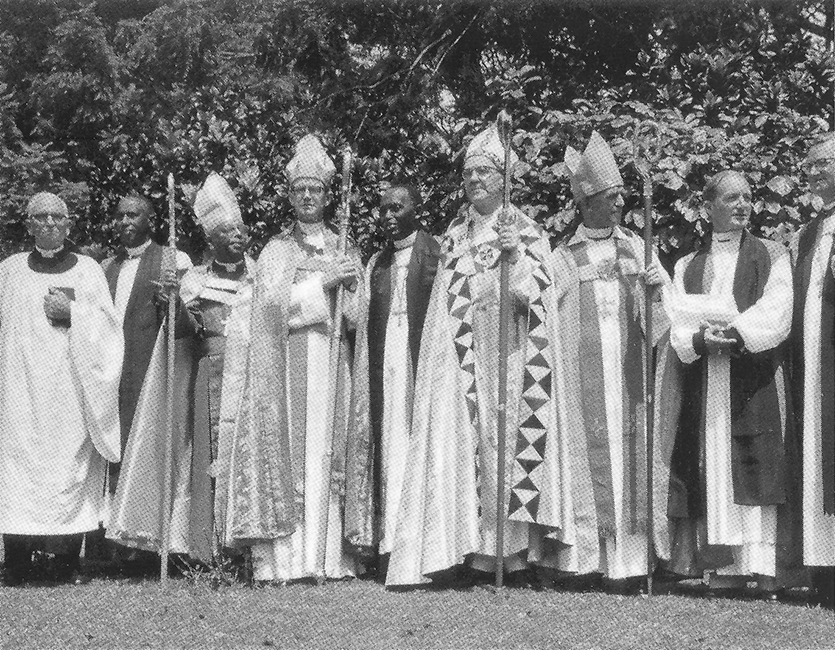
- Church: Church of Sweden; Evangelical Lutheran Church of Buhaya
- Diocese: Bukoba
- Elected: 1960
- In office: 1961–1964
- Predecessor: Gunnar Hultgren
- Successor: Josiah Kibira

Orders
- Ordination: 1936 (priest)
- Consecration: 2 April 1961 by Gunnar Hultgren

Personal details
- Born: Lars Olof Jonathan Söderblom; May 7, 1909 Degerfors, Västerbotten, Sweden
- Died: April 5, 1995 (aged 85) Uppsala, Sweden
- Denomination: Evangelical-Lutheranism
- Parents: Gustaf Fredrik Johansson Sundkler and Lilly Bergman
- Spouse: Ingeborg Morén (1907–1993)
- Children: Gunnar Sundkler
- Education: Uppsala University

Ordination history of Bengt Sundkler
History
Priestly ordination
- Ordained by: Erik Berggrav
Episcopal consecration
- Consecrated by: Gunnar Hultgren

Bengt G. M. Sundkler (May 7, 1908, in Degerfors, Västerbotten, Sweden – April 5, 1995, in Uppsala, Sweden) was a Swedish-Tanzanian and Evangelical-Lutheran Church historian, missiologist, professor and Bishop of Bukoba.

Bengt Sundkler was ordained a priest by Erik Berggrav in 1936 and then consecrated as a bishop in the Church of Sweden by Gunnar Hultgren at Uppsala Cathedral on 2 April 1961. He was elected as the Bishop of Bukoba in the Evangelical Lutheran Church of Buhaya in June 1960. Bengt Sundkler, on 16 December 1984, consecrated Josiah Kibira as bishop at Bukoba Evangelical-Lutheran Cathedral and Josiah Kibira reigned as the bishop of the North-Western Diocese of the Evangelical Lutheran Church in Tanzania (ELCT) until 2000, later becoming the president of the Lutheran World Federation. It is through the consecration of Josiah Kibira by Bengt G. M. Sundkler that apostolic succession from the Church of Sweden (in the line of Peder Månsson) was transmitted to what is now the Evangelical Lutheran Church in Tanzania.

== Biography ==
Sundkler was the son of Gustaf Sundkler, a merchant, and Lilly Bergman. His father was the son of Carl Gustaf Sinclair (1849-1919), the last member of the Swedish Counts dynasty Sinclair. After studying at the universities of Uppsala, Strasbourg and Paris, Bengt Sundkler became doctor of divinity (teol.dr)1937 with a thesis on the breakthrough of missionary thinking in Sweden by the Swedish Lutheran Mission 1835-75. Earlier, he had already in 1933 published the book How old is the sacrament of infant baptism and in Paris in 1937 published study Contributions a l'étude de la pensée missionaire dans le Nouveau Testament. He was then working as a Church of Sweden missionary in Tanganyika 1937-42 and as the superintendent of the Lutheran Haya Church there 1942-45 He then returned to Sweden and was appointed associate professor of missiology at Uppsala University in 1945 and was the 1942-45 research secretary of the International Missionary Council in London. Between 1949-74 he was chair professor of Church History and history of Christian missions at Uppsala University. When the Haya Church 1961 introduced the episcopate, he was called back there as the first holder and was Bishop of Bukoba in Tanzania 1961-64.

1961-65, Sundkler was a member of the World Council of Churches Central Committee and delegate of the Haya Church at the WCC World Synod in Uppsala in 1968. In 1959-61, he was vice president of the International Missionary Council. He was an honorary doctorate in theology at the universities of Aberdeen, Tübingen, Oslo and Helsinki.

== Missiologist and Church historian ==
Sundkler was an acknowledged position as a researcher in ecumenism and mission work, and was a well known scholar of African church history. He wrote several books on the subject, including Bantu Prophets in South Africa in 1948, which was translated into several languages. As ecumenist he documented Church of South India from 1900 to 1947, a cross denominational church merger in India. The book Christian Ministry in Africa were published in 1960. As a university teacher in Sweden he published Missionens värld in 1963 and a Swedish missionary atlas 1957. He wrote of the Swedish Tanzania Mission's history in the books Young Church in Tanganyika (1948) ‘Bara Bukoba’’ 1974. His most comprehensive work is the 1200-page African church history A History of the Church in Africa, published posthumously in 2000.

Sundkler published several works on the subject of Nathan Söderblom, including in 1968 the biography Nathan Soderblom his Life and Work. Following his death, scholars discovered that much of his best-known work contained extensive plagiarism of black African writers, including his own researcher Regina Twala. Twala died having never received full credit for her academic work.

== Bibliography ==
A bibliography Sundkler's publications is included in Sigbert Axelson's book, The Church Crossing Frontiers. Essays on the Nature of Mission in Honour of Bengt Sundkler.
