= Walter Obare =

Lutheran Bishop

The Most Reverend Walter Obare
- Archbishop Emeritus of Nairobi; Presiding Bishop Emeritus of ELCK
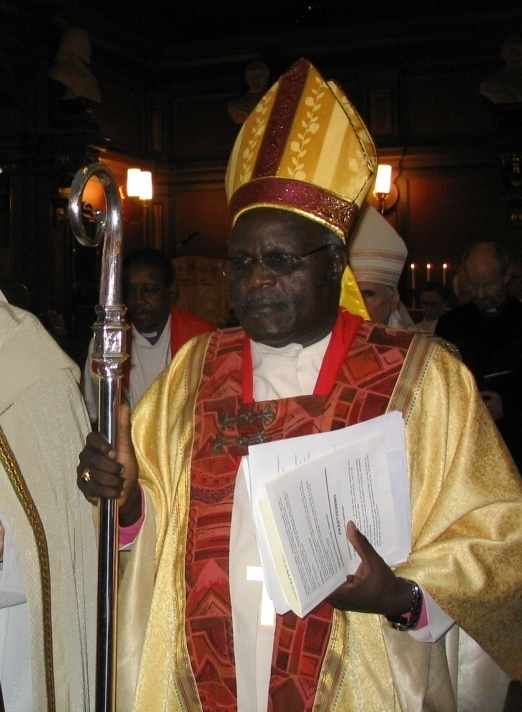
- Church: Evangelical Lutheran Church in Kenya
- Archdiocese: Nairobi
- Appointed: 2002
- In office: 2002–2019
- Predecessor: Francis Nyamwaro Onderi
- Successor: Joseph Ochola Omolo

Orders
- Ordination: 1982
- Consecration: 24 November 2002 by Samson Mushemba

Personal details
- Born: 10 May 1947 (age 79) Misambi, Nyamira County, Kenya

Walter Obare Omwanza is the former presiding bishop (in apostolic succession) of the Evangelical Lutheran Church in Kenya (ELCK), which is a member of the Lutheran World Federation and the International Lutheran Council.

Concordia Theological Seminary in Fort Wayne, Indiana, a seminary of the U.S. Lutheran Church–Missouri Synod (LCMS), awarded Obare an honorary Doctor of Divinity (Honoris Causa) degree in 2006.

== Childhood and family life ==
Obare was born in Misambi village on 10 May 1947 in the Nyamira District of Kenya. He married in 1976 and has ten children and seven grandchildren.

== Schooling and service ==
Obare studied at Matongo Lutheran Theological College (MLTC) and graduated with a General Certificate in Theology in 1981.

He was ordained as a pastor in 1982, after which he served as a parish pastor in nine congregations simultaneously. In 1985, he was appointed by the ELCK to be Pastor for Schools, a churchwide position. In 1991, he again studied at MLTC, graduating with a Higher Diploma in Theology in 1993. In the same year he began a teaching career at MLTC.

He was awarded a master's degree from the LCMS's Concordia Seminary in St Louis, Missouri. He came back to Kenya and continued at MLTC until August 2002, when he was called to the office of the Presiding Bishop of ELCK. He was consecrated a bishop on 24 November 2002 by bishop Samson Mushemba, the presiding bishop of the ELCT, assisted by bishop Francis Nyamwaro Onderi who is ordained by Gunnar Weman archbishop of Uppsala.

== Apostolic succession ==
Walter Obare was ordained bishop on 24 November 2002 by:

Samson Mushemba, the presiding bishop of the ELCT, who was ordained in 1984 by :

Paulo Mukuta, bishop of Karagwe, who was ordained in 1979 by :

Josias Kibira, assistant bishop of Bukoba, who was ordained bishop by :

Bengt Sundkler, the first Lutheran bishop in Tanzania, who was ordained bishop by :

Bo Giertz, bishop of Gothenburg (Church of Sweden)

== Mission Province and Lutheran World Federation ==
On 5 February 2005, he consecrated a Swedish pastor, Arne Olsson, as bishop for a conservative group called Missionsprovinsen, which opposes the Church of Sweden's policy on placing women and unrepentant homosexuals into the ordained pastorate. The Council of the Lutheran World Federation subsequently terminated a leadership position Obare held within the LWF on 1 September 2005.
