= Lutheran Evangelical Church in Africa—Zambia Diocese =

Lutheran Evangelical Church in Africa—Zambia Diocese (LECA) is a Lutheran church body in Zambia that co-operates with for example the Lutheran Evangelical Association of Finland. In December 2014 Robert Kaumba was installed as bishop for the diocese by the bishop of the Evangelical Lutheran Mission Diocese of Finland, Risto Soramies.
