= Riistavesi =

Lake in Finland

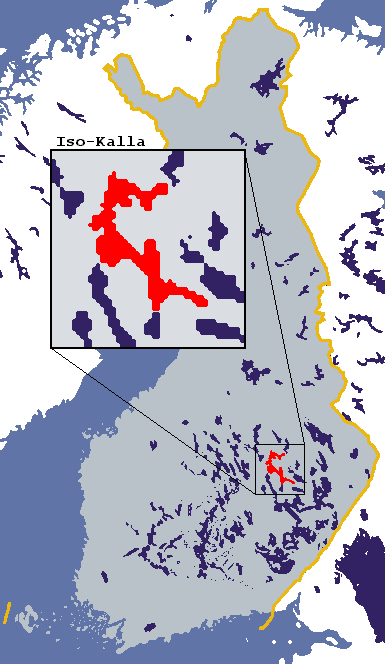
- Location of iso-Kalla, which includes lakes Riistavesi, Kallavesi, Suvasvesi Muuruvesi.

- Location within Finland
- Coordinates: 62.8752°N 28.122°E
- Catchment area: Vuoksi
- Basin countries: Finland
- Surface area: 23.172 km^{2} (8.947 sq mi)
- Average depth: 6.65 m (21.8 ft)
- Max. depth: 42.97 m (141.0 ft)
- Water volume: 0.154 km^{3} (125,000 acre⋅ft)
- Shore length^{1}: 197.82 km (122.92 mi)
- Surface elevation: 81.9 m (269 ft)
- Frozen: December–April
- Islands: Kipansalo, Riistasaari, Kumpusaari
- ^{1} Shore length is not a well-defined measure.

Riistavesi is a medium-sized lake in the Vuoksi main catchment area. It is located in the Northern Savonia region in Finland, close to the town of Kuopio.

== See also ==
- List of lakes in Finland
