= Richard Joseph Cooke =

American Methodist bishop and author (d. 1931)

Richard Joseph Cooke (1853—1931) was a US Methodist clergyman who served as bishop of the Methodist Episcopal Church, South, elected in 1912. He also distinguished himself as a pastor, an editor, a theologian, an author, and a university administrator.

== Early life ==
Richard was born January 31, 1853, in New York, the son of Richard and Joana (née Geary) Cooke. He came South at an early age, working as a timekeeper for a railroad construction company for a time.

Richard married Eliza Gettys Fisher April 20, 1881. They had four children. She died in 1904. Then he married Ella B. Fisher in 1908 (his first wife's sister).

== Education ==
Richard graduated in 1880 from East Tennessee Wesleyan University. He afterwards studied at the University of Berlin, Germany. The University of Tennessee awarded him the honorary degree D.D. Likewise, Willamette University awarded the LL.D.

== Ordained ministry ==
Richard was admitted to the Central Tennessee Annual Conference of the M.E. Church, South in 1873. He also served as a pastor in the Holston Conference, where he served the Cleveland, Tennessee church, and First Methodist of Knoxville. He also taught at both Athens University and Chattanooga University. Later he was also the editor of the Methodist Advocate Journal.

== Death and burial ==
A break in his health led to his retirement in 1920. Yet his influence continued to be felt throughout Methodism. He died Christmas Day, December 25, 1931. He was buried at Athens, Tennessee.

== Works ==
- Reasons for Church Creed : A contribution to present-day controversies, 1888.
- Christianity and Childhood : or, The relation of children to the church, 1891.
- The Historic Episcopate : a study of Anglican claims and Methodist orders, 1896.
- History of the Ritual of the Methodist Episcopal Church, with a commentary on its offices, 1900.
- Freedom of Thought in Religious Teaching, 1913.
- The Church and World Peace, 1920.
- Religion in Russia under the Soviets, 1924.

== See also ==
- List of bishops of the United Methodist Church
