= Missionsprovinsen =

Evangelical Lutheran church

The Mission Province
- Missionsprovinsen
- Seal of the Mission Province of Sweden
- Classification: Protestant
- Orientation: High Church Lutheranism
- Theology: Confessional Lutheran
- Polity: Episcopal
- Primate: Bishop Bengt Ådahl
- Associations: International Lutheran Council
- Region: Sweden
- Headquarters: Gothenburg, Sweden
- Separated from: Church of Sweden
- Congregations: 23
- Official website: missionsprovinsen.se

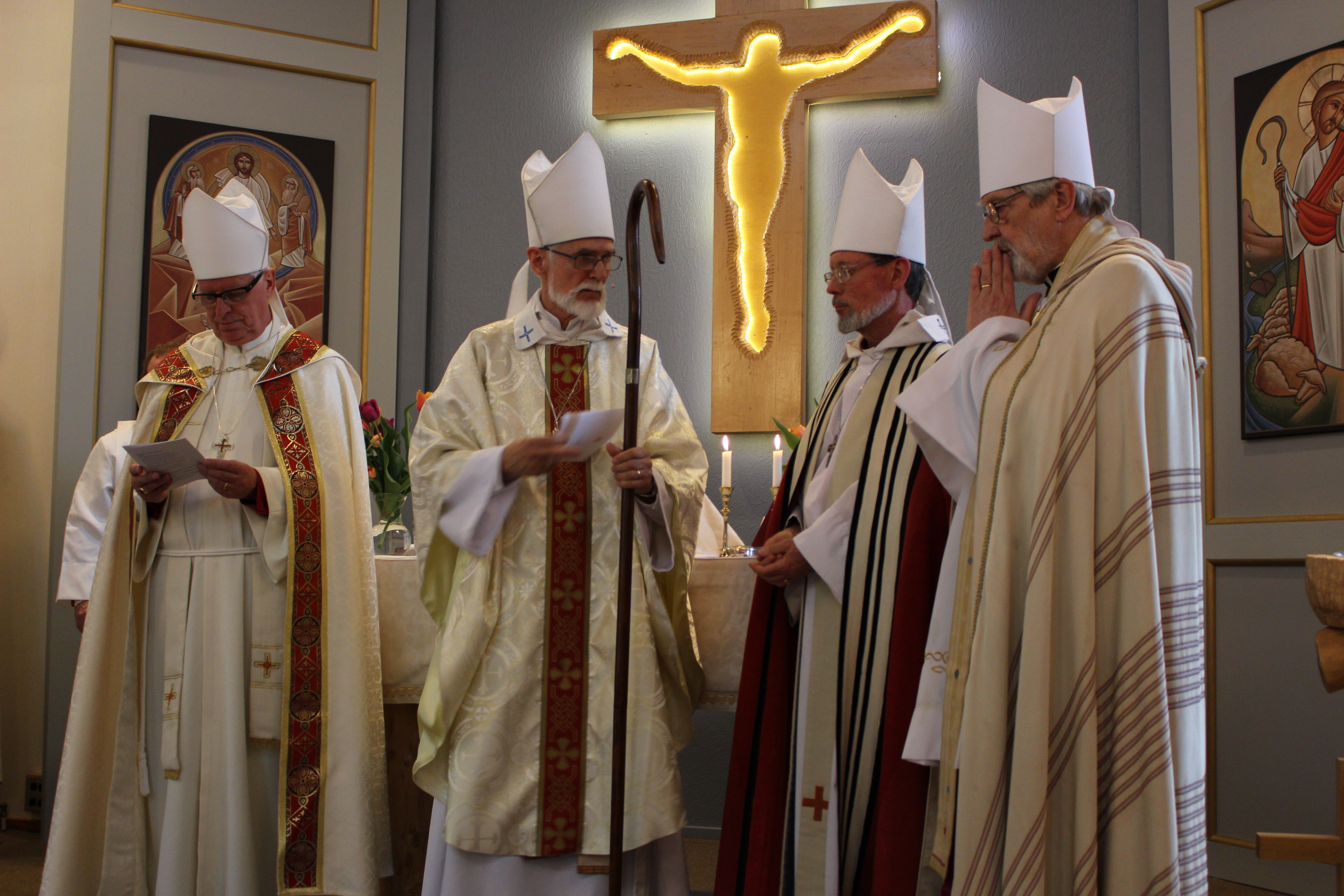
Bishops of the Mission Province

The Mission Province (Swedish: Missionsprovinsen [mɪˈɧûːnsprʊˌvɪnːsɛn]) is a Swedish independent ecclesiastical province founded by members of the Church of Sweden who are opposed to the ordination of women to the priesthood and episcopate. The province, which aligns with Confessional Lutheranism, considers itself as a free-standing diocese within the Church of Sweden, a position rejected by the church itself. The Mission Province was founded on 6 September 2003 and shares altar and pulpit fellowship with those in the Communion of Nordic Lutheran Dioceses, in addition to being a member of the International Lutheran Council.

== History ==
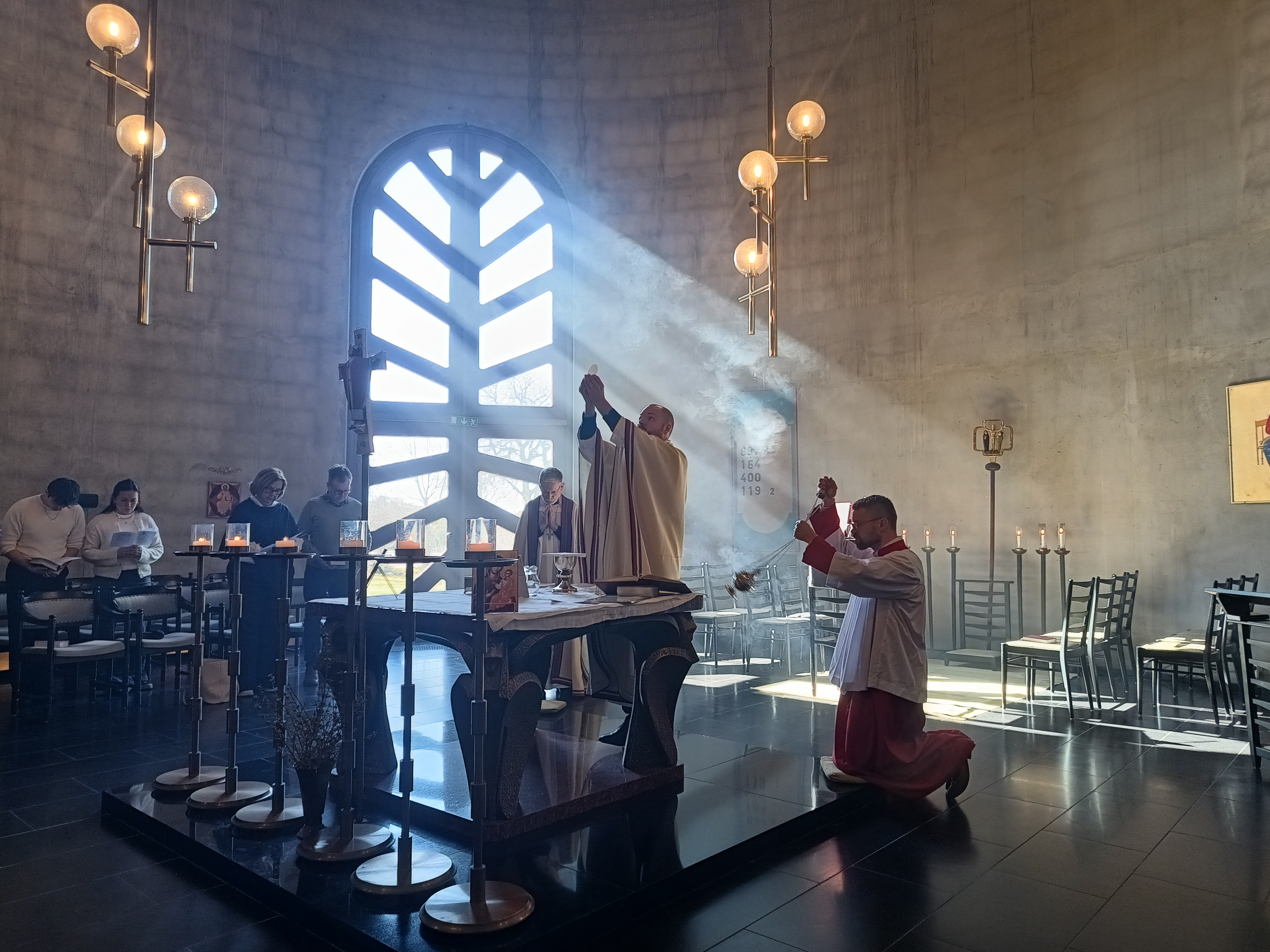
Elevation during the Holy Mass, offered in the Chapel of Heavenly Joy (Evangelical-Lutheran) in Kristianstad; the Chapel of Heavenly Joy (Himmelska glädjens kapell) is a part of the Mission Province.

The Province was founded as an alternative ecclesiastical jurisdiction in order to support the establishment of new free Eucharistic communities (koinonias). It contains the Catholic, Schartauan, Confessional and Evangelical expressions found in the Church of Sweden on the doctrinal basis of the Book of Concord. On 5 February 2005, The Most Reverend Walter Obare, presiding bishop of the Evangelical Lutheran Church in Kenya, assisted by bishops Leonid Zviki from Belarus, David Tswaedi from South Africa, Børre Knudsen and Ulf Asp from Norway, consecrated Arne Olsson in apostolic succession as the Ordinary for the Mission Province.

In April 2006, Arne Olsson consecrated pastors Lars Artman and Göran Beijer as assistant bishops for the Mission Province. The alternative hierarchy of the Mission province ordains candidates for the priesthood who are not in favour of the ordination of women and who are therefore not accepted for ordination in the national Churches of Sweden or Finland. In Sweden there are 25 to 30 congregations led by Mission Province priests, in addition to 30 to 35 congregations in Finland.

Though the Mission Province holds itself to be a non-territorial diocese within the Church of Sweden, bishops of the Church of Sweden do not acknowledge the Mission Province as a part of the Church of Sweden and Bishop Arne Olsson was defrocked by the state church soon after his episcopal ordination in the Missionsprovinsen, as were Lars Artman and Göran Beijer.

Since 2015 the Mission Province has been in fellowship with the Evangelical Lutheran Mission Diocese of Finland and the Evangelical Lutheran Diocese of Norway. The Mission Province is also, as of 2018, a member of the International Lutheran Council.

== Religious orders, monasteries and convents ==
- Sisters of the Holy Spirit at Alsike Convent

The church has about 20 congregatiouns in Sweden.https://ilcouncil.org/members/europe/sweden/ The Missions province also supports a hebrew-speaking congregation in Tel Aviv together with the Lutheran Church - Missouri Synod and the Mission Diocses of Finland. https://www.lhpk.fi/en/lutheran-congregation-in-tel-aviv-receives-its-own-pastor/

== See also ==
- Evangelical Lutheran Mission Diocese of Finland
- Matti Väisänen (bishop)
- Nordic Catholic Church
- Continuing Anglican movement
