= Bulgarian Orthodox Church – Alternative synod =

Former Eastern Orthodox schism

Bulgarian Orthodox Church - Alternative synod Българска православна църква - Алтернативен синод
- Classification: Eastern Orthodoxy
- Governance: Episcopal
- Leader: Pimen Enev (1992-1999); Innocent Petrov (1999-2012)
- Language: Bulgarian and Old Church Slavic
- Territory: Bulgaria
- Independence: 1992
- Reunion: 2010-2015
- Separated from: Bulgarian Orthodox Church

The Bulgarian Orthodox Church – Alternative synod was an Eastern Orthodox Church that claimed to be the sole legitimate Eastern Orthodox church in Bulgaria. It existed between 1992 and 2015.

== History ==
In 1991 the new Bulgarian government created a Board of Religious Affairs that began to initiate reforms in the country’s religious institutions. In March 1992 it ruled that the 1971 election of Bulgarian Patriarch Maxim had been recognized illegal because he had been appointed by the communist government in an uncanonical manner. This triggered a division among the bishops, and several of them under the leadership of Metropolitan Pimen (Enev) of Nevrokop called publicly for Maxim’s deposition, forming the Alternative synod. They were condemned as schismatics by the official Holy Synod of the Bulgarian Orthodox Church. The dispute hardened into an even deeper division when, on July 4, 1996, Metropolitan Pimen was installed as rival Patriarch and was anathematized by Maxim’s Holy Synod.

In 1998, through mediation of several Eastern Orthodox churches, an agreement to heal the schism was reached, but soon it turned out that effort for reconciliation were short-lived.

A synod was held in 2008 for the election of the new head of the church, and Metropolitan Inokentii was elected as the leading hierarch. In 2010, Metropolitan Inokentii called for a healing of division between the churches.

Patriarch Neophyte of Bulgaria, elected official Patriarch on 24 February 2013, has been recognised as being influential and for his perseverance in ending the schism. The schism ended in 2015.
