= Evangelical Lutheran Diocese of Norway =

Lutheran diocese in Norway

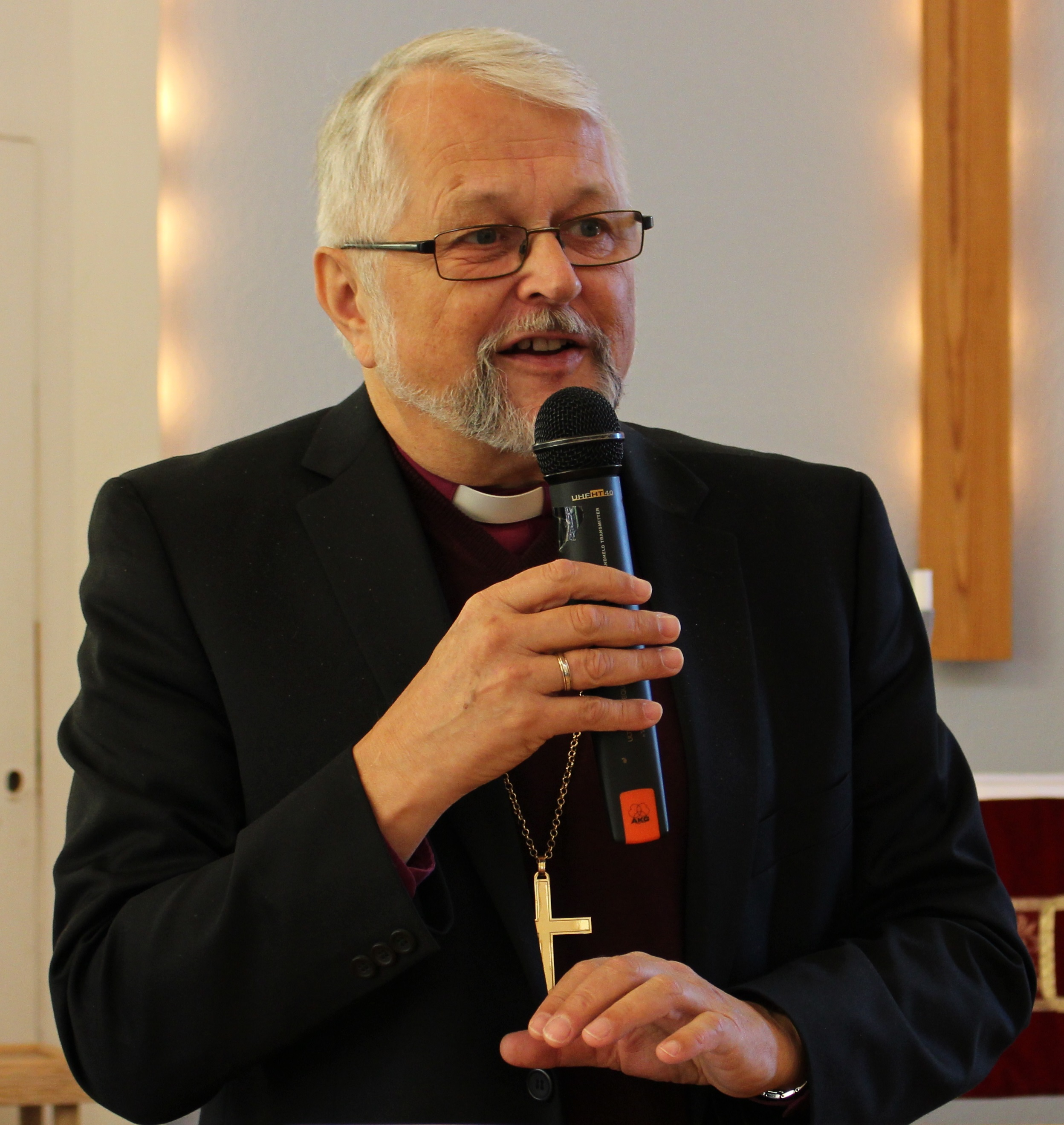
Thor Henrik With in 2016

Evangelical Lutheran Diocese of Norway (Norwegian: Det evangelisk-lutherske stift i Norge) is a Lutheran diocese in Norway, founded in Kautokeino in 2013. Branched out from the "Church of Norway in Exile" (formerly the Deanery of Strandebarm), the bishop of the diocese is Thor Henrik With.

The diocese co-operates with the Mission Province of Sweden and the Evangelical Lutheran Mission Diocese of Finland through the Communion of Nordic Lutheran Dioceses. The three dioceses have altar and pulpit fellowship.
