= Risto Soramies =

21st-century Finnish Lutheran bishop

Bishop Risto Soramies
- Evangelical Lutheran Mission Diocese of Finland
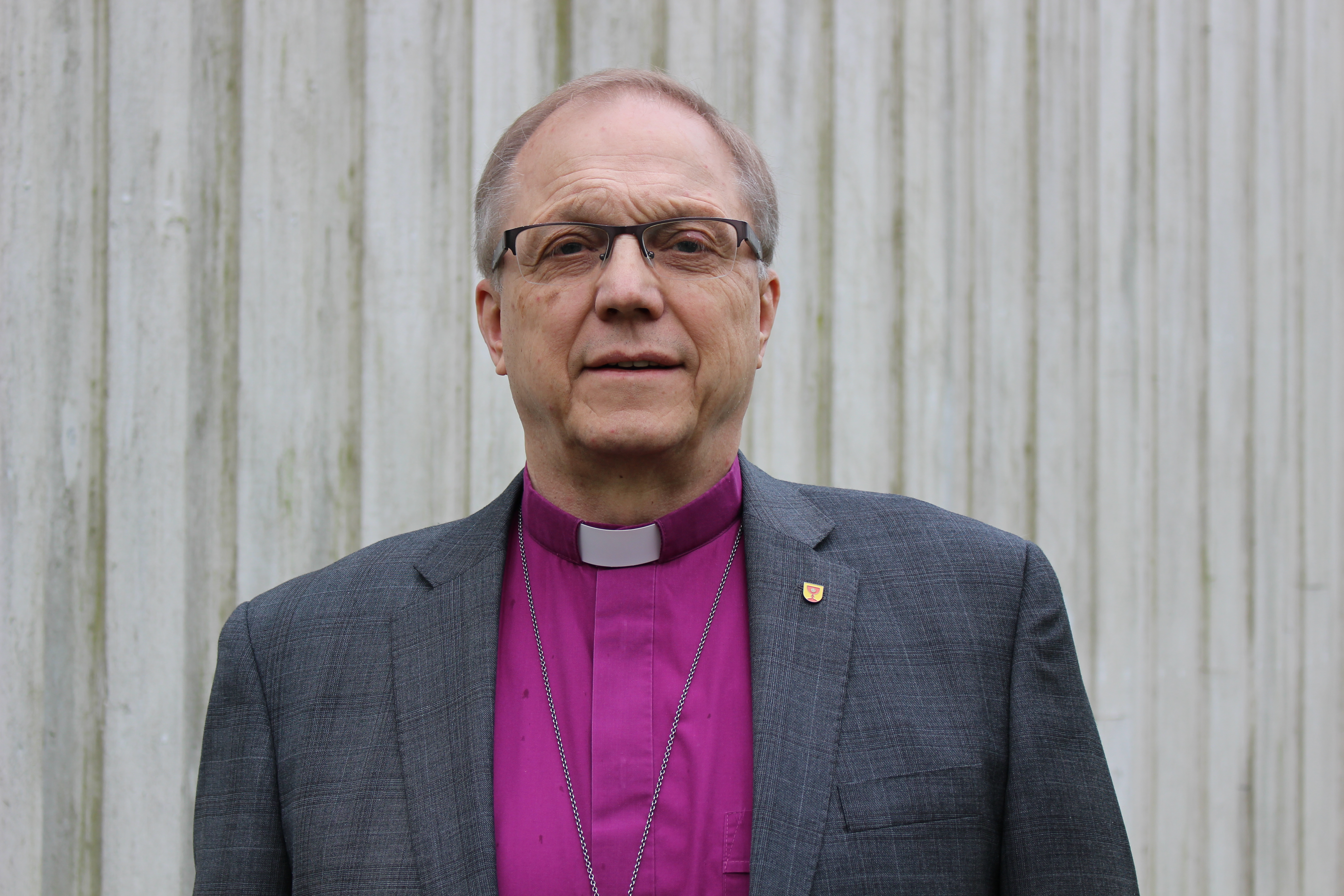
- Church: Evangelical Lutheran Mission Diocese of Finland
- Installed: 4 May 2013

Orders
- Ordination: 1985

Personal details
- Born: 13 December 1946 (age 79) Helsinki, Finland

Risto Matti Soramies (born 13 December 1946 in Helsinki, Finland) is the first bishop of the Evangelical Lutheran Mission Diocese of Finland since 4 May 2013. He was ordained by Matti Väisänen, a bishop of the Mission Province of Sweden and Finland.

In December 2014 Soramies consecrated Robert Kaumba as bishop of the Lutheran Evangelical Church in Africa—Zambia Diocese.
