= Evangelical Lutheran Church in Zimbabwe =

Protestant missionary church in Zimbabwe

- Classification: Protestant
- Orientation: Lutheran
- Theology: Lutheran
- Region: Zimbabwe
- Origin: 1903
- Members: 134,000 (2006)

The Evangelical Lutheran Church in Zimbabwe (formerly the Evangelical Lutheran Church of Southern Rhodesia) is an Evangelical Lutheran church in Zimbabwe, founded in 1903 by Swedish and South African missionaries. It has a membership of around 134,000 (as of 2006) and is a member of the Lutheran World Federation. Until 1934, it was a branch of the Swedish Lutheran mission in South Africa. It became an independent church in 1963, as the Evangelical Lutheran Church of Southern Rhodesia. Its last Church of Sweden missionary bishop was Sigfrid Strandvik, who retired in 1975. He was succeeded by a Zimbabwean, Jonas C. Shiri, who was consecrated on 18 May 1975 by Sigfrid Strandvik in the Swedish Line (Uppsala Line) of apostolic succession from the Church of Sweden.

== Literature ==
- Hugo Söderström: God Gave Growth. The History of the Lutheran Church in Zimbabwe, 1903-1980, 1984.
- Hugo Söderström, Sten Bergman, Tore Bergman: The History of the Evangelical Lutheran Church in Zimbabwe 1903-2003, Church of Sweden, 2003. ISBN 916314073X, ISBN 9789163140730 https://web.archive.org/web/20160304220513/http://www.fjellstedtska.se/ELCZ_100years.pdf
