= Arne Olsson =

Swedish Lutheran bishop (1930–2024)

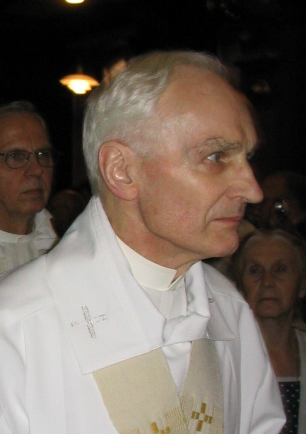
Olsson in 2005

Arne Olsson (31 March 1930 – 12 March 2024) was a Swedish Lutheran bishop. He was the first bishop of the Mission Province, serving from 2005 until 2010.

Olsson was a retired pastor in the Lutheran Church of Sweden, having been e.g. the parish priest of Habo. On 5 February 2005 in Gothenburg, he was consecrated as bishop of The Mission Province by The Most Reverend Walter Obare, the presiding bishop of the Evangelical Lutheran Church in Kenya. The Mission Province is theologically conservative and opposes women's ordination and same-sex unions and marriage. Following his consecration, the Church of Sweden disqualified him as a priest. He died on 12 March 2024.
