= Evangelical Lutheran Church in Tanzania =

Christian denomination

- Kanisa la Kiinjili la Kilutheri Tanzania
- Classification: Protestant
- Orientation: Lutheran
- Polity: Modified episcopal polity with some powers reserved to the congregation as in congregationalism
- Leader: Rev.ALEX GEHAZ MALASUSA
- Associations: Global Forum, LWF, LUCCEA. AACC, WCC, CCT, ACT, MAF, TCRS
- Region: Tanzania and Zanzibar
- Headquarters: Arusha, Tanzania
- Origin: June 19, 1963
- Branched from: Federation of Lutheran Churches in Tanganyika
- Congregations: 1,104
- Members: 7,916,253 (2020)
- Ministers: 1,500
- Official website: http://www.elct.org/

The Evangelical Lutheran Church in Tanzania (ELCT; Swahili: Kanisa la Kiinjili la Kilutheri Tanzania) is the federation of Lutheran churches in Tanzania and one of the largest Lutheran denominations in the world, with more than 6 million members, or 13% of the Tanzanian population. It is the second largest Lutheran church in the world and the largest Lutheran church in East Africa.

The church is led by a presiding bishop and twenty-eight diocesan bishops, representing 28 dioceses. The head office of the church is in Mbeya, since 1967. The church is affiliated with the All Africa Conference of Churches (AACC), the Christian Council of Tanzania, the Global Confessional and Missional Lutheran Forum, and the Lutheran World Federation.

The ELCT is an organization which reaches out to the people of Tanzania offering worship opportunities, Christian education, and numerous social services, including disaster response, healthcare, and AIDS education and relief.

== History ==
The first Lutheran missionaries arrived in what was then German East Africa in 1887, when the Evangelical Missionary Society for East Africa (EMS), based in Berlin, Germany, established a missionary station at Kigamboni, Dar es Salaam. The second group of missionaries was also from Germany, entering via South Africa and settling in the Southern Highlands region of Tanzania. Similar missions from Germany continued to arrive in the region continuously throughout the end of the 19th century and the beginning of the 20th. This mission activity continued in spite of the interruption of the Hehe Wars in 1891, the Maji Maji Uprising of 1905–1907, World War I, and World War II.

In 1938, seven Lutheran churches were loosely gathered into the Federation of Lutheran Churches in Tanganyika. The member churches then merged to become the Evangelical Lutheran Church in Tanzania.

In 1964, Johannes Lilje, then presiding bishop of the United Evangelical Lutheran Church of Germany, consecrated Stefano Moshi, who had been elected as the first presiding bishop of the newly formed church body and who had been an advocate for the establishment of episcopacy, as the first presiding bishop of the ELCT.

Bengt Sundkler, who was consecrated as a bishop in the Church of Sweden by Gunnar Hultgren at Uppsala Cathedral on 2 April 1961, was elected as the Bishop of Bukoba in the Evangelical Lutheran Church of Buhaya (a predecessor body to the ELCT) in June 1960. Sundkler, on 16 December 1984, consecrated Josiah Kibira as bishop at Bukoba Evangelical-Lutheran Cathedral and Kibira reigned as the bishop of the North-Western Diocese of the Evangelical Lutheran Church in Tanzania until 2000, later becoming the president of the Lutheran World Federation. It is through the consecration of Kibira by Sundkler that apostolic succession from the Church of Sweden (in the line of Peder Månsson) was transmitted to the ELCT.

== Organization ==
The seat of the church is in Arusha. It is financed mainly from collections and donations as well as through project grants from churches in the Global North.

The ELCT is led by a presiding bishop, or "Mkuu", who is elected to serve four year terms, and 24 bishops who preside over their local dioceses. The presiding bishop is elected for a four-year term from amongst the bishops of the dioceses. The ELCT's current presiding bishop is Alex Malasusa.

=== Presiding bishops ===
Period	Name
1964–1976	Stefano Moshi
1976–1992	Sebastian Kolowa
1994–2007	Samson Mushemba
2007–2016	Alex Malasusa
2016–2023	Fredrick Onael Shoo
2024–	Alex Malasusa

=== Clergy and church body ===
The ELCT employs 1360 ordained pastors (28 of them overseas), 3000 lay evangelists, and 300 community officers to aid the work of the church (2014 figures). Women are not ordained in all ELCT dioceses; however, as of 1990, the national church does ordain women. Ordination of women is a sensitive topic in the ELCT and the church is largely split. Currently, local dioceses make their own decision on whether to ordain women or not.

The ELCT is one of the fastest growing churches in the world, with an annual growth in baptized members of around 8%.

=== Social services ===
Social service programming is central to the mission of the ELCT. The social services offered by the Evangelical Lutheran Church in Tanzania include the following departments:

- Education (Secondary and University)
- Finance and Administration
- Health and Medical Care (21 hospitals and numerous local pharmacies)
- Mission and Evangelism
- Planning and Development
- Social Services and Women's Work
- HIV/AIDS Program
- Disaster Response

== Dioceses ==
The Evangelical Lutheran Church of Tanzania consists of the following regional dioceses:

- Central Diocese
- Dodoma Diocese
- East of Lake Victoria Diocese
- Eastern & Coastal Diocese
- Iringa Diocese
- Karagwe Diocese
- Konde Diocese
- Lake Tanganyika Diocese
- Mara Region Diocese
- Mbulu Diocese
- Meru Diocese
- Morogoro Diocese
- Mufindi Diocese
- Mwanga Diocese
- Northern Diocese
- North-Central Diocese
- North-Eastern Diocese
- North-Western Diocese
- Pare Diocese
- Ruvuma Diocese
- Southern Diocese
- South-Central Diocese
- South-East of Lake Victoria Diocese
- South-Eastern Diocese
- South-Western Diocese
- Ulanga Kilombero
- West Central Diocese

== Beliefs ==
=== Lutheranism ===
Lutheranism is associated with the theology of Martin Luther, with its official confessional writings found in the Book of Concord. Lutheranism generally accepts the unaltered Augsburg Confession (not the variata) as a true witness to the Gospel. Lutheran clergy tend not to subscribe to a doctrine of Biblical inerrancy, but see validity in various scholarly methods of analysis to help in understanding the Bible. This is in concord with most moderate Protestant bodies and in contrast to the Lutheran Church – Missouri Synod in the United States, which practices the historical-grammatical method of biblical interpretation.

Like other Lutheran church bodies, the ELCT confesses two sacraments: Communion (or the Eucharist) and Holy Baptism (including infant baptism). Confession and absolution is often included as a sacrament; however, as it is a return to the forgiveness given in baptism, strictly speaking, there are only two sacraments.

With respect to the eucharist or communion, the ELCT holds to the Lutheran doctrine of the sacramental union, that is, that Christ's body and blood is truly present "in, with and under" the bread and wine, so that all communicants orally receive not only bread and wine, but also the same body and blood of Christ that was given for them on the cross. Members of other denominations sometimes refer to this as a belief in consubstantiation. Lutherans, however, reject the philosophical explanation of consubstantiation, preferring to consider the presence of the Lord's body and blood as mysterious rather than explainable by human philosophy. The Lutheran belief in the holy mystery character of the consecrated bread and wine is more similar to that of Roman Catholic and Eastern Orthodox belief than to the views of most Protestants. In contrast, most Protestant church bodies doubt or openly deny that the actual body and blood of Christ is eaten in the Lord's Supper.

== Relations with other churches ==
The ELCT decided to establish a relationship with the North American Lutheran Church, and both churches approved a "Memorandum of Understanding" at a convocation held in August 2013, paving the way for full communion between the two churches.

== See also ==
- List of the largest Protestant bodies
