= Gunnar Hultgren =

The Most Reverend Gunnar Hultgren
- Archbishop of Uppsala; Primate of Sweden
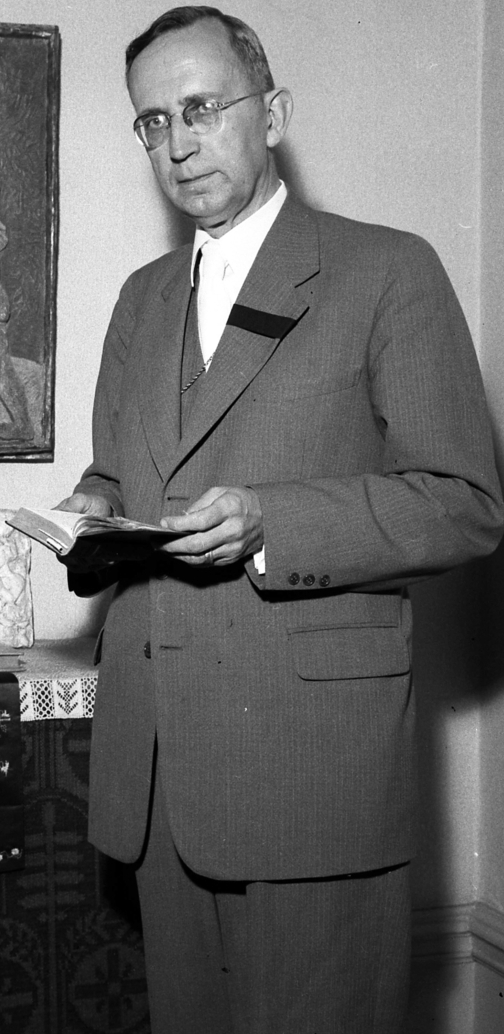
- Church: Church of Sweden
- Archdiocese: Uppsala
- Appointed: 1958
- In office: 1958–1967
- Predecessor: Yngve Brilioth
- Successor: Ruben Josefson
- Previous posts: Bishop of Visby 1947-1951); Bishop of Härnösand (1951-1958)

Orders
- Ordination: 17 May 1925
- Consecration: 1 February 1948 by Erling Eidem
- Rank: Metropolitan Archbishop

Personal details
- Born: 19 February 1902 Eskilstuna, Sweden
- Died: 13 February 1991 (aged 88) Uppsala, Sweden
- Buried: Gamla kyrkogården in Härnösand
- Parents: Axel Gustav Hultgren; Maria Kristina Andersson
- Spouse: Astrid Maria Eklund
- Education: Uppsala University
- Coat of arms

Gunnar Axel Engelbrekt Hultgren (19 February 1902 - 13 February 1991) was a Swedish bishop within the Church of Sweden. He was the Archbishop of Uppsala between 1958 and 1967.

== Biography ==
Hultgren was enrolled at Uppsala University where he became a theology graduate in 1925, theology licentiate in 1933, and Dr. Theol. in 1940. He became an associate professor of systematic theology in Uppsala in 1940. He became vicar in the Diocese of Härnösand in 1940, Bishop of the Diocese of Visby in 1947 and Bishop of the Diocese of Härnösand in 1951. He was appointed Archbishop in 1958 and resigned as Emeritus in 1967.

In 1939 his doctoral thesis on Augustine's view of love was published as a book with the title, "Det evangeliska kärleksbudet hos Augustinus: dess filosofiska och teologiska tolkning i hans skrifter 386-400" (EN: The evangelical command-to-love in Augustine: its philosophical and theological interpretations in his works from 386 to 400 CE). LIBRIS-ID 1371886.

== Other sources ==
- Hansson, Klas (2014) Svenska kyrkans primas: Ärkebiskopsämbetet i förändring 1914–1990 (Uppsala: Acta Universitatis Upsaliensi) ISBN 978-91-554-8897-0
