= Evangelical Lutheran Church in Kenya =

Kenyan Christian denomination

Evangelical Lutheran Church of Kenya
- Classification: Protestant
- Orientation: Confessional Lutheranism
- Polity: Episcopal
- Primate: The Most Reverend Dr. Joseph Ochola Omolo
- Associations: International Lutheran Council; Global Confessional and Missional Lutheran Forum; World Council of Churches
- Region: Kenya
- Founder: Martin Lundstrom
- Origin: 1948
- Branched from: Church of Sweden
- Members: 100,000-350,000

The Evangelical Lutheran Church in Kenya (Swahili: Kanisa la Kiinjili la Kilutheri Katika Kenya) is a Lutheran denomination in Kenya. It is a member of the Global Confessional and Missional Lutheran Forum, the International Lutheran Council (since 2005), and the National Council of Churches of Kenya. Its current archbishop is the Most Reverend Joseph Ochola Omolo.

== History ==
The Evangelical Lutheran Church in Kenya (ELCK) was born out of the missionary work of the Swedish Lutheran Mission in 1948 under the name Swedish Lutheran Mission (SLM). In 1963, the name of the church was changed and registered as the Lutheran Church of Kenya (LCK). In 1973, the name was changed again to ELCK with three districts, namely North District, Kisii District, and Nyanza District.

In 1996, the church adopted episcopal polity, after the pattern of the Church of Sweden from which it had derived much early influence. The first bishop, Francis Nyamwaro, was elected that year. In 2002, the church was restructured into four dioceses (Central, Lake, South-West, and North-West). The first archbishop was elected and each diocese elected a diocesan bishop.

The ELCK was formerly a member of the Lutheran World Federation, but withdrew its membership in April 2026.

== Structure ==
=== Archdiocese ===
The Uhuru Highway Lutheran Church in Kenya at Nairobi was established in 1964 and was consecrated in 1980. In 2005, this church in Nairobi was elevated to the status of a cathedral under the leadership of the first archbishop of the national church—the most Reverend Dr. Walter Obare Omwanza. Following the example of the Anglican Church of Kenya, the cathedral in Nairobi, together with its precincts, has now been separated into a distinct diocese, styled the Archdiocese of the ELCK, and named Uhuru Highway Cathedral Diocese. The cathedra of the archbishop is located here, with the archbishop heading the staff team of three ordained clergy and assorted lay ministers.

=== Dioceses ===
The entire ELCK is administered from the Nairobi Head office, the Cathedral at Uhuru Highway being the seat of the archbishop. The church consists of nine dioceses:

- Uhuru Highway Cathedral Diocese
- South-West Diocese
- Lake Diocese
- Southern Lake Diocese
- Central Eastern Diocese
- Central Rift Valley Diocese
- North-West Diocese
- Nyamira Diocese
- Kerio Valley Diocese (Established in 2022)

== Doctrine ==
The ELCK is a confessional Lutheran denomination, with doctrines centred upon the Christian scriptures of the Old and New Testaments as the inspired word of God, the catholic creeds (the Apostles' Creed, the Nicene Creed, and the Athanasian Creed), and the text of the Lutheran Augsburg Confession of 1530 together with Martin Luther's Large and Small Catechisms. The ELCK holds to mainstream Lutheran doctrines of the forgiveness of sins in baptism, and the real presence of Christ in the Eucharist.

== Mission and objectives ==
ELCK exists to proclaim the gospel of Jesus Christ through the proper administration of the sacraments, providing the confessional Lutheran teachings, and caring for the well being of the whole person. The vision of this Church is to proclaim the good news of the crucified and resurrected Christ, the only way to salvation.

== See also ==
- Walter Obare
- List of Lutheran dioceses and archdioceses
