= List of Lutheran denominations in North America =

Over 40 different Lutheran denominations currently exist in North America. However, most North American Lutherans belong to one of the three largest denominations, the Evangelical Lutheran Church in America, the Lutheran Church – Missouri Synod, or the Wisconsin Evangelical Lutheran Synod.

== Active denominations ==
Lutheran World Federation (LWF)

- Evangelical Lutheran Church in America (ELCA)
- Evangelical Lutheran Church in Canada (ELCIC)
- Mexican Lutheran Church (ILM)
- Estonian Evangelical Lutheran Church Abroad (EELK)
- Latvian Evangelical Lutheran Church in America (LELBA)

International Lutheran Council (ILC)

- American Association of Lutheran Churches (AALC)
- Lutheran Church – Canada (LCC)
- Lutheran Church – Missouri Synod (LCMS)
- Lutheran Synod of Mexico (SLM)

Confessional Evangelical Lutheran Conference (CELC)

- Confessional Evangelical Lutheran Church (IELC)
- Evangelical Lutheran Synod (ELS)
- Wisconsin Evangelical Lutheran Synod (WELS)
- WELS-Canada (WELS-CAN)

Global Confessional and Missional Lutheran Forum (Global Forum)

- Lutheran Coalition for Renewal (Lutheran CORE)
- North American Lutheran Church (NALC)
- World Mission Prayer League (WMPL)

Laestadian churches

- Apostolic Lutheran Church of America (ALCA)
- Laestadian Lutheran Church (LLC)
- Old Apostolic Lutheran Church of America (OALC)

Other active Lutheran denominations

- Association of Confessional Lutheran Churches (ACLC)
- Association of Free Lutheran Congregations (AFLC)
- Augsburg Lutheran Churches (ALC)
- Canadian Association of Lutheran Congregations (CALC)
- Church of the Lutheran Brethren of America (CLBA)
- Church of the Lutheran Confession (CLC)
- Concordia Lutheran Conference (CLC)
- Conservative Lutheran Association (CLA)
- Evangelical Lutheran Church – Eesti Synod
- Evangelical Lutheran Conference & Ministerium of North America (ELCM)
- Evangelical Lutheran Diocese of North America (ELDoNA)
- General Lutheran Church (GLC)
- Illinois Lutheran Conference (ILC)
- Independent Lutheran Diocese (ILD)
- Lutheran Church – International (LC-I)
- Lutheran Churches of the Reformation (LCR)
- Lutheran Conference of Confessional Fellowship (LCCF)
- Lutheran Congregations in Mission for Christ (LCMC)
- Lutheran Ministerium and Synod – USA (LMS-USA)
- Lutheran Orthodox Church (LOC)
- The Reformed Lutheran Church of America (RLCA)
- The Lutheran Evangelical Protestant Church (GCEPC)
- Orthodox Lutheran Confessional Conference (OLCC)
- Protes'tant Conference

== Defunct denominations ==
Most of the now-defunct North American Lutheran denominations merged or were absorbed into larger bodies. The following is an incomplete list.

- American Evangelical Lutheran Church (1878–1962)
- American Lutheran Church (The American Lutheran Church 1960–1987)
- American Lutheran Church (1930) (1930–1960)
- Anti-Missourian Brotherhood (1887–1890)
- Association of Evangelical Lutheran Churches (AELC 1978–1987)
- Augustana Catholic Church (ACC 1997, no North American congregations after 2013)
- Augustana Evangelical Lutheran Church (1860–1962)
- Augustana Orthodox & Evangelical Lutheran Synod
- Conference of the Norwegian-Danish Evangelical Lutheran Church of America (1870–1890)
- Danish Evangelical Lutheran Church Association in America (1884–1896)
- Eielsen Synod (18
- English Evangelical Lutheran Synod of Missouri and Other States (1888–1911), exists as the English District of the LCMS
- English Evangelical Lutheran Synod of the Northwest (1891–1963)
- Evangelical Lutheran Church of Canada (1967–1985)
- Evangelical Lutheran Church (1917–1960)
- Evangelical Lutheran Concordia English Synod (of Maryland, Virginia and West Virginia)
- Evangelical Lutheran Federation (disbanded 1998)
- Evangelical Lutheran General Synod of the United States of America (1820–1918)
- Evangelical Lutheran Joint Synod of Ohio (and Other States) (1818–1930)
- Evangelical Lutheran Synod of Maryland (1820–1918 / 1918–1962 / 1962–1987)
- Evangelical Lutheran Synod of Iowa (1854–1930)
- Evangelical Lutheran Synodical Conference of North America (1872–1967)
- Evangelical Lutherans in Mission (1974–1978)
- Evangelical Lutheran Tennessee Synod (1820–1920)
- Evangelical Synod of North America (1872–1934)
- Fellowship of Lutheran Congregations (1951–1956)
- Finnish Evangelical Lutheran Church of America (1890–1962)
- General Council of the Evangelical Lutheran Church in North America (1869–1918)
- Hauge Synod (1876–1917)
- Icelandic Evangelical Lutheran Synod of America (1885–1962)
- Lutheran Church in America (1962–1987)
- Lutheran Confessional Synod (1994–c. 2012)
- Lutheran Council in the United States of America (LCUSA) (1962–1987)
- Lutheran Free Church (1897–1963)
- Lutheran Synod of Buffalo (1845–1930)
- National Evangelical Lutheran Church (1898–1965), merged into the LCMS
- National Lutheran Council (NLC 1918–1966)
- Norwegian Augustana Synod (1870–1890)
- Pennsylvania Ministerium (Ministerium of Pennsylvania) (1748–1918)
- Slovak Zion Synod, exists as one of 65 synods of the ELCA
- Synod of the Norwegian Evangelical Lutheran Church in America (1853–1917)
- Synod of Evangelical Lutheran Churches, (1902–1971) exists as SELC District of the LCMS
- United Evangelical Lutheran Church (1896–1960)
- United Lutheran Church in America (1918–1962)
- United Norwegian Lutheran Church of America (1890–1917)
- United Synod of the Evangelical Lutheran Church in the South (1861–1918)

== Chart of splits and mergers ==
Chart of splits and mergers of North American Lutheran churches

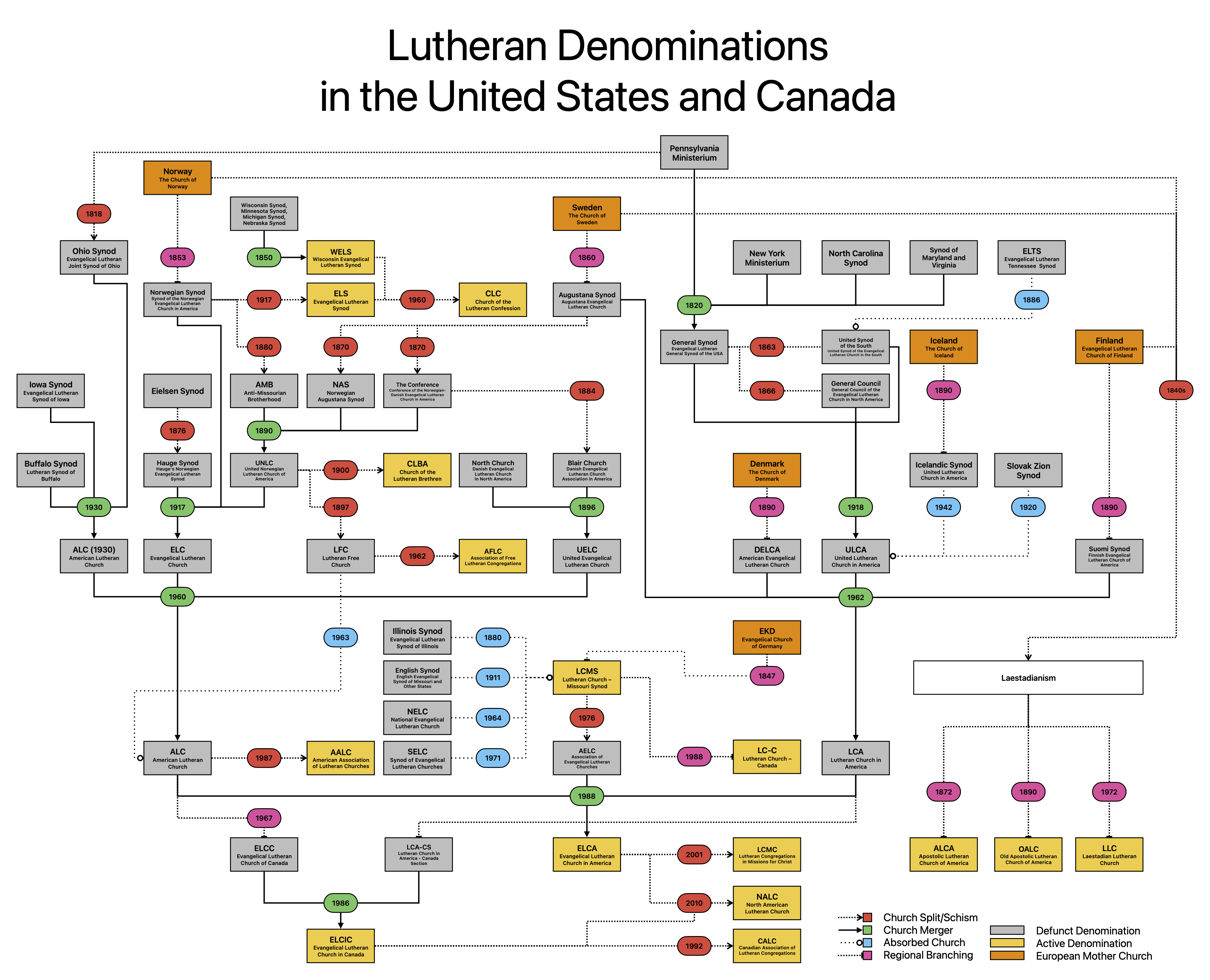

== See also ==
- List of Lutheran denominations
