= Evangelical Lutheran Free Church (Germany) =

- Abbreviation: ELFK
- Classification: Protestant
- Orientation: Lutheran
- Scripture: Bible
- Polity: Congregational
- Region: Germany, Austria
- Origin: 1876
- Congregations: 20
- Members: 1,300
- Ministers: 17
- Primary schools: 1
- Official website: www.elfk.de

The Evangelical Lutheran Free Church (German: Evangelisch-Lutherische Freikirche, abbreviated ELFK) is a confessional Lutheran denomination based in Germany and Austria. It currently consists of 1,300 members in 17 congregations. The ELFK maintains a seminary for the training of pastors in the city of Leipzig.

The Evangelical Lutheran Free Church is a member of the Confessional Evangelical Lutheran Conference, a worldwide organization of Lutheran church bodies of the same beliefs. It is independent of the Protestant Church in Germany and can be classified as a free church as it is an independent denomination.

== History ==
The ELFK (acronym based on its German name) formed in 1876 in reaction to the perceived deviations from Scripture and the Lutheran Confessions by some of the German state churches.

In its early years many ELFK pastors were trained in Lutheran Church–Missouri Synod seminaries in the U.S., until a seminary was established at Leipzig in 1921. The ELFK maintained strong relations with the LCMS until 1987, when fellowship was suspended on account of the LCMS's refusal to break fellowship with the less-conservative West German-based Independent Evangelical-Lutheran Church.

In 1993 the ELFK joined with the strongly confessional Wisconsin Evangelical Lutheran Synod and others in forming the Confessional Evangelical Lutheran Conference.

== Beliefs ==
The Evangelical Lutheran Free Church teaches that the Bible is the only authoritative source for doctrine. It subscribes to the Lutheran Confessions (the Book of Concord, 1580) as accurate presentations of what Scripture teaches, that Jesus is the center of Scripture and the only way to eternal salvation, and that the Holy Spirit uses the gospel alone in Word and Sacraments (Baptism and Holy Communion) to bring people to faith in Jesus as Savior and keep them in that faith, strengthening them in their daily life of sanctification.

== Church fellowship ==
Fellowship between the Evangelical Lutheran Free Church and other church groups is established only upon investigation and confirmation that both church groups hold complete unity in scriptural doctrine and practice.

The Evangelical Lutheran Free Church is in fellowship with the members of the Confessional Evangelical Lutheran Conference, all of which meet this requirement. It is also a member of said organization.

== Education ==
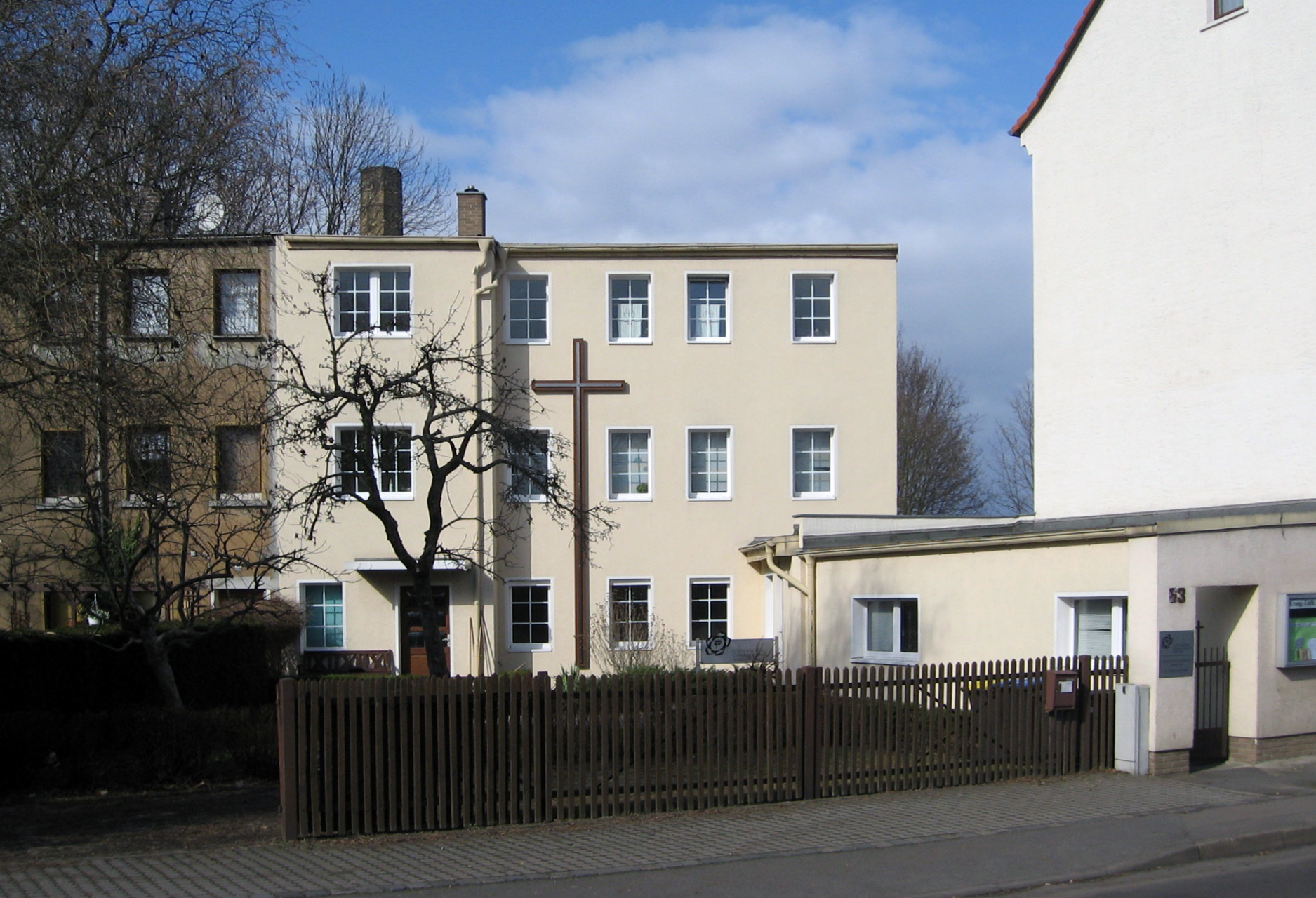
The Lutheran Theological Seminary is a part of the St. Trinitatisgemeinde Leipzig church in Leipzig, Germany

Dr. Martin Luther School (German: Dr. Martin Luther Schule) is a grade 1-4 school of the ELFK in Zwickau, Germany.

The Lutheran Theological Seminary is a seminary of the Evangelical Lutheran Free Church in Leipzig, Germany. The seminary trains students to become pastors for the Evangelical Lutheran Free Church or for member church bodies of the Confessional Evangelical Lutheran Conference.

== Publishing ==
Concordia Buchhandlung is a bookstore and the publisher of the ELFK in Zwickau. The publisher regularly prints the monthly newsletters of the ELFK, the “Lutherische Gemeindebriefe”. They also publish the quarterly of the Lutheran Theological Seminary, “Theologische Handreichung und Information”, and a devotion book, “Gott ist für uns.”
