= Lutheran Church of Central Africa =

- Classification: Lutheran
- Orientation: Confessional Lutheran
- Scripture: Bible
- Polity: Congregational
- Associations: Confessional Evangelical Lutheran Conference
- Region: Zambia & Malawi
- Founder: Wisconsin Evangelical Lutheran Synod
- Origin: 1955; Lusaka, Zambia
- Congregations: 200
- Members: 40,000 baptized

The Lutheran Church of Central Africa or LCCA is a Christian denomination of the Lutheran tradition based in the African countries of Zambia and Malawi. Currently (2004), it consists of over 40,000 baptized members in 200 congregations spread throughout both countries.

The LCCA maintains the Lutheran Seminary for the training of ministers, in Lusaka, the capital of Zambia, and the Lutheran Bible Institute, a pre-seminary pastoral training school based in Lilongwe, Malawi.

== Structure ==
=== Government ===
Technically, the two members of the LCCA, the Lutheran Church of Central Africa - Malawi Conference (LCCA-MC) and the Lutheran Church of Central Africa - Zambia Conference (LCCA-ZC) are both members of the overarching synod known as the Lutheran Church of Central Africa. In practice, due to political borders, both conferences operate independently of one another, their only true link being in the sharing of pastoral training facilities in Lusaka and Lilongwe.

The LCCA-MC and LCCA-ZC are led by a president and a chairman, respectively, both elected for four year terms in bienual conventions within their own conferences. Synodical conventions are intended to be held regularly, but often are not, due to political borders.

=== Educational institutions ===
The LCCA runs two facilities for the training of clergy. The first is the Lutheran Bible Institute, located in Lilongwe, Malawi. It is intended as a three-year pre-seminary school and serves students from both of the LCCA's conferences.

The second facility is the Lutheran Seminary located in Lusaka, Zambia. The Lutheran Seminary is a three-year seminary for the training of clergy for the LCCA and trains students from both of the LCCA's conferences. Following training at the Lutheran Seminary students typically serve a one-year vicarship after which they are ordained as clergy.

=== Other institutions ===
The LCCA maintains The Lutheran Press on the campus of the Lutheran Seminary, in Lusaka, Zambia and at the Lutheran Bible Institute in Lilongwe. The Lutheran Press publishes and prints various religious materials for use by the LCCA.

Among Lutheran Press publications are various local language hymnals, educational materials and an occasional newsletter.

== History ==
The Lutheran Church of Central Africa was established by Lutheran missionaries from the Wisconsin Evangelical Lutheran Synod. First exploratory mission work began in the 1949 (with the first resident missionaries arriving in 1953) in the British colony of Northern Rhodesia (later to become the country of Zambia). In 1955, an official denomination, named the Rhodesian Lutheran Church Conference was organized. In 1962, the Rhodesian Lutheran Church Conference was reorganized and became The Lutheran Church of Central Africa.

Exploratory mission work in the neighboring country of Malawi after 1962 led to the foundation of the Malawi Conference of the LCCA.

The LCCA is currently involved in mission work in Mozambique, with the eventual goal of setting up a sister church there.

== Beliefs ==
The LCCA teaches that the Bible is the only authoritative source for doctrine. It subscribes to the Lutheran Confessions (the Book of Concord, 1580) as accurate presentations of what Scripture teaches. It teaches that Jesus is the center of Scripture and the only way to eternal salvation, and that the Holy Spirit uses the gospel alone in Word and Sacraments (Baptism and Holy Communion) to bring people to faith in Jesus as Savior and keep them in that faith, strengthening them in their daily life of sanctification.

Doctrinally, both conferences of the LCCA are in union.

== Ecumenical relations ==
Fellowship relations between the LCCA and other church groups are established only upon investigation and confirmation that both church groups hold complete unity in scriptural doctrine and practice.

The LCCA is closely associated with the Wisconsin Evangelical Lutheran Synod. It is also a member of the Confessional Evangelical Lutheran Conference (CELC), a worldwide organization of confessional Lutheran church bodies.

== See also ==
- Wisconsin Evangelical Lutheran Synod
- List of Christian denominations in Malawi
