= Lutheran Confessional Church =

- Lutherska Bekännelsekyrkan
- Classification: Protestant
- Orientation: Lutheran
- Scripture: Bible
- Theology: Confessional Lutheran
- Region: Sweden, Norway
- Separations: Evangelical-Lutheran Confessional Church (1987)
- Congregations: 7
- Members: 220

The Lutheran Confessional Church (Swedish: Lutherska Bekännelsekyrkan, LBK) is a Christian Lutheran church, originally organised in 1974, with congregations in Sweden and Norway. It has church fellowship with the Wisconsin Evangelical Lutheran Synod.

The church was organised in 1974 when Wisconsin Evangelical Lutheran Synod's pastor Siegbert Becker was called to teach to Stiftelsen Biblicum. The church works in both Sweden and Norway. In Sweden its official magazine is Bibel och bekännelse, which appears five times each year. Its Norwegian version, Bibel og Bekjennelse, appears four times per year.

The LBK is a member of the international Confessional Evangelical Lutheran Conference.

== Congregations ==
=== Sweden ===
- S:t Paulus församling, Uppsala and Stockholm
- Heliga Trefaldighets Församling, Gothenburg
- S:t Markus församling, Ljungby
- Immanuelförsamlingen, Umeå
- S:t Jakobs församling, Piteå
- LBK i Västerås & Norrköping

=== Norway ===
- Den lutherske forsamling, Avaldsnes
- St Lukas forsamling, Stavanger
