= Evangelical Lutheran Church "Concord" =

- Евангелическо-лютеранская церковь «Согласие»
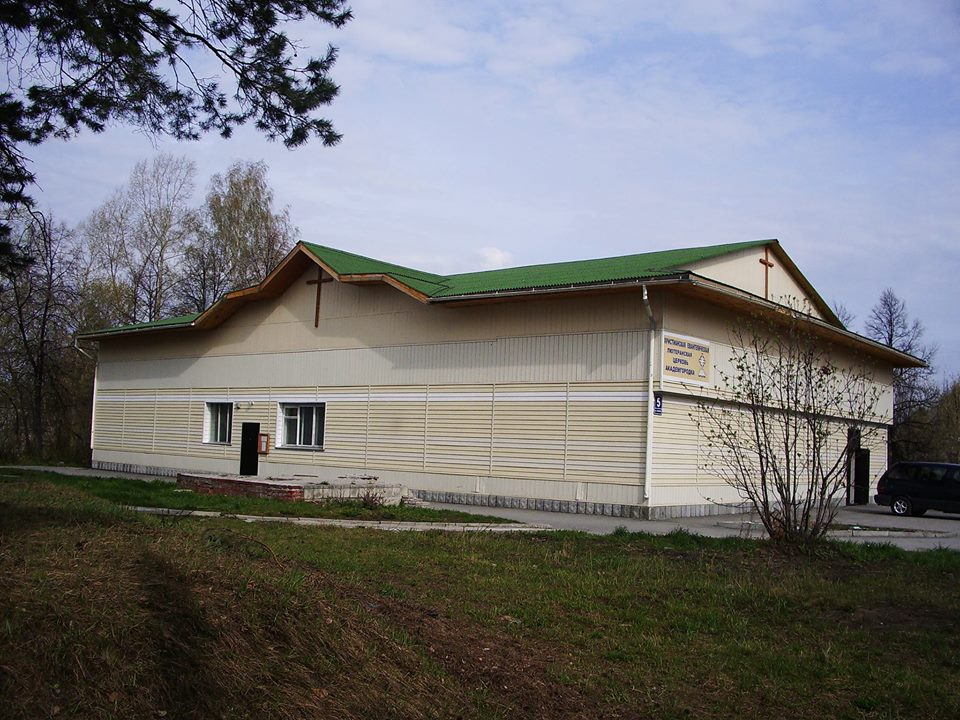
- Classification: Protestant
- Orientation: Lutheran
- Scripture: Bible
- Associations: Confessional Evangelical Lutheran Conference
- Headquarters: Akademgorodok, Novosibirsk
- Territory: Siberia, Russia
- Congregations: 5
- Official website: www.luteranin.ru

The Evangelical Lutheran Church "Concord" (Евангелическо-Лютеранская Церковь "Согласие") is a small confessional Lutheran denomination based in Russia. Established in 1992, it is a mission denomination assisted by missionaries supported by the Wisconsin Evangelical Lutheran Synod. It currently consists of five congregations and several Christian Information Centers, all in the province of Siberia in Russia.

The denomination is headquartered in Akademgorodok, just south of Novosibirsk where it also operates a seminary for the training of clergy.

== Affiliations ==
The Evangelical Lutheran Church "Concord" is a member of the Confessional Evangelical Lutheran Conference.
