= Lutheran Confessional Synod =

Logo of the Lutheran Confessional Synod

The Lutheran Confessional Synod (LCS) was a Confessional Lutheran church, characterized by a strict interpretation of the Lutheran Confessions and a historical liturgy. Organized in 1994, when Christ Lutheran Church in Decatur, Illinois, broke away from the Evangelical Lutheran Church in America, it initially declared doctrinal agreement with the Wisconsin Evangelical Lutheran Synod and the Evangelical Lutheran Synod, but broke fellowship with those two synods on June 14, 1997, because of differences in the doctrine of the ministry and the Lord's Supper. The LCS organized the Johann Gerhard Institute (a denominational publishing house) and St. Anselm Theological Seminary in 1996.

The LCS' first bishop was the Rev. Randy L. DeJaynes, consecrated to that position on October 7, 1994. As of 2009, stating a "desire to return to the Apostolic faith," some former LCS clergy were chrismated in the Antiochian Orthodox Christian Archdiocese of North America, while others entered the Roman Catholic Church. At least one is now a pastor in the Evangelical Lutheran Diocese of North America. By 2012, it was reported that the church body had disbanded.
