= Independent Evangelical-Lutheran Church =

German Lutheran denomination

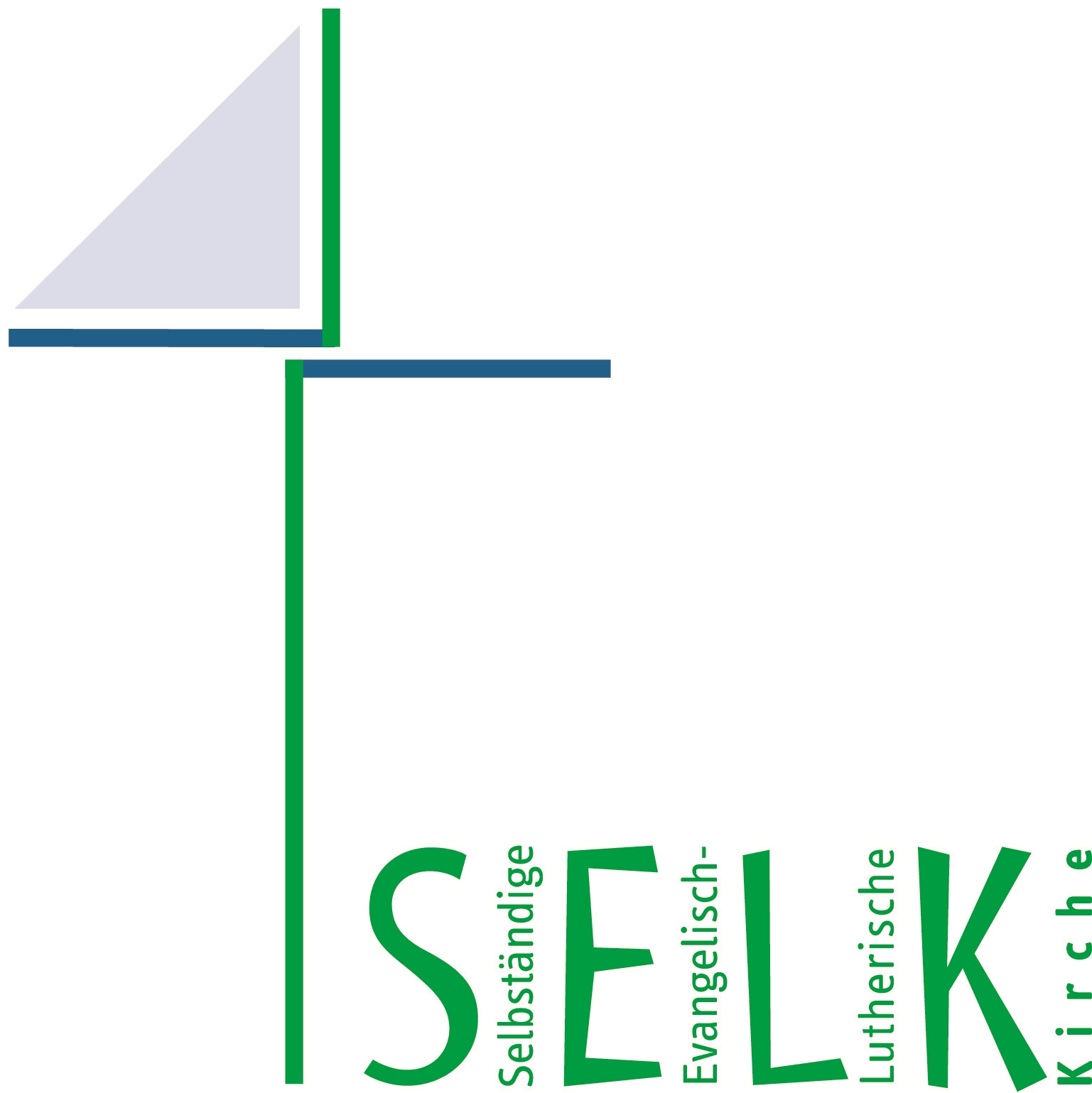
- Abbreviation: SELK
- Classification: Protestant
- Orientation: Confessional Lutheran
- Polity: Episcopal
- Leader: Bishop Hans-Jörg Voigt
- Distinct fellowships: Lutheran Church – Missouri Synod, Lutheran Church – Canada
- Associations: International Lutheran Council, European Lutheran Conference
- Region: Germany
- Origin: 25. June 1972, (Old Lutherans 1830)
- Branched from: Prussian Lutheran Church
- Merger of: Evangelical Lutheran Church in Prussia and other independent West German Lutheran churches (1972)
- Absorbed: Evangelical-Lutheran (Old-Lutheran) Church of East Germany (1991)
- Congregations: 174
- Members: 33,474
- Ministers: 111 Pastors
- Other name: German: Selbständige Evangelisch-Lutherische Kirche
- Official website: www.selk.de

The Independent Evangelical-Lutheran Church (German: Selbständige Evangelisch-Lutherische Kirche, abbreviated SELK) is a confessional Lutheran church body of Germany. It is a member of the European Lutheran Conference and of the International Lutheran Council (ILC) (of which the Lutheran Church – Missouri Synod of North America is also a member). The SELK has about 33,000 members in 174 congregations. The seat of SELK is in Hanover.

== History ==
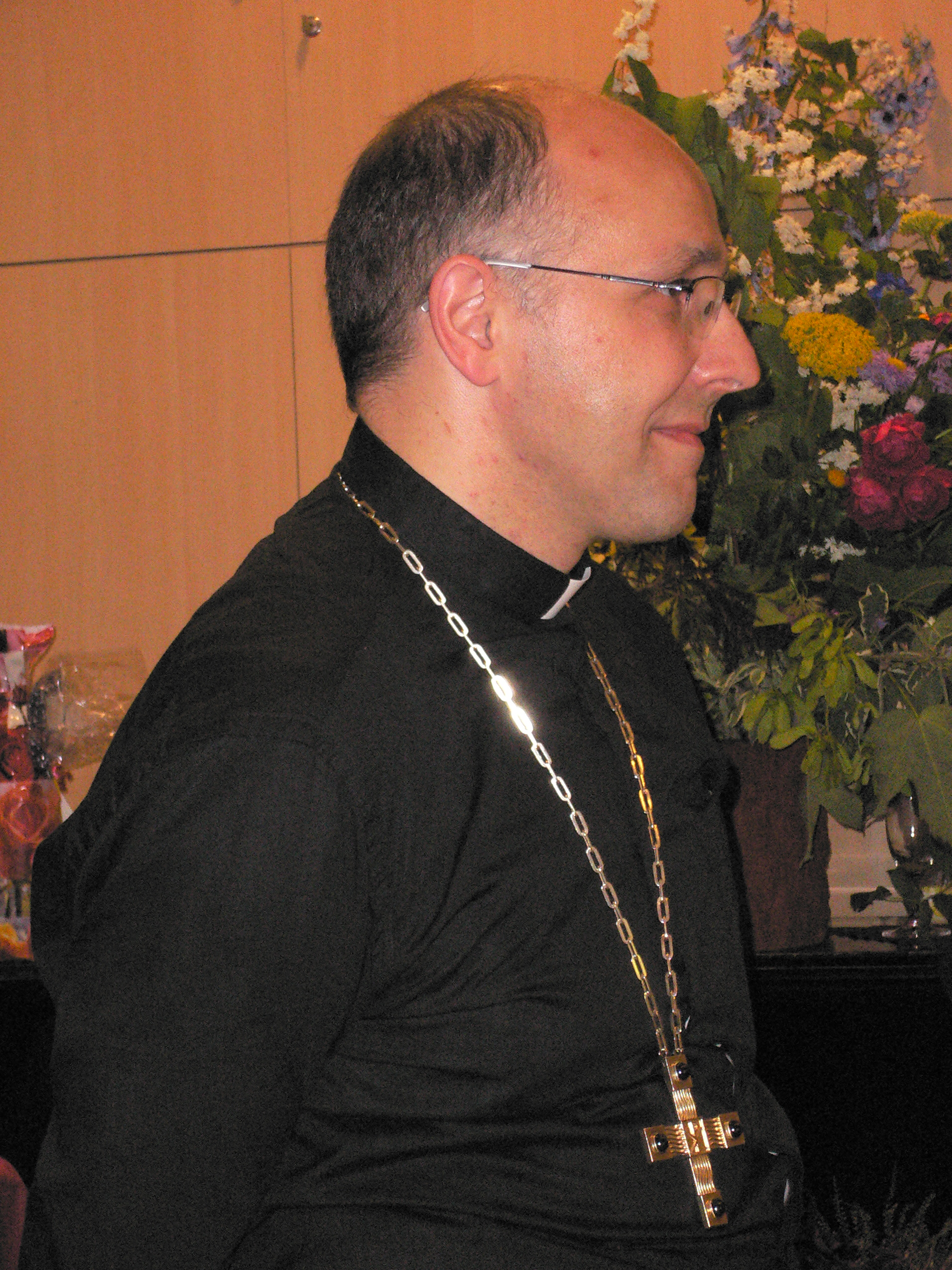
Bishop Hans-Jörg Voigt

In 1817, King Frederick William III of Prussia ordered the Lutheran and Reformed churches in his territory to unite, forming the Evangelical Church of the Prussian Union, a predecessor to today's Union of Evangelical Churches. As the uniting of Lutheran and Reformed Christians in Germany proceeded, some Lutheran groups dissented and formed independent churches, especially in Prussia, Saxony, Hanover, and Hesse. These Lutherans held that Reformed doctrine and Lutheran doctrine are contradictory on many points (especially on the nature of the Real Presence of Christ in the Lord's Supper), and that such doctrinal differences precluded altar fellowship. So in the 1820s and 1830s Lutherans in Prussia and their congregations formed a new Lutheran church, recognised by the king in 1845 as the Evangelisch-Lutherische Kirche in Preußen (Evangelical Lutheran Church in Prussia). It was seated in Breslau and presided over by the Oberkirchenkollegium (Supreme Church Collegial Body).

The confessional Lutherans were persecuted during the first half of 19th century by the state. Many of them were not allowed to hold church services or have their children baptized or confirmed according to the liturgy of the Lutheran Church. In some areas of Germany, it took decades until the Confessional Lutherans were granted religious freedom.

In 1972, most of the Confessional Lutheran Church bodies in West Germany united to form the SELK. In 1991, the East German Evangelisch-Lutherische (altlutherische) Kirche (the Evangelical-Lutheran (Old-Lutheran) Church) joined the SELK.

== Doctrine ==
=== Basics ===
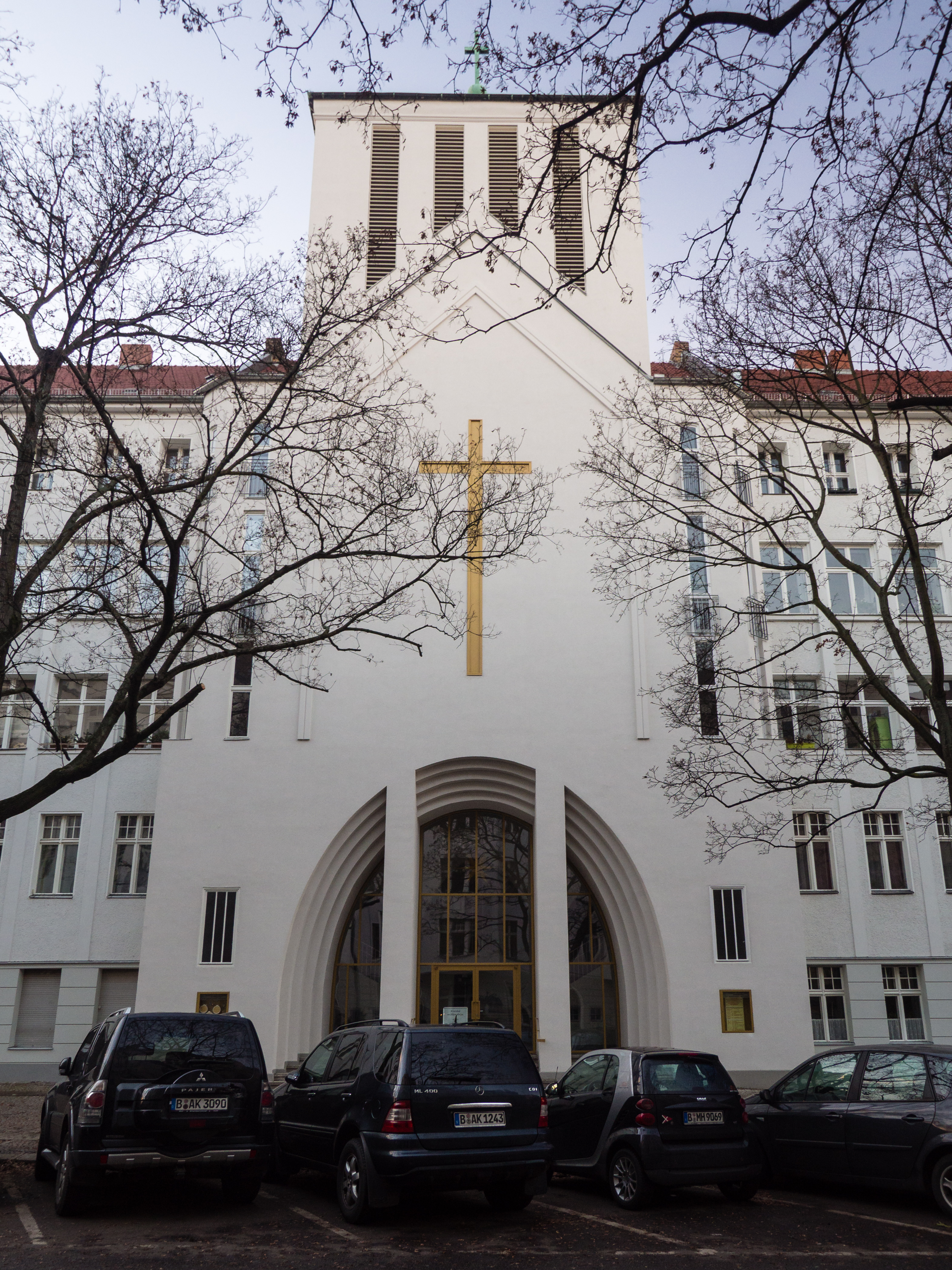
Holy Cross Lutheran Church, Berlin (de)

The SELK bases its teaching on the Bible, consisting of the Old and New Testaments, which it confesses to be God's inerrant and infallible Word. The specific doctrines taught in the SELK are contained in the Book of Concord, to which SELK pastors profess a "quia" subscription, meaning that they subscribe to them, "quia" (because) they correspond to the Bible. These Confessions are:

- The Apostles' Creed
- The Nicene Creed
- The Athanasian Creed
- The Augsburg Confession (1530)
- The Apology of the Augsburg Confession
- The Smalcald Articles
- The Small Catechism of Dr. Martin Luther
- The Large Catechism of Dr. Martin Luther
- The Formula of Concord

The SELK has declined to join the Lutheran World Federation, viewing that body as theologically too liberal. Nevertheless, the Evangelical Lutheran Free Church (Germany), formerly in communion with the SELK, suspended relations in 1987 over perceived doctrinal laxity within SELK.

The SELK does not ordain women as pastors, and is strictly against the blessing of gay couples. This is in contrast to the German mainline Protestant churches, which do ordain women to ministry and allow the blessing of gay couples. The mainline Protestant churches (about 25 million members) are organized as the Protestant Church in Germany (Evangelische Kirche in Deutschland, EKD).

== Church structure ==
The bishop of the SELK is elected by the synod. The current bishop is Hans-Jörg Voigt. The main office of the SELK is in Hannover and is managed by the executive church council, since January 2024 and currently Daniel Soluk. The SELK is divided in four main districts, with a provost heading each one. These four districts are divided again in sub-districts, each in turn led by a superintendent.

- North district: Provost Dr. Daniel Schmidt
  - Sub-districts: Lower Saxony East and Lower Saxony South
- East district: Provost Gert Kelter
  - Sub-districts: Berlin-Brandenburg, Saxony-Thuringia, and Lausitz
- West district: Provost Burkhard Kurz
  - Sub-districts: Rhineland-Westphalia and Lower Saxony West
- South district: Provost Manfred Holst
  - Sub-districts: Hesse North, Hesse South, and South Germany

== Bishops since 1972 ==
- 1972–1985: Most Reverend Bishop Dr. theol. Gerhard Rost, LL.D.
- 1985–1997: Most Reverend Bishop Dr. theol. Jobst Schöne, D.D.
- 1997–2006: Most Reverend Bishop Dr. theol. Diethardt Roth
- 2006–present: Most Reverend Bishop Hans-Jörg Voigt, D.D.

== Church institutions ==
=== Mission ===
The mission outreach of SELK is led by its mission society in Bleckmar in Lower Saxony near Celle, called Lutherische Kirchenmission (Bleckmarer Mission) e. V. It has missionaries and projects in South-Africa, Botswana, Germany, and Brazil.

=== Education ===
The theological seminary is in Oberursel, near Frankurt/Main. All SELK pastors take part of their studies there. The professors are pastors of SELK. The seminary is accredited by the German state.

=== Other church institutions ===
For different aspects of church life the SELK has a number of other institutions, such as an institution for youth, church music, worship service for children, a liturgy commission, and a commission for church education.

== Relationship with other church bodies ==
=== Fellowship ===
The SELK has full communion and fellowship with several Lutheran churches that have the same teaching and Lutheran doctrine, for example:

1. Lutheran Church – Missouri Synod
2. Lutheran Church – Canada
3. Free Evangelical-Lutheran Synod in South Africa
4. Evangelical Lutheran Church of England
5. Lutheran Church in Southern Africa
6. The Mission province in Sweden

=== Partnership ===
The SELK has a contract about partnership relations with several Lutheran churches in Eastern Europe:

- Evangelical Lutheran Church of Latvia
- Evangelical Lutheran Church in Lithuania

== See also ==
- Prussian Union of churches
- Old Lutherans
