= Evangelical Lutheran Church in Sweden =

Confessional Lutheran denomination in Sweden

The Evangelical Lutheran Church in Sweden (ELKS), (Swedish, Evangelisk-lutherska kyrkan i Sverige) is a confessional Lutheran denomination in Sweden. The church was founded in 1968 by the Evangelical Lutheran Congregation of St. Martin, which was formed in 1961 by people that had left the Church of Sweden. Their first pastor was ThD Tom G.A. Hardt until his death in 1998. The background of the formation is that Sweden in 1951 got freedom of religion, before that free Lutheran churches were illegal. (Some denominations were allowed by the state, such as Baptists, Methodists and the Roman Catholic Church among a few others.) Another fact that may have contributed is that Church of Sweden in 1958 decided to introduce female priests (article 2025-11-24 existing only in Swedish).

As of 2006, the congregation had not gained significant membership.

== Fellowship ==
In 2005 ELKS established church fellowship with the Swedish denomination Concordia Lutheran Church, and in 2020 with St Jude the Apostle Evangelical Lutheran Church, Melbourne, Australia.
