= Christian Family Solutions =

Lutheran social service agency in the United States

- Abbreviation: CFS
- Formation: July 13, 1965; 61 years ago
- Type: Nonprofit organization
- Headquarters: Germantown, Wisconsin
- Affiliations: Wisconsin Evangelical Lutheran Synod
- Website: christianfamilysolutions.org

Christian Family Solutions (CFS), previously known as WLCFS Christian Family Solutions and Wisconsin Lutheran Child & Family Service, is an American non-profit social service agency headquartered in Germantown, Wisconsin. It is affiliated with, but not financially supported by, the Wisconsin Evangelical Lutheran Synod (WELS).

== History ==
Christian Family Solutions was founded in 1965 as Wisconsin Lutheran Convalescent Home, a joint outgrowth of the Bethany Convalescent Home in Milwaukee and the Lutheran Children's Friend Society in Wauwatosa, Wisconsin. Later in 1965, the Board of Directors determined that there was a significant need for a child welfare agency within the WELS.

On March 4, 1966, the official name of the agency was changed to Wisconsin Lutheran Child & Family Service, Inc. to reflect the two divisions of the agency (child welfare and convalescent/aging). The child welfare division included Christian Family Counseling and an adoption service.

On September 24, 1967, WLCFS held a groundbreaking ceremony for a 48-bed addition to the 116-bed residence for the aging and a two-story building that housed the child welfare and administrative offices.

In 1980, WLCFS created a subsidiary named Wisconsin Lutheran Retirement Community, Inc. (WLRC) to build and oversee Luther Haven, an independent retirement community in Milwaukee.

In 1994, the adoption service of WLCFS was closed, and the name of the existing convalescent home was changed to Wisconsin Lutheran Care Center.

The addition of Wisconsin Lutheran Living Center, an assisted living facility in Milwaukee, was completed in 1997.

In 2008, WLCFS started the Member Assistance Program, a customized and comprehensive way for churches, schools, and organizations to assist in meeting the emotional or psychological needs of their members and students by providing them with convenient, affordable Christian services, like counseling, consultation, and educational presentations. These services can be provided either in person or via a secure video connection anywhere in the world, utilizing a web cam and a secure Internet connection.

In June 2009, WLCFS dedicated its latest facility, The Gardens of Hartford, an assisted living facility in Hartford, Wisconsin.

In January 2011, WLCFS-Christian Family Solutions acquired Samaritan at Home Care, which provides non-medical in-home care services to the disabled, the elderly, and expectant or new mothers in the communities surrounding Milwaukee. Later, the name of this program was changed to Christian Family Solutions Home Care.

In September 2011, WLCFS finalized the sale of the nursing home, Wisconsin Lutheran Care Center, to an outside company. The facility is now known as Milwaukee Estates Living & Care Center.

In October 2011, WLCFS became known as WLCFS-Christian Family Solutions to reflect a more global reach of its services. The agency's legal name remains Wisconsin Lutheran Child & Family Service, Inc.

In February 2012, WLCFS-Christian Family Solutions moved its corporate headquarters to Germantown, Wisconsin.

== Today ==
Christian Family Solutions currently owns and operates an assisted living facility on Milwaukee’s northwest side and an assisted living facility in Hartford, Wisconsin. It also offers in-home care and elder care programs, as well as counseling and therapy services.
