= General Lutheran Church =

General Lutheran Church, Inc.
- Classification: Protestant
- Theology: Confessional Lutheran
- Governance: Semi-Congregationalist
- Founder: Rev. Dr. James Walter Clifton
- Origin: 2014; Indiana/ Puerto Rico
- Official website: https://www.generallutheranchurch.org/

The General Lutheran Church, Inc. (GLC) is a small Lutheran denomination organized on March 9, 2014, and incorporated in the state of Indiana on October 26, 2017. The address of incorporation passed to Puerto Rico when the church changed leadership. It was founded when ministers of several Lutheran church bodies (namely: Association of Independent Evangelical Lutheran Churches, Fellowship of Evangelical Lutheran Churches, Independent Lutheran Diocese, Lutheran Evangelical Ministries, Lutheran Evangelical Protestant Churches, Lutheran Orthodox Church, and Missionary Lutheran Church) who objected to various positions held in their respective churches, specifically regarding atonement, women's ordination, worship styles, and the Lutheran Confessions, met to discuss these and other issues of concern. This meeting led to the establishment of the General Lutheran Church and to its endorsement of universal salvation, women's ordination, and flexibility with regards to liturgical matters. The church claims to be a successor to the former Evangelical Lutheran General Synod of the United States of America.

== Theological statement ==
The General Lutheran Church affirms the authority and inspiration of Holy Scripture as the primary source and norm of Christian doctrine and practice. It recognizes the Lutheran Confessions contained in the Book of Concord as important theological standards and embraces the central teachings of the Lutheran Reformation, including justification by grace through faith, the centrality of Jesus Christ, and the administration of the sacraments.

The denomination professes faith in the Holy Trinity—Father, Son, and Holy Spirit—and affirms the historic Christian doctrines of the Incarnation, the atoning work of Christ, and the resurrection. The church recognizes Holy Baptism and Holy Communion as the two sacraments instituted by Christ.

In addition to its confessional Lutheran heritage, the GLC places particular emphasis on Trinitarian theology, participation in the life of Christ, and engagement with broader Christian theological traditions. The denomination has encouraged dialogue with other Christian communities while maintaining its Lutheran doctrinal identity.

The denomination expect congregations and ministers to abide by the following set of beliefs:

- Belief in the Father, Son, and Holy Spirit. -- John 1:18
- Belief that Jesus Christ is the Lord and Savior of all. -- First Corinthians 15:22
- Belief that the Bible is the Verbally, Inspired and Inerrant Word of God, and sufficient guide for faith and practice. -- Matthew 4:4; 2 Timothy 3:16
- Belief in two sacraments: Holy Baptism and Holy Communion. -- Luke 22:14-20
- Belief in the just retribution for sin. -- Colossians 3:25
- Belief that there is a wideness in God's mercy. -- Ephesians 2:4-7

The denomination states that it is not an “Evangelical Catholic” community in the sense of having the desire to unite, either ecclesiastically or theologically, with the Roman Catholic church, or any of its positions stated in the Council of Trent and later councils. Rather the GLC professes to be a community that adheres to the generally accepted principles, dogmas, and doctrines of the Protestant faith within Christianity as stated in the Lutheran Confessions.

== Polity ==
The General Lutheran Church is a semi-congregationalist denomination headed by the general leadership, which consists of the Bishop, the General Dean, and the provost of the Institute of Pastoral Ministry. The Bishop is the presiding officer, executive administrator, and spiritual leader of the denomination. The Bishop is invested with the responsibility of ensuring the purpose and mission of the General Lutheran Church are carried out and that the statement of faith and the general principles of the Christian faith are adhered to. Responsibilities include overseeing and regulating issues related to the administrative, legislative, ministerial, evangelistic, educational, missionary, benevolent, and other interests of the denomination. The General Dean is appointed by the dean and serves to assist, advise, and counsel the dean. The General Dean has no decision-making powers. All final decisions regarding polity and procedure belong exclusively to the dean. The national leadership exercises no control or authority over individual congregations or pastors and serves only in an advisory capacity. It assists pastors in crisis situations or by request.

== Pastoral training ==
Martin Luther School of Bible and Theology offers free certificate courses in systematic theology, Lutheran history, pastoral counseling, biblical languages, pastoral theology, and the Lutheran confessions to meet the academic requirements for ordination as a General Lutheran minister. The courses are taught by qualified faculty who all hold degrees from institutions accredited by agencies recognized by the United States Department of Education or hold accredited status in their respective countries. The institute is a member of the Concordia Academic Theology Consortium, Intl., which is a partnership and collaboration effort among the following independent not for profit international institutions that deal in sharing credit-bearing theological courses and programs.

- International Faith Theological Seminary and University College (Kenya)
- Mosupatsela Lutheran Theological College (South Africa)
- Martin Luther School of Bible and Theology (USA)

== Social statement ==
The General Lutheran Church upholds traditional Christian teachings regarding marriage and ordained ministry. The denomination opposes abortion except in limited medical circumstances and maintains traditional positions concerning human sexuality.

At the same time, the church formally condemns racism, xenophobia, sexism, homophobia, and all forms of hatred, discrimination, and abusive behavior, affirming the dignity of all people and encouraging respectful engagement within society.
