= Hans-Jörg Voigt =

German Lutheran bishop

- Bishop of the Independent Evangelical Lutheran Church
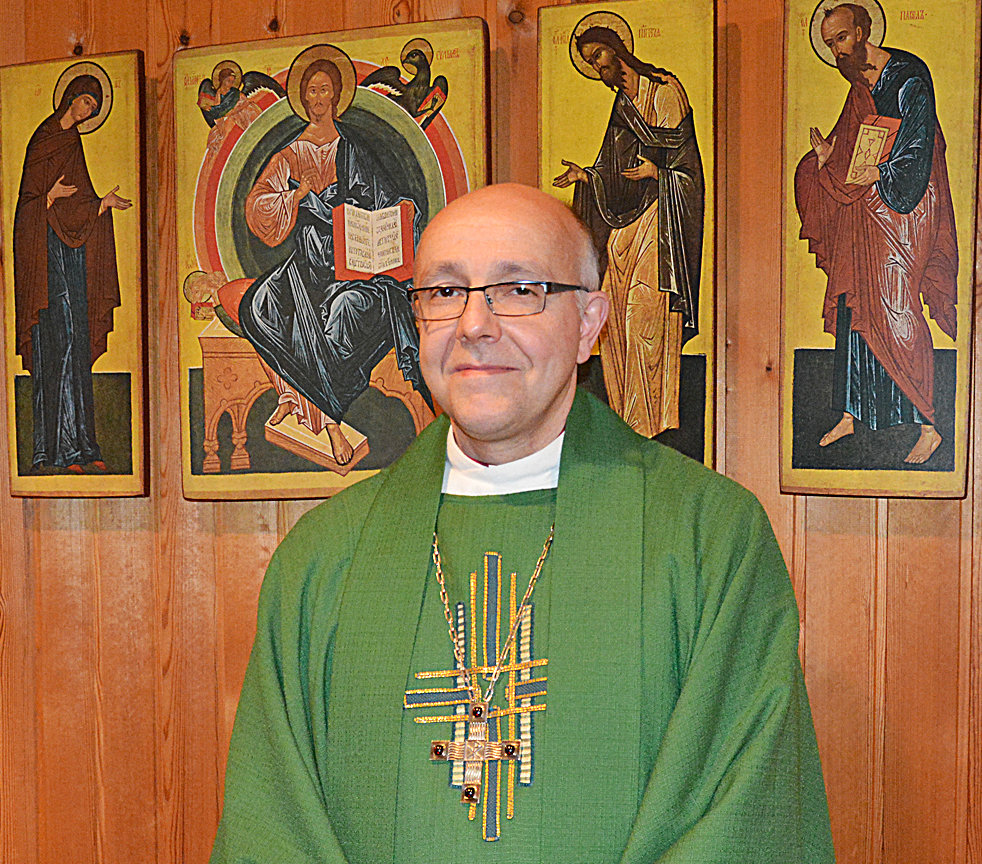
- Church: Independent Evangelical Lutheran Church
- Elected: 11 February 2006
- Other post: Chairman of the International Lutheran Council (since 2012)

Orders
- Ordination: 15 December 1991
- Consecration: 24 June 2006

Personal details
- Born: June 7, 1962 (age 63) Dresden, East Germany
- Spouse: Christiane
- Children: 4

Hans-Jörg Voigt (born Dresden, East Germany, 7 June 1962) is a German Lutheran bishop. He is the bishop of the Independent Evangelical Lutheran Church in Germany. Bishop Voigt is married to Christiane and they have four children.

== Religious career ==
He studied Theology in Leipzig, Berlin and Oberursel. His vicarage was in Cottbus at Holy Cross Lutheran Church between 1989-1991. He witnessed at this time the reunification of Germany. He was ordained a Lutheran minister on 15 December 1991 in Cottbus. His parish was in St. Otto von Bamberg Lutheran Church in Greifswald from 1991 to 2006. Voigt was superintendent (regional bishop) of the Berlin-Brandenburg church district from 2003 to 2006. On 11 February 2006, the synod of the Independent Evangelical Lutheran Church elected him as bishop. The installation divine service was in St. John's Church on 24 June 2006 in Hannover. Since 20 September 2012 Bishop Voigt has been the regular chairman of the International Lutheran Council.

Bishop Voigt works in the editorial of the monthly magazine Lutheran Church.
