= Protes'tant Conference =

Loose association of Lutheran churches and churchworkers in the United States

- Classification: Lutheran
- Orientation: Confessional Lutheran
- Polity: Congregational
- Region: United States
- Origin: 1927; Wisconsin
- Separated from: Wisconsin Evangelical Lutheran Synod
- Congregations: 6
- Members: approx. 1,000 baptized
- Official website: protestantconf.org

The Protes'tant Conference is a loose association of Lutheran churches and churchworkers in the United States. It was organized in 1927 by former members of the Wisconsin Evangelical Lutheran Synod (WELS) who had been suspended following an intrasynodical controversy. At its height, the Protes'tant Conference comprised 22 local congregations, but it had declined to just six by the early 2000s.

It is a conservative, confessional Lutheran Christian group with German immigrant roots. It published the periodical Faith-Life as a conference, and operates the Protes'tant Conference website. It does not consider itself as a denomination or a church body, but a loose association of churchworkers and independent congregations.

== Orthography ==
The organization's name includes a single typewriter quotation mark after the second syllable of the word “Protestant,” indicating that the second syllable is accented.

== History ==
The Protes'tant Conference arose out of a controversy in the WELS over a document known as the Beitz Paper written by then WELS pastor W. F. Beitz in 1926–27. In his paper, Beitz discussed the doctrinal philosophy then prevalent in the synod. Debate arose over the theological nature of the document and about 40 supporters of Beitz were subsequently suspended from the WELS as a result. These pastors, teachers, and some congregations organized into the non-centralized Protes'tant Conference. It has undergone three schisms, in 1930, 1952, and 1964.

Internally, the Protes'tant Conference sometimes referred to itself as The Protes'tant Conference of the Wisconsin Synod. The name "Protes'tant" was adopted in 1929, on the 400th anniversary of the Second Diet of Speyer. That diet of the Holy Roman Empire had outlawed Lutheranism and resulted in the reformers adopting the name "Protestant" . The name "Protes'tant" was chosen to signify their protest against "synodicalism" on the part of both the WELS and the Lutheran Church – Missouri Synod (LCMS). While the LCMS had not been involved in the expulsion of the Protes'tants, its 1927 synod convention ratified the expulsions.

== Core beliefs ==
The Protes'tant Conference teaches that the Bible is the only authoritative and error-free source for doctrine. It subscribes to the Lutheran Confessions (the Book of Concord) because they believe it is an accurate presentation of what Scripture teaches. It teaches that Jesus is the center of Scripture and the only way to eternal salvation, and that the Holy Spirit uses the gospel alone in Word and Sacraments (Baptism and Holy Communion) to bring people to faith in Jesus as Savior and keep them in that faith, strengthening them in their daily life of sanctification.
