= Evangelical Lutheran Conference & Ministerium of North America =

- Abbreviation: ELCM
- Classification: Lutheran
- Region: United States
- Founder: Elling Eielsen
- Origin: 1999; Duncansville, Pennsylvania
- Other name(s): Evangelical Lutheran Church in America
- Official website: www.elcm.org

Evangelical Lutheran Conference & Ministerium of North America (ELCM) is a Lutheran church body based in the U.S. state of Pennsylvania. Currently the ELCM has active congregations in Pennsylvania, New York, and Virginia; as well as mission efforts across the United States. The ELCM has fellowship agreements with Lutheran bodies in Kenya and India. The ELCM sees itself as a centrist confessional Lutheran body. The body was founded in September 1999 at Faith Evangelical Lutheran Church, Duncansville, Pennsylvania. The current president of the ELCM General Conference is Rev. Roy A. Steward.

The next ELCM Triennial General Conference, consisting of lay representatives of ELCM member congregations, and voting member ELCM Pastors, will be held in 2014. The most recent ELCM Triennial General Conference was held July 29 and 30 at Faith Evangelical Lutheran Church, Duncansville, Pennsylvania.

== Today ==
Currently, the ELCM has member congregations in Pennsylvania, New York, and Virginia with Pastors under Mission Development calls in New York, Pennsylvania, Virginia, Georgia, and Minnesota. The ELCM is also a Department of Defense and Department of Veterans' Affairs chaplaincy endorsing agency, and the synod has an active duty U.S. Navy Chaplain.
