= Confessional Evangelical Lutheran Conference =

International church fellowship

- Type: Association
- Classification: Protestant
- Orientation: Lutheran
- Scripture: Bible
- President: Thomas P. Nass
- Origin: 1993
- Official website: www.celc.info

The Confessional Evangelical Lutheran Conference (CELC) is an international fellowship of 34 Confessional Lutheran church bodies.

The CELC was founded in 1993 in Oberwesel, Germany with an initial thirteen church bodies. Plenary sessions are held every three years. To date there have been ten plenary meetings (1993, 1996, 1999, 2002, 2005, 2008, 2011, 2014, 2017, 2021), with regional meetings held in the intervening years.

The CELC rejects the 1999 Joint Declaration on the Doctrine of Justification signed between the Lutheran World Federation and the Catholic Church.

CELC churches have around 400,000 members total.

== History ==
After the decline and dissolution of the Synodical Conference in the 1950s and 1960s, there was renewed interest for fellowship with other Lutheran church bodies. The Rev. Edgar Hoenecke called for a worldwide fellowship of Lutheran church bodies in the late 1960s.

Over the years, many people advocated for an international Lutheran organization and did much to help bring it about. However, three people are noted as having some of the biggest influence in helping to bring about a new international Lutheran organization: Pres. Gerhard Wilde of the Evangelisch-Lutherische Freikirche (ELFK), Pres. George Orvick of the Evangelical Lutheran Synod (ELS), and Prof. Wilbert Gawrisch of the Wisconsin Evangelical Lutheran Synod (WELS).

On April 27–29, 1993, the CELC was formed in Oberwesel, Germany with Lutheran church bodies from Africa, Asia, Australia, Europe, and North America.

Today, the CELC consists of thirty-four Lutheran church bodies worldwide.

== Membership ==
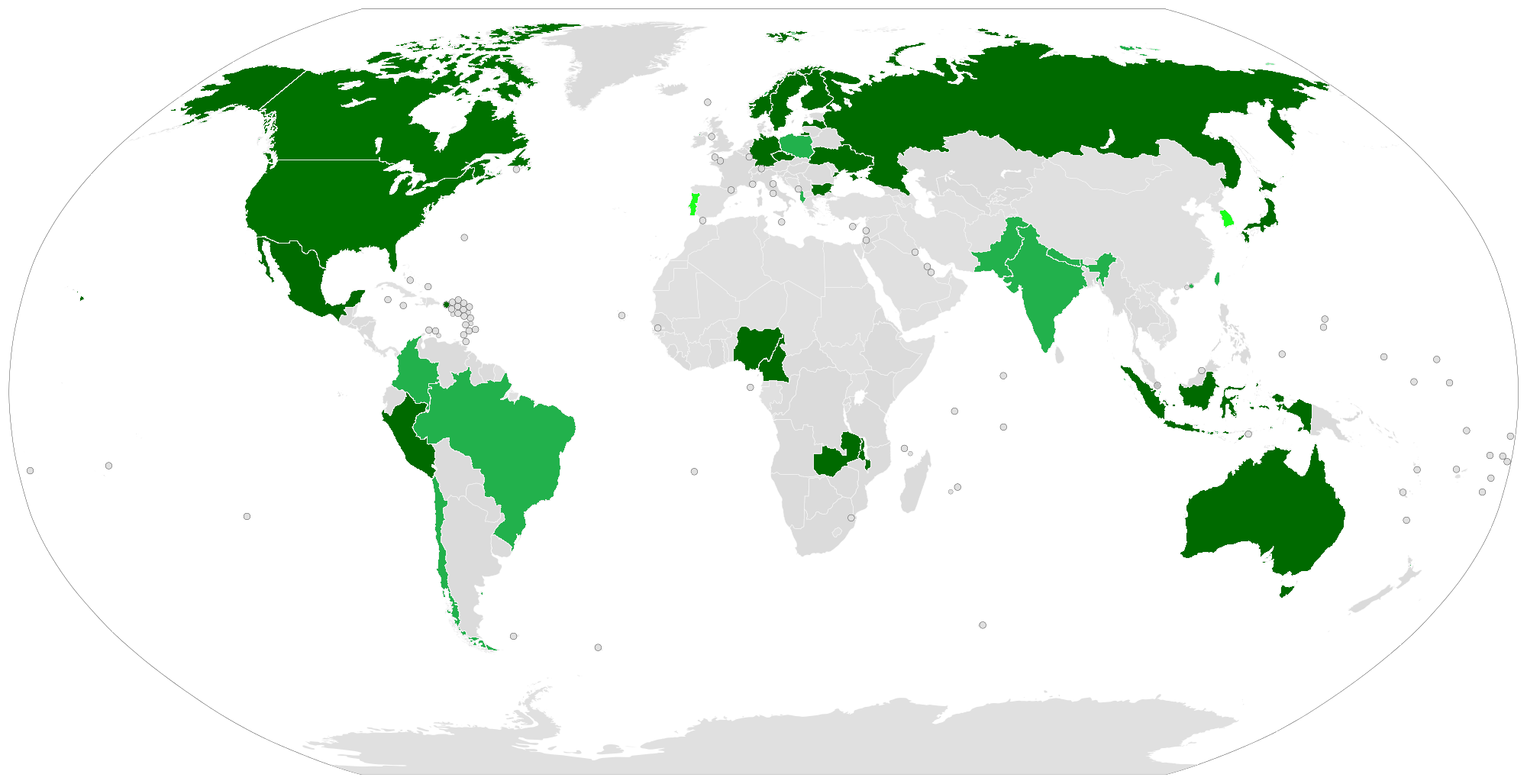
Dark Green - countries with a full member of the CELC; Bright Green - countries with an associate member of the CELC; Light Green - countries with an observer member of the CELC

Member church bodies confess "the canonical books of the Old and New Testament as the verbally inspired and inerrant Word of God and submit to this Word of God as the only infallible rule and authority in all matters of doctrine, faith, and life." They also accept "the Confessions of the Evangelical Lutheran Church contained in the Book of Concord of 1580, not in so far as, but because they are a correct exposition of the pure doctrine of the Word of God."

Members cannot be in fellowship with church bodies whose doctrine or practice deviate from the confessional standard of the CELC. In practice, this means CELC members cannot also be members of the International Lutheran Council (ILC) or the Lutheran World Federation (LWF).

Member church bodies sorted by country/region in alphabetical order:

- Albania

Confessional Evangelical Lutheran Church of Albania

- Australia

Evangelical Lutheran Synod of Australia

- Bulgaria

Bulgarian Lutheran Church

- Cameroon

Lutheran Church of Cameroon

- Canada

WELS-Canada (Part of Wisconsin Evangelical Lutheran Synod)

- Chile

Christian Church of the Lutheran Reformation of Chile

- Czech Republic

Czech Evangelical Lutheran Church

- East Asia

East Asia Lutheran Synod

- Ethiopia

Lutheran Church of Ethiopia

- Finland

The Lutheran Confessional Church of Finland
St. Johannes Evangelical Lutheran Congregation

- Germany

Evangelical Lutheran Free Church

- Hong Kong

South Asian Lutheran Evangelical Mission

- India

Christ Evangelical Lutheran Ministries of India
Lutheran Mission of Salvation—India

- Indonesia

Lutheran Church of Indonesia (Gereja Lutheran Indonesia)

- Japan

Lutheran Evangelical Christian Church

- Kenya

Lutheran Congregations in Mission for Christ—Kenya

- Latvia

Confessional Lutheran Church in Latvia

- Malawi

Lutheran Church of Central Africa

- Mexico

Confessional Evangelical Lutheran Church

- Nigeria

Christ the King Lutheran Church
All Saints Lutheran Church of Nigeria

- Norway

Lutheran Confessional Church

- Peru

Evangelical Lutheran Synod of Peru

- Portugal

Lutheran Church of Portugal

- Puerto Rico

Evangelical Lutheran Confessional Church

- Russia

Evangelical Lutheran Church - "Concord"

- South Korea

Seoul Lutheran Church

- Sweden

Lutheran Confessional Church

- Taiwan

Christ Lutheran Evangelical Church—Taiwan

- Ukraine

Ukrainian Lutheran Church

- United States of America

Evangelical Lutheran Synod
Wisconsin Evangelical Lutheran Synod

- Zambia

Lutheran Church of Central Africa

== Conventions ==
The CELC holds a triennial convention in various countries around the world. The CELC conducts official business at these conventions. Representatives from all CELC member synods attend these conventions. The conventions center around a main doctrinal theme and include worship and Scripture-based essays.

- 1993

Theme: Holy Scripture
Oberwesel, Germany

- 1996

Theme: Justification
Quebradillas, Puerto Rico

- 1999

Theme: The Holy Spirit
Winter Haven, Florida, USA

- 2002

Theme: Christology
Gothenburg, Sweden

- 2005

Theme: The Last Things
Narita, Japan

- 2008

Theme: Evangelism
Kyiv, Ukraine

- 2011

Theme: The Church
New Ulm, Minnesota, USA

- 2014

Theme: Sanctification
Lima, Peru

- 2017

Theme: Reformation- Then and Now
Grimma, Germany

- 2021

The Tenth Triennial Convention
Online conference
