= Independent Lutheran Diocese =

- Orientation: Lutheran
- Region: United States, Canada. UK, South Korea
- Origin: 2005 (as OLCA), renamed to ILD in 2008
- Congregations: 8
- Official website: www.ild.one

The Independent Lutheran Diocese (ILD) is a small Confessional Lutheran group currently headquartered in Klamath Falls, Oregon, United States.

== History ==
The ILD was originally founded in 2005 as the Old Lutheran Church in America (OLCA), being formed by an independent Lutheran pastor and by some members of the Lutheran Church – Missouri Synod members who wanted an alternate route to ordination as a Lutheran pastor. In 2008 OLCA was renamed as the Independent Lutheran Diocese.

The ILD currently consists of eight churches. As of 2022, there were 22 pastors serving in the United States along with three international pastors in Canada, Japan and Australia, with three church bodies in altar and pulpit fellowship in India and Myanmar. Conferences are occasionally held with the clergy.

The ILD publishes books and operates a tuition-free long-distance learning seminary, the Independent Lutheran Seminary.

== Worship ==
The ILD's "Common Liturgy" is nearly identical to the service liturgy found on in The Lutheran Hymnal of 1941 and "Setting 3" of the Lutheran Service Book of 2006. The historic One-Year Lectionary is used in the ILD instead of the post-Vatican II Three-Year Lectionary or Revised Common Lectionary used by most liturgical Protestants in the United States.

== Polity ==
Despite the implications of the denominational name, the ILD practices an episcopal form of governance for the leadership of the association and the congregationalist form for individual congregations, who can make decisions based on their needs. Congregations hold legal title to their church buildings and other property.
