= Evangelical Lutheran Diocese of North America =

Christian denomination in the United States

- Abbreviation: ELDoNA
- Classification: Protestant
- Orientation: Confessional Lutheran
- Structure: Episcopal
- Region: United States
- Congregations: 28
- Official website: eldona.org

The Evangelical Lutheran Diocese of North America (ELDoNA) is a confessional Lutheran church body in the United States. There are nineteen pastors in the diocese, serving congregations in Alaska, Arkansas, Florida, Georgia, Illinois, Michigan, Minnesota, Missouri, Oregon, South Carolina, Tennessee, Texas, and Wisconsin. In addition, the diocese is in fellowship with bodies that serve congregations or missions in Colombia, the Philippines, Singapore, Vietnam, and Australia. The ELDoNA was founded June 6, 2006 at a meeting held at Salem Lutheran Church, Malone, Texas. A second diocesan synod was held August 28 and 29, 2007. The third diocesan synod was held at Christ Lutheran Church in Richmond, Missouri on May 22, 2008, and the fourth in the same location, May 14–15, 2009. For the fifth Colloquium and Synod, the diocese returned to Malone, Texas, May 12–15, 2010, and met there again for the sixth Colloquium and Synod May 11–13, 2011. The sixth Colloquium and Synod was the first in which all but one of the pastors of the diocese and the entire clergy of the Association of Confessional Lutheran Churches (ACLC) were in attendance. Among the significant decisions of the 2011 synod was the resolution to open a diocesan seminary in September 2012; the 2012 synod chose to delay that planned opening to 2014, and the first graduate of that seminary (St. Ignatius Lutheran Theological Seminary) received his degree and was called to serve Christ Lutheran Church in Richmond, Missouri in 2018. The 2012 synod took place at Salem Lutheran Church in Malone, Texas the week of April 23–27, 2012, and the 2013 synod took place April 29–May 3, 2013.

In August 2013 the ACLC broke fellowship with the ELDoNA due to the latter's stand on the doctrine of Objective Justification.

In 2006, James Heiser was called to serve as the diocesan bishop. Heiser has published a volume of essays on the doctrine of the holy ministry entitled Stewards of the Mysteries of God. He is also the author of a study of the neo-Platonic revival which took place during the Italian Renaissance, entitled Prisci Theologi and the Hermetic Reformation in the Fifteenth Century.

In 2013, Repristination Press published a volume of essays by Pastor John Rutowicz which sets forth the diocesan understanding of the episcopal office: Holding Fast the Faithful Word: Episcopacy and the Office of the Holy Ministry in the Evangelical Lutheran Diocese of North America.

The diocese produces The Lutheran Herald, a monthly devotional journal that also includes diocesan news.
