= Confessional Lutheranism =

Lutherans who accept the doctrines taught in the Book of Concord

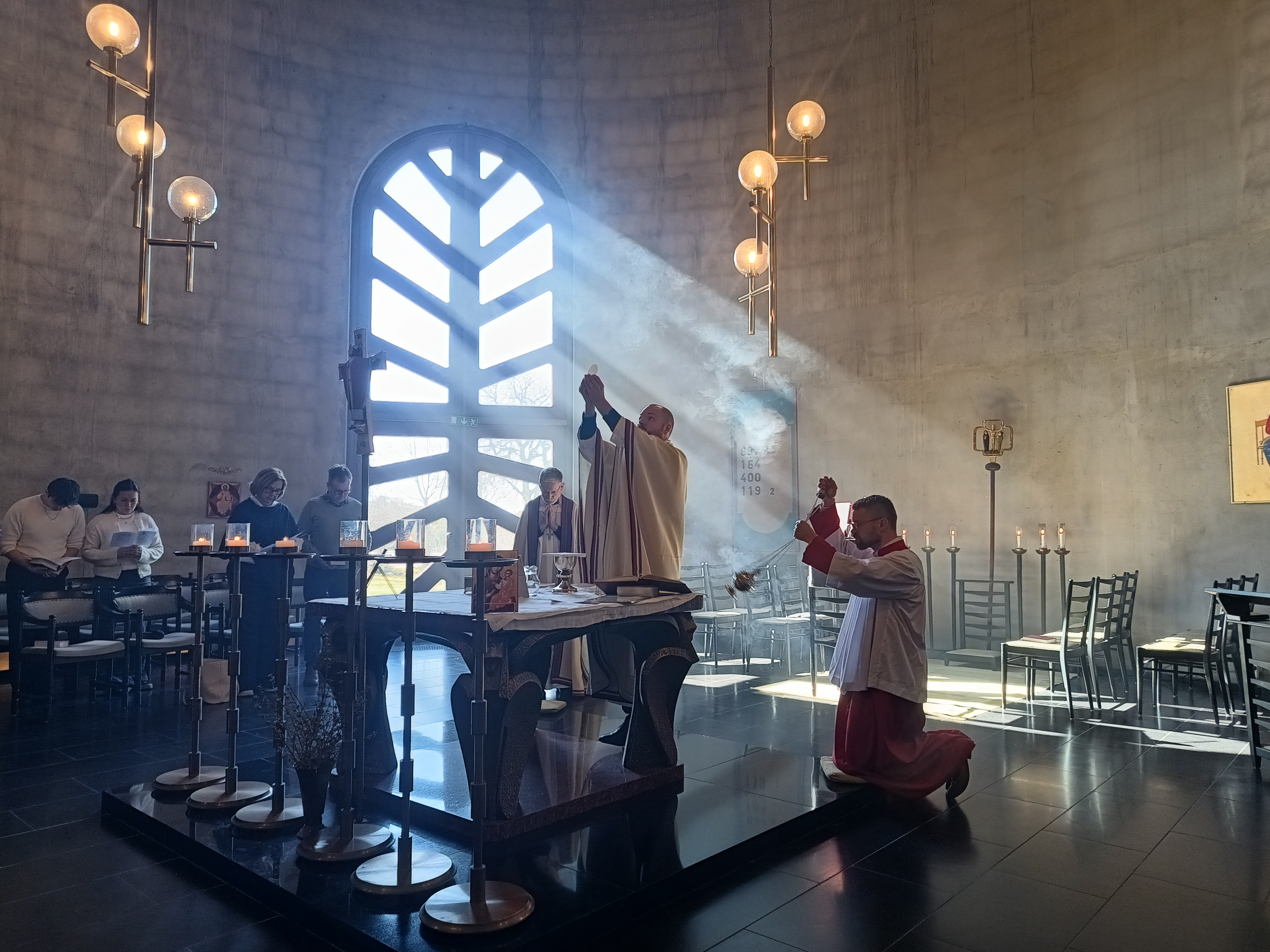
A priest elevates the host during the Holy Mass, offered in the Chapel of Heavenly Joy in Kristianstad; the Chapel of Heavenly Joy (Himmelska glädjens kapell) is a part of the Mission Province, a Confessional Lutheran denomination in Sweden.

Confessional Lutheranism or Confessional Evangelical-Lutheranism is a name used by Lutherans to designate those who believe in the doctrines taught in the Book of Concord of 1580 (the Lutheran confessional documents) in their entirety. Confessional Lutherans maintain that faithfulness to the Book of Concord, which is a summary of the teachings found in Christian scripture, requires attention to how that faith is actually being preached, taught, and put into practice. Confessional Lutherans believe that this is a vital part of their identity as Lutherans.

The term "Confessional Lutheran" is generally used among more conservative churches found in organizations like the International Lutheran Council (ILC), Confessional Evangelical Lutheran Conference (CELC), and the Global Confessional and Missional Lutheran Forum, though other Confessional Lutheran denominations are independent of the same. Confessional denominations subscribe to the Book of Concord because (quia) it agrees with the Bible. In contrast, churches of the larger Lutheran World Federation subscribe to the Book of Concord as an exposition of faith insofar as (quatenus) it agrees with the Christian Bible.

== History ==
Two main confessional movements arose during the 19th century: the Old Lutherans and the Neo-Lutherans. The Old Lutherans originated from the Schism of the Old Lutherans, while Neo-Lutheranism arose in Germany in the 1830s from the Pietist-driven Erweckung ("Awakening"). Neo-Lutheranism itself contained differing camps. It gave rise later to those calling themselves confessional Lutherans.

Neo-Lutheranism developed in reaction to Pietism on the one side and Rationalism on the other, both of which had arisen in the previous century. German clergymen such as Martin Stephan, C. F. W. Walther, F. C. D. Wyneken, and Wilhelm Loehe became a part of the movement as they studied the works of Martin Luther and the Book of Concord.

The Old Lutheran and Neo-Lutheran movements spread to the United States with the Neo-Lutheran Loehe and the Old Lutheran free church leader Friedrich August Brünn, both sending missionaries to newly arrived German immigrants in the Midwest, and with the immigration of groups including the Saxons who settled in Missouri under Stephan and Walther, the Germans who settled in Indiana under Wyneken, and the Prussians under J. A. A. Grabau in Western New York and southeastern Wisconsin (the Buffalo Synod).

In Scandinavia, where High Church Lutheranism and Pietist Lutheranism has been highly influential, the Evangelical Lutheran Mission Diocese of Finland, Mission Province of the Church of Sweden, and the Evangelical Lutheran Diocese of Norway entered into schism with their national churches due to "the secularization of the national/state churches in their respective countries involving matters of both Christian doctrine and ethics"; these are members of the International Lutheran Council with their bishops having secured their lines of apostolic succession from other traditional Lutheran Churches, such as the Evangelical Lutheran Church in Kenya.

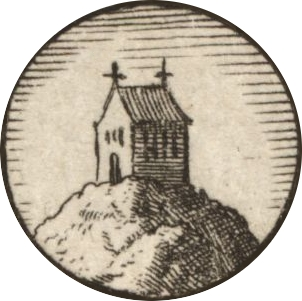
...one holy Church is to continue forever. The Church is the congregation of saints, in which the Gospel is rightly taught and the Sacraments are rightly administered.—Augsburg Confession

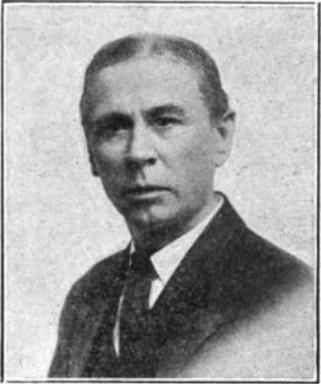
Franz Pieper (1852–1931) taught the importance of a quia subscription

== Church bodies using the title "confessional" ==
Contemporary Lutheran church bodies that identify themselves as confessional tend to be either members of the International Lutheran Council, the Confessional Evangelical Lutheran Conference, the Global Confessional and Missional Lutheran Forum, or certain other independent Lutheran bodies. Among the members of the ILC are the Lutheran Church – Missouri Synod, the Lutheran Church–Canada, the Independent Evangelical-Lutheran Church of Germany, the Lutheran Church of Australia, and the Evangelical Lutheran Church of Brazil. Among the CELC are the Wisconsin Evangelical Lutheran Synod and the Evangelical Lutheran Synod. Other confessional Lutherans include the Church of the Lutheran Confession, the American Association of Lutheran Churches, the Concordia Lutheran Conference, the Evangelical Lutheran Diocese of North America, member congregations of the Protes'tant Conference, and member congregations of the Orthodox Lutheran Confessional Conference of Independent Congregations, the United Lutheran Mission Association, and the Evangelical Lutheran Conference & Ministerium of North America (all of North America).

In the Nordic countries, members of the Communion of Nordic Lutheran Dioceses are a part of the International Lutheran Council: these include the Evangelical Lutheran Mission Diocese of Finland, the Mission Province of the Church of Sweden, and the Evangelical Lutheran Diocese of Norway. These dioceses entered into schism with the Evangelical Lutheran Church of Finland, Church of Sweden, and Church of Norway, respectively, due to "the secularization of the national/state churches in their respective countries involving matters of both Christian doctrine and ethics". Apostolic succession of the Mission Province is derived from Walter Obare Omwanza, the presiding bishop of the Evangelical Lutheran Church in Kenya, who, assisted by bishops Leonid Zviki from Belarus, David Tswaedi from South Africa, and Børre Knudsen and Ulf Asp from Norway, consecrated Arne Olsson as bishop of the diocese. The Concordia Lutheran Church and the Evangelical Lutheran Church in Sweden are other bodies that identify as Confessional Lutherans in the region of Scandinavia.

The Lutheran Church - International, which has an Evangelical Catholic churchmanship, describes itself as adhering to Confessional Lutheranism as it holds that it "preaches, teaches, and confesses the Gospel of Jesus Christ as faithfully witnessed by the Augsburg Confession of 1530 and the Book of Concord."

Additionally, the Association of Free Lutheran Congregations (AFLC) describes themselves as confessional. The autonomous congregations within the AFLC are only required to officially subscribe to the unaltered Augsburg Confession and Luther's Small Catechism, but many member congregations officially subscribe to more, or all, of the Book of Concord, while others do so unofficially in matters of doctrine and practice. All internally trained AFLC pastors are taught a quia subscription of the Book of Concord, leaving the denomination as a whole "unofficially" confessional in matters of preaching and teaching.

Though there are some congregations in the Evangelical Lutheran Church in America which would call themselves "confessional", many of those congregations have decided to leave the ELCA due to the liberal leanings of the denomination, most notably their stances expressed in the 2009 ELCA convention. The ELCA as a whole does not use the title "confessional" to describe itself, but it and the other member churches of the Lutheran World Federation do ascribe to the unaltered Augsburg Confession and the other confessional documents in the Book of Concord as true interpretations of the Christian faith. Additionally, the Evangelical Church of the Lutheran Confession in Brazil uses the title "confessional" on its name, but it instead has a "Quatenus" subscription to the Book of Concord and it is a member of the Lutheran World Federation.

== "Quia" versus "Quatenus" subscription ==
Lutheran church bodies and Lutheran individuals that identify themselves as confessional generally hold to a "quia" (Latin for "because") rather than a "quatenus" (Latin for "insofar as") subscription to the Book of Concord, which contains the Apostles' Creed, Nicene Creed, Athanasian Creed, Luther's Small Catechism, Luther's Large Catechism, the Augsburg Confession, the Apology of the Augsburg Confession, the Smalcald Articles, the Treatise on the Power and Primacy of the Pope, and the Formula of Concord.

Quia subscription (the Book of Concord is adhered to because it is faithful to the Scriptures) implies that the subscriber believes that there is no contradiction between the Book of Concord and the Scriptures. Quatenus subscription (the Book of Concord is adhered to insofar as it is faithful to the Scriptures) implies that the subscriber leaves room for the possibility that there might be a contradiction of the Scriptures in the Book of Concord in which case the subscriber may hold to the Scriptures against the Book of Concord. Confessional Lutheran bodies, e.g. The LCMS, maintain that this distinguishes them from other ("mainline") Lutheran bodies and Lutherans, who, they believe, hold to a quatenus subscription.

C. F. W. Walther explained the meaning of confessional subscription:

An unconditional subscription is the solemn declaration which the individual who wants to serve the church makes under oath (1) that he accepts the doctrinal content of our Lutheran Confessions, because he recognizes the fact that they are in full agreement with Scripture and do not militate against Scripture in any point, whether the point be of major or minor importance; and (2) that he therefore heartily believes in this divine truth and is determined to preach this doctrine.

== Views on the Antichrist ==
Confessional Lutherans, including the Lutheran Church – Missouri Synod, Wisconsin Evangelical Lutheran Synod, Evangelical Lutheran Synod, and Church of the Lutheran Confession officially teach that the Papacy of the Catholic Church represents the office of the Antichrist, insofar as it exalts itself against the Gospel by claiming divine authority in the Church. The Lutheran Church – Missouri Synod affirms that "Antichrist" refers to the office, and not to the person, while the Wisconsin Evangelical Lutheran Synod states that the reference is to the office, but not to the exclusion of the current office holder:

There are two principles that mark the papacy as the Antichrist. One is that the pope takes to himself the right to rule the church that belongs only to Christ. He can make laws forbidding the marriage of priests, eating or not eating meat on Friday, birth control, divorce and remarriage, even where there are not such laws in the Bible. The second is that he teaches that salvation is not by faith alone but by faith and works. The present pope upholds and practices these principles. This marks his rule as antichristian rule in the church. All popes hold the same office over the church and promote the same antichristian belief so they all are part of the reign of the Antichrist. The Bible does not present the Antichrist as one man for one short time, but as an office held by a man through successive generations. It is a title like King of England.

== See also ==
- Evangelical Lutheran Free Church (UAC)
- Lutheran Confessional Synod
- Lutheran Orthodoxy
