= Wisconsin Evangelical Lutheran Synod =

Lutheran Christian denomination in the US

- Classification: Lutheran
- Orientation: Confessional Lutheran
- Scripture: Bible
- Polity: Congregational
- Associations: Confessional Evangelical Lutheran Conference, Formerly Synodical Conference (1869–1963) and General Council (1867–1869)
- Region: United States and 24 other countries.
- Headquarters: Waukesha, Wisconsin, U.S.
- Origin: 1850; Milwaukee, Wisconsin, U.S.
- Separated from: German mission societies (1868)
- Merger of: Wisconsin, Minnesota, Michigan, and Nebraska synods
- Separations: Protes'tant Conference (1927); Church of the Lutheran Confession (1960)
- Congregations: 1,250
- Members: 340,511 baptized 272,555 communicant
- Primary schools: 284
- Secondary schools: 29
- Official website: www.wels.net

The Wisconsin Evangelical Lutheran Synod (WELS), also referred to simply as the Wisconsin Synod, is an American Confessional Lutheran denomination of Christianity. Characterized as theologically conservative, it was founded in 1850 in Milwaukee, Wisconsin.

As of 2022, it had a baptized membership of 340,511 in 1,250 congregations (churches) located in 47 US states and 4 provinces of Canada. The WELS also does gospel outreach in 40 countries around the world through missions. It is the third, or fourth, largest Lutheran denomination in the United States. The WELS school system is the fourth largest private school system in the United States.

The WELS is in fellowship with the Evangelical Lutheran Synod (ELS) and is a member of the Confessional Evangelical Lutheran Conference (CELC), a worldwide organization of Lutheran church bodies of the same beliefs.

== Belief and practice ==
=== Doctrinal standards ===
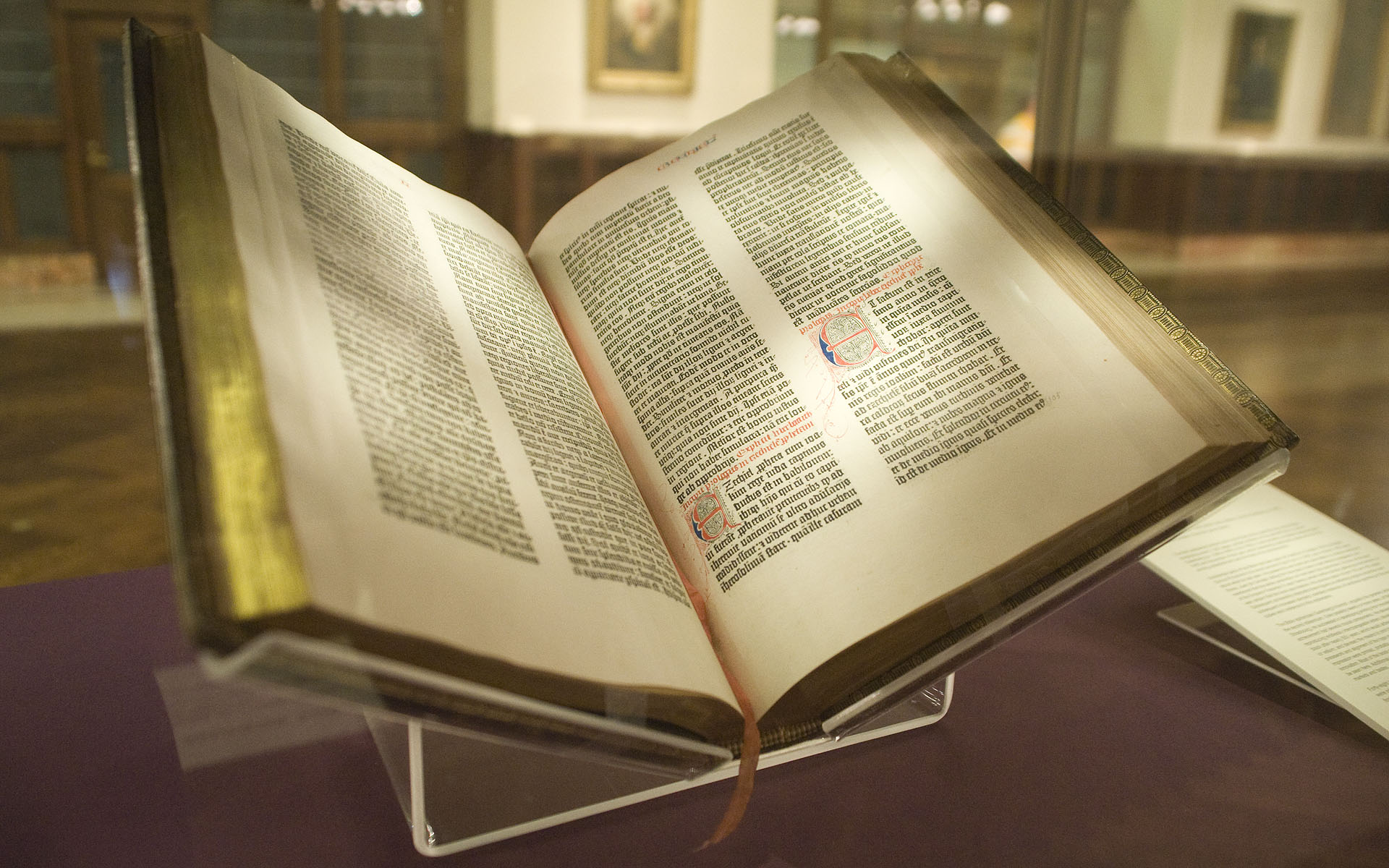
The WELS holds to the belief of "Sola scriptura" ("by Scripture alone").

The WELS subscribes to the Lutheran Reformation teaching of Sola scriptura—"by Scripture alone". It holds that the Bible is the final authority by which church teachings can be judged. The WELS holds to a quia subscription to the 16th century Lutheran Confessions; that is, they teach that the confessions are valid because they are faithful to the Bible. As such, WELS pastors agree to teach in accordance with it.

The WELS also agrees with the doctrine of Biblical inerrancy, the doctrine that the Bible is inspired by God and is without error (2 Timothy 3:16, 2 Peter 1:20-21, 1 Corinthians 2:13, John 17:17, Psalm 12:6, Titus 1:2). For this reason, they reject much of modern liberal theology.

=== Differences from Lutheran Church – Missouri Synod ===
The main facets of doctrinal difference between the WELS and the Lutheran Church – Missouri Synod (LCMS) include:

- Fellowship – The WELS teaches that all forms of Christian fellowship require a complete unity in matters of doctrine (Romans 16:17, Ephesians 4:3-6). The LCMS, meanwhile, teaches that there are different levels of fellowship among Christians, so that altar fellowship (sharing in the Eucharist together), pulpit fellowship (exchange of preaching privileges among ministers of various congregations), and other manifestations of Christian fellowship (such as fellowship in prayer), are distinct. Thus, according to LCMS doctrine, members of different church bodies can engage in greater or lesser degrees of fellowship depending on the extent of their doctrinal disagreement.
- Doctrine of the ministry – The WELS believes that there are many different forms of one, divinely established Ministry. These forms of the Ministry include pastor, Christian day-school teacher, and others (1 Corinthians 12:28, Ephesians 4:11). The LCMS teaches that only the pastoral office is divinely established, while all other church offices are human institutions.
- Role of women in the church – The LCMS and WELS agree that Scriptures reserve the pastoral office for men. In "This We Believe", published in 1999, WELS states that "women may participate in offices and activities of the public ministry except where that work involves authority over men (1 Timothy 2:11,12). This means that women may not serve as pastors nor participate in assemblies of the church in ways that exercise authority over men (1 Corinthians 11:3; 14:33–35)." WELS does not allow women suffrage in congregational matters that would exercise authority over men. LCMS teaches that women may take on roles of lay authority in the church, such as voting in church elections and serving in "humanly established offices" such as congregation president, reader, or member of church councils, including elected executive roles in the church.

=== Differences from the Evangelical Lutheran Church in America ===
- Scriptural interpretation – The WELS confesses that the Bible is the inspired, inerrant and infallible Word of God (2 Timothy 3:16, 2 Peter 1:20-21, 1 Corinthians 2:13, John 17:17, Psalm 12:6, Titus 1:2) and follows a historical-grammatical approach to interpretation. The meaning of a portion of Scripture is discerned by paying careful attention to grammar, syntax, vocabulary and context. In this regard, the historical setting forms part of the context of Scripture, the text itself indicating how important a part. The Evangelical Lutheran Church in America (ELCA), on the other hand, has been open to historical-critical methods of Biblical interpretation which seek to understand the scriptures with primary reference to historical and social context. Most other specific doctrinal differences between the two churches stem from this overarching disagreement.
- Creation – The WELS teaches that the account of creation given in Genesis 1–3 is a factual, historical account, while the ELCA has not enforced an official position, allowing members to embrace positions ranging from strict creationism to theistic evolution.
- Sexuality – The WELS teaches that extramarital sex (1 Corinthians 7:2, Hebrews 13:4) and homosexual relations (Romans 1:18-32, 1 Corinthians 6:9-11, 1 Timothy 8-11) are sins, while the ELCA and its predecessor churches are open to multiple viewpoints on these matters.
- Fellowship – The WELS teaches that churches must agree on all doctrines of Scripture before they can enjoy any form of fellowship with each other (Romans 16:17, Ephesians 4:3-6), while the ELCA teaches that agreement on all aspects of doctrine is not necessarily required as a prerequisite for fellowship. It thus practices fellowship with a handful of other mainline Protestant denominations.
- Role of women in the church – The WELS holds that, according to Scripture, women may not serve as clergy nor vote within their congregations where authority is exercised over men (see above), while the ELCA's three predecessor churches began ordaining women into the ministry in the 1970s, according to their interpretation of Scripture.
- Communion – The WELS practices closed communion (1 Corinthians 10:16-17, 1 Corinthians 1:10, 1 Corinthians 11:26-32); it holds that the Eucharist is reserved for confirmed members of the WELS, any sister church in fellowship with WELS, and other individuals found upon examination to be in doctrinal agreement with the WELS.

== History ==
=== Beginning ===
The WELS's direct predecessor, known as the German Evangelical Ministerium of Wisconsin, was founded in 1850 by several churches in and around Milwaukee, Wisconsin. Many of the early pastors were educated and trained by mission societies in Germany. The early churches in the Wisconsin Synod had a strong German background; services and church business were conducted in German. Many of the pastors and congregations brought with them a tolerance towards forming joint congregations with the Reformed, similar to the Union Churches they had left behind in Germany. In 1864, the German Evangelical Lutheran synod of Wisconsin was incorporated by an act of the state legislature.

=== General Council ===
In the 1860s, the Wisconsin Synod became increasingly conservative along the Lutheran viewpoint and against the Reformed. In the synod convention of 1867, the synod joined the General Council, a group of Neo-Lutheran synods that had left the General Synod because the latter body sought to compromise Lutheran doctrine in order to join with non-Lutheran American Protestantism. However, some pastors in the Wisconsin Synod agreed with the "open questions" position of the Iowa Synod that some doctrines could be left unresolved and good Lutherans could agree to disagree about them.

The 1868 convention witnessed a meaningful discussion on the topic of pulpit and altar fellowship, one of the Four Points in American Lutheranism. Although there were several dissenting opinions, most of the pastors and lay delegates realized that they could not in good conscience exchange pastors with non-Lutherans or invite them to commune at their altar. They felt that the position the General Council took on this subject was inadequate. They resolved that, unless it changed course, they would withdraw from the General Council.

=== Synodical Conference ===
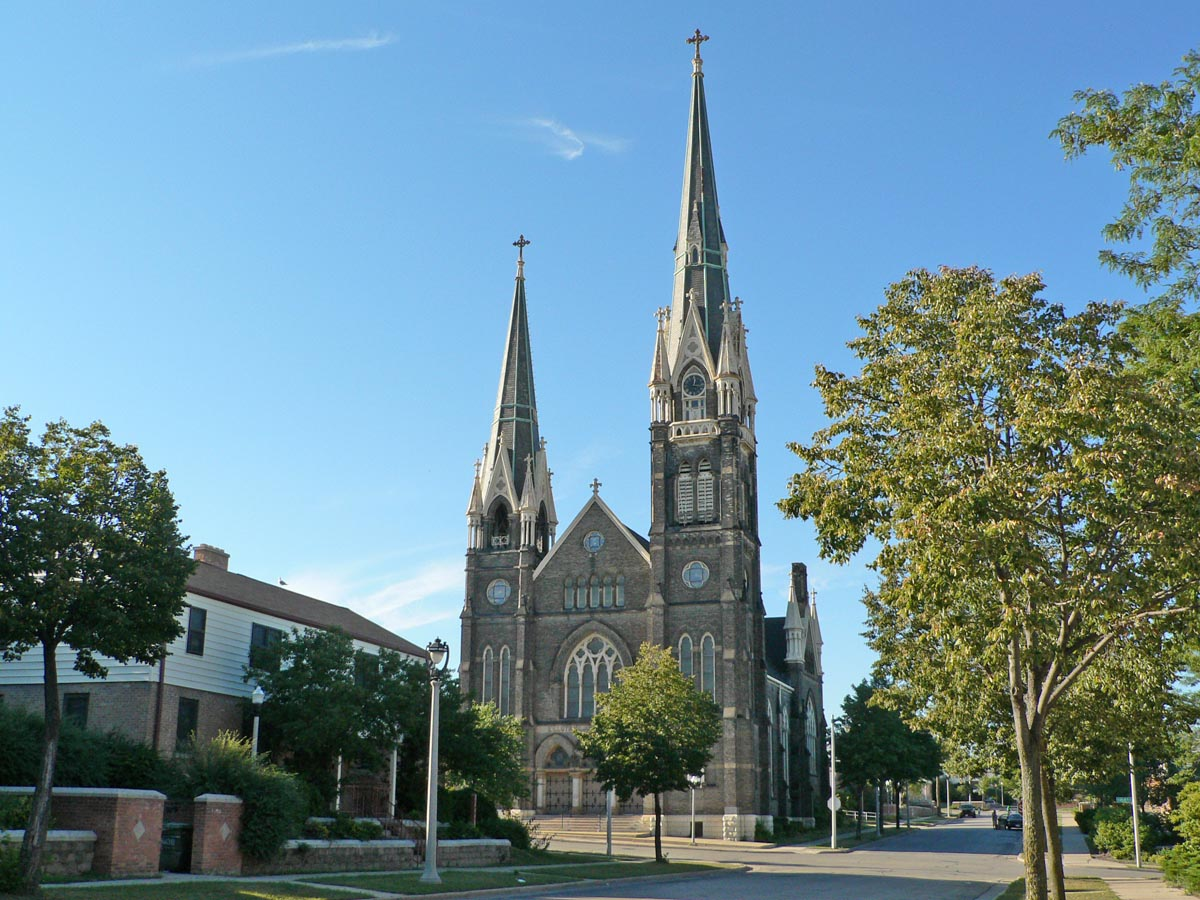
The Synodical Conference was founded in St. John's Evangelical Lutheran Church in Milwaukee, Wisconsin.

Following the 1868 convention, representatives of the Wisconsin and Missouri Synods held a meeting in Milwaukee during October 21–22, 1868. They discussed various points of doctrine, writing an agreement recognizing the Missouri and Wisconsin synods as orthodox Lutheran church bodies and that they have fellowship. The agreement noted that in the event a doctrinal error arose in one of the two synods, they would not question each other's orthodoxy as long as they both used all Christian means at their disposal to resolve the problem. This agreement was later adopted by each of the synods in convention.

The Ohio Synod invited the Wisconsin Synod, Illinois Synod, Missouri Synod, and Norwegian Synod, to Chicago on January 11–13, 1871. There the synods drew up a document of association for the synods to vote on at their next convention. They also invited the entire membership, both teachers and pastors, of all the synods to attend a general convention the next year. This first meeting of the Evangelical Lutheran Synodical Conference of North America, commonly called the "Synodical Conference", was held in Milwaukee, Wisconsin on July 10–16, 1872. They wrote the constitution to the Synodical Conference, which arranged the synods together as a federation and did not vest any real authority with the Synodical Conference, either at the convention or board level. The fellowship union included full communion among members, the sharing of educational facilities, joint mission and benevolence work, and open pulpit between pastors of the different synods.

==== Reorganization ====
The first convention of the Synodical Conference also endeavored to reduce the severe competition between synods. The delegates planned to reorganize all Synodical Conference Lutherans into separate state synods, although allowing for separate organization along the lines of the three languages—German, Norwegian, and English. The 1876 and 1877 conventions also took up this cause, and added to it the goal of providing centrally located ministerial and teacher education campuses. The Minnesota Synod favored the approach of organizing state synods, but only if they would be independent of the larger Ohio and Missouri Synods. Likewise, the Wisconsin Synod desired organization along state lines, but only on the condition that they would be prohibited from joining any larger synodical body, that is, the already existing Ohio and Missouri Synods. The Wisconsin Synod also did not think that it could derive any benefit out of a centrally run seminary. In response to this strained relation between the Wisconsin Synod and the other synods, the Synodical Conference elected a committee made up of Wisconsin Synod delegates and other synods' representatives to repair relations with the Wisconsin Synod in time for the next convention in 1878.

In 1878, the Wisconsin Synod withdrew its demand that the state synods had to be independent of the Missouri or Ohio Synods. The Missouri Synod needed to build a new seminary, since facilities at its current campus were strained. Although there were considerable plans to build a new joint Synodical Conference seminary near Chicago, because of the hesitance of the Wisconsin Synod on this subject and the inability of any of the other members besides Missouri to contribute financially to the new project, it was tabled, and ultimately never happened.

The 1878 convention voted in favor of establishing state synods. These state synods were to organize into two or three larger synods, one for the east (corresponding to the Ohio Synod), one for the southwest (corresponding to the Missouri Synod), and one for the northwest (which would include all congregations in Michigan, Wisconsin, Minnesota, the Dakotas and all parts west). This formed three larger synods, which solved the longstanding concern that if either the Missouri or Ohio synods were allowed to keep their identity, they would dominate the rest of the Synodical Conference, or, even worse, the Minnesota or Wisconsin Synods would be forced to join one of them. This new organization did not apply to congregations speaking Norwegian, and English speaking congregations were to organize as separate district synods within one of the larger synods.

==== Schism ====
The Synodical Conference split when the Ohio Synod left the Synodical Conference in 1881 over the issue of whether God predestined people according to his foreknowledge of whether they would come to faith. The Ohio Synod had some pastors that allowed for this position, while the Missouri Synod declared it to be false doctrine. This Election Controversy had been introduced by a German professor in the Norwegian Synod, Friedrich A. Schmidt. The Norwegian Synod left the Synodical Conference in 1883, attempting to keep the disunity they experienced within their synod from creeping into the Synodical Conference. Meanwhile, the Wisconsin and Missouri synods stood together in cooperation and harmony during this period of fierce debate.

=== Bennett Law ===
Along with other ethnically German denominations, the Wisconsin Synod successfully spoke out in opposition to the Wisconsin Bennett Law, a compulsory education law that also required certain subjects be taught in English and put public authorities in charge of enforcing compliance in both public and private schools. Wisconsin's German-American Lutherans and Catholics saw the law as an attack on their parochial schools and parental rights. They also believed the law was a nativist attack on their German culture. The law was enacted in 1889 and repealed in 1891.

=== Apache mission ===
Rev. Paul Mayerhoff lived in this tent for six months in 1896 at the beginning of his Call as a Wisconsin Synod missionary to the Apache. He catechized children, learned their language, and translated parts of Luther's Small Catechism into Apache.

In 1893, two Wisconsin Synod missionaries began work in Arizona at Peridot and Old San Carlos in the San Carlos Apache Indian Reservation among the Apache people. Congregations were soon established. Currently there are nine Wisconsin Synod congregations on the reservation.

=== 1917 merger ===
In 1892, the Wisconsin Synod had federated with the Michigan and Minnesota synods to form the General Evangelical Lutheran Synod of Wisconsin, Minnesota, Michigan and Other States. The Nebraska Synod joined the federation in 1904. In 1917 the synods voted to turn their federation into a formal union, known as the Evangelical Lutheran Joint Synod of Wisconsin and Other States. By 1930, the merger and other factors had pushed the Wisconsin Synod to become a primarily English-speaking synod. The present name was adopted in 1959.

=== Protes'tant controversy ===
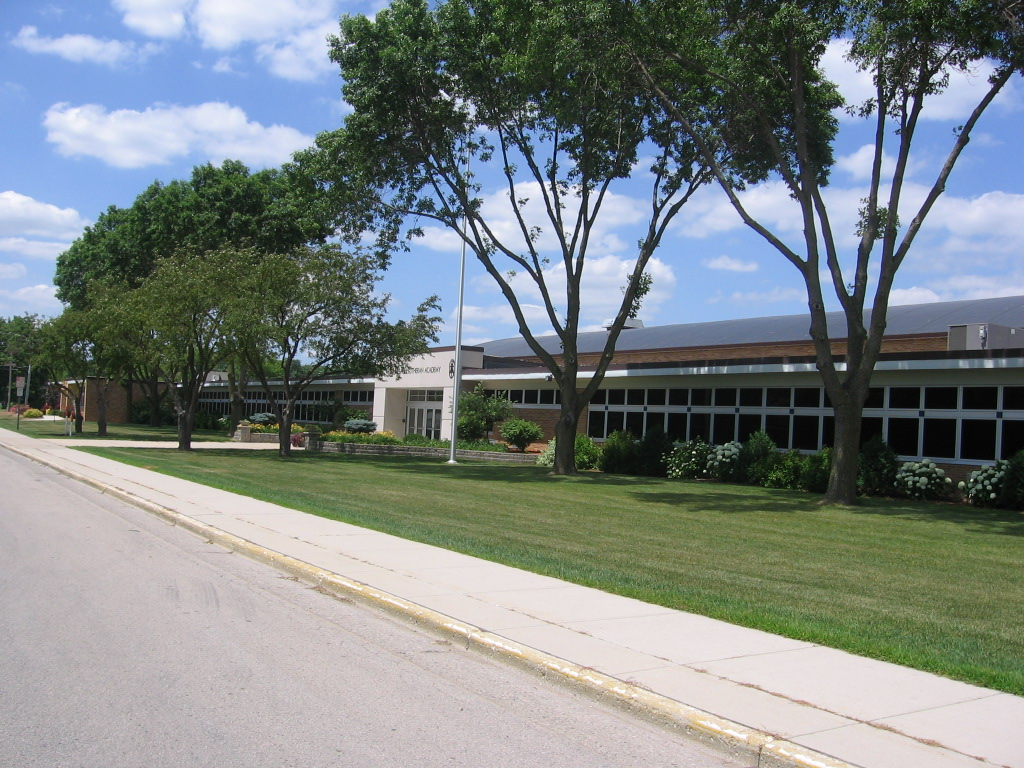
Winnebago Lutheran Academy, a WELS high school in Fond du Lac, Wisconsin, was founded in 1926.

From 1926 to 1929, a small group of persons and congregations were expelled or voluntarily left the WELS in an incident known as the "Protes'tant Controversy". They formed the Protes'tant Conference.

=== Breakup of the Synodical Conference ===
Doctrinal differences among the synods of the Synodical Conference, especially concerning the doctrine and practice of church fellowship, surfaced during the 1940s and '50s. Problems began when the LCMS began exploratory talks with leaders of the American Lutheran Church (ALC). The ALC differed on its doctrine of Predestination and therefore did not share doctrinal fellowship with the Synodical Conference. Since there had been no recent change on the ALC's doctrinal position, the LCMS was then charged by some within the Synodical Conference of changing its position on church fellowship. After years of continued talks, the ELS severed its fellowship relations with the LCMS in 1955 and withdrew from the Synodical Conference. Two years later the WELS publicly recognized the same doctrinal disagreements with the LCMS, but rather than break fellowship, decided to admonish the LCMS to return to its former practice.

Dissatisfaction over this decision led about 70 pastors and a similar number of congregations to leave the WELS, ELS, and LCMS to form the Church of the Lutheran Confession (CLC). Their chief complaint was that the WELS misapplied the principles of Christian fellowship by not breaking immediately with the Synodical Conference and the LCMS after it had publicly recognized doctrinal disagreements. While the WELS broke fellowship with the LCMS in 1961, the CLC and the WELS remain at odds regarding this issue to this day. Recently, the WELS and ELS have been in formal discussions with the CLC over doctrinal issues. The goal of these discussions is to restore fellowship with each other.

=== Confessional Evangelical Lutheran Conference ===
In 1993, the ELS and WELS, working with a number of other Lutheran synods around the world—some of which had been founded through mission work by both synods—founded a new international fellowship organization which is the theological successor of the Synodical Conference: the Confessional Evangelical Lutheran Conference (CELC).

=== Martin Luther College ===
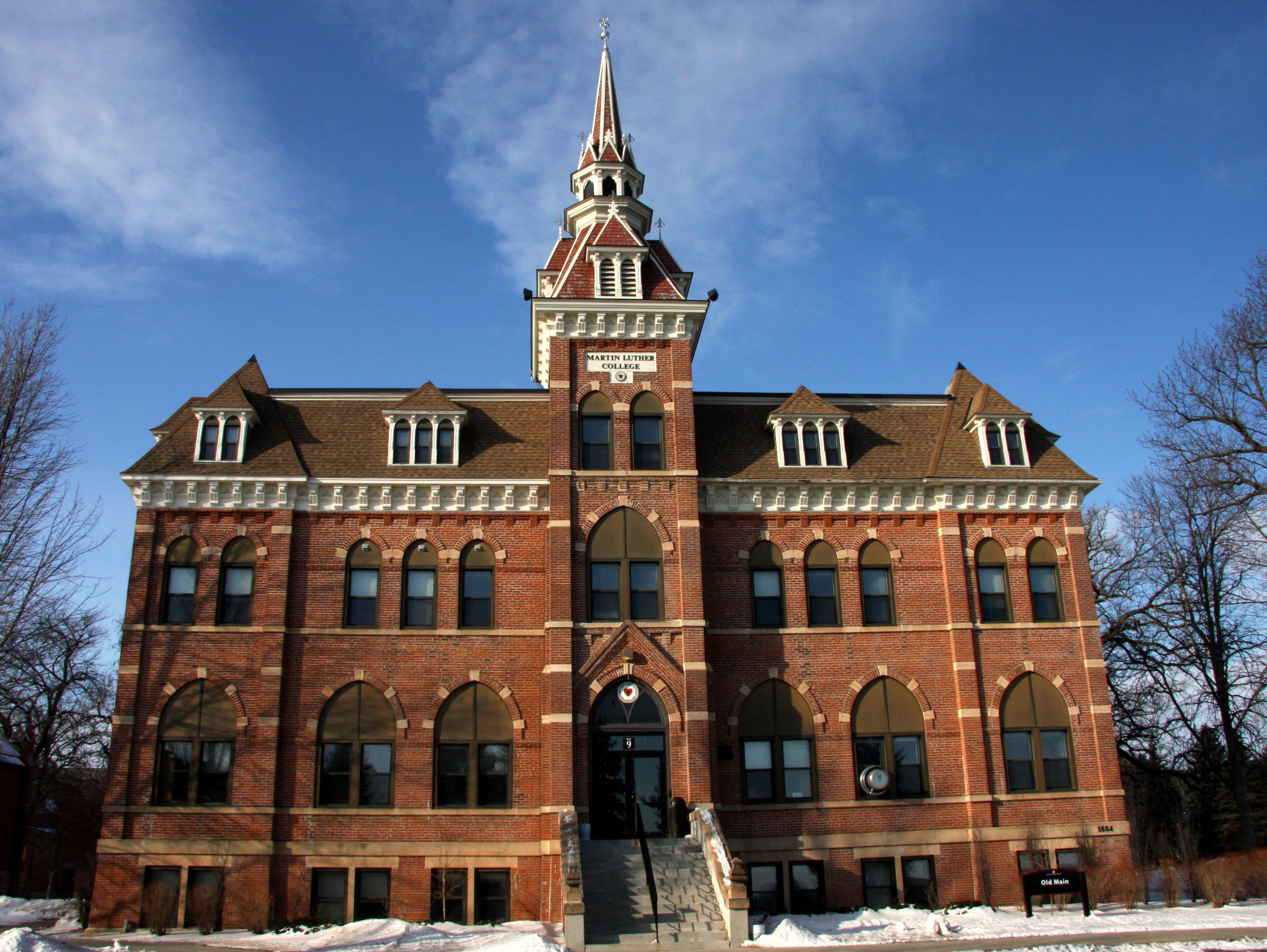
Martin Luther College in New Ulm, Minnesota

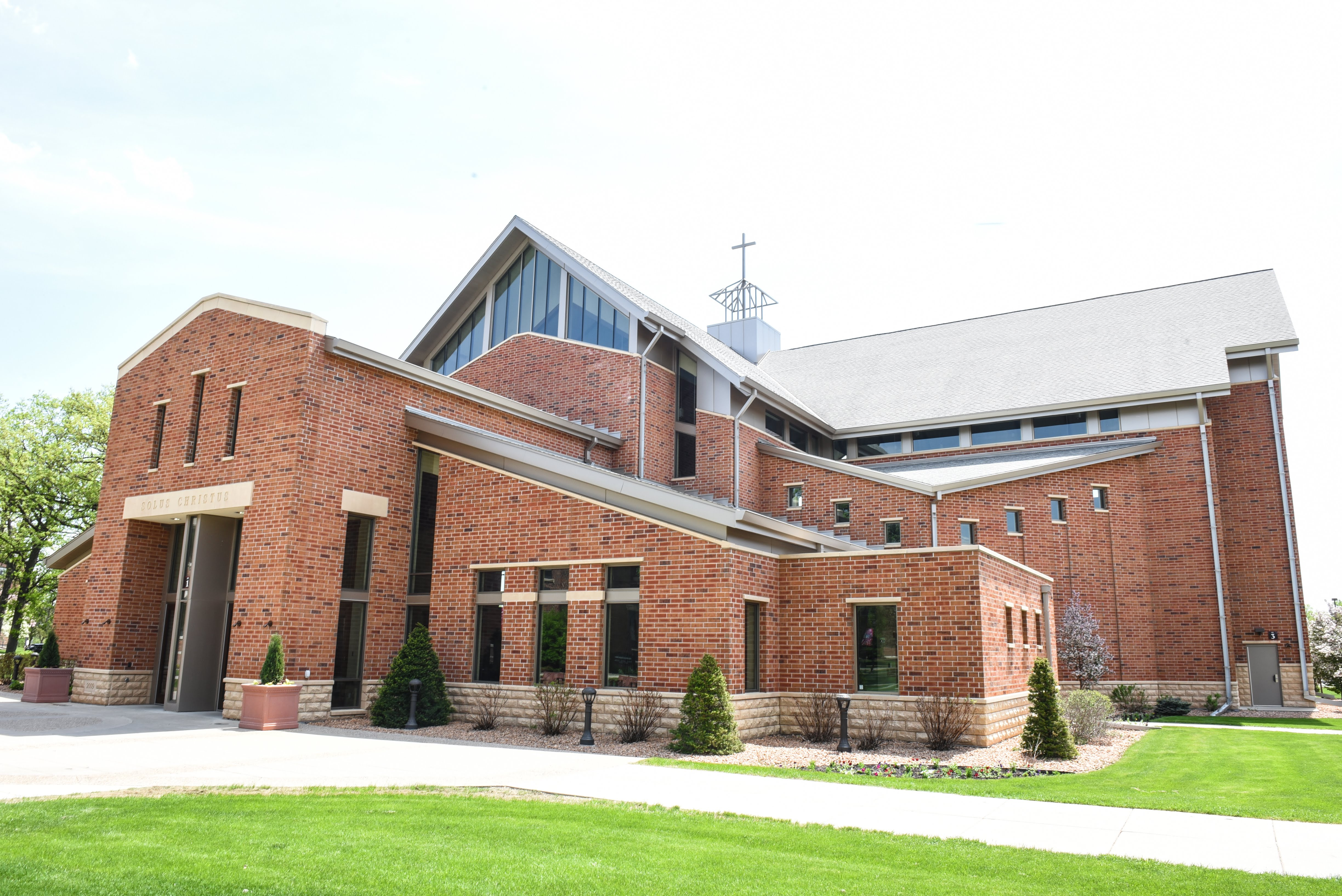
The Chapel of the Christ at Martin Luther College

Martin Luther College (MLC) was established in 1995 when Northwestern College (NWC) in Watertown, Wisconsin, combined with Dr. Martin Luther College (DMLC) in New Ulm, Minnesota, at the New Ulm campus. MLC is a private liberal arts college that is owned and operated by the WELS. MLC offers several undergraduate and graduate degree programs, all of which train students for service in the Wisconsin Synod. Men who graduate from the college's pre-seminary program may enroll at Wisconsin Lutheran Seminary. Men and women who graduate from its education programs may be assigned by the Wisconsin Synod as teachers and staff ministers to synod churches, schools, and missions.

The Chapel of the Christ was dedicated in 2010 at Martin Luther College to commemorate the 150th anniversary of the WELS.

=== New Latin American synod ===
In 2021, WELS sister churches in Bolivia, Colombia, Dominican Republic, Haiti, and Venezuela came together with the WELS to form a new synod: Iglesia Cristo WELS Internacional.

=== Presidents ===
The following is a list of presidents of the Wisconsin Evangelical Lutheran Synod from 1850 to the present.

| Years of service | President |
|---|---|
| 1850–1860 | Johannes Muehlhaeuser |
| 1860–1864 | John Bading |
| 1864–1865 | Gottlieb Reim |
| 1865–1867 | William Streissguth |
| 1867–1887 | John Bading |
| 1887–1908 | Phillip von Rohr |
| 1908–1933 | G.E. Bergemann |
| 1933–1953 | John Brenner |
| 1953–1979 | Oscar J. Naumann |
| 1979–1993 | Carl Mischke |
| 1993–2007 | Karl R. Gurgel |
| 2007–present | Mark G. Schroeder |

== Organization ==
=== Synodical government ===
The WELS is headed by a president and is supported by two vice presidents elected during its synod convention for terms of four years. The president oversees the administration of the synod. The current synod president is the Rev. Mark G. Schroeder.

Beneath the president are numerous administrative divisions addressing various areas of ministry. Among these are ministerial education, world missions, home missions, parish services, and fiscal services.

Synod conventions are held biennially in odd-numbered years and consist of elected male lay members from individual congregations from within the synod, ordained pastors and certified male teachers. Half of all delegates are to be lay members while the remaining half is divided between pastors and teachers. Synod conventions elect synodical leaders, and discuss and vote on synodical business. The WELS Synodical Council governs the church when the church is not in convention. The council is made up of twenty-three WELS members including eleven clergy and thirteen laymen. These men "act as a corporate board to plan and direct WELS worldwide ministry", but their decisions may be overruled by a synod convention.

The WELS is divided into 12 geographical districts in the United States and Canada, each headed by a district president elected in district conventions held during even-numbered years. District presidents serve terms of two years.

=== Missions ===
WELS Missions consists of all of the mission efforts of the WELS. These missions are made up of Home, World, and Joint Missions. Multi-Language Productions is an arm of WELS World Missions.

"Home Missions supports 126 congregations in the United States, Canada, and English-speaking West Indies, and assists hundreds of other congregations with their campus ministry programs. World Missions conducts gospel outreach in 40 foreign countries and is exploring outreach opportunities in 14 prospective new mission fields. Joint Missions oversees any mission opportunity that is a combination of Home Missions, World Missions, and Ministerial Education."

WELS Mission Journeys is the official WELS program for short-term mission trips for WELS members. "Through church- or school-based volunteer trips to WELS mission fields at home and abroad, members have the opportunity to engage in Christian service. Pre-trip training led by a Mission Journeys team leader equips volunteers to have significant impact during their trip. While volunteering, the learning and sharing of outreach ideas will allow teams to explore how they can use their God-given abilities to lead an outreach event upon their return home."

Home Missions

- New Missions and Enhancements
- Campus Ministry
- Antigua
- Canada
- St. Lucia

Joint Missions

- Hispanic Ministry
- Pastoral Studies Institute (PSI)
- WELS Mission Journeys
- Hmong Ministry
- South Asian Ministry
- Sudanese Ministry
- Vietnamese Ministry

Africa

- Cameroon
- Ethiopia
- Kenya
- Malawi
- Nigeria
- Zambia
- Central Africa Medical Mission

Apache Reservations

- San Carlos Apache Reservation
- Fort Apache Reservation

Asia

- Asia Lutheran Seminary
- East Asia
- India
- Indonesia
- Pakistan
- Philippines
- Thailand
- Vietnam - Hmong Outreach

Europe

- Albania
- Bulgaria
- Russia
- Ukraine

Latin America

- Online teaching and training through Academia Cristo reaches people throughout Latin America.
- Bolivia
- Brazil
- Colombia
- Ecuador
- Dominican Republic
- Haiti
- Mexico
- Paraguay
- Puerto Rico

Multi-Language Productions

=== Education ===
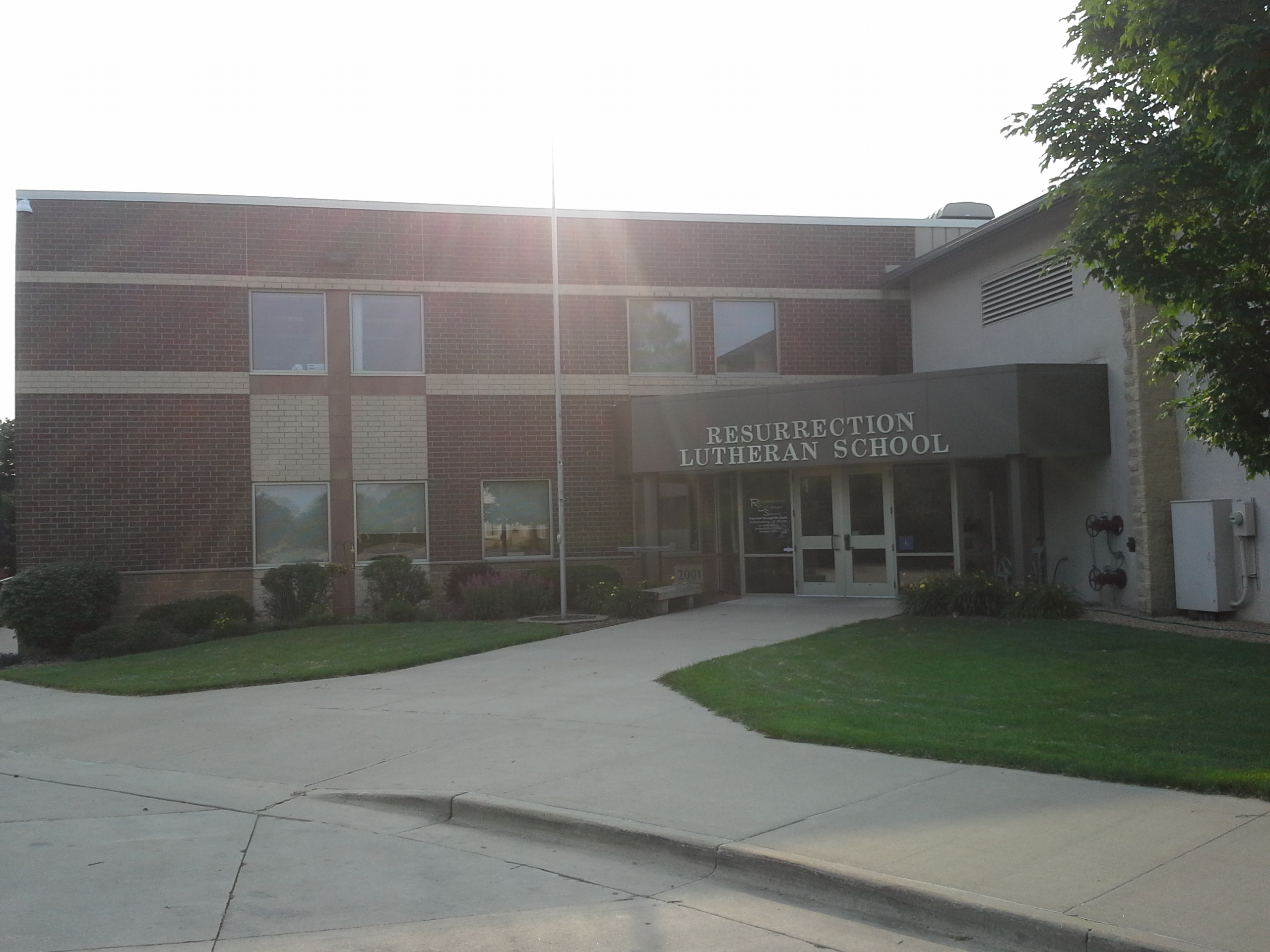
Resurrection Lutheran School, a WELS elementary school (Pre-K–8), in Rochester, Minnesota

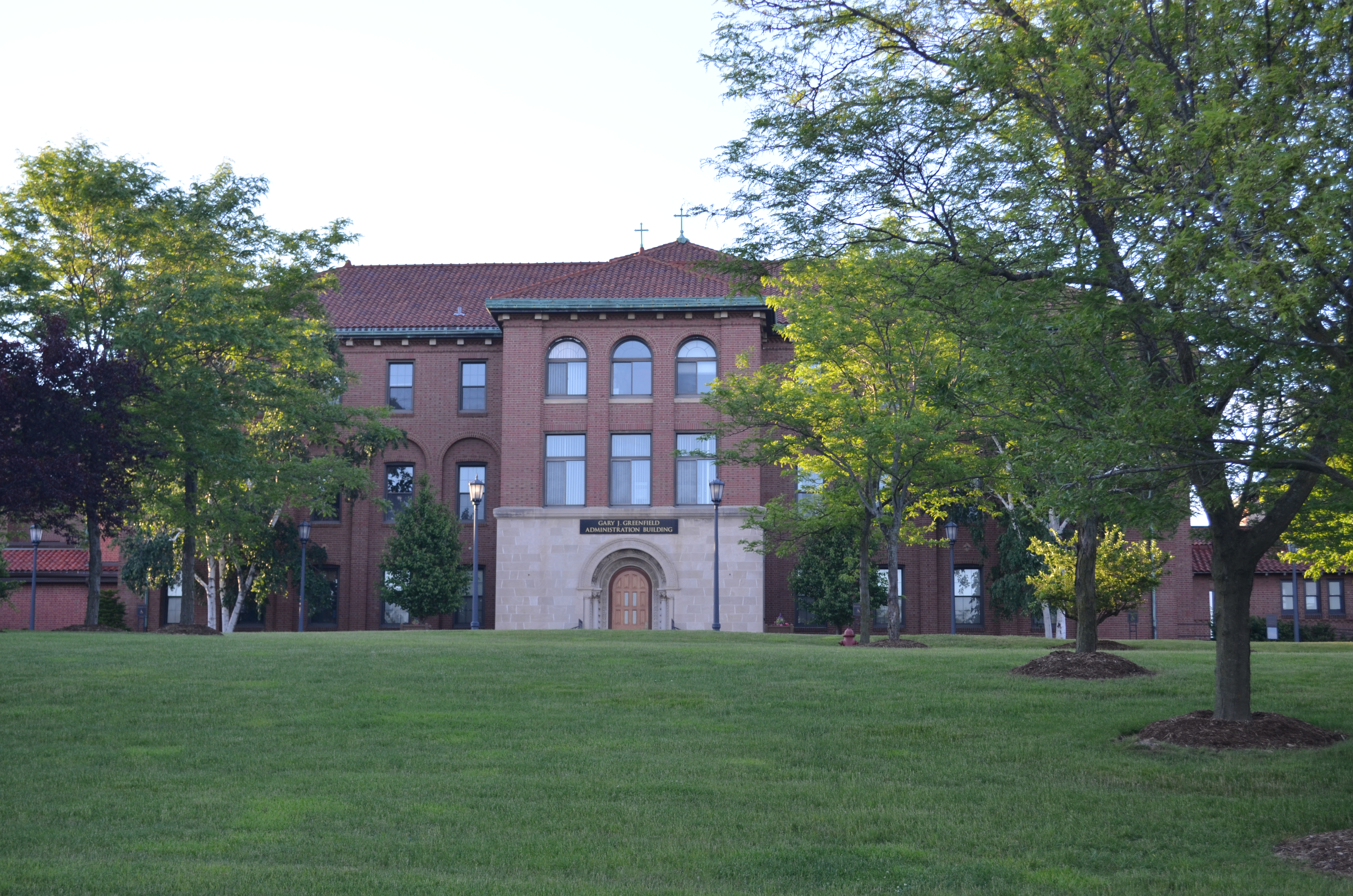
Wisconsin Lutheran College in Milwaukee, Wisconsin

The WELS school system is one of the largest private school system in the United States. As of 2021, WELS churches and associations operate 362 early childhood centers, 284 elementary schools, 29 high schools, 2 colleges, and 1 seminary across the nation.

The WELS maintains four schools of ministerial education: two college preparatory schools, Michigan Lutheran Seminary and Luther Preparatory School; a pre-seminary and teacher training college, Martin Luther College in New Ulm, Minnesota; and a seminary for training pastors, Wisconsin Lutheran Seminary, located in Mequon, Wisconsin.

Wisconsin Lutheran College, a liberal arts college in Milwaukee, is affiliated with the WELS and "is owned and operated by a corporation whose members consist of WELS congregations from across the country."

=== Campus ministry ===
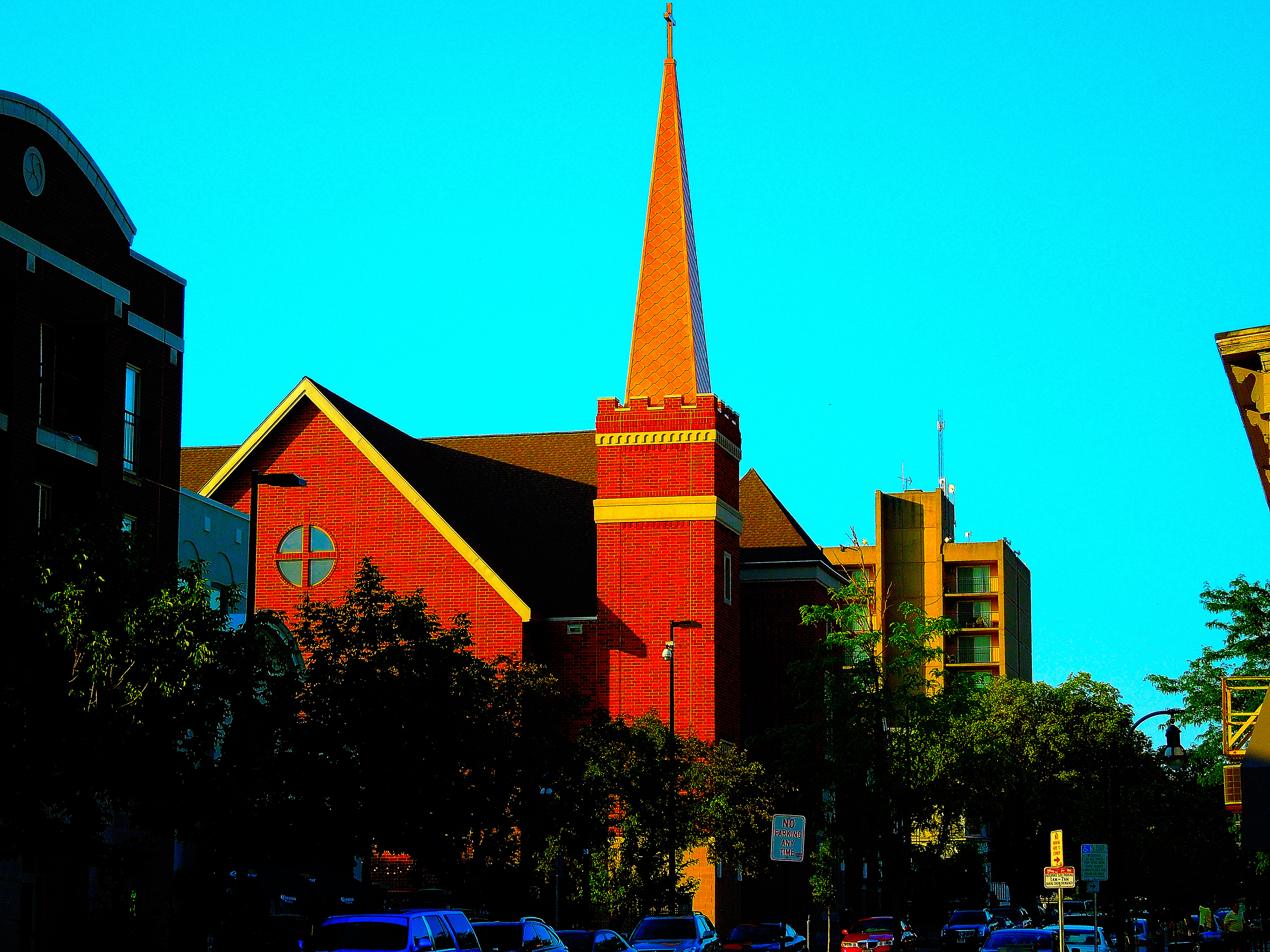
Wisconsin Lutheran Chapel in Madison, Wisconsin

The WELS has an extensive campus ministry system. The WELS provides financial support for 30 campus ministry programs and assistance for 550 campus ministries in the United States and Canada. The WELS also supports full and part-time campus pastors.

The first campus ministry program started in 1920 at the University of Wisconsin—Madison. Today, Wisconsin Lutheran Chapel is a campus ministry of the WELS that serves students of UW—Madison and other colleges in Madison, WI.

=== Christian Aid & Relief ===
Christian Aid & Relief (CAR) is a WELS organization that provides disaster relief and humanitarian aid to people and WELS churches and missions in need.

"The mission of Christian Aid and Relief is to reflect Christ's love and compassion to souls suffering from disasters and hardships. Because of what Christ has freely done for us, we eagerly show we care by offering our time, talents, and treasures to those in need."

CAR is made up mostly of volunteers who help in various ways. CAR also works with WELS missions and churches for various efforts. CAR also partners with various organizations to help carry out their efforts including Central Africa Medical Mission, Kingdom Workers, WELS Nurses Association, and Christian Family Solutions.

=== Discipleship ===
The WELS Commission on Discipleship is an organization that "... provides resources, encouragement, and training to assist congregations as they seek to strengthen individuals and families in their connection to Christ and their ongoing walk of faith." The focus of the WELS Commission on Discipleship is in the following areas:

Youth related

- Apologetics
- Confirmation
- Early Childhood Ministry
- International Youth Rally
- Sunday School
- Youth Retention

Adult related

- Interactive Faith Bible Studies
- Marriage Enrichment
- Small/Growth Group Ministries
- WELS Men & Women's Ministry

Congregation related

- Closing the Backdoor (member loss prevention)
- Elder training
- Family Faith
- Member Integration

=== Military services ===
The WELS Military Services Committee provides spiritual services through full and part-time chaplains to WELS members and other people in the United States Armed Forces. The WELS has a full-time civilian chaplain in Europe and a national civilian chaplain and liaison to the military. The WELS also has 122 pastors who serve as part-time chaplains throughout the United States and around the world.

=== Deaf and hard of hearing ===
The WELS Mission for the Deaf and Hard of Hearing helps congregations to serve the deaf and hard of hearing.

=== Visually impaired ===
The WELS Mission for the Visually Impaired helps congregations serve those who cannot see or who because of visual impairment or a print impairment cannot read a book or other printed material. The WELS Mission for the Visually Impaired is able to provide a wide variety of Christian resources for free to anyone who qualifies because of copyright law.

=== Evangelism ===
The WELS Commission on Evangelism "... assists congregations to seize opportunities the Lord provides to evangelize lost souls by developing and promoting evangelism resources and by promoting evangelism attitudes, structures, and programs consistent with Christian doctrine."

What About Jesus is "... a website that presents basic belief topics in an easy-to-understand format for those who aren't familiar with God's Word."

The WELS Commission on Evangelism also has made a series of Christian movies to be used as evangelism tools. These movies include Road to Emmaus, Come Follow Me, My Son, My Savior, and To the Ends of the Earth.

The WELS Commission on Evangelism also offers the School of Outreach for WELS congregations. "The School of Outreach serves WELS congregations with planning, assistance, and resources for congregational evangelism programming and implementation of outreach strategies."

The WELS Commission on Evangelism also offers evangelism courses through the Martin Luther College continuing education program.

=== Multi-Language Productions ===
The WELS Multi-Language Productions (MLP) has made more than 2.9 million audio, video, and print materials. MLP has also made online training resources in over 54 languages. "Through these resources MLP can assist and enhance outreach for all churches, especially in places where WELS does not have resident missionaries."

=== Congregational counseling ===
The WELS Commission on Congregational Counseling "assists WELS congregations to assess and evaluate ministry, review biblical teachings and principles that impact ministry, develop plans to adjust and expand ministry in appropriate ways, and carry out their plans over a period of time."

=== Publishing ===
Northwestern Publishing House (NPH) has been the official publishing house for the synod since June 23, 1891. Located in Milwaukee, Wisconsin, it produces a wide variety of materials including curriculum, periodicals, books, and worship resources. The publications are mainly for use of churches, schools, pastors, and members of the WELS. Its retail store, NPH Christian Books and Gifts, was also located in Milwaukee, but closed in September 2018. NPH has since moved to the synod's headquarters, the WELS Center for Mission and Ministry.

Main WELS periodicals include Forward in Christ: A Lutheran Voice, the WELS's monthly family magazine, and Wisconsin Lutheran Quarterly, a quarterly theological magazine.

Most WELS churches use Christian Worship: A Lutheran Hymnal, with some using the 1941 Lutheran Hymnal or no hymnal at all. In 1911, the Wisconsin Synod had published Church Hymnal for Lutheran Services. Christian Worship: Hymnal is a new hymnal published by NPH that was released during the Advent season, 2021.

== Membership ==
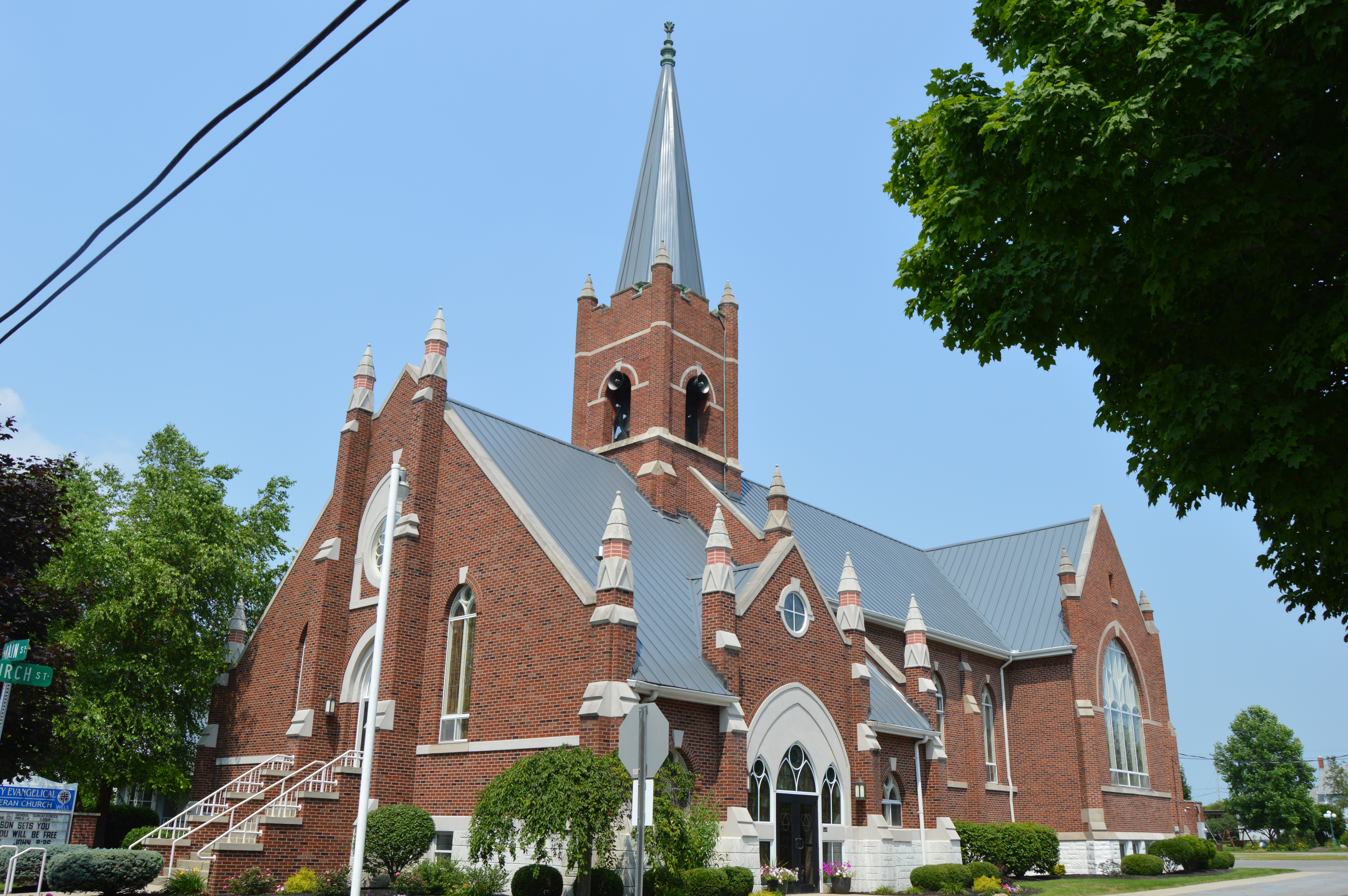
A WELS church in Jenera, Ohio

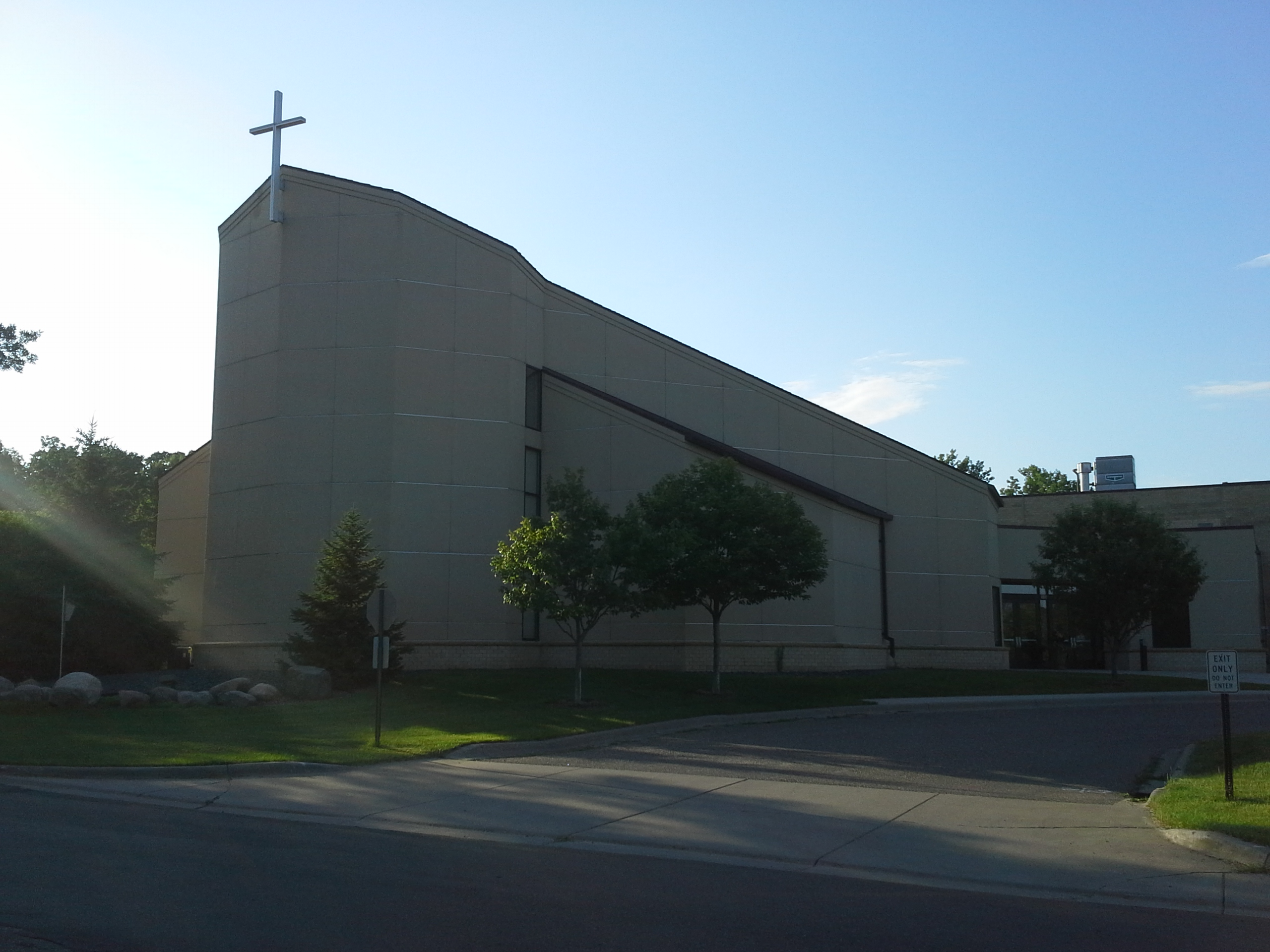
A modern WELS church in West St. Paul, Minnesota

The WELS experienced significant growth during much of the twentieth century. In 1925, there were 139,226 members in 662 churches. By 1950 there were over 300,000 members. Membership peaked in the early 1990s at just over 400,000 and has declined slightly since that time. In 2006 the denomination reported 395,497 members in 1,276 congregations. In 2022, the denomination reported 340,511 baptized members. Wisconsin remains the geographic center of the denomination, with over 400 churches and over 200,000 members. Other than Wisconsin, the states with the highest rates of adherents are South Dakota, Minnesota, Michigan, and Nebraska.

Before the late 1960s, the denomination was almost entirely found in the states of the Great Lakes and Great Plains, but with the migration of WELS people to Southern and Western states and the influx of former LCMS conservatives to the WELS, membership outside the region grew strongly in the 1970s and 1980s.

== Church fellowship ==
Fellowship between the WELS and other church groups is established only upon investigation and confirmation that both church groups hold complete unity in doctrine. The WELS is in fellowship with the members of the Confessional Evangelical Lutheran Conference, which meets this requirement.

== See also ==
- Christian Family Solutions
- Evangelical Heritage Version
