= Apostolic succession =

Continuous succession from the apostles

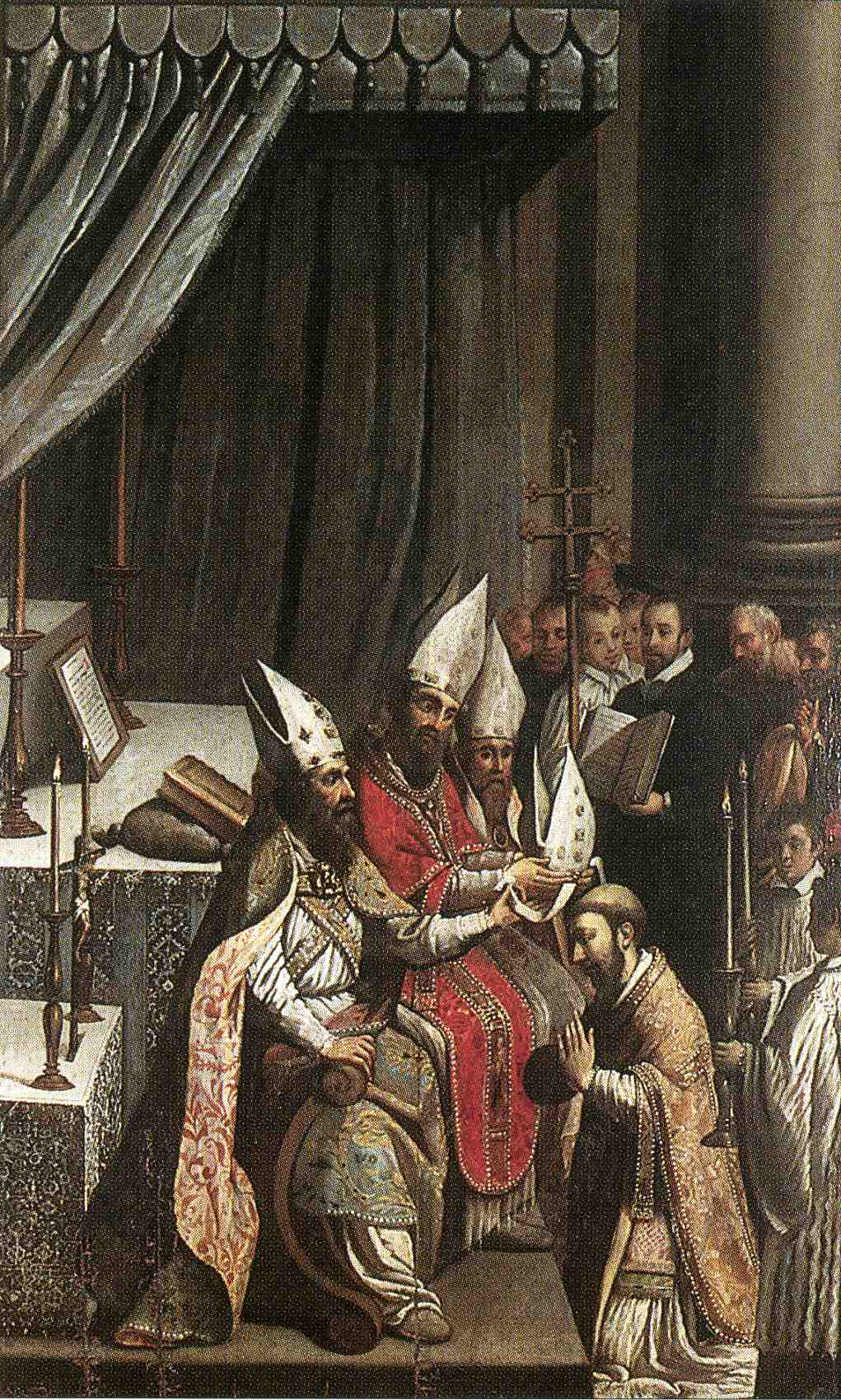
The episcopal ordination of Deodatus; Claude Bassot (1580–1630)

Apostolic succession is the method whereby the ministry of the Christian Church is considered by some Christian denominations to be derived from the apostles by a continuous succession, which has usually been associated with a claim that the succession is through a series of bishops. Those of the Roman Catholic and Eastern Orthodox; Oriental Orthodox and Church of the East; Scandinavian Lutheran, Anglican, Moravian and Czechoslovak Hussite; and Old Catholic traditions maintain that a bishop's orders are neither regular nor valid without consecration through apostolic succession. These traditions do not always consider the episcopal consecrations of all of the other traditions as valid.

This series was seen originally as that of the bishops of a particular see founded by one or more of the apostles. According to historian Justo L. González, apostolic succession is generally understood today as meaning a series of bishops, regardless of see, each consecrated by other bishops, themselves consecrated similarly in a succession going back to the apostles. According to the Joint International Commission for Theological Dialogue Between the Catholic Church and the Orthodox Church, "apostolic succession" means more than a mere transmission of powers. It is succession in a church which witnesses to the apostolic faith, in communion with the other churches, witnesses of the same apostolic faith. The "see (cathedra) plays an important role in inserting the bishop into the heart of ecclesial apostolicity", but once ordained, the bishop becomes in his church the guarantor of apostolicity and becomes a successor of the apostles.

Those who hold for the importance of apostolic succession via episcopal laying on of hands appeal to the New Testament which, they say, implies a personal apostolic succession, from Paul to Timothy and Titus, for example. They appeal as well to other documents of the early Church, especially the Epistle of Clement. In this context, Clement explicitly states that the apostles appointed bishops as successors and directed that these bishops should in turn appoint their own successors; given this, such leaders of the Christian Church were nBot to be removed without cause and not in this way. Further, proponents of the necessity of the personal apostolic succession of bishops within the Christian Church point to the universal practice of the Great Church and state church of the Roman Empire, up to AD 431, before it was divided into the Church of the East, Oriental Orthodoxy, the Eastern Orthodox Church and the Roman Catholic Church.

Some Christians, including many Protestants, deny the need for this type of continuity and severely question the historical claims involved; Anglican academic Eric G. Jay comments that the account given of the emergence of the episcopate in Chapter III of the dogmatic constitution Lumen gentium (1964) "is very sketchy, and many ambiguities in the early history of the Christian ministry are passed over". Still, others (primarily African-American Pentecostals within North America) teach and claim the importance of apostolic succession through individuals such as J. Delano Ellis and Paul S. Morton of the Joint College of African-American Pentecostal Bishops.

== Definitions ==
Michael Ramsey, an English Anglican bishop and the archbishop of Canterbury (1961–1974), described three meanings of "apostolic succession":

1. One bishop succeeding another in the same see meant that there was a continuity of teaching: "while the Church as a whole is the vessel into which the truth is poured, the Bishops are an important organ in carrying out this task".
2. The bishops were also successors of the apostles in that "the functions they performed of preaching, governing and ordaining were the same as the Apostles had performed".
3. It is also used to signify that "grace is transmitted from the Apostles by each generation of bishops through the imposition of hands".

He adds that this last has been controversial in that it has been claimed that this aspect of the doctrine is not found before the time of Augustine of Hippo, while others allege that it is implicit in the Church of the second and third centuries.

In its 1982 statement on Baptism, Eucharist and Ministry, the Faith and Order Commission of the World Council of Churches stated that "the primary manifestation of apostolic succession is to be found in the apostolic tradition of the Church as a whole. ... Under the particular historical circumstances of the growing Church in the early centuries, the succession of bishops became one of the ways, together with the transmission of the Gospel and the life of the community, in which the apostolic tradition of the Church was expressed." It spoke of episcopal succession as something that churches that do not have bishops can see "as a sign, though not a guarantee, of the continuity and unity of the Church" and that all churches can see "as a sign of the apostolicity of the life of the whole church".

The Porvoo Common statement (1996)—agreed to by the Anglican churches of the British Isles and most of the Lutheran churches of Scandinavia and the Baltic—echoed the Munich (1982) and Finland (1988) statements of the Joint International Commission for Theological Dialogue between the Catholic Church and the Orthodox Church by stating that "the continuity signified in the consecration of a bishop to episcopal ministry cannot be divorced from the continuity of life and witness of the diocese to which he is called".

Some Anglicans, in addition to other Protestants, held that apostolic succession "may also be understood as a continuity in doctrinal teaching from the time of the apostles to the present". For example, the British Methodist Conference locates the "true continuity" with the early Church of past ages in "the continuity of Christian experience, the fellowship in the gift of the one Spirit; in the continuity in the allegiance to one Lord, the continued proclamation of the message; the continued acceptance of the mission".

The teaching of the Second Vatican Council on apostolic succession has been summed up as follows:

Bishops have succeeded the apostles, not only because they come after them, but also because they have inherited apostolic power. ... "To fulfil this apostolic mission, Christ ... promised the Holy Spirit to the apostles&;...". [These were] "enriched by Christ the Lord with a special outpouring of the Holy Spirit ... This spiritual gift has been transmitted down to us by episcopal consecration".

== Development ==
=== In the early Fathers ===
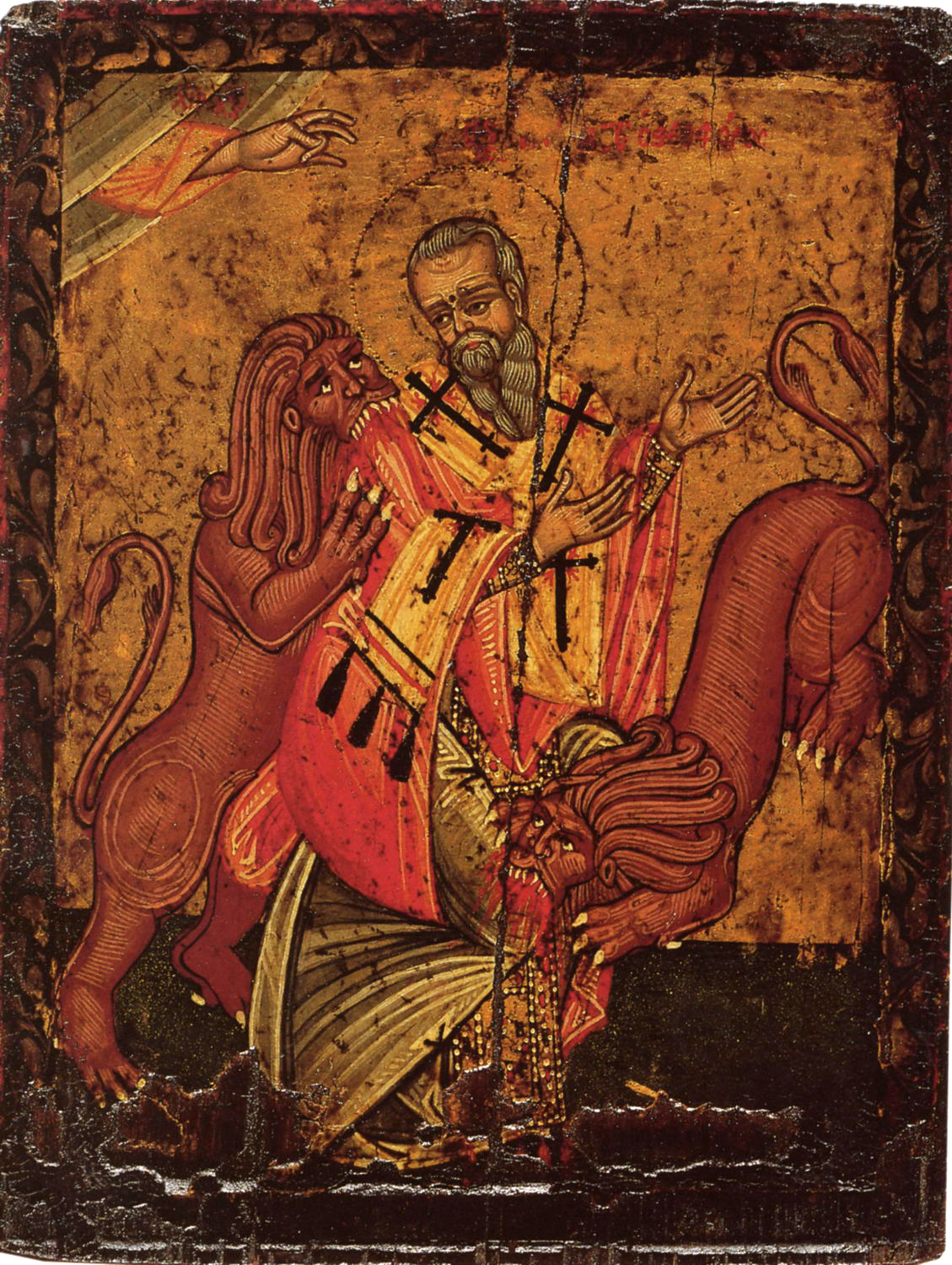
Ignatius of Antioch

According to International Theological Commission (ITC), conflicts could not always be avoided between individuals among the New Testament communities; Paul appealed to his apostolic authority when there was a disagreement about the Gospel or principles of Christian life. How the development of apostolic government proceeded is difficult to denote accurately because of the paucity of relevant documents. The ITC says that the apostles, or their closest assistants or their successors, directed the local colleges of episkopoi (overseers) and presbyteroi (elders) by the end of the first century; while by the beginning of the second century the figure of a single bishop, as the head of the communities, appears explicitly in the letters of Ignatius of Antioch (c. 35-107). In the Epistle to the Smyrnaeans, Ignatius wrote about three degrees ministry:

See that you all follow the bishop, even as Jesus Christ does the Father, and the presbytery as you would the apostles; and reverence the deacons, as being the institution of God. Let no man do anything connected with the Church without the bishop.

Ramsey says that the doctrine was formulated in the second century in the first of the three senses given by him, originally as a response to Gnostic claims of having received secret teaching from Christ or the apostles; it emphasised the public manner in which the apostles had passed on authentic teaching to those whom they entrusted with the care of the churches they founded and that these in turn had passed it on to their successors. Ramsey argues that only later was it given a different meaning, a process in which Augustine (Bishop of Hippo Regis, 395–430) played a part by emphasising the idea of "the link from consecrator to consecrated whereby the grace of order was handed on".

Writing in about AD 94, Clement of Rome states that the apostles appointed successors to continue their work where they had planted churches and for these in their turn to do the same because they foresaw the risk of discord: "Our Apostles, too, by the instruction of our Lord Jesus Christ, knew that strife would arise concerning the dignity of a bishop; and on this account, having received perfect foreknowledge, they appointed the above-mentioned as bishops and deacons: and then gave a rule of succession, in order that, when they had fallen asleep, other men, who had been approved, might succeed to their ministry". According to Anglican Eric G. Jay, the interpretation of his writing is disputed, but it is clear that he supports some sort of approved continuation of the ministry exercised by the apostles which in its turn was derived from Christ.

According to John Zizioulas, the Didache portrays bishops and deacons as successors to the earlier charismatic leaders, prophets and teachers, who originally led the community in teaching and in celebrating the Eucharist. By linking their ordination directly to the Eucharistic context, the text indicates that bishops and deacons inherited the same ministry once exercised by the prophets, rather than replacing it. This reflects an early stage in the Christian Church's development where charismatic leadership evolved into an ordained structure, maintaining continuity in function and preserving the unity of the local church through the Eucharist.

Hegesippus (180?) and Irenaeus (180) introduce explicitly the idea of the bishop's succession in office as a guarantee of the truth of what he preached in that it could be traced back to the apostles, and they produced succession lists to back this up. That this succession depended on the fact of ordination to a vacant see and the status of those who administered the ordination is seldom commented on. Woollcombe also states that no one questioned the apostolicity of the see of Alexandria despite the fact that its popes were consecrated by the college of presbyters up till the time of the Council of Nicaea in 325. On the contrary, other sources clearly state that Mark the Evangelist is the first bishop of Alexandria (pope of Alexandria); then he ordained Annianus as his successor bishop (2nd pope) as told by Eusebius.

James F. Puglisi, director of Centro Pro Unione, made a conclusion about Irenaeus' writings: "the terms episkopos and presbyteros are interchangeable, but the term episkopos [bishop] is applied to the person who is established in every Church by the apostles and their successors". According to Eric G. Jay, Irenaeus also refers to a succession of presbyters who preserve the tradition "which originates from the apostles" and later goes on to speak of their having "an infallible gift of truth" [charisma veritatis certum]. Jay comments that this is sometimes seen as an early reference to the idea of the transmission of grace through the apostolic succession which in later centuries was understood as being specifically transmitted through the laying on of hands by a bishop within the apostolic succession (the "pipeline theory"). He warns that this is open to the grave objection that it makes grace a (quasi) material commodity and represents an almost mechanical method of imparting what is by definition a free gift. He adds that the idea cannot be squeezed out of Irenaeus' words.

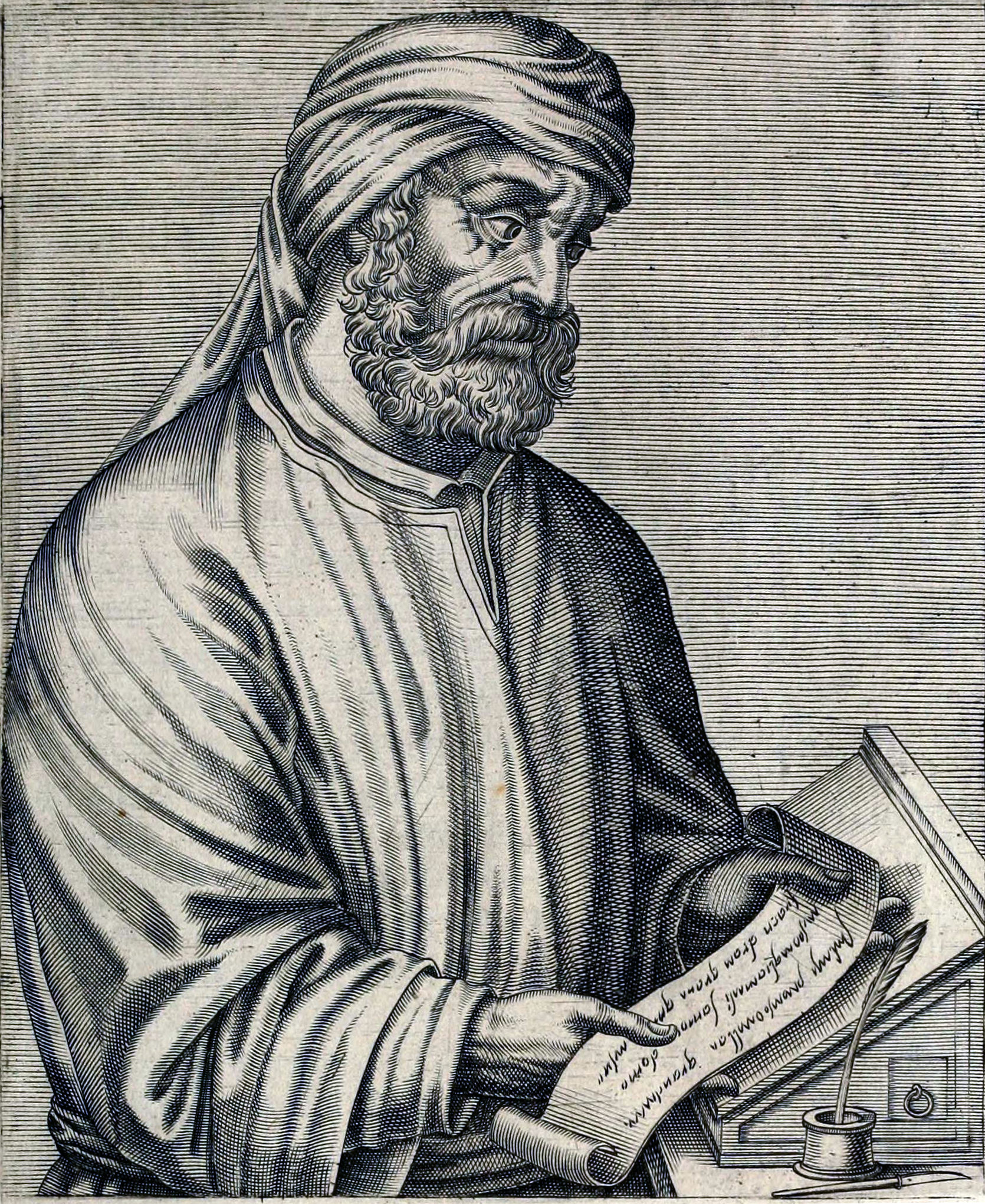
Tertullian

Writing a little later, Tertullian makes the same main point but adds expressly that recently founded churches (such as his own in Carthage) could be considered apostolic if they had "derived the tradition of faith and the seeds of doctrine" from an apostolic church, whether they had devised a succession list or not. Tertullian stated:

Let them produce the original records of their churches; let them unfold the roll of their bishops, running down in due succession from the beginning in such a manner that [that first bishop of theirs ] bishop shall be able to show for his ordainer and predecessor some one of the apostles or of apostolic men, — a man, moreover, who continued steadfast with the apostles. For this is the manner in which the apostolic churches transmit their registers: as the church of Smyrna, which records that Polycarp was placed therein by John; as also the church of Rome, which makes Clement to have been ordained in like manner by Peter. In exactly the same way the other churches likewise exhibit (their several worthies), whom, as having been appointed to their episcopal places by apostles, they regard as transmitters of the apostolic seed. Let the heretics contrive something of the same kind. For after their blasphemy, what is there that is unlawful for them (to attempt)? But should they even effect the contrivance, they will not advance a step. For their very doctrine, after comparison with that of the apostles, will declare, by its own diversity and contrariety, that it had for its author neither an apostle nor an apostolic man; because, as the apostles would never have taught things which were self-contradictory, so the apostolic men would not have inculcated teaching different from the apostles, unless they who received their instruction from the apostles went and preached in a contrary manner. To this test, therefore will they be submitted for proof by those churches, who, although they derive not their founder from apostles or apostolic men (as being of much later date, for they are in fact being founded daily), yet, since they agree in the same faith, they are accounted as not less apostolic because they are akin in doctrine. Then let all the heresies, when challenged to these two tests by our apostolic church, offer their proof of how they deem themselves to be apostolic. But in truth they neither are so, nor are they able to prove themselves to be what they are not. Nor are they admitted to peaceful relations and communion by such churches as are in any way connected with apostles, inasmuch as they are in no sense themselves apostolic because of their diversity as to the mysteries of the faith.

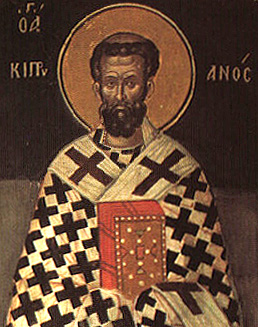
Cyprian of Carthage

His disciple and recent convert, Cyprian (Bishop of Carthage 248–58) appeals to the same fundamental principle of election to a vacant see in the aftermath of the Decian Persecution when denying the legitimacy of his rigorist rival in Carthage and that of the anti-pope Novatian in Rome.

The emphasis is now on legitimating Cyprian's episcopal ministry as a whole and specifically his exclusive right to administer discipline to the lapsed rather than on the content of what is taught. Cyprian also laid great emphasis on the fact that any minister who broke with the entire Church lost ipso facto the gift of the Spirit which had validated his orders. This meant that the minister would have no power or authority to celebrate an efficacious sacrament; in contrast, Augustine of Hippo and others taught that schism did not invalidate someone's holy orders (see also: sacramental character).

=== As transmission of grace ===
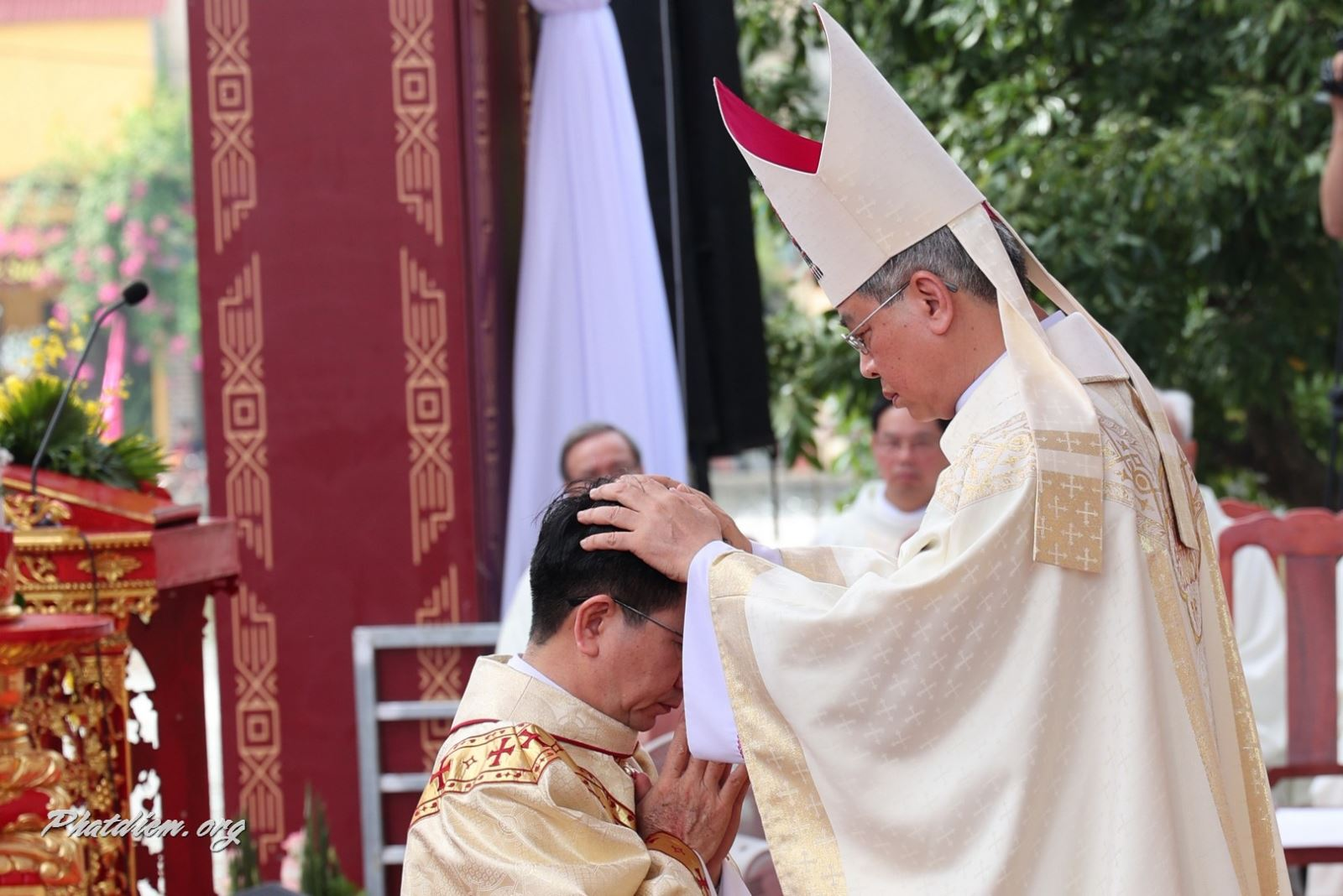
Laying on of hands at the episcopal ordination of Kieu Cong Tung

For the adherents of the gracefully transmitted understanding of apostolic succession, grace is transmitted during episcopal consecrations (the ordination of bishops) by the laying on of hands of bishops previously consecrated within the tactile succession (see also: historic episcopacy). They hold that this lineage of ordination derives from the Twelve Apostles, thus making the contemporary Christian Church the continuation of the early Apostolic Christian community. They see it as one of four elements that define the true Church of Jesus Christ, and legitimize the ministry of its clergy, since only a bishop within the succession can perform valid ordinations and only bishops and presbyters (priests) ordained by bishops in this understanding of apostolic succession can validly celebrate (or "confect") several of the other sacraments, including the Eucharist, reconciliation of penitents, confirmation and anointing of the sick. Everett Ferguson argued that Hippolytus, in Apostolic Tradition 9, is the first known source to state that only bishops have the authority to ordain; and normally at least three bishops were required to ordain another bishop. Cyprian also asserted that "if any one is not with the bishop, he is not in the church".

This position was stated by John Henry Newman, before his conversion from Anglicanism to Roman Catholicism, in Tracts for the Times:

We [priests of the Church of England] have been born, not of blood, nor of the will of the flesh, nor of the will of man, but of God. The Lord Jesus Christ gave His Spirit to His Apostles; they in turn laid their hands on those who should succeed them; and these again on others; and so the sacred gift has been handed down to our present bishops, who have appointed us as their assistants, and in some sense representatives. ... we must necessarily consider none to be really ordained who have not thus been ordained.

Ferguson, in Encyclopedia of Early Christianity, says that example of James and the elders (presbyters) of the Jerusalem Church (Acts 21:18) may have provided a model for the development of 'monepiscopacy', in which James' position has figured conspicuously in modern theories about the rise of the monepiscopacy. Raymond E. Brown says that in the earlier stage (before the third century and perhaps earlier) there were plural bishops or overseers ("presbyter-bishops") in an individual community; in the later stage changed to only one bishop per community. Little is known about how the early bishops were formally chosen or appointed; afterwards the early Church developed a regularized pattern of selection and ordination of bishops, and from the third century on that was universally applied. Brown asserts that the ministry was not ordained by the early Church to act on its own authority, but as an important part to continue the ministry of Jesus Christ and helps to make the Church what it is.

Brown also states that by the early second century, as written in the letters of Ignatius of Antioch, in the threefold structure of the single bishop, plural presbyters, and plural deacons, the celebration of the Eucharist is assigned to the bishop alone; the bishop may delegate others when he goes away. At the Last Supper, Jesus says to those present, who were or included the Twelve Apostles, "Do this in remembrance of me," Brown presumes that the Twelve were remembered as presiding at the Eucharist. But they could scarcely have been present at all the Eucharists of the first century, and no information in New Testament whether a person was regularly assigned to do this task and, if so, who that person was. After all the early Church regulated and regularized the celebration of the Eucharist, as that was an inevitable establishment if communities were to be provided regularly with the 'bread of life', since it could not rely on gratuitous provision.

=== Objections to the transmission of grace theory ===
According to William Griffith Thomas, some Protestants have objected that this theory is not explicitly found in Scripture, and the New Testament uses 'bishop' and 'presbyter' as alternative names for the same office. Michael Ramsey argued it is not clearly found in the writings of the Fathers before Augustine in the fourth century and there were attempts to read it back as implicit in earlier writers.

For example, C. K. Barrett points out that the pastoral epistles are concerned that ministers of the generation of Timothy and Titus should pass on the doctrine they had received to the third generation. According to Barrett, teaching and preaching are "the main, almost the only, activities of ministry". He argues that in Clement of Rome ministerial activity is liturgical: the undifferentiated 'presbyter-bishops' are to "make offerings to the Lord at the right time and in the right places" something which is simply not defined by the evangelists. He mentions the change in the use of sacrificial language as a more significant still: for Paul the Eucharist is a receiving of gifts from God, the Christian sacrifice is the offering of one's body.

Moving on to Ignatius of Antioch, Barrett states that a sharp distinction is found between 'presbyter' and 'bishop': the latter now stands out as "an isolated figure" who is to be obeyed and without whom it is not lawful to baptise or hold a love-feast. He points out that when Ignatius writes to the Romans, there is no mention of a bishop of the Roman Church, "which we may suppose had not yet adopted the monarchical episcopate". Jalland comes to a similar conclusion and locates the change from the "polyepiscopacy" of the house church model in Rome, to monepiscopacy as occurring before the middle of the second century.

Similar objections are voiced by Harvey A.E. who comments that there is a "strong and ancient tradition" that the presence of an ordained man is necessary for the celebration of the Eucharist. But, according to him, there is "certainly no evidence for this view in the New Testament" and in the case of Clement of Rome and Ignatius of Antioch the implication is not that it cannot be celebrated by anyone else, but that it ought not. Harvey says in the third century this "concern for propriety" begins to be displaced by the concept of 'power' to do so which means that in the absence of such a man it is "literally impossible" for a Eucharist to be celebrated.

=== Apostolicity as doctrinal and related continuity ===
Some Protestant denominations—not including Scandinavian Lutherans, high church Anglicans and Moravians—deny the need of maintaining episcopal continuity with the early Church, holding that the role of the Christian apostles was that, having been chosen directly by Jesus as witnesses of his resurrection, they were to be the "special instruments of the Holy Spirit in founding and building up the Church". Anglican theologian E. A. Litton argues that the Christian Church is "built upon 'the foundation of the Prophets and Apostles', but a foundation does not repeat itself"; therefore he says that when the apostles died, they were replaced by their writings. To share with the apostles the same faith, to believe their word as found in the Scriptures, to receive the same Holy Spirit, is to many Protestants the only meaningful "continuity". The most meaningful apostolic succession for them, then, is a "faithful succession" of apostolic teaching. This is synonymous with Tertullian's statement on newer churches maintaining apostolicity regardless of providing a succession list; this teaching contrasts with those who consider succession as encompassing both doctrinal continuity and the historical episcopate.

Max Thurian—before his conversion to Roman Catholicism in 1988—described the classic Reformed/Presbyterian concept of apostolic succession in the following terms: "The Christian ministry is not derived from the people but from the pastors; a scriptural ordinance provides for this ministry being renewed by the ordination of a presbyter by presbyters; this ordinance originates with the apostles, who were themselves presbyters, and through them it goes back to Christ as its source." Then he continued:

"it does not guarantee the continuity and faithfulness of the Church. A purely historical or mechanical succession of ministers, bishops or pastors would not mean ipso facto true apostolic succession in the church, Reformed tradition, following authentic Catholic tradition, distinguishes four realities which make up the true apostolic succession, symbolized, but not absolutely guaranteed, by ministerial succession." At the same time Thurian argued that the realities form a "composite faithfulness" and are (i) "perseverance in the apostolic doctrine"; (ii) "the will to proclaim God's word"; (iii) "communion in the fundamental continuity of the Church, the Body of Christ, the faithful celebration of Baptism and the Eucharist"; (iv) "succession in the laying on of hands, the sign of ministerial continuity".

According to Walter Kasper, the Reformed-Catholic dialogue came to belief that there is an apostolic succession which is important to the life of the Church, though both sides distinguish the meaning of that succession. Besides, the dialogue states that apostolic succession "consists at least in continuity of apostolic doctrine, but this is not in opposition to succession through continuity of ordained ministry". While the Lutheran-Catholic dialogue distinguished between apostolic succession in faith (in substantive meaning) and apostolic succession as ministerial succession of bishops, it agreed that "succession in the sense of the succession of ministers must be seen within the succession of the whole church in the apostolic faith".

The Joint International Commission for Theological Dialogue Between the Catholic Church and the Orthodox Church asserts that apostolic succession means something more than just a transmission of authorities; it witnesses to the apostolic faith from the same apostolic faith, and in communion with other churches (attached to the apostolic communion). Apostolic tradition deals with the community, not only an ordained bishop as an isolated person. Since the bishop, once ordained, becomes the guarantor of apostolicity and successor of the apostles; he joins all the bishops, thus maintaining episkope of the local churches derived from the college of the apostles.

== Churches claiming apostolic succession ==
Churches that claim some form of episcopal apostolic succession, dating back to the apostles or to leaders from the apostolic era, include:

- the Roman Catholic Church
- the Eastern Orthodox Church
- the Oriental Orthodox Churches
- the Church of the East
- the Moravian Church
- the Anglican Communion
- many Lutheran churches
- Old Catholics and other Independent Catholics (those incorporating the term "Catholic")
- True Orthodox and Old Calendarists
- the Continuing Anglican movement
- the Convergence Movement

Those Lutheran churches, as well as the Anglican Communion and other Anglican denominations, that claim apostolic succession exclusively practice episcopal ordination. While some Anglicans or Episcopalians claim it for their communion, their views are often nuanced and there is widespread reluctance to 'unchurch' Christian bodies which lack it. After the English Reformation, Anglicanism "followed the major continental Reformers in their doctrine of the true church, identifiable by the authentic ministry of word and sacrament, in their rejection of the jurisdiction of the pope, and in their alliance with the civil authority ('the magistrate')".

The Church of Jesus Christ of Latter-day Saints also claims apostolic succession. Within the African-American Christian tradition, some Pentecostals (primarily Oneness Pentecostals) claim apostolic succession through the teachings of J. Delano Ellis and the Joint College of African-American Pentecostal Bishops.

== Apostolic founders ==
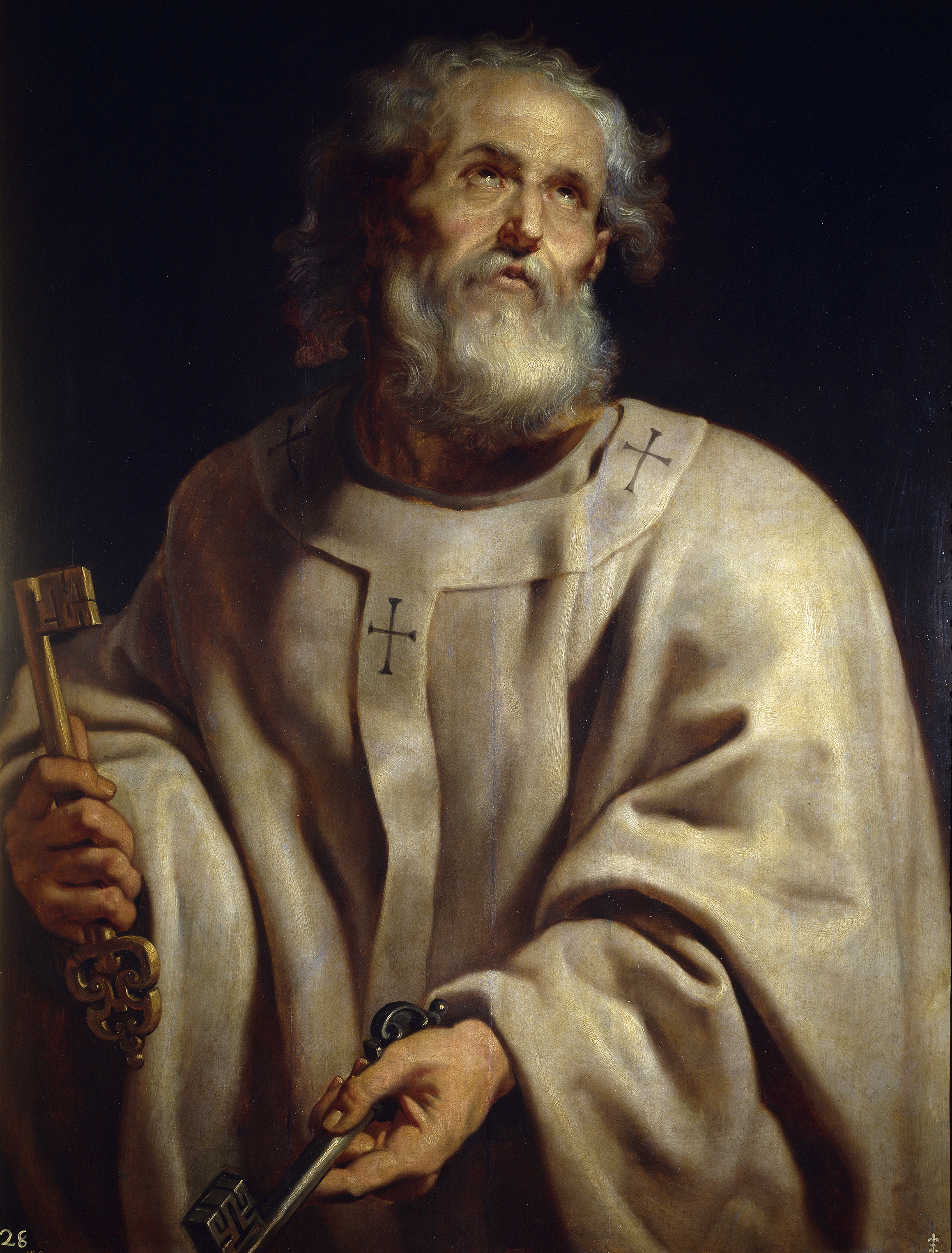
Apostle Peter portrayed as a pope

An early understanding of apostolic succession is represented by the traditional beliefs of various churches, as organised around important episcopal sees, to have been founded by specific apostles. On the basis of these traditions, the churches hold they have inherited specific authority, doctrines or practices on the authority of their founding apostle(s), which is understood to be continued by the bishops of the apostolic throne of the church that each founded and whose original leader he was. Thus:

- The See of Rome, the head see of the Catholic Church, states that it was founded by Simon Peter (traditionally called "Prince of the Apostles" and "Chief of the Apostles") and Paul the Apostle. Although Peter also founded the See of Antioch, the See of Rome claims the full authority of Peter (who, according to Catholic doctrine, was the visible head of the church and the sole chief of the apostles) exclusively for itself, because Peter died as the Bishop of Rome, and not of another see.
- The Ecumenical Patriarchate of Constantinople—the primary patriarchate of the Eastern Orthodox Church—states that Apostle Andrew (elder brother of Simon Peter) was its founder.
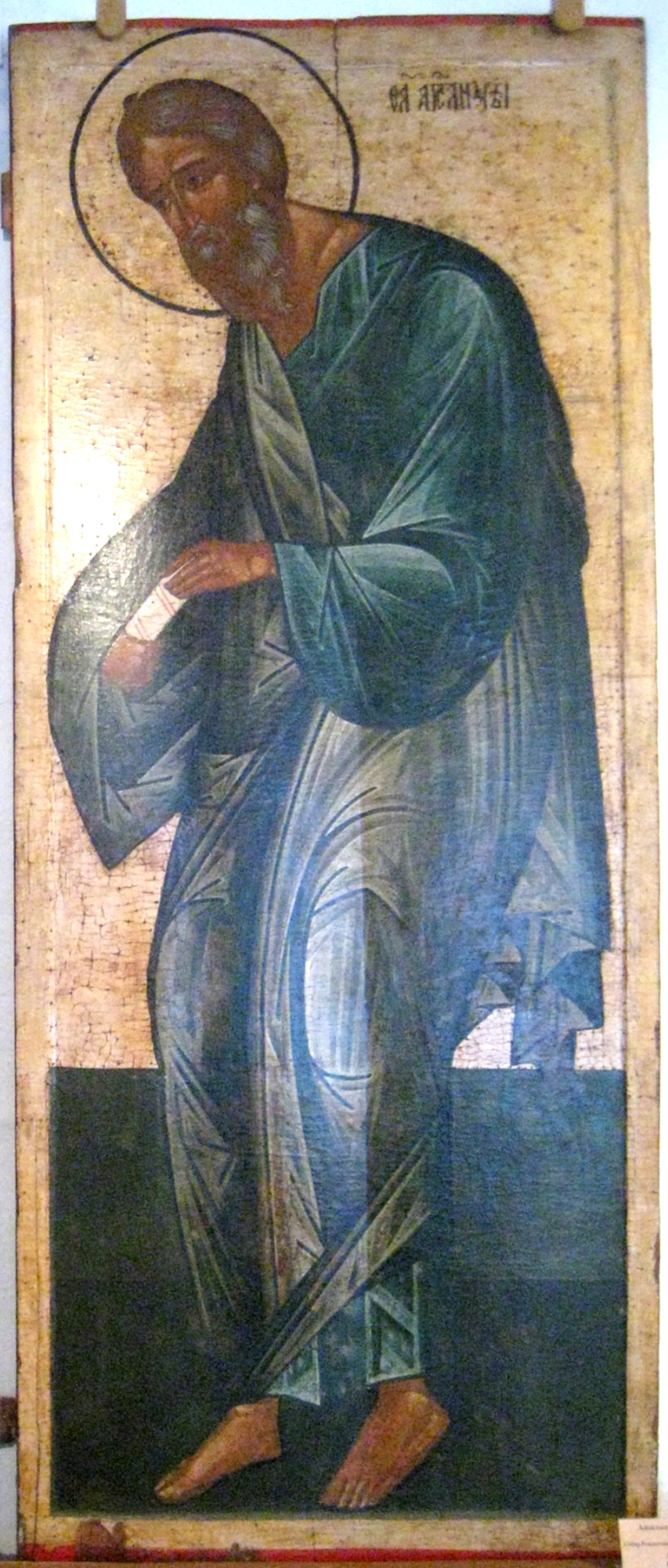
- Apostle Andrew
  Each patriarchate of Alexandria (the Greek Orthodox Church of Alexandria, the Coptic Catholic Church, and the Coptic Orthodox Church) states that it was founded by Mark the Evangelist.
- Each patriarchate of Antioch (the Greek Orthodox Church of Antioch, the Syriac Orthodox Church, the Maronite Church, the Melkite Greek Catholic Church, and the Syriac Catholic Church) states that it was founded by Simon Peter.
- The Greek Orthodox Patriarchate of Jerusalem states that it was founded by James the Just.
- Each patriarchate of Armenia (the Armenian Apostolic Church, based at Etchmiadzin, and the Armenian Catholic Church, whose patriarchal see is Cilicia but is based at Beirut) states that it was founded by the Apostles Bartholomew and Jude Thaddeus.
- The following bodies state they were founded by the Apostle Thomas: the Assyrian Church of the East, the Ancient Church of the East and the Chaldean Catholic Church, originating in or around Mesopotamia, and churches based in Kerala, India having Syriac roots and generically known as the Saint Thomas Christians: the Syro-Malabar Catholic Church, the Syro-Malankara Catholic Church, the Jacobite Syrian Christian Church, the Malankara Orthodox Syrian Church, Malabar Independent Syrian Church and the Mar Thoma Syrian Church.
- The Orthodox Tewahedo churches (the Ethiopian Orthodox Tewahedo Church and the Eritrean Orthodox Tewahedo Church) state that they were founded by Philip the Evangelist and Mark the Evangelist.
- The Orthodox Church of Georgia states that the Apostles Andrew and Simon the Zealot were its founders.
- The Orthodox Church of Cyprus, based at Nova Justiniana (Erdek), states that it was founded by the Apostles Paul and Barnabas.
- The Bulgarian Orthodox Church states that it has a connection with Andrew the Apostle, through the Ecumenical Patriarchate.
- The Russian Orthodox Church states that it has a connection with the Apostle Andrew, who is said to have visited the area where the city of Kyiv later arose. A similar belief is hold by the Orthodox Church of Ukraine.

Apostolic founders
Church	Andrew	Simon Peter	Paul	Barnabas	Philip	Mark	Simon	Thomas	James	Jude Thaddeus	Bartholomew	Notes
Latin Church		x	x									
Ecumenical Patriarchate of Constantinople	x											
Greek Orthodox Church of Alexandria						x						via Alexandria
Coptic Catholic Church						x						via Alexandria
Coptic Orthodox Church						x						via Alexandria
Greek Orthodox Church of Antioch		x										via Antioch
Syriac Orthodox Church		x										via Antioch
Maronite Church		x										via Antioch
Melkite Greek Catholic Church		x										via Antioch
Syriac Catholic Church		x										via Antioch
Armenian Apostolic Church										x	x	
Armenian Catholic Church										x	x	
Syro-Malabar Catholic Church								x				
Syro-Malankara Catholic Church								x				
Jacobite Syrian Christian Church								x				
Malankara Marthoma Syrian Church								x				
Malankara Orthodox Syrian Church								x				
Malabar Independent Syrian Church								x				
Assyrian Church of the East								x				
Ancient Church of the East								x				
Chaldean Catholic Church								x				
Eastern Orthodox Patriarchate of Jerusalem									x			
Ethiopian Orthodox Tewahedo Church					x	x						
Eritrean Orthodox Tewahedo Church					x	x						
Orthodox Church of Georgia	x						x					
Orthodox Church of Cyprus			x	x								
Bulgarian Orthodox Church	x											
Russian Orthodox Church	x											via Kyiv
Orthodox Church of Ukraine	x											via Kyiv

== Positions by Christian denomination ==
Teachings on the nature of apostolic succession vary depending on the Christian denomination, especially within various Protestant churches as certain Evangelical-Lutheran and Anglican bodies affirm the doctrine, while others such as the Plymouth Brethren, reject it.

=== Catholic Church ===
Wherefore we must obey the priests of the Church who have succession from the Apostles, as we have shown, who, together with succession in the episcopate, have received the mark of truth according to the will of the Father; all others, however, are to be suspected, who separated themselves from the principal succession.

— Irenaeus

In Catholic theology, the doctrine of apostolic succession is that the apostolic tradition—including apostolic teaching, preaching, and authority—is handed down from the college of apostles to the college of bishops through the laying on of hands, as a permanent office in the entirety of the Church. Historically, this has been understood as a succession in office, a succession of valid ordinations, or a succession of the entire college. It is understood as a sign and guarantee that the Church, both local and universal, is in diachronic continuity with the apostles; a necessary but insufficient guarantor thereof.

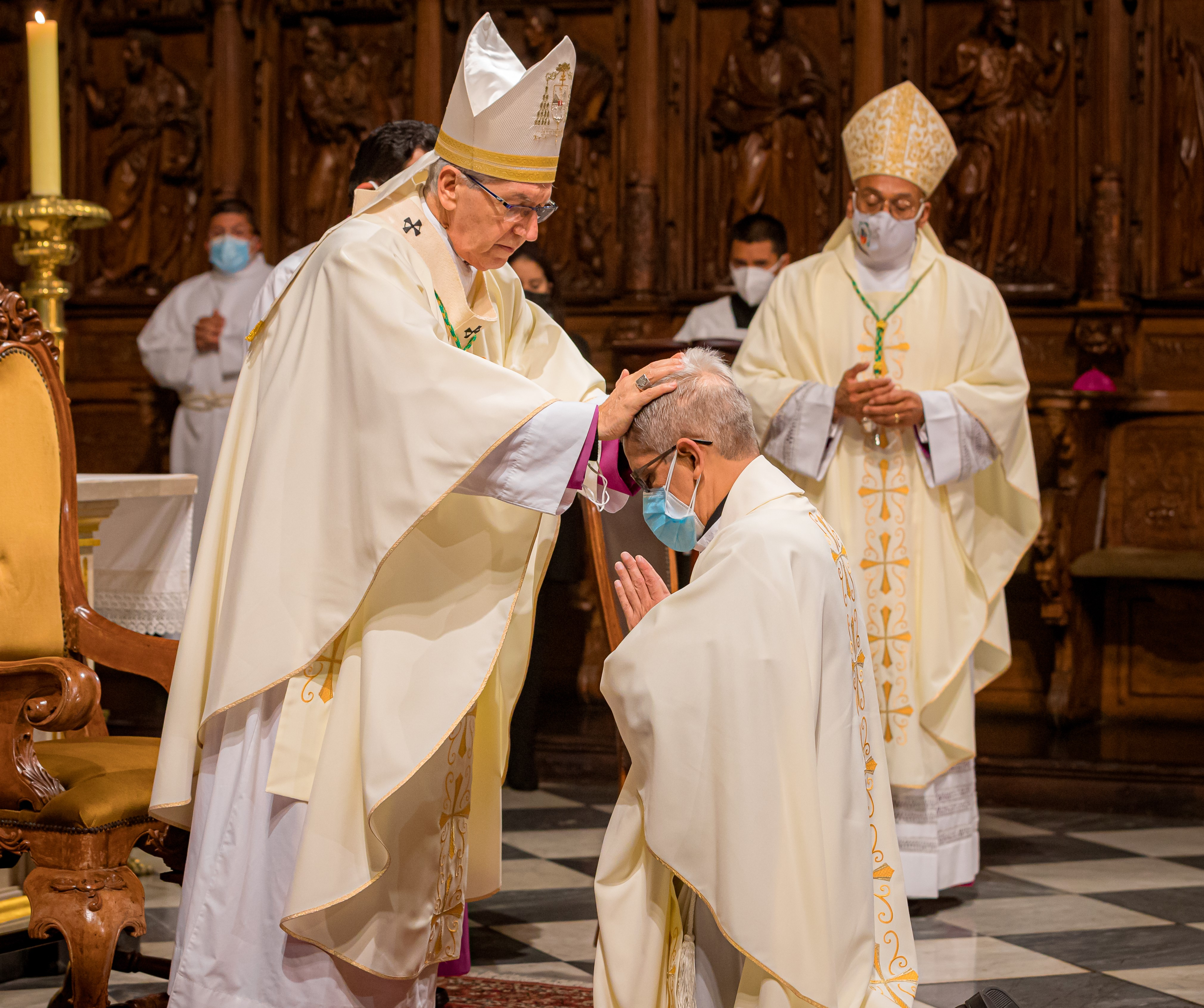
Catholic episcopal ordination ceremony of Guillermo Cornejo

Papal primacy is different though related to apostolic succession as described here. The Catholic Church has traditionally claimed a unique leadership role for the Apostle Peter, believed to have been named by Jesus as head of the Twelve Apostles and as a focus of their unity, who became the first Bishop of Rome, and whose successors inherited the role and accordingly became the leaders of the worldwide Christian Church as well. Even so, Roman Catholicism acknowledges the papacy is built on apostolic succession, not the other way around. As such, apostolic succession is a foundational doctrine of authority in the Catholic Church.

If the very order of episcopal succession is to be considered, how much more surely, truly, and safely do we number them from Peter himself, to whom, as to one representing the whole Church, the Lord said, 'Upon this rock I will build my Church'....

— Matthew 16:18

Peter was succeeded by Linus, Linus by Clement, Clement by Anacletus, Anacletus by Evaristus..." The Catholic position is summarised this way: "The Lord says to Peter: 'I say to you,' he says, 'that you are Peter, and upon this rock I will build my Church, and the gates of hell will not overcome it ....' On him [Peter] he builds the Church, and to him he gives the command to feed the sheep, and although he assigns a like power to all the apostles, yet he founded a single chair [cathedra], and he established by his own authority a source and an intrinsic reason for that unity.... If someone [today] does not hold fast to this unity of Peter, can he imagine that he still holds the faith? If he [should] desert the chair of Peter upon whom the Church was built, can he still be confident that he is in the Church"?

Roman Catholicism holds that Christ entrusted the apostles with the leadership of the community of believers, and the obligation to transmit and preserve the "deposit of faith". The experience of Christ and his teachings contained in the doctrinal tradition handed down from the time of the apostles and the written portion, which is Scripture. The apostles then passed on this office and authority by ordaining bishops to follow after them.

Roman Catholic theology holds that the apostolic succession affects the power and authority to administer the sacraments except for baptism and matrimony. Baptism may be administered by anyone and matrimony by the couple to each other. Authority to so administer such sacraments is passed on only through the sacrament of holy orders, a rite by which a priest is ordained. Ordination can be conferred only by bishop. The bishop must be from an unbroken line of bishops stemming from the original apostles selected by Jesus Christ. Thus, apostolic succession is necessary for the valid celebration of the sacraments.

==== Views concerning other churches ====
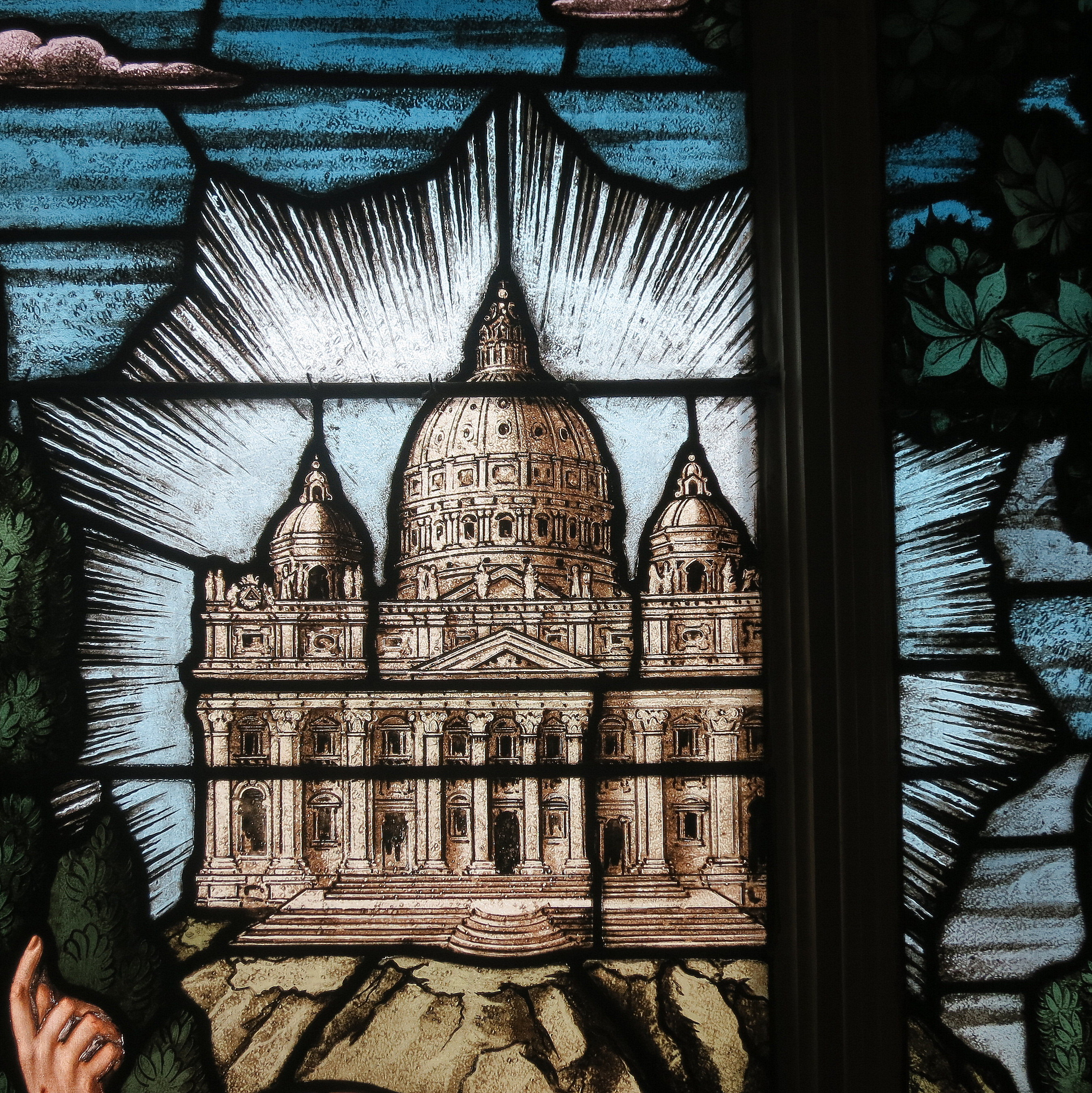
Stained glass window in a Catholic church depicting St. Peter's Basilica in Rome sitting "Upon this rock," a reference to Matthew 16:18. Most present-day Catholics interpret Jesus as saying he was building his church on the rock of the Apostle Peter and the succession of popes which claim Apostolic succession from him.

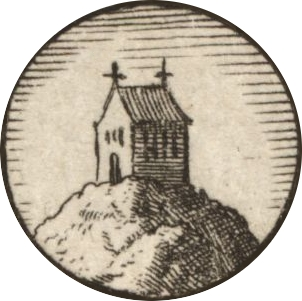
A 17th century illustration of Article VII: Of the Church from the Lutheran Augsburg Confession, which states "...one holy Church is to continue forever. The Church is the congregation of saints, in which the Gospel is rightly taught and the Sacraments are rightly administered." Here the rock from Matthew 16:18 refers to the preaching and ministry of Jesus as the Christ, a view discussed at length in the 1537 Treatise.

Currently, Roman Catholics recognize the validity of the apostolic successions of the bishops, and therefore the rest of the clergy, of the Eastern Orthodox, Oriental Orthodox, Church of the East, Old Catholics (except the ordination of women), and the Polish National Catholic Church. The lack of apostolic succession through bishops is the primary basis on which most Protestant denominations—barring some like Lutherans and Anglicans—are not called churches, in the proper sense, by the Orthodox and Roman Catholic churches, the latter referring to them as "ecclesial communities" in the official documents of the Second Vatican Council.

In the Catholic Church, Pope Leo XIII stated in his 1896 bull Apostolicae curae that the Catholic Church believes specifically that Anglican orders were to be considered "absolutely null and utterly void".

His argument was as follows. First, the ordination rite of Edward VI had removed the language of a sacrificial priesthood. Ordinations using this new rite occurred for over a century and, because the restoration of the language of "priesthood" a century later in the ordination rite "was introduced too late, as a century had already elapsed since the adoption of the Edwardine Ordinal ... the Hierarchy had become extinct, there remained no power of ordaining". With this extinction of validly ordained bishops in England, "the true Sacrament of Order as instituted by Christ lapsed, and with it the hierarchical succession". As a result, the pope's final judgment was that Anglican ordinations going forward were to be considered "absolutely null and utterly void". Anglican clergy were from then on to be ordained as Roman Catholic priests upon entry into the Catholic Church.

A reply from the archbishops of Canterbury and York (1896) was issued to counter Pope Leo's arguments: Saepius officio: Answer of the Archbishops of Canterbury and York to the Bull Apostolicae Curae of H. H. Leo XIII. They argued that if the Anglican orders were invalid, then the Roman orders were as well since the pope of Rome based his case on the fact that the Anglican ordinals used did not contain certain essential elements but these were not found in the early Roman rites either. Catholics argue, this argument does not consider the sacramental intention involved in validating holy orders. In other words, Catholics believe that the ordination rites were reworded so as to invalidate the ordinations because the intention behind the alterations in the rite was a fundamental change in Anglican understanding of the priesthood.

It is Roman Catholic doctrine that the teaching of Apostolicae curae is a truth to be "held definitively, but are not able to be declared as divinely revealed", as stated in a commentary by the Congregation for the Doctrine of the Faith. Cardinal Basil Hume explained the conditional character of his ordination of Graham Leonard, former Anglican bishop of the Diocese of London, to the priesthood in the following way: "While firmly restating the judgement of Apostolicae Curae that Anglican ordination is invalid, the Catholic Church takes account of the involvement, in some Anglican episcopal ordinations, of bishops of the Old Catholic Church of the Union of Utrecht who are validly ordained. In particular and probably rare cases the authorities in Rome may judge that there is a 'prudent doubt' concerning the invalidity of priestly ordination received by an individual Anglican minister ordained in this line of succession".

At the same time, he stated: "Since the church must be in no doubt of the validity of the sacraments celebrated for the Roman Catholic community, it must ask all who are chosen to exercise the priesthood in the Catholic Church to accept sacramental ordination in order to fulfill their ministry and be integrated into the apostolic succession". Since Apostolicae curae was issued many Anglican jurisdictions have revised their ordinals, bringing them more in line with ordinals of the early Church.

Timothy Dufort, writing in The Tablet in 1982, attempted to present an ecumenical solution to the problem of how the Catholic Church might accept Anglican orders without needing to formally repudiate Apostolicae curae at all. Dufort argued that by 1969 all Anglican bishops had acquired apostolic succession fully recognized by Rome, since from the 1930s Old Catholic bishops (the validity of whose orders the Vatican has never questioned) have acted as co-consecrators in the ordination of Anglican bishops. This view has not yet been considered formally by the Holy See, but after Anglican bishop Graham Leonard converted to Catholicism, he was only reordained in 1994 conditionally because of the presence of Old Catholic bishops at his ordination. There was also the formation of the Order of Corporate Reunion, which was an Anglo-Papalist institution conditionally ordaining Anglicans.

The question of the validity of Anglican orders has been further complicated by the Anglican ordination of women. In a document it published in July 1998, the Congregation for the Doctrine of the Faith stated that the Catholic Church's declaration on the invalidity of Anglican ordinations is a teaching that the church has definitively propounded and that therefore every Catholic is required to give "firm and definitive assent" to this matter. This being said, in May 2017, Cardinal Francesco Coccopalmerio—president of the Pontifical Council for Legislative Texts—has asked whether the current Roman Catholic position on invalidity could be revised in the future.

=== Eastern Orthodox ===
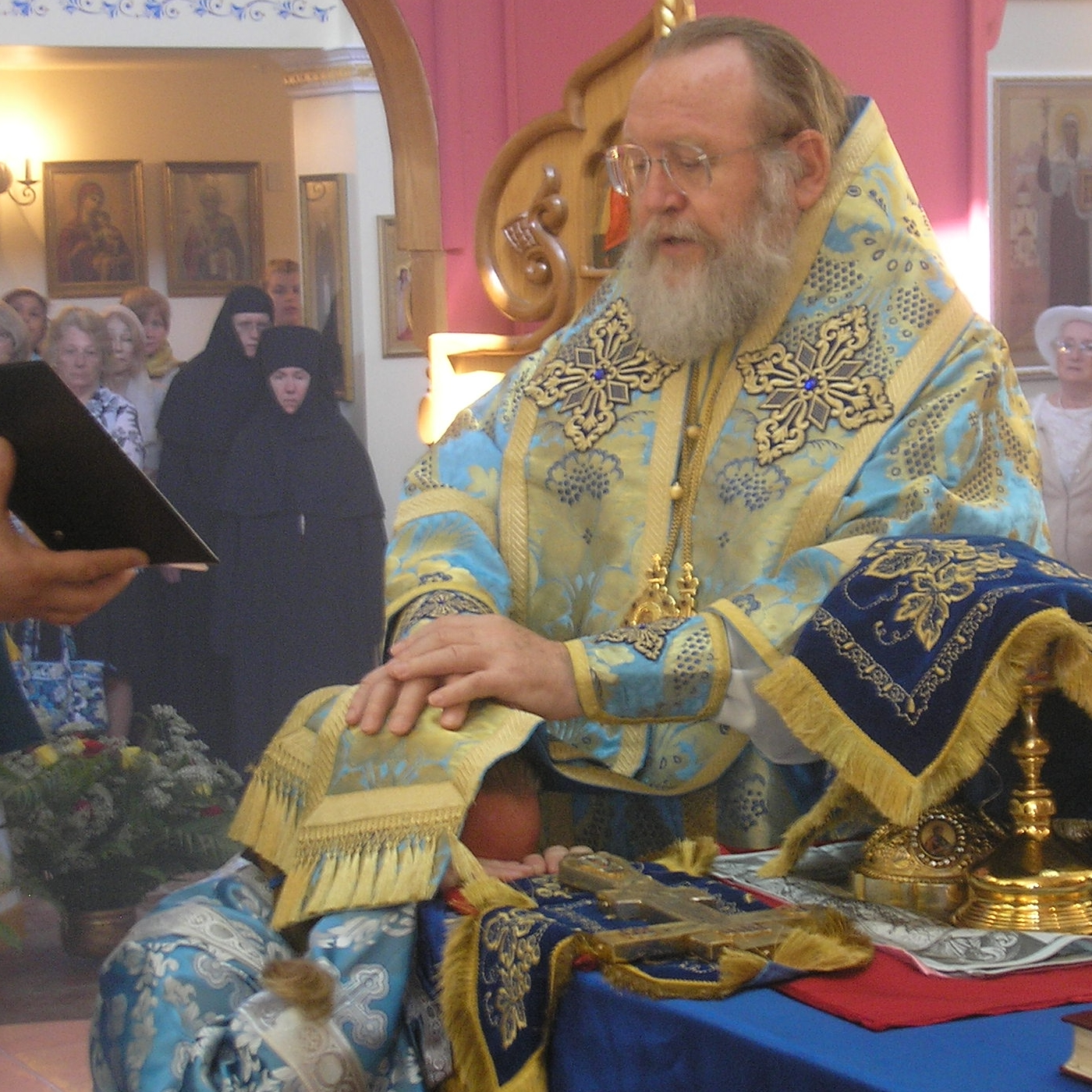
Ordination of an Orthodox priest by laying on of hands. Orthodox Christians view apostolic succession as an important, God-ordained mechanism by which the structure and teaching of the Christian Church are perpetuated.

While Eastern Orthodox sources often refer to the bishops as "successors of the apostles" under the influence of Scholastic theology, strict Eastern Orthodox ecclesiology and theology hold that all legitimate bishops are properly successors of Peter. This also means that presbyters (or "priests") are successors of the apostles. As a result, Eastern Orthodox theology makes a distinction between a geographical or historical succession and proper ontological or ecclesiological succession. Hence, the bishops of Rome and Antioch can be considered successors of Peter in a historical sense on account of Peter's presence in the early community. This does not imply that these bishops are more successors of Peter than all others in an ontological sense. The Eastern Orthodox generally recognize Roman Catholic clerical orders as being of apostolic lineage; but have a different concept of the apostolic succession as it exists outside the canonical borders of the Eastern Orthodox Church, extending the term only to bishops who have maintained communion, received ordination from a line of apostolic bishops, and preserved the catholic faith once delivered through the apostles and handed down as holy tradition.

For example, Fr. John Morris of the Antiochian Orthodox Christian Archdiocese of North America, states that: "Apostolic Succession is not merely a historical pedigree, but also requires Apostolic Faith. This is because Apostolic Succession is not the private possession of a bishop, but is the attribute of a local Church. A bishop who goes in schism or is cast out of office due to heresy does not take his Apostolic Succession with him as a private possession". The validity of a priest or bishop's ordination is decided by each autocephalous Eastern Orthodox church.

==== Views concerning other churches ====
The Eastern Orthodox have often permitted non-Eastern Orthodox clergy to be rapidly ordained within their tradition as a matter of pastoral necessity and economia. Priests entering Eastern Orthodoxy from Oriental Orthodoxy and Roman Catholicism have usually been received by "vesting" and have been allowed to function immediately within Eastern Orthodoxy as priests. Recognition of Catholic orders by the Russian Orthodox Church was stipulated in 1667 by the Synod of Moscow, but this position is not universal within the entire, mainstream Eastern Orthodox communion.

In 1922 the Eastern Orthodox Ecumenical Patriarch of Constantinople recognised Anglican orders as valid, holding that they carry "the same validity as the Roman, Old Catholic and Armenian churches possess". In the encyclical "From the Oecumenical Patriarch to the Presidents of the Particular Eastern Orthodox churches", Meletius IV of Constantinople, the Ecumenical Patriarch of Constantinople, wrote: "That the Orthodox theologians who have scientifically examined the question have almost unanimously come to the same conclusions and have declared themselves as accepting the validity of Anglican Orders". Following this declaration, in 1923, the Greek Orthodox Patriarchate of Jerusalem, as well as the Greek Orthodox Church of Cyprus agreed by "provisionally acceding that Anglican priests should not be re-ordained if they became Orthodox"; in 1936, the Romanian Orthodox Church "endorsed Anglican Orders".

Succeeding judgements have been more conflicting. The Eastern Orthodox churches require a totality of common teaching to recognise orders and in this broader view find ambiguities in Anglican teaching and practice problematic. Accordingly, in some parts of the Eastern Orthodox Church, Anglican clergy who convert to Orthodoxy are reordained, rather than vested.

There are some Eastern Orthodox churches whose the autocephaly is disputed as they are seen as not "canonical" by the main communion and neither are the bishops not recognized; and thus their claim is often disputed though each autocephalous Eastern Orthodox body determines the validity of another. The ordination of Miraš Dedeić of the Montenegrin Orthodox Church by the Bulgarian Orthodox Church – Alternative Synod is not recognized by the mainline Serbian Church. The Abkhazian Orthodox Church reportedly only has an "interim bishop" as it lacks historic apostolic succession under the mainstream understanding, because of its isolation.

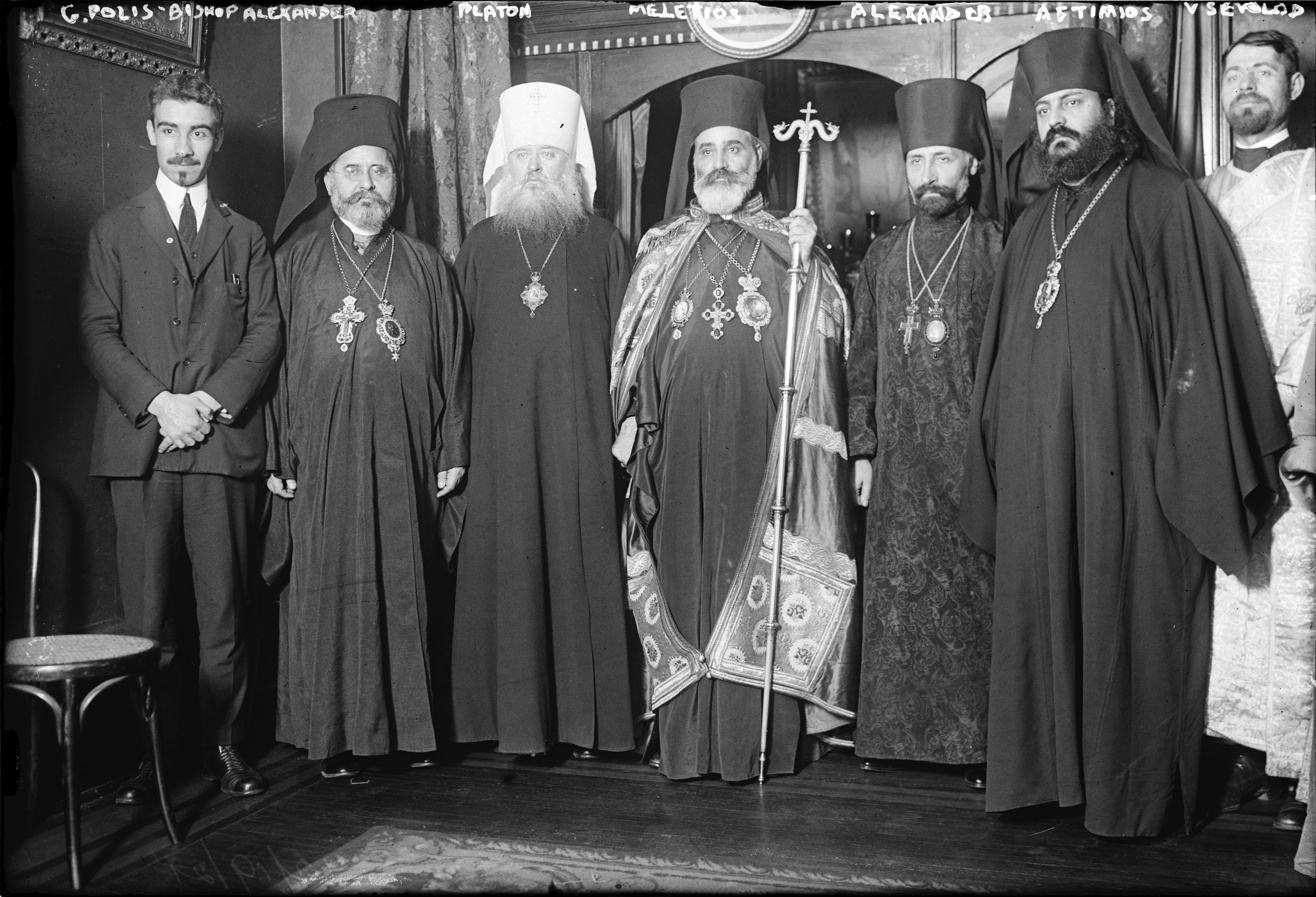
Archbishop Aftimios Ofiesh of the American Orthodox Catholic Church, at the 1921 pan-Orthodox gathering of bishops; he was the chief consecrator of Joseph Zuk.

There are, however, also historic instances of canonically disputed; defrocked and excommunicated; or canonically unrecognized clergy being recognized and/or received into the Eastern Orthodox churches without need for conditional ordination (e.g., Joseph Zuk of the Ukrainian Orthodox Church of the USA, Alexander Turner of the Antiochian Western Rite Vicariate, and Christopher Contogeorge of the Greek Orthodox Archdiocese of America, and Greek Orthodox Patriarchate of Alexandria; who were members of the American Orthodox Catholic Church).

In the 21st century, examples have included Philaret Denysenko and Epiphanius of the Kyiv Patriarchate; and prelates from the Ukrainian Autocephalous Orthodox Church being reinstated and recognized as canonical bishops by the Ecumenical Patriarchate. These exceptions have been considered analogous to an unofficial, universal recognition of sacramental character by the Ecumenical Patriarchate of Constantinople.

=== Oriental Orthodox Churches ===
Syriac Orthodox Patriarch Ignatius Jacob III and other Syrian Orthodox bishops following the consecreation of Baselios Augen I as the Catholicos of the East in 1964.

The Oriental Orthodox Churches uphold apostolic succession and the historical episcopate, and they also believe in sacramental character. The Armenian Apostolic Church, for example, recognises Catholic episcopal consecrations without qualification. In Oriental Orthodoxy Unveiled, a Coptic Orthodox theologian stated that the Oriental Orthodox Churches recognise baptisms, confirmations and ordinations from the Catholic and Eastern Orthodox churches.

=== Lutheran churches ===
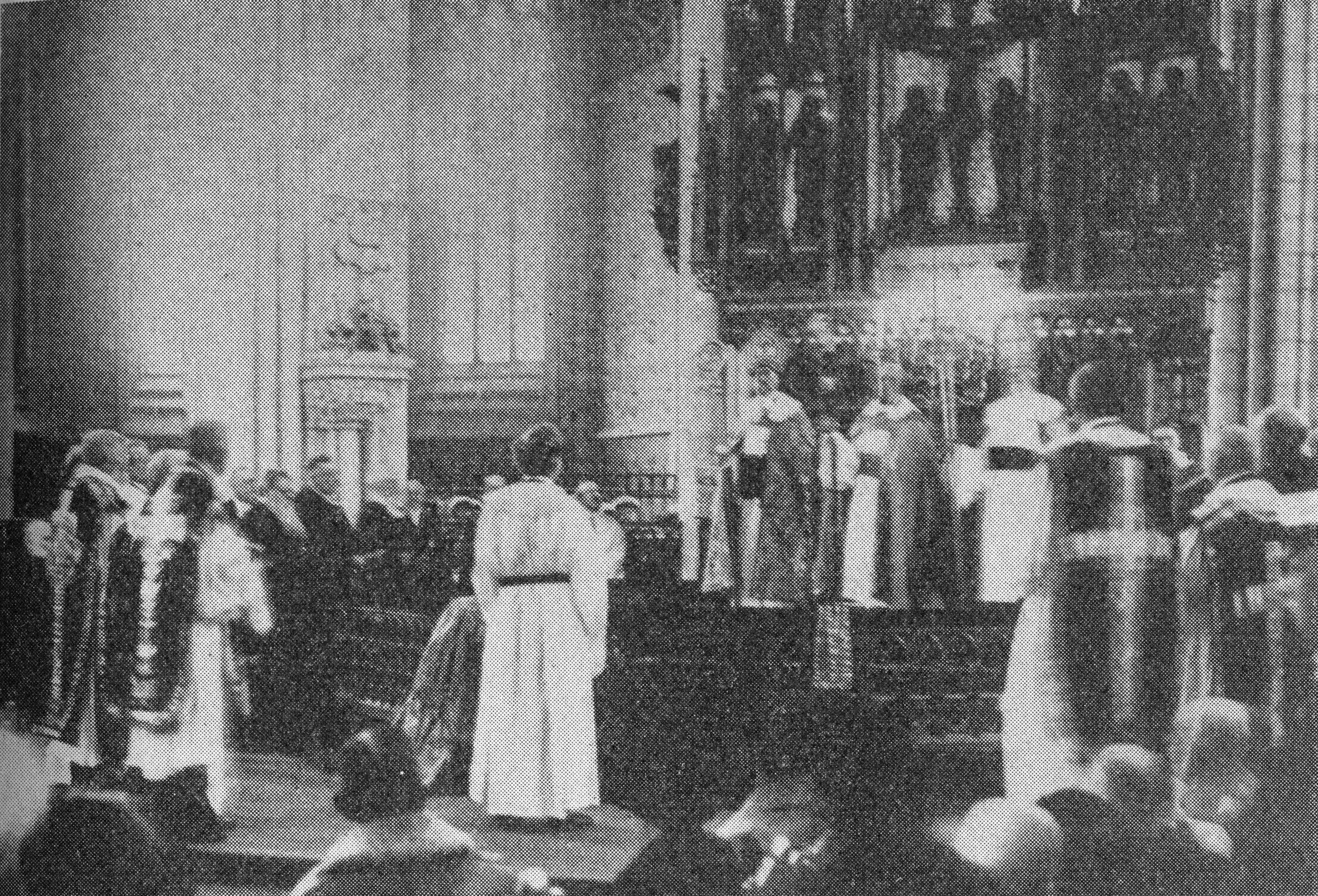
Nathan Söderblom is ordained as archbishop of the Church of Sweden, 1914.

Lutherans universally believe that "no one should publicly teach in the Church or administer the Sacraments unless he be regularly called". The Lutheran churches in Scandinavia, and those established in other parts of the world as a result of Scandinavian Lutheran missionary activity (such as the Evangelical Lutheran Church in Kenya), practice episcopal succession in which the bishop whose holy orders can be traced back for centuries performs ordinations.

On the other hand, certain Lutheran theologians—such as Arthur Carl Piepkorn—have held to the conception of a succession of presbyters in contradistinction to a succession of bishops. German Lutheran churches and their subsequent offspring in the United States practice succession of presbyters in which another priest is the one who confers the priesthood onto another. This low view results from the Prussian state-ordered union with Reformed (Calvinist) churches in 1817.

==== Nordic Lutheran churches ====
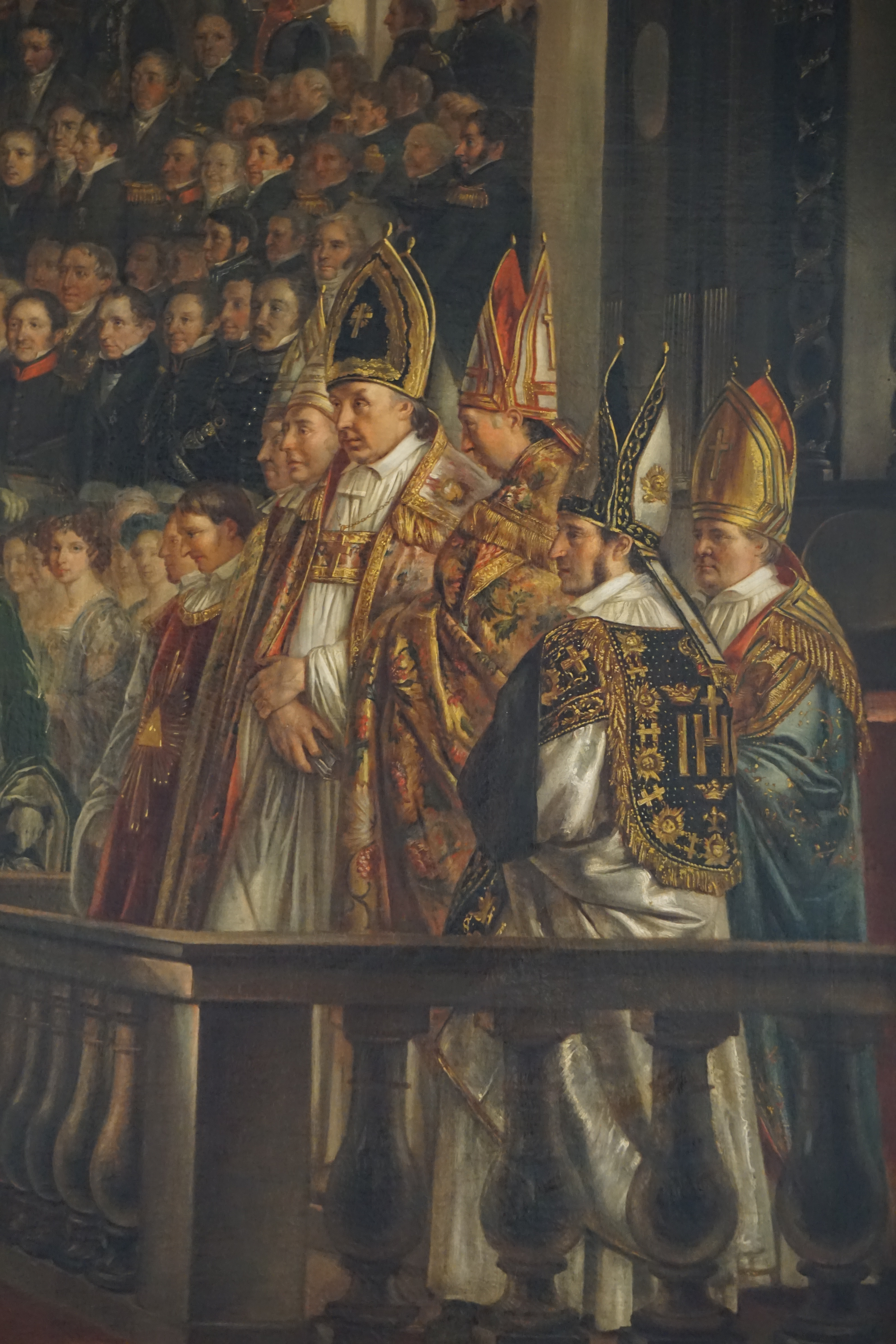
Karl XIV Johans kröning by Per Krafft the Younger (1818) depicting Evangelical-Lutheran bishops in Stockholm Cathedral

In Scandinavia and the Baltic region, Lutheran churches participating in the Porvoo Communion (those of Iceland, Norway, Sweden, Finland, Faroes, Estonia, and Lithuania), as well as non-Porvoo membership Lutheran churches in the region (including those of Latvia, and Russia), and the confessional Communion of Nordic Lutheran Dioceses, believe that they ordain their bishops in apostolic succession in lines stemming from the original apostles. The New Westminster Dictionary of Church History states: "In Sweden the apostolic succession was preserved because the Catholic bishops were allowed to stay in office, but they had to approve changes in the ceremonies".

What made the Church of Sweden an evangelical-catholic church was to Archbishop Söderblom the fact that the Reformation in Sweden was a 'church improvement' and a 'process of purification' which did not create a new church. As a national church, the Church of Sweden succeeded in bringing together medieval Swedish tradition with the rediscovery of the gospel which the Reformation brought with it. Archbishop Söderblom included the historic episcopate in the tradition-transmitting elements. The Church of Sweden was, according to Söderblom, in an even higher degree than the Anglican Church a via media. —Together in Mission and Ministry: The Porvoo Common Statement

The Lutheran Church of Finland was at that time one with the Church of Sweden and so holds the same view regarding the see of Åbo/Turku. The Evangelical Lutheran Church of Ingria claims succession through the Finnish Church and cites as a non-member the Porvoo Communion but emphasizes that "the succession of faith" is more important than the tactile apostolic succession.

In 2001, Francis Aloysius Sullivan wrote: "To my knowledge, the Catholic Church has never officially expressed its judgement on the validity of orders as they have been handed down by episcopal succession in these two national Lutheran churches." In 2007, the Holy See declared: "Christian Communities born out of the Reformation of the sixteenth century [...] do not enjoy apostolic succession in the sacrament of Orders, and are, therefore, deprived of a constitutive element of the Church." This statement speaks of the Protestant movement as a whole, not specifically of the Lutheran churches in Sweden and Finland. The 2010 report from the Roman Catholic – Lutheran Dialogue Group for Sweden and Finland, Justification in the Life of the Church, states: "The Evangelical-Lutheran churches in Sweden and Finland [...] believe that they are part of an unbroken apostolic chain of succession. The Catholic Church does however question how the ecclesiastical break in the 16th century has affected the apostolicity of the churches of the Reformation and thus the apostolicity of their ministry." Emil Anton interprets this report as saying that the Catholic Church does not deny or approve the apostolic succession directly, but will continue with further inquiries about the matter.

Negotiated at Järvenpää, Finland, and inaugurated with a celebration of the Eucharist at Porvoo Cathedral in 1992, the Porvoo Communion agreement of unity includes the mutual recognition of the traditional apostolic succession among the following churches:

- Lutheran churches: Evangelical Lutheran Church of Iceland, Church of Norway, Church of Sweden, Evangelical Lutheran Church of Finland, Estonian Evangelical Lutheran Church, Evangelical Lutheran Church of Lithuania, Church of Denmark and Lutheran Church in Great Britain
- Anglican Communion: Church of Ireland, Scottish Episcopal Church, Church of England, the Church in Wales, the Lusitanian Catholic Apostolic Evangelical Church, and the Spanish Reformed Episcopal Church

At least one of the Scandinavian Lutheran churches in the Porvoo Communion of churches—the Church of Denmark—has bishops, but strictly speaking they were not in the historic apostolic succession prior to their entry into the Porvoo Communion, since their episcopate and holy orders derived from Johannes Bugenhagen, who was a pastor, not a bishop. In 2010, the Church of Denmark joined the Porvoo Communion, after a process of mutual consecrations of bishops had led to the introduction of historic apostolic succession. The Lutheran Church in Great Britain also joined the Porvoo Agreement, in 2014. The Church of the Faroe Islands (itself an offspring of the Church of Denmark) joined in 2025.

In 2016, the Union of Utrecht of the Old Catholic Churches joined into full communion with the Lutheran Church of Sweden and mutually recognised their apostolic succession.

In Scandinavia, where High Church Lutheranism and Pietist Lutheranism has been highly influential, the Evangelical Lutheran Mission Diocese of Finland, Mission Province of the Church of Sweden, and the Evangelical Lutheran Diocese of Norway entered into schism with their national churches due to "the secularization of the national/state churches in their respective countries involving matters of both Christian doctrine and ethics"; these have altar and pulpit fellowship through the Communion of Nordic Lutheran Dioceses and are members of the confessional International Lutheran Council with their bishops having lines of apostolic succession from other traditional Lutheran churches, such as the Evangelical Lutheran Church in Kenya. The Mission Province teaches "episcopal succession", while underlining the importance of "doctrinal succession".

==== Other Lutheran claims to apostolic succession ====
In the High Church Lutheranism of Germany, certain Evangelical-Lutheran religious brotherhoods such as Hochkirchliche St. Johannes-Bruderschaft and Hochkirchlicher Apostolat St. Ansgar have managed to arrange for their own bishop to be re-ordained in apostolic succession. The members of these brotherhoods do not form into separate ecclesia.

The Evangelical Lutheran Church in America—North America's largest Lutheran body—gained apostolic succession through Lutheran bishops in the historic episcopate; this allowed for full communion with the Episcopal Church in 2000, upon the signing of Called to Common Mission. By this document, the full communion between the Evangelical Lutheran Church in America and the Episcopal Church was established. As such, "all episcopal installations in the Evangelical Lutheran Church in America take place with the participation of bishops in the apostolic succession". The Evangelical Lutheran Church in America is headed by a presiding bishop who is elected by the churchwide assembly for a six-year term.

The Evangelical Catholic Church, a Lutheran denomination of Evangelical Catholic churchmanship based in North America, taught:

The Evangelical Catholic Church sees Episcopal administration and Apostolic Succession as analogous to the formulation of the doctrines of the Trinity, Christology, Grace and the sacraments, i.e., a divinely willed, Spirit-directed development within The Church, the character of which is really and truly ecumenical because it took place uniformly both in the East and in the West. In the tripartition of the priestly office (deacon, priest, bishop) vibrates the triadic rhythm of the eternal divine life; in the monarchial bishop the ascended Christ, the invisible Head of The Church, becomes visible; and in the chain of bishops, consecrated by episcopal imposition of hands, the unbroken continuity is visualized, which unites The Church of the 21st Century with The Church of The Apostles. Thus the bonds of The Evangelical Catholic Church with those first days in Nazareth and Galilee remain unbroken, assured both by its faithful proclamation of The Gospel in all its apostolic purity and by its regular episcopal ordination of Bishops in Apostolic Succession. The Evangelical Catholic Church claims both a valid Apostolic Succession and a faithful transmission of The Gospel in all its truth and purity.

A number of Lutheran churches of Evangelical Catholic and High Church Lutheran churchmanships based in the Americas possess apostolic succession, with lineage generally being from Scandinavian Lutheran or Old Catholic lines. These include:

- The Lutheran Evangelical Protestant Church (LEPC) were some of the earliest Lutherans in America. They have autonomous and congregationally oriented ministries and consecrate male and female deacons, priests and bishops in apostolic succession with the laying on of hands during celebration of Word and Sacrament.
- The Lutheran Church - International is another North American Lutheran church that possesses and teaches the doctrine of apostolic succession.
- The Anglo-Lutheran Catholic Church recovered the apostolic succession from Old Catholic and Independent Catholic churches, and adopted a strict episcopal polity. All of its clergy have been ordained (or re-ordained) into the historic apostolic succession. This church was formed in 1997, with its headquarters in Kansas City, Missouri.
- The Lutheran Orthodox Church, founded in 2004 traces its historic lineage of apostolic succession through Lutheran, Anglican, and Old Catholic lines.

==== Indifference to the issue or rejection of the doctrine ====
Many German Lutherans appear to demur on this issue, which may be sourced in the church governance views of Martin Luther. Luther's reform movement usually did not abrogate the ecclesiastic office of bishop. During the Magisterial Reformation, the duties of the bishops were transferred to Imperial Estate who then acted as Summus episcopus. Likewise, elected Protestant bishops lost the apostolic succession in Catholic view and usually replaced their title with "administrator" when they married. Most of the remaining Protestant prince-bishoprics were secularized with the Peace of Westphalia. An important historical context to explicate the difference regarding apostolic succession among between the Scandinavian Lutheran churches and the German Lutheran churches is the Prussian Union of 1817, whereby the civil government directed the Lutheran churches in Prussia to merge with non-Lutheran Reformed Churches in Prussia. The Reformed (Calvinist) churches generally oppose on principle the traditional doctrine of ecclesiastic Apostolic Succession, e.g., not usually even recognising the church office of bishop. Later in the 19th century, other Lutheran and Reformed congregations merged to form united church bodies in some of the other 39 states of the German Confederation, e.g., in Anhalt, Baden, Bremen, Hesse and Nassau, Hesse-Kassel and Waldeck, and the Palatinate. Yet the partial nature of this list also serves to show that in Germany there remained many Lutherans who never united with the Reformed. According to the modern Evangelical Church in Germany, the ministry is transmitted by the congregation rather than from bishop to bishop. The Independent Evangelical-Lutheran Church, while comparing itself to Baltic churches, states that not the completeness of Apostolic succession lines but rather the "commitment to the historical continuity of the one, holy catholic and apostolic Church in its confession, its teaching and its expressions of life."

Other Lutheran churches are indifferent as a matter of doctrine regarding this particular issue of ecclesiastical governance. In America, the conservative Lutheran Church–Missouri Synod (LCMS) places its church authority in the congregation rather than in the bishop, and ordinations are typically performed by another pastor, although its founder, C. F. W. Walther, while establishing congregational polity for the LCMS, considered polity (a church's form of government) to be a matter of adiaphora (something indifferent).

Parts of Confessional Lutheranism have retained apostolic succession, such as the Mission Province (Missionsprovinsen), Evangelical Lutheran Church of Ingria and Evangelical Lutheran Church in Kenya, for example (see Lutheran churches); these are members of the International Lutheran Council. On the other hand, certain other Confessional Lutheran churches including Wisconsin Evangelical Lutheran Synod (WELS) and LCMS reject apostolic succession as a biblical doctrine. These churches teach that the Bible contains no evidence showing that the office must be conveyed by laying-on of hands and no Biblical command that it must be by a special class of bishops. The Wisconsin Evangelical Lutheran Synod teaches that there is no evidence the Roman popes have historic succession from Peter other than their own claim that it is so and states that there are a number of major problems with the Roman Catholic view on apostolic succession:

- There is no evidence the popes have historic succession to Peter other than their own claim that it is so.
- The bishops claiming succession have not preserved apostolic doctrine, therefore they have no meaningful apostolic succession.
- There is no evidence that the apostles were ordained by laying on of hands when they entered their office.
- There is no evidence in Scripture that the office must be conveyed by laying on of hands and no command that it must be by a special class of bishops.
- Acts 1 actually proves the opposite of what the Catholic Church claims; it proves there cannot be "apostolic successors" today because Judas' replacement had to be an eyewitness of Jesus' ministry.

=== Anglican Communion ===
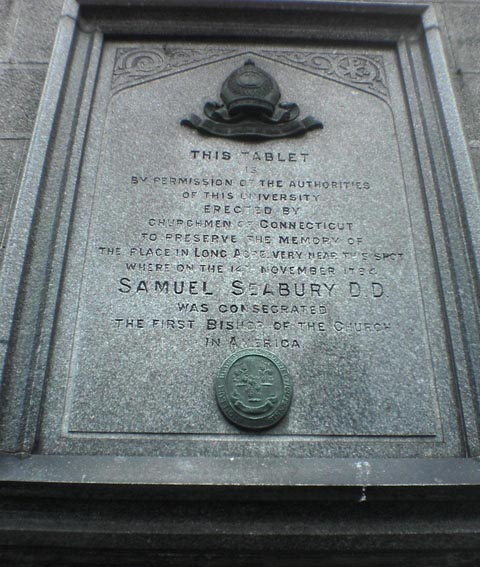
Tablet dedicated to the episcopal consecration of Samuel Seabury as the first Anglican bishop in the Americas

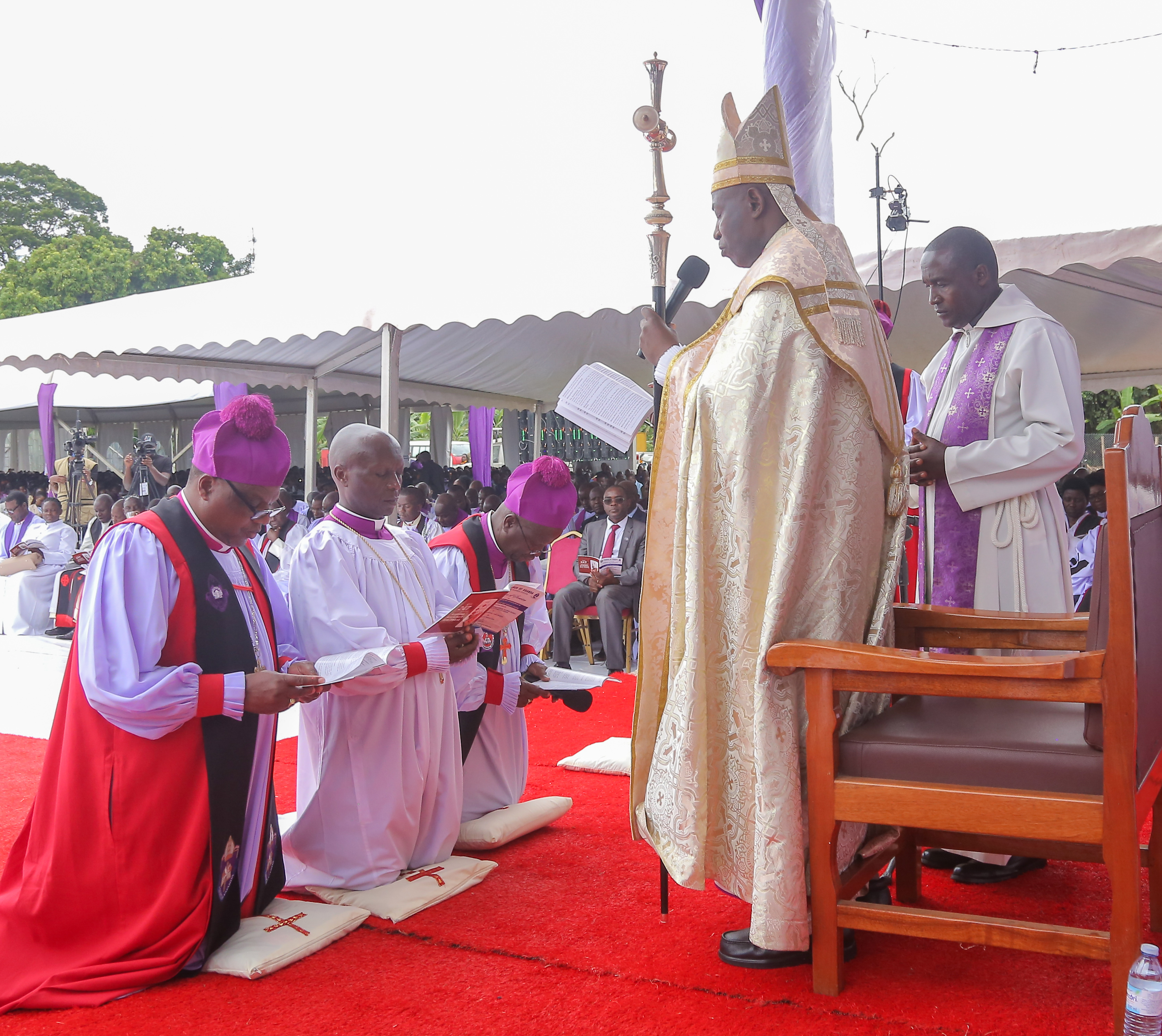
Episcopal consecration and enthronment of Gaster Nsereko as a diocesan bishop within the Church of Uganda

The Anglican Communion "has never officially endorsed any one particular theory of the origin of the historic episcopate, its exact relation to the apostolate, and the sense in which it should be thought of as God given, and in fact tolerates a wide variety of views on these points". Its claim to apostolic succession is rooted in the Church of England's evolution as part of the Western Church. Apostolic succession is viewed not so much as conveyed mechanically through an unbroken chain of the laying-on of hands, but as expressing continuity with the unbroken chain of commitment, beliefs and mission starting with the first apostles; and as hence emphasising the enduring yet evolving nature of the Christian Church.

When Henry VIII broke away from the jurisdiction of Rome in 1533/4, the English Church (Ecclesia Anglicana) claimed the episcopal polity and apostolic succession inherent in its Roman Catholic past. Reformed theology gained a certain foothold, and under his successor, Edward VI what had been an administrative schism—as the church under Henry was separated from Rome but remained essentially Catholic in its theology and practice—became a Protestant reformation under the guiding hand of Thomas Cranmer.

Although care was taken to maintain the unbroken sequence of episcopal consecrations—particularly in the case of Matthew Parker, who was consecrated archbishop of Canterbury in 1559 by two bishops who had been ordained in the 1530s with the Roman Pontifical and two ordained with the Edwardine Ordinal of 1550—apostolic succession was not seen as a major concern that a true ministry could not exist without episcopal consecrations: English Reformers such as Richard Hooker rejected the Roman position that apostolic succession is divinely commanded or necessary for true Christian ministry. American Episcopal theologian Richard A. Norris argues that the "foreign Reformed [Presbyterian] churches" were genuine ones despite the lack of apostolic succession because they had been abandoned by their bishops at the Reformation. The Church of England historically recognized as true churches the Continental Reformed churches, participating in the Synod of Dort in 1618–1619.

In very different ways both James II and William III of England made it plain that the Church of England could no longer count on the 'godly prince' to maintain its identity and traditions and the 'High Church' clergy of the time began to look to the idea of apostolic succession as a basis for the church's life. For William Beveridge (Bishop of St Asaph, 1704–8) the importance of this lay in the fact that Christ himself is "continually present at such imposition of hands; thereby transferring the same Spirit, which He had first breathed into His Apostles, upon others successively after them", but the doctrine did not really come to the fore until the time of the Tractarians.

In 1833, before his conversion to Catholicism, Newman wrote about the apostolic succession: "We must necessarily consider none to be really ordained who has not been thus ordained". After quoting this, Michael Ramsey continues: "With romantic enthusiasm, the Tractarians propagated this doctrine. In doing so they involved themselves in some misunderstandings of history and in some confusion of theology". He explained that they ascribed to early Anglican authors a far more exclusive version of the doctrine than was the case. They blurred the distinction between succession in office (Irenaeus) and succession in consecration (Augustine). They spoke of apostolic succession as the channel of grace in a way that failed to do justice to His gracious activity within all the dispensations of the New Covenant.

J. B. Lightfoot argued that monarchial episcopacy evolved upwards from a college of presbyters by the elevation of one of their number to be the episcopal president. A.C. Headlam laid great stress on Irenaeus' understanding of succession which had been lost from sight behind the Augustinian 'pipe-line theory'.

In the Church of England, some members who do not recognise women priests, therefore do not recognise priests ordained by women as part of the apostolic succession. The Society, of Saint Wilfrid and Saint Hilda, was formed by traditional catholic bishops within the Church of England. The Society "guarantee[s] a ministry in the historic apostolic succession in which they can have confidence"; i.e. a ministry of male priests who are ordained by male bishops at whose episcopal consecration a male bishop in the apostolic succession presided. There are even Anglican priests who do not accept the ministry of male bishops who have ordained women, even if that male bishop was himself validly ordained. This is called theology of taint.

=== Methodist churches ===
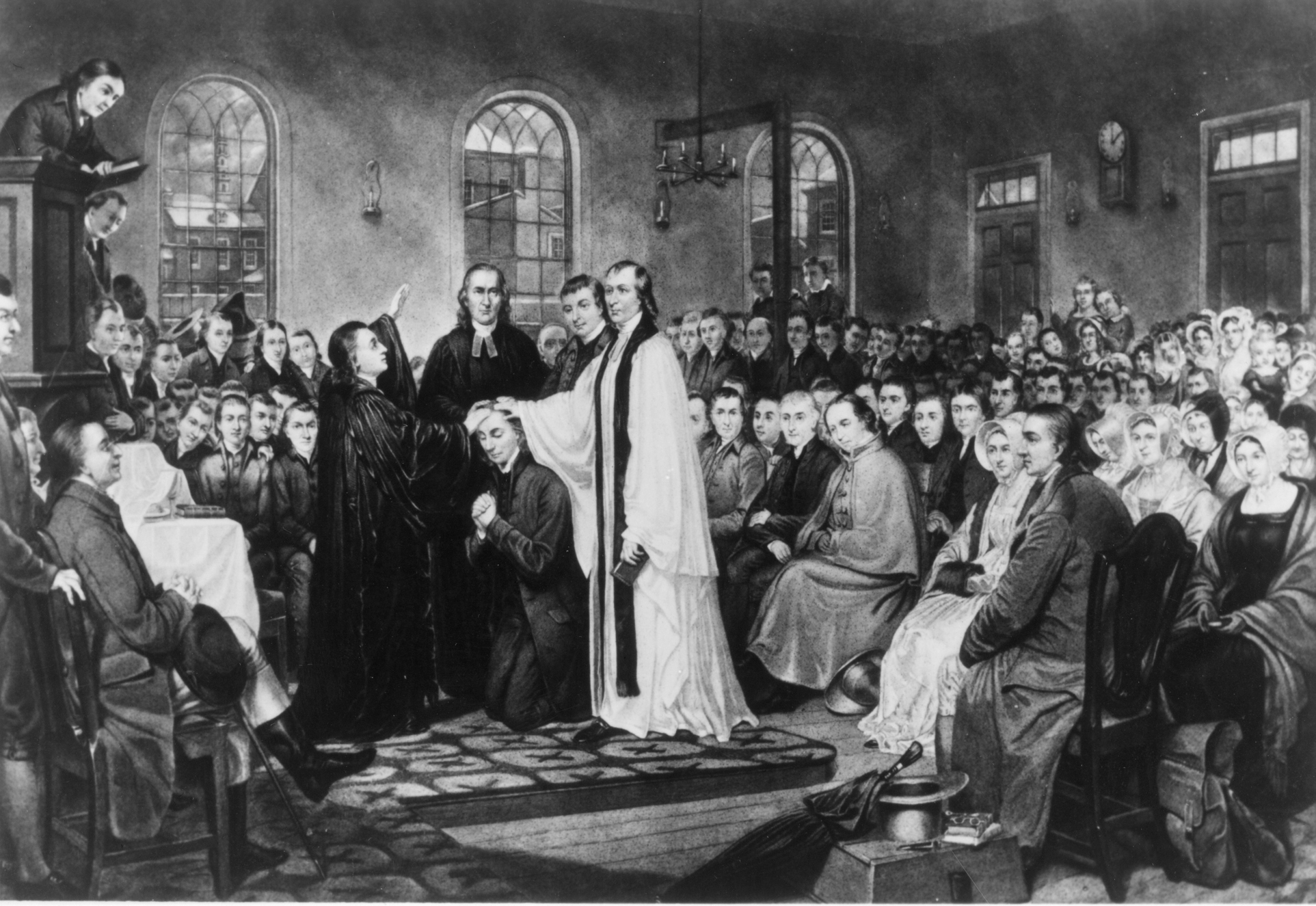
The ordination of Francis Asbury as bishop by Bishop Thomas Coke at the Christmas Conference of 1784 leading to the establishment of the Methodist Episcopal Church of the United States

In the beginnings of the Methodist movement, adherents were instructed to receive the sacraments within the Anglican Church since the Methodists were still a movement and not as yet a separate church in England until 1805. The American Methodists soon petitioned to receive the sacraments from the local preachers who conducted worship services and revivals. The Bishop of London refused to ordain Methodist priests and deacons in the British American colonies. John Wesley, the founder of the movement, was reluctant to allow unordained preachers to administer the sacraments:

We believe it would not be right for us to administer either Baptism or the Lord's Supper unless we had a commission so to do from those Bishops whom we apprehend to be in a succession from the Apostles.

— John Wesley, 1745

Some scholars argue that in 1763, Greek Orthodox bishop Erasmus of the Diocese of Arcadia, who was visiting London at the time, consecrated John Wesley a bishop, and ordained several Methodist lay preachers as priests, including John Jones. According to these arguments, Wesley could not openly announce his episcopal consecration without incurring the penalty of the Præmunire Act. In light of Wesley's alleged episcopal consecration, the Methodist Church could lay claim on apostolic succession, as understood in the traditional sense. Since John Wesley "ordained and sent forth every Methodist preacher in his day, who preached and baptized and ordained, and since every Methodist preacher who has ever been ordained as a Methodist was ordained in this direct 'succession' from Wesley, then the Methodist Church teaches that it has all the direct merits coming from apostolic succession, if any such there be".

Most Methodists view apostolic succession outside its high church sense. This is because Wesley believed that the offices of bishop and presbyter constituted one order, citing an ancient opinion from the Church of Alexandria; Jerome, a Church Father, wrote: "For even at Alexandria from the time of Mark the Evangelist until the episcopates of Heraclas and Dionysius the presbyters always named as bishop one of their own number chosen by themselves and set in a more exalted position, just as an army elects a general, or as deacons appoint one of themselves whom they know to be diligent and call him archdeacon. For what function, excepting ordination, belongs to a bishop that does not also belong to a presbyter"? (Letter CXLVI). John Wesley thus argued that for two centuries the succession of bishops in the Church of Alexandria, which was founded by Mark the Evangelist, was preserved through ordination by presbyters alone and was considered valid by that ancient church.

Since the Bishop of London refused to ordain ministers in the British American colonies, this constituted an emergency and as a result, on 2 September 1784, Wesley, along with a priest from the Anglican Church and two other elders, operating under the ancient Alexandrian habitude, ordained Thomas Coke a superintendent, although Coke embraced the title bishop.

Presently, the United Methodist Church follows this ancient Alexandrian practice as bishops are elected from the presbyterate; the Discipline of the Methodist Church, in ¶303, affirms that "ordination to this ministry is a gift from God to the Church. In ordination, the Church affirms and continues the apostolic ministry through persons empowered by the Holy Spirit." It also uses sacred scripture in support of this practice, namely, 1 Timothy 4:14, which states:

Neglect not the gift that is in thee, which was given thee by the laying on of the hands of the presbytery.

— St. Paul of Tarsus, KJV

The Methodist tradition also buttresses this argument with the leg of sacred tradition of the Wesleyan Quadrilateral by citing the Church Fathers, many of whom concur with this view.

In addition to the aforementioned arguments—or perhaps instead of them—in 1937 the annual Conference of the British Methodist Church located the "true continuity" with the Church of past ages in "the continuity of Christian experience, the fellowship in the gift of the one Spirit; in the continuity in the allegiance to one Lord, the continued proclamation of the message; the continued acceptance of the mission;..." [through a long chain which goes back to] "the first disciples in the company of the Lord Himself ... This is our doctrine of apostolic succession" [which neither depends on, nor is secured by,] "an official succession of ministers, whether bishops or presbyters, from apostolic times, but rather by fidelity to apostolic truth".

The Church of North India, Church of Pakistan and Church of South India are members of the World Methodist Council and the clergy of these three united Protestant churches possess lines of apostolic succession, according to the Anglican understanding of this doctrine, through the Church of India, Burma and Ceylon (CIBC), which finished merging with these three in the 1970s.

In June 2014, the Church of Ireland—a province of the Anglican Communion—extended its lines of historic apostolic succession into the Methodist Church in Ireland, as "the Archbishop of Dublin and Bishop of Down and Dromore took part in the installation of the new President of the Methodist Church of Ireland, the Rev. Peter Murray". In May 2014, the "Church of Ireland's General Synod approved an agreement signed with the Methodist Church that provided for the interchangeability of clergy, allowing an ordained minister of either church to come under the discipline and oversight of the other".

=== Moravian Church and Hussite Church ===
The Moravian Church teaches the doctrine of apostolic succession. The Moravian Church claims apostolic succession as a legacy of the old Unity of the Brethren. In order to preserve the succession, three Bohemian Brethren were consecrated bishops by Bishop Stephen of Austria, a Waldensian bishop who had been ordained by a Catholic bishop in 1434. These three consecrated bishops returned to Litice in Bohemia and then ordained other brothers, thereby preserving the historic episcopate.

On the other hand, the founder of the related Czechoslovak Hussite Church Karel Farský was ordained "presbyterially" and failed to gain an apostolic succession. Its decision to appoint its own priests and bishops without apostolic succession was a reason for the creation of the Orthodox Church of the Czech Lands and Slovakia. Debates surrounding apostolic succession continued to the 2000s with the unapproved ordination by António José da Costa Raposo of Antonín Jelínek.

=== Waldensian Church ===
Historically, the Waldensians were said to have bishops in apostolic succession. They developed their own theory that they were the real apostolic church instead of the Roman Catholic church and also saw itinerant preachers as part of the succession. The current Waldensian Evangelical Church does not have bishops and instead is "led by a group of individuals sharing collective responsibilities and tasks".

=== Reformed (Continental Reformed, Presbyterian, and Congregationalist) churches ===
The Reformed tradition (Continental Reformed, Congregationalist, Reformed Anglican and Presbyterian denominations) deny the doctrine of apostolic succession, believing that it is neither taught in Scripture nor necessary for Christian teaching, life, and practice. Accordingly, the Reformed churches strip the notion of apostolic succession from the definition of "apostolic" or "apostolicity". For them, to be apostolic is simply to be in submission to the teachings of the original twelve apostles as recorded in Scripture. This doctrinal stance reflects the Protestant view of authority, embodied in the doctrine known as sola scriptura.

Among the first who rejected the doctrine of episcopal apostolic succession was John Calvin. He said that the episcopacy was inadequate to address corruption, doctrinal or otherwise, and that this inadequacy justified the intervention of the church of lay people.

Jus Divinum Regiminis Ecclesiastici (English translation: The Divine Right of Church Government), which was promulgated by Presbyterian clergy in 1646, holds that historic ministerial succession is necessary for legitimate ministerial authority. It states that ministerial succession is conferred by elders through the laying on of hands, in accordance with 1 Timothy 4:14. The Westminster Assembly held that "There is one general church visible" and that "every minister of the word is to be ordained by imposition of hands, and prayer, with fasting, by those preaching presbyters to whom it doth belong".

English reformed idea of covenant was an active rejection the idea of apostolic succession which was supported by official Church of England. Instead of apostolic succession, the Congregationalist polity supports the idea of covenant succession, which stems from covenant theology. It relies on the idea that the children of believers are expected to succeed their parents in the faith, and that only someone from a covenanting community can establish a new church or settlement with a "right hand of fellowship". Puritans believed a true church consisted only of "visible saints" individuals who had experienced a personal conversion and were bound by a church covenant, and only "freemen" (male church members in full covenant) could vote or hold a valid office, rest of the members would be seen as being in half-way covenant which would not allow administrative decisions, that is why a succession from another covenanting community was required to be recognized by other congregational churches. Otherwise, a new church would be seen as suspicious if not outright in reprobation, one of such examples was Church of Rhode Island and Providence which was considered dissenters and their legitimacy was rejected constantly due to lack of a valid right hand of fellowship from a covenanting community. There were non-separating, as opposed to separatist "Pilgrims", Puritans such as in Massachusetts Bay Colony who still considered other Presbyterian and Anglican churches to be in covenant therefore considered them to be valid and their clergy not requiring an extra laying on of hands to be accepted to be in covenant, however they often came to disagree with other Congregationalists instead.

The Reformed Church in Hungary officially rejected the Catholic doctrine on apostolic succession on the Synod of Erdőd in 1545. Unlike other Reformed churches, the Synod of Tornya in 1550, reintroduced bishops (also translated as Superintendent). The 1561 Debrecen Confession clarified that ministers including other position like bishops were to be elected by the followers and bishops were then to be appointed by the secular princes additionally barring them from secular offices.

Max Thurian, a 20th-century ecumenist, said the Reformed concept of ministerial succession was that a "scriptural ordinance" that originated with the apostles as presbyters and their calling by Jesus, then passed down from presbyters to newly ordained presbyters.

=== Pentecostal and Charismatic churches ===
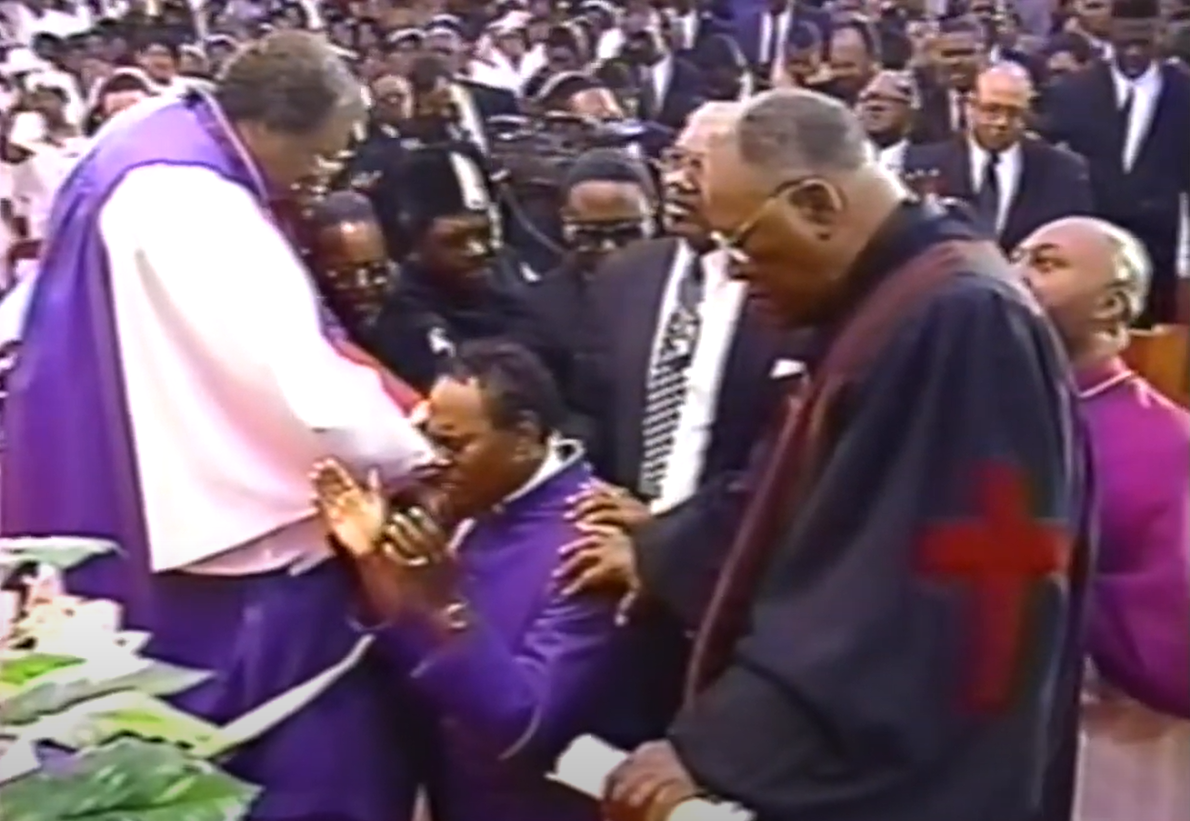
Episcopal consecration of Paul Morton in 1993, with George Augustus Stallings being one of the consecrators

Many Pentecostal Christians teach that "the sole guarantor of apostolic faith, which includes apostolic life, is the Holy Spirit". In addressing the Church of God General Assembly, Ambrose Jessup Tomlinson stated: "Although we do not claim a line of succession from the holy apostles, we do believe we are following in their example". There are nonetheless Pentecostals and Charismatics which claim to be in apostolic succession.

Within African-American Pentecostalism and Charismatic churches, the Pentecostal Churches of Christ, Full Gospel Baptist Church Fellowship, and Global United Fellowship teach and claim apostolic succession through J. Delano Ellis, Paul Morton, and Neil Ellis. Delano Ellis was a Oneness Pentecostal pastor consecrated by a bishop in 1970 within the United Holy Church of America (which lays no claims to historic apostolic succession); yet according to Catholic, Orthodox, and Anglican teachings, by his anti-Trinitarianism, he and those consecrated by him have lacked any theological continuity for being in historic apostolic succession. According to Ellis in The Bishopric – A Handbook on Creating Episcopacy in the African-American Pentecostal Church, he claims a "western stream" of succession through the Church of England, John Wesley, Thomas Coke, Francis Asbury, the Methodist Episcopal Church and the Church of God in Christ; and he claims an "eastern stream" of succession from the Syro-Chaldean Church. His claims to an "eastern stream" were repudiated as having never been conferred.

Morton—a former Church of God in Christ and National Baptist pastor—was consecrated in 1993 by the excommunicated Roman Catholic, George Augustus Stallings; Stallings was consecrated by an Independent Catholic bishop and later repudiated by the same, and then conditionally consecrated in 2006 by former a Roman Catholic archbishop—Emmanuel Milingo (none from Full Gospel nor Global United are in the Milingo successon).

After the conditional consecration was performed, Stallings, Milingo, and other participants including Independent Old Catholic archbishop Peter Paul Brennan, were excommunicated from the Roman Church. Through Morton and the Full Gospel Baptist Church Fellowship, Neil Ellis and the Global United Fellowship claimed apostolic succession and a historic episcopacy, although their clergy lacked a sacrificial priesthood and theological continuity in accordance with Roman Catholic dogma; and Stallings had been repudiated. Neil Ellis was consecrated in 1995 by Morton.

On 6 February 2003, K. J. Samuel, the moderator bishop of the Church of South India (a United Protestant denomination that holds membership worldwide Anglican Communion in addition to the World Communion of Reformed Churches), along with P.M. Dhotekar, bishop of Nagpur of the Church of North India, and Bancha Nidhi Nayak, bishop of Phulbani of the Church of North India, consecrated Pentecostal minister K. P. Yohannan as a bishop in Anglican lines of apostolic succession; K.P. Yohannan thereafter became the first metropolitan of the Believers Eastern Church, a Pentecostal denomination which acquired an episcopal polity of ecclesiastical governance.

=== Eastern Protestant churches ===
The Mar Thoma Syrian Church received a consecration by the Malabar Independent Syrian Church which led to a schism between the MISC and the other Oriental Orthodox churches. The St. Thomas Evangelical Church of India kept the episcopal structure of the MTSC. It was founded by 14 priests of the MTSC who elected and consecrated the first two bishops.

=== Independent sacramental and Convergence movements ===
The Communion of Evangelical Episcopal Churches traces its succession back to Roman Catholic, Armenian Orthodox, Nordic Lutheran, Anglican and Old Catholic lines. The Charismatic Episcopal Church emphasizes three "streams" of apostolic succession: apostolic faith/doctrine, authority and anointing.

The Philippine Independent Church had no apostolic succession as no bishops joined the church until 1948, when three bishops were consecrated by Norman S. Binsted of the Anglican Episcopal Church in the United States of America.

The Sedevacantist movement believes that the papacy is vacant and do not recognise any pope after the death of John XXIII. Some sedevacantist groups like the Congregation of Mary Immaculate Queen, the Society of Saint Pius V and the Palmarian Catholic Church trace their apostolic succession back to Ngô Đình Thục. The Catholic Church regards these consecrations as valid but illicit and while the bishops are excommunicated, they are bishops according to canon law.

Some Eastern Orthodox groups claim apostolic succession but their lineages are often disputed by the mainline churches. The Old Calendarist and True Orthodox churches: the Church of the Genuine Orthodox Christians of Greece (Chrysostomos Synod), Russian Orthodox Church Outside of Russia (Agathangel) and Old Calendar Orthodox Church of Romania, made a common declaration claiming their "indisputable Apostolic Succession". The Ecumenical Patriarchate of Constantinople however denies the apostolic succession of the Old Calendarists.

Groups which are part of the Continuing Anglican movement also claim apostolic succession. The Diocese of the Holy Cross, Anglican Church in America, Anglican Province of America and the Anglican Catholic Church declared their mutual recognition in 2017. The Orthodox Anglican Church traces itself through Old Catholic and Eastern Orthodox lines. Other churches upholding apostolic succession include the Traditional Anglican Church, the Holy Catholic Church Anglican Rite, and the United Episcopal Church of North America. In contrast, the Reformed Anglican Church argues that the early church did not function under modern Episcopalianism but rather that presbyters and bishops were originally equal.

Western Rite Orthodox and other unrecognised Orthodox churches in Western Europe like the Celtic Orthodox Church, the British Orthodox Church, and the Orthodox-Catholic Church of America, trace their lineages from the Syriac Orthodox Church usually through Jules Ferrette. The founder of the Lusitanian Catholic Orthodox Church was consecrated by Auxentius (Pastras) of the Church of the Genuine Orthodox Christians of Greece (Auxentius Synod).

=== Latter Day Saint movement ===
Denominations within the Latter Day Saint movement preach the necessity of apostolic succession and claim it through the process of restoration. According to their teaching, a period of universal apostasy followed the death of the Twelve Apostles. They also teach that without apostles or prophets left on the earth with the legitimate priesthood authority, many of the true teachings and practices of Christianity were lost. Those within this movement believe these were restored to the prophet Joseph Smith and various others in a series of divine conferrals and ordinations by angelic men who had held this authority during their lifetimes (see this partial list of restoration events). As it relates to apostolic succession, Joseph Smith and Oliver Cowdery said that the apostles Peter, James, and John appeared to them in 1829 and conferred upon them the Melchizedek priesthood, After its establishment, each subsequent prophet and leader of the church have received the authority passed down by the laying on of hands, or through apostolic succession; and with it "the keys of the kingdom, and of the dispensation of the fullness of times".

For the Church of Jesus Christ of Latter-day Saints (LDS Church), the largest denomination in the Latter-day Saint movement, apostolic succession involves the leadership of the church being established through the Quorum of the Twelve Apostles. Each time the President of the Church dies, the most senior apostle, who is designated as the President of the Quorum of the Twelve Apostles, is set apart as the new church president.

== Criticism ==
Some Protestants feel that such claims of apostolic succession are proven false by the differences in traditions and doctrines between these churches: many Roman Catholics and Eastern Orthodox consider both the Church of the East and the Oriental Orthodox churches to be heretical, having been anathematized in the early ecumenical councils of Ephesus (431) and Chalcedon (451), respectively. Churches that claim apostolic succession in ministry distinguish this from doctrinal orthodoxy, holding that "it is possible to have valid orders coming down from the apostles, and yet not to have a continuous spiritual history coming down from the apostles".

All Christians who have a genuine relationship with God through and in Christ are part of the "true Church", according to evangelical Protestant theology, notwithstanding condemnation of the Catholic Church by some Protestants. The propriety of the Christian Church as a temporal institution deriving its legitimacy from apostolic succession is greatly diminished under this theological view.

== See also ==
- Baptist successionism
- Defrocking
- Episcopi vagantes
- Historical episcopate, collective body of all the bishops of a group who are in valid apostolic succession
- Independent sacramental movement, Christian denominations which practice the historic sacramental rites independently including apostolic succession
- Lineage (Buddhism), a similar practice in Buddhist tradition
- List of bishops
- New Apostolic Church
- Restorationism
- Sedevacantism, the idea that the papacy is vacant
- Pope Linus
- Valid but illicit
