= Eric Jay =

British Anglican priest (1907–1989)

Eric George Jay (1 March 1907 – 7 February 1989) was a British Anglican priest, academic and author.

Jay was educated at the University of Leeds and the College of the Resurrection; and ordained in 1931. After a curacy in Stockport he was a lecturer at King's College London. He was a Chaplain in the RAFVR from 1940 until 1946 and priest in charge of St Clement Danes from 1945 until 1947. Dean of Nassau from 1948 to 1951. He was Senior Chaplain to the Archbishop of Canterbury from 1951 to 1958; Principal of the Montreal Diocesan Theological College from 1958 to 1964; and Dean of the Faculty of Divinity at McGill University from 1964 to 1970.

In 1937, Jay married Margaret Webb, and they had two daughters and a son. In 1957, aged eighteen, their elder daughter gave birth to a daughter who at Jay’s insistence was adopted. Becoming Sheila Caffell, she was later one of those who died in the White House Farm murders.

== Selected publications ==
Works by Jay include:

- The Existence of God (1946)
- Origen’s Treatise on Prayer (1954)
- New Testament Greek; an Introductory Grammar (1958)
- Son of Man, Son of God (1965)
- The Church: its changing image through twenty centuries (1977)
