= Lusitanian Catholic Orthodox Church =

Independent Christian denomination in Portugal

The Lusitanian Catholic Orthodox Church (Portuguese: Igreja Católica Ortodoxa Lusitana) is a Christian denomination in Portugal.

== Hierarchy ==
The Lusitanian Orthodox Church is headed by the Orthodox Archbishop of Braga and Lisbon, who is also Metropolitan Primate of Portugal, Spain and All Brazil.

== See also ==
- Ecclesiastical history of Braga
