= Syriac Orthodox Patriarch =

Syriac Orthodox Patriarch may refer to:

- Syriac Orthodox Patriarch of Antioch and All the East
  - List of Syriac Orthodox Patriarchs of Antioch
- Patriarch of Tur Abdin
