= Max Thurian =

Max Thurian (16 August 1921 in Geneva, Switzerland – 15 August 1996 in Geneva, Switzerland) was the subprior of the Taizé community, an ecumenical monastic community in France. He was the subprior at Taizé from the time of its inception in the 1940s.

During the Second Vatican Council, he was invited by Pope Paul VI to observe the liturgical reform of the Catholic Mass. In 1969 he expressed that he was satisfied with the reforms of the council. On 12 May 1988, Thurian converted to Catholicism and was ordained a priest. On 24 July 1996, he published an article in L'Osservatore Romano in which, while maintaining his complete approval for the liturgical reform, he lamented that in its practical implementation there was a risk that the Mass would lose "its character of mystery".
