= Apostolic throne =

Quality of some ancient Christian jurisdictions

In Christianity, the concept of an apostolic throne refers to one of the historic patriarchates that was associated with a specific apostle. Not all of the apostles are associated with specific "thrones"; in general, the phrase applies to apostles who presided over a specific geographic church. Notably, there is no apostolic throne associated with St. Paul, who along with St. Peter was present, at different times, in both Antioch and Rome (where both Peter and Paul were crucified). The phrase is also somewhat interchangeable with an "apostolic see".

== Apostolic thrones ==
- Saint James the Just is associated with the apostolic throne of Jerusalem.
- Both the pope and the patriarchs of Antioch are considered to occupy the apostolic throne of St. Peter, as Peter presided over the early church from those locations.
  - The pope occupies the apostolic throne of St. Peter in Rome
  - Eastern churches occupy the apostolic throne of St. Peter in Antioch. These include the patriarchs of the Syriac Orthodox Church and the Greek Orthodox Church of Antioch
- The Coptic and Greek Orthodox patriarchs of Alexandria (also known as the Pope of Alexandria) consider themselves as occupying the throne of St. Mark the Evangelist, who founded the Alexandrian church.
- The historical Church of the East and consequently the Catholicos of the Assyrian Church of the East and recently the Patriarch of the Ancient Church of the East consider themselves also as successors of St.Thomas, a belief that was previously held by the Maphrain of the Syriac orthodox church.
- Both the primates of Malankara Orthodox Syrian Church and the Malankara Mar Thoma Syrian Church consider themselves to occupy the throne of St. Thomas the apostle
- The Catholicos of All Armenians of the Armenian Apostolic Church and consequently also the Armenian Catholicos of the Great House of Cilicia (Holy See of Cilicia) and the Patriarchate of Cilicia of the Armenian Catholic Church all consider themselves as occupying the throne of both St. Jude the Apostle (also known as St. Thaddaeus) and St. Bartholomew.
- Saint John was himself associated with the apostolic throne of Ephesus, although this apostolic see has been canonically vacant since 1922.

== Other thrones ==
The See of Milan claimed the apostle Barnabas as its founder, but this was disputed. Nonetheless, this apostolic throne was later occupied by the important bishop Ambrose, who was the mentor of Augustine of Hippo.

The archbishop of Canterbury is installed in St. Augustine's Chair, referring to the first holder of that office, Augustine of Canterbury, not to be confused with the earlier theologian and bishop Augustine of Hippo.

== See also ==
- Patriarchate
- Episcopal See
