= Episcopal polity =

Hierarchical form of church governance

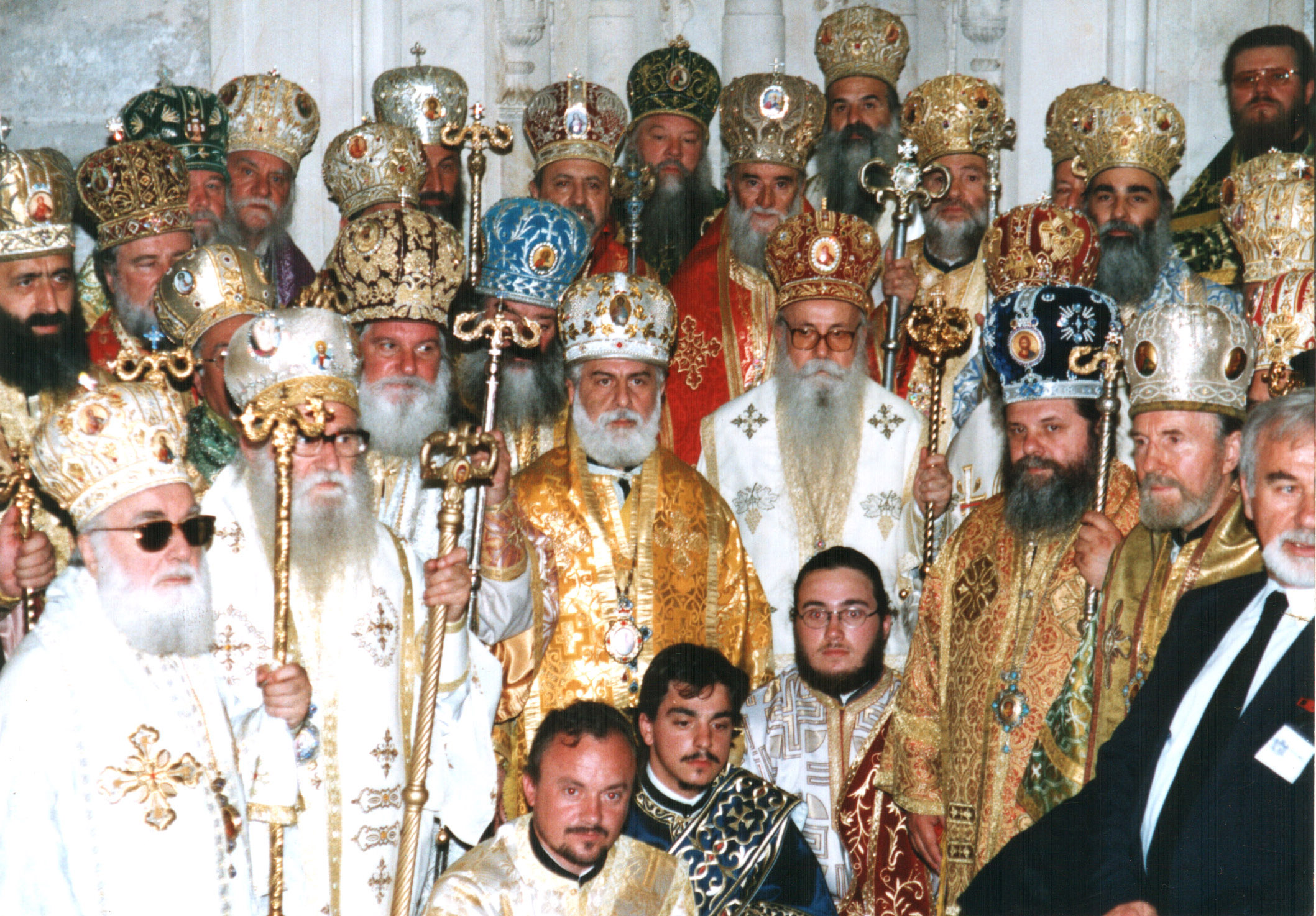
A congregation of Eastern Orthodox bishops assembled in Jerusalem at 2000.

An episcopal polity, also known as episcopalianism, is a hierarchical form of church governance in which the chief local authorities are called bishops. The word "bishop" here is derived via the Vulgar Latin term episcopus, from Ancient Greek ἐπίσκοπος (epískopos) 'overseer'. It is the structure used by many of the major Christian churches and denominations, such as the Catholic, Eastern Orthodox, Oriental Orthodox, Church of the East, Anabaptist, Lutheran, and Anglican churches or denominations, and other churches founded independently from these lineages. Many Methodist denominations have a form of episcopal polity known as connexionalism.

== History ==
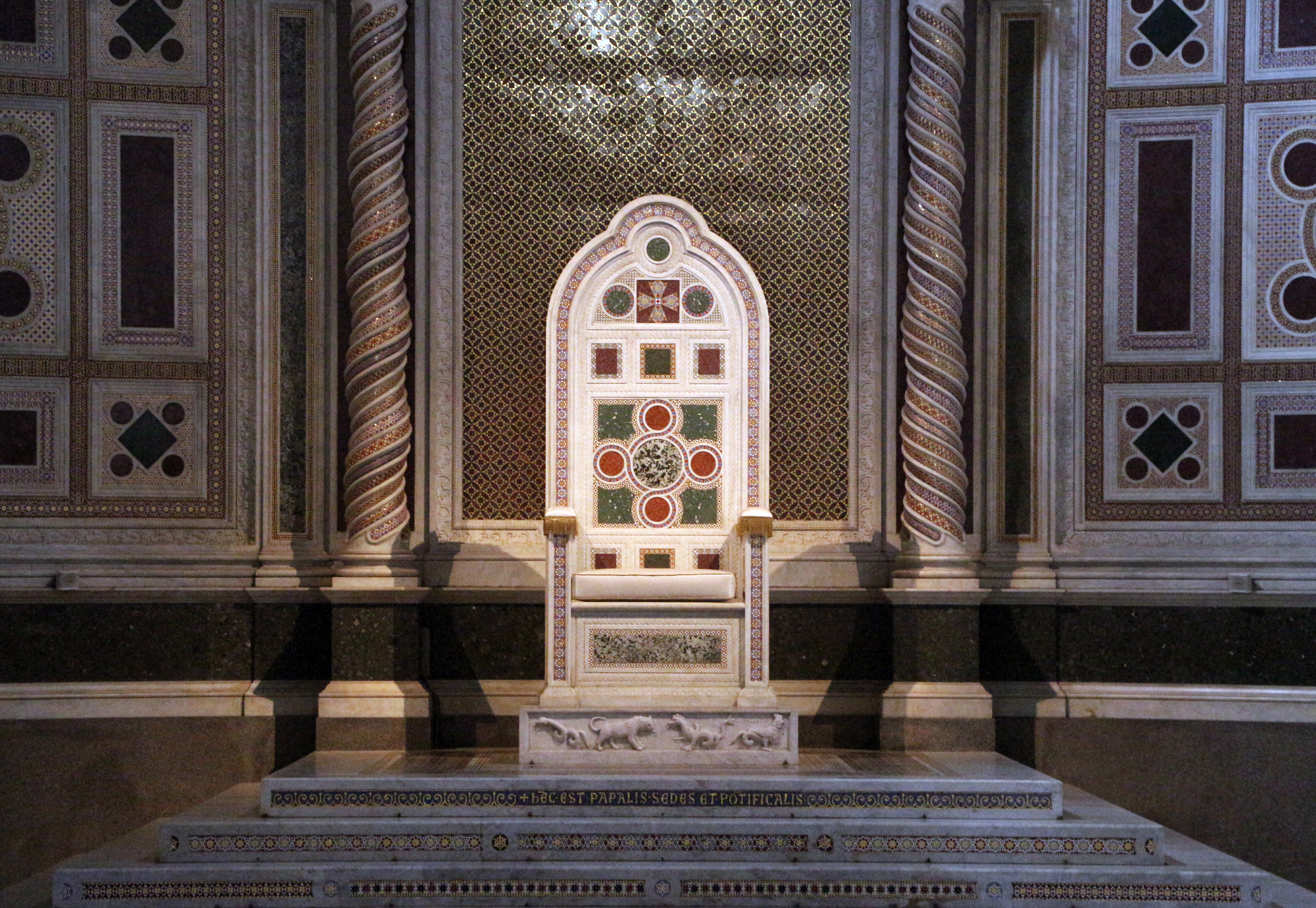
The cathedra of the Bishop of Rome in the Archbasilica of Saint John Lateran. For the proto-orthodox Christians of the Great Church, living under the Roman Empire in addition to the those in Sasanid Empire and Aksumite Empire, the Roman bishop was regarded to have authority over others based on the primacy of Peter, as represented by his Pontifical Chair. The prestige enjoined to Rome at that time was significantly different from the Catholic doctrine of papal supremacy, developed centuries later.

Churches with an episcopal polity are governed by bishops, practising their authorities in the dioceses and conferences or synods. Their leadership is both sacramental and constitutional: as well as performing ordinations, confirmations, and consecrations, the bishop supervises the clergy within a local jurisdiction and is the representative both to secular structures and within the hierarchy of the church.

Bishops are considered to derive their authority from an unbroken, personal apostolic succession from the Twelve Apostles of Jesus. Bishops with such authority are said to represent the historical episcopate or historic episcopate. Churches with this type of government usually believe that the church requires episcopal government as described in the New Testament (see 1 Timothy 3 and 2 Timothy 1). In some systems, bishops may be subject in limited ways to bishops holding a higher office (variously called archbishops, metropolitans, or patriarchs, depending upon the tradition). They also meet in councils or synods. These gatherings, subject to presidency by higher ranking bishops, usually make important decisions, though the synod or council may also be purely advisory.

For much of the written history of institutional Christianity, episcopal government was the only known form of church organization. This changed at the Reformation. Many Protestant churches are now organized by either congregational or presbyterian church polities, both descended from the writings of John Calvin, a Protestant reformer working and writing independently following the break with the Catholic Church precipitated by The Ninety-Five Theses of Martin Luther. However, some people have disputed the episcopal polity before the Protestant Reformation, such as Aerius of Sebaste in the 4th century.

== Overview of episcopal churches ==
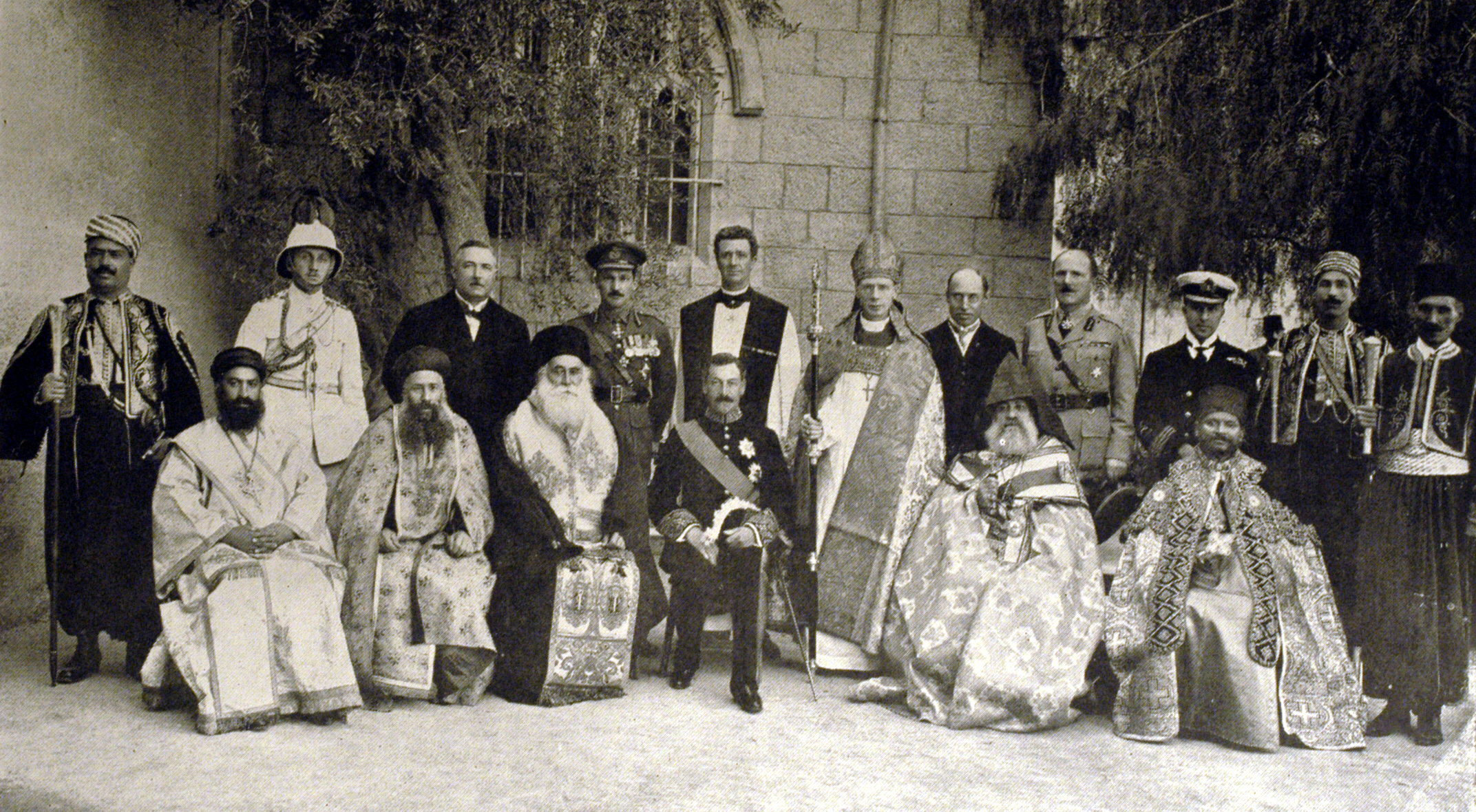
A 1922 meeting between British administrative officials and various Christian leaders of Jerusalem. Seated in the middle is Sir Herbert Samuel. On his left, from L to R are seated bishops representing the Coptic Orthodox, Syriac Orthodox and Eastern Orthodox churches. To his right, from L to R are situated the Anglican bishop who is standing beside Samuel while the Armenian Apostolic and Ethiopian Orthodox bishops remain seated. Catholic representation is missing in this delegation

The definition of the word episcopal has variation among Christian traditions. There are subtle differences in governmental principles among episcopal churches at the present time. To some extent the separation of episcopal churches can be traced to these differences in ecclesiology, that is, their theological understanding of church and church governance. For some, "episcopal churches" are churches that use a hierarchy of bishops who identify as being in an unbroken, personal apostolic succession.

"Episcopal" is also commonly used to distinguish between the various organizational structures of denominations. For instance, "Presbyterian" (Greek: πρεσβύτερος, presbýteros) is used to describe a church governed by a hierarchy of assemblies of elected elders, referred to as presbyterian polity. Similarly, "episcopal" is used to describe a church governed by bishops. Self-governed local congregations, governed neither by elders nor bishops, are usually described as "congregational".

More specifically, the capitalized appellation "Episcopal" is applied to several churches historically based within Anglicanism ("Episcopalianism"), including those still in communion with the Church of England.

Using these definitions, examples of specific episcopal churches include:

- The Catholic Church
- The Eastern Orthodox Church
- The Oriental Orthodox Churches
- The Assyrian Church of the East
- The Malankara Mar Thoma Syrian Church
- The Anglican Communion
- The Old Catholic churches
- The Independent Catholic churches
- Certain national churches of the Lutheran confession
- The African Methodist Episcopal Church
- The United Methodist Church

Some Lutheran churches practice congregational polity or a form of presbyterian polity. Others, including the Church of Sweden, practice episcopal polity; the Church of Sweden also counts its bishops among the historic episcopate. This is also the case with some American Lutheran churches, such as the Anglo-Lutheran Catholic Church, Lutheran Orthodox Church, Lutheran Church - International, and the Lutheran Episcopal Communion.

Many Methodist churches (the United Methodist Church, among others) retain the form and function of episcopal polity, although in a modified form, called connexionalism. Since all trace their ordinations to an Anglican priest, John Wesley, it is generally considered that their bishops do not share in apostolic succession. However, United Methodists affirm that their bishops share in the historic episcopate.

== Formation ==
A wall paintaing from the ruined Faras cathedral in Sudan depicting Peter standing behind the bishop of Faras, thus explaining the principle of apostolic succession

The Apostle Paul in the Epistle to the Philippians, Clement of Rome and the Didache when talking about the ecclesial system of governance, mention "bishops and deacons", without the word "presbyter", which has been argued by some to show that there was no presbyter-bishop distinction yet in the first century.

Ignatius of Antioch, writing in already the early second century, makes a clear distinction of bishops and presbyters, meaning that his letters show that an episcopal system was already in existence by his time. However, Bart Erhman sees it as significant that Ignatius never mentioned a bishop in Rome. Later, Tertullian also very clearly distinguishes the presbyters and bishops as a separate office, Irenaeus made lists of the succession of bishops, though such lists made by the early Church Fathers are highly contradictory. By the second century, it appears that the episcopal system had become the majority, universal view among Christians.

Thus episcopal polity became a hallmark of the proto-orthodox Christians belonging to the Pauline form who viewed apostolic succession as a legitimising factor, as opposed to groups like Gnostics, Marcionites and Judaizers. Even schismatic sects that developed later such as the Arians and Donatists would also use the episcopal framework, except for Aerius of Sebaste, who contested the system and began his own sect.

Jerome stated that churches were originally governed by a group of presbyters, only later electing bishops to suppress schisms.

== Catholic Church ==
19th century German illustration showing vestments associated with various bishopric positions in the Latin Church. Bishops of the Eastern Catholic Churches retain the vestments of from their respective parent churches.

The Catholic Church has an episcopate, with the Pope, who is the Bishop of Rome, at the top. The Catholic Church considers juridical oversight over the church is not a power derived from human beings, but strictly from the authority of Christ, which was given to his twelve apostles. The See of Rome, as the unbroken line of apostolic authority descending from Peter the Apostle (the "Prince and Head of the Apostles"), is a visible sign and locus of communion among the College of Bishops, and therefore also of local churches around the world. In communion with these churches and their bishops, the Pope has all legitimate juridical and infallible teaching authority over the whole church. This authority given by Jesus to Peter and the Apostles is transmitted from one generation to the next by the power of the Holy Spirit, through the laying on of hands from the Apostles to the bishops, in unbroken succession.

== Eastern Orthodox Church ==
Vestments during other times

Vestments for choir in Greek tradition

Vestments for choir in Slavonic tradition

Vestment (including mitre and pallium) for Divine Liturgy

Vestments of an Eastern Orthodox bishop

The conciliar idea of episcopal government continues in the Eastern Orthodox Church. In Eastern Orthodoxy, all autocephalous primates are seen as collectively gathering around Christ, with other archbishops and bishops gathering around them, and so forth. There is no single primate with exclusive authority comparable to the Pope in Rome. However, the Patriarch of Constantinople (now Istanbul) is seen as the primus inter pares, the "first among equals" of the autocephalous churches of Eastern Orthodoxy.

== Oriental Orthodox Churches ==
Vestment of a Syriac Orthodox bishop

An Armenian Apostolic bishop as illustrated in a 17th century manuscript from Iran

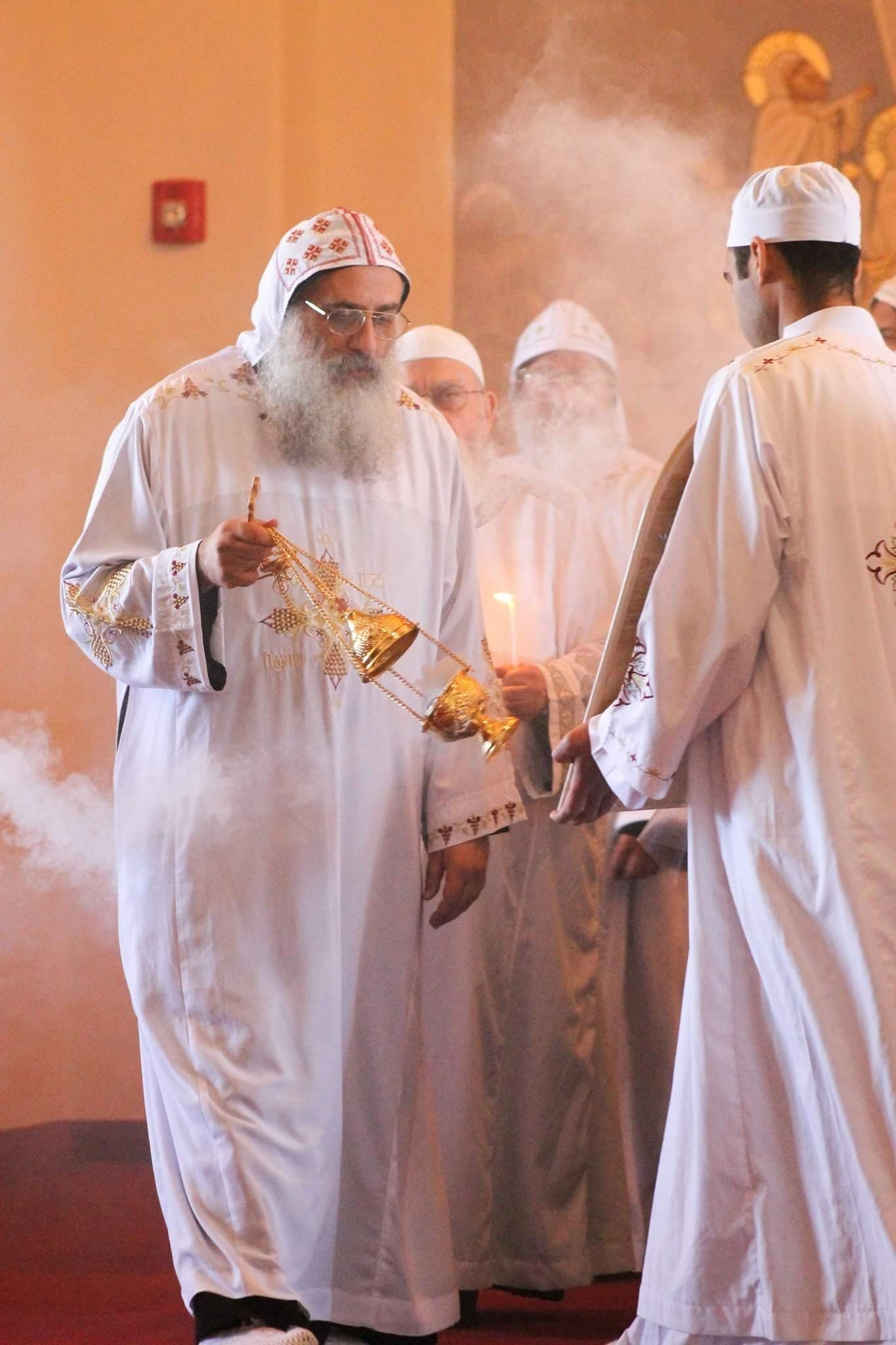
Coptic Orthodox bishop Abraham in Los Angeles

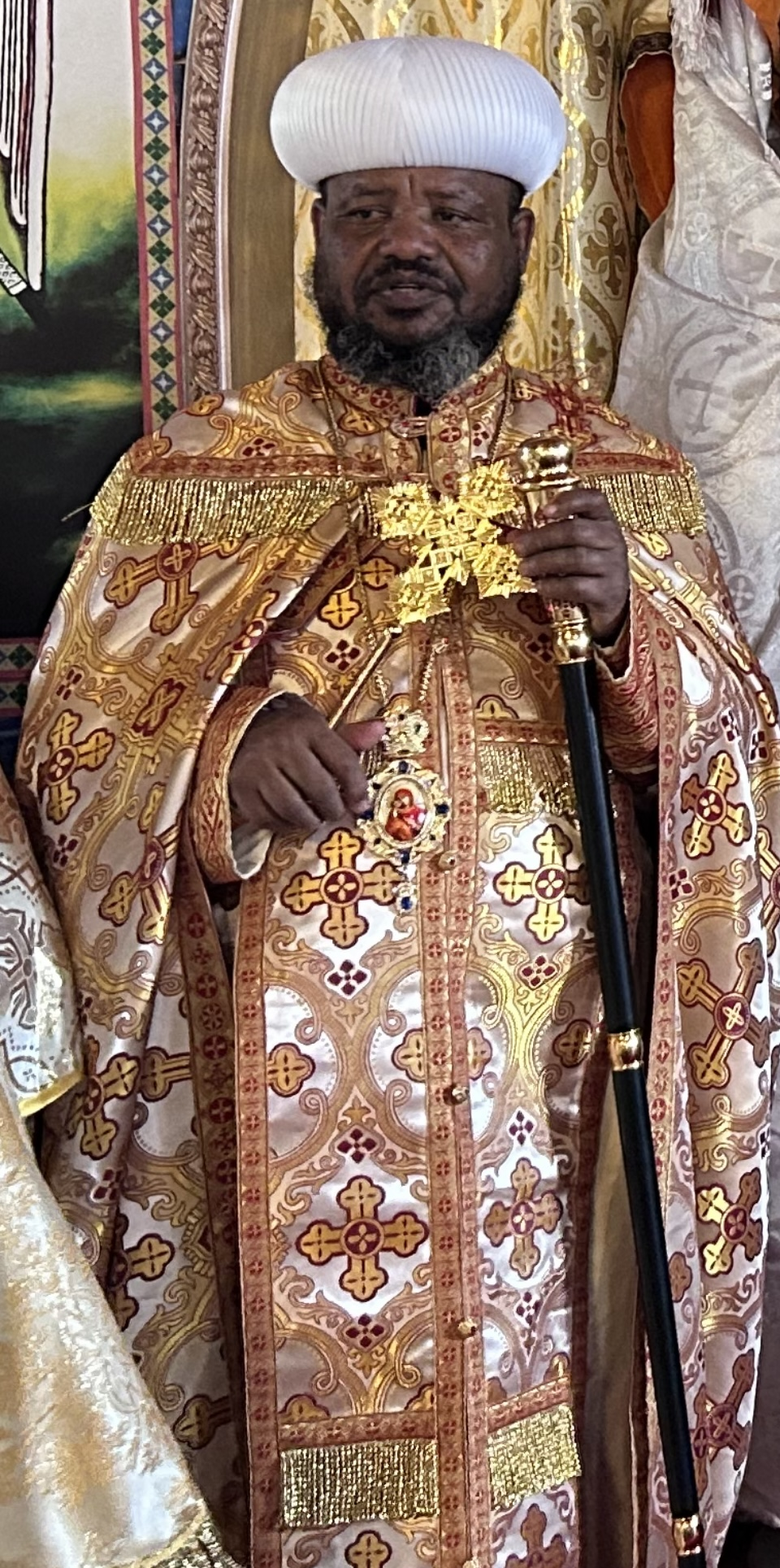
An Ethiopian Orthodox bishop in Canada

Bishops in Oriental Orthodox Church

The Oriental Orthodox Churches affirm the ideas of apostolic succession and episcopal government. Within each national Church, the bishops form a holy synod to which even the Patriarch is subject. The Syriac Orthodox Church traces its apostolic succession to Peter the Apostle and recognises Antioch as the original See of St. Peter. The Armenian Apostolic Church traces its lineage to the Apostle Bartholomew. The Indian Orthodox Church traces its lineage to the Apostle Thomas. The Ethiopian Orthodox Church received its lines of succession (Frumentius) through the Coptic Orthodox Church in the fifth century.

Both the Greek and Coptic Orthodox churches each recognise their own Pope of Alexandria (Pope and Patriarch of Alexandria and All Africa, and Pope of the Coptic Orthodox Church of Alexandria respectively), both of whom trace their apostolic succession back to the figure Mark the Evangelist. There are official, ongoing efforts in recent times to heal this ancient breach. Already, the two recognize each other's baptisms, chrismations, and marriages, making intermarriage much easier.

== Church of the East ==
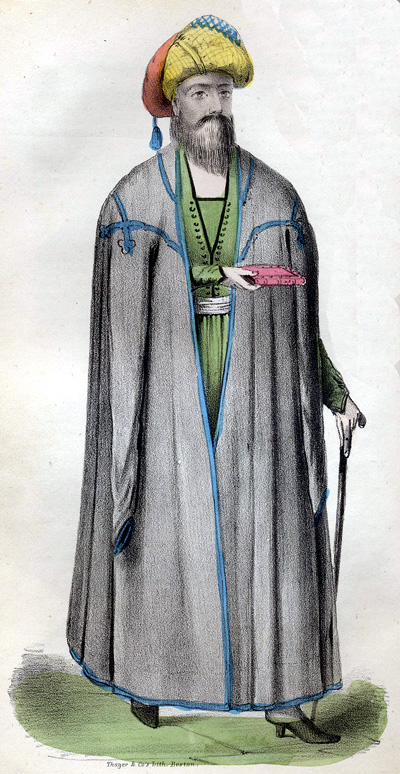
19th century Assyrian bishop in Iran

Ancient Church of the East bishops in California

Bishops in Church of the East

Historically, the Church of the East has traced its episcopal succession to Thomas the Apostle. Currently the bishops of the Assyrian Church of the East and the Ancient Church of the East continue to maintain its apostolic succession.

== Lutheran churches ==
A German Lutheran bishop's vestment

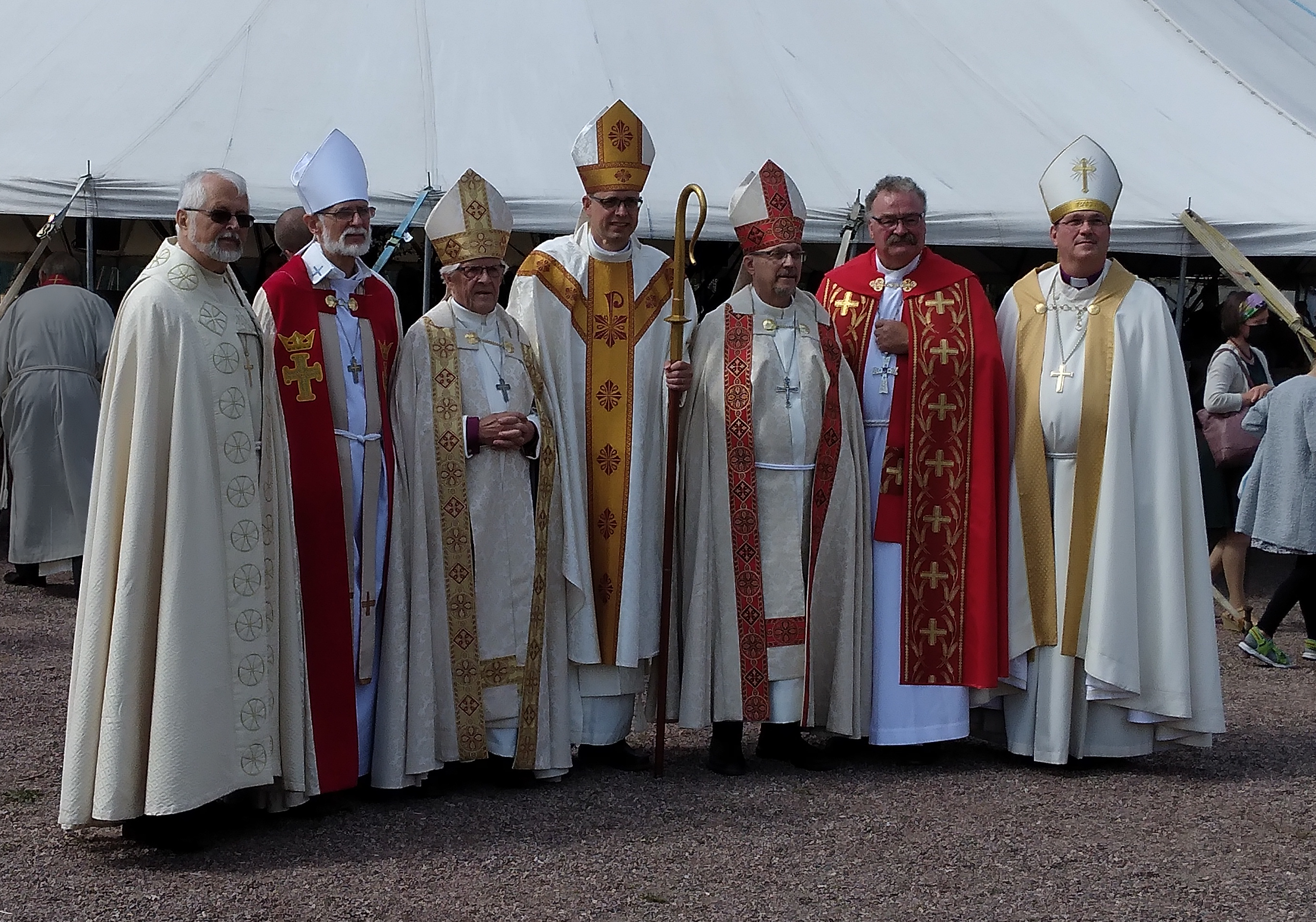
Lutheran bishops from Church of Norway, Church of Sweden, Evangelical Lutheran Church of Finland, Lutheran Church - Missouri Synod and Evangelical Lutheran Church of Latvia

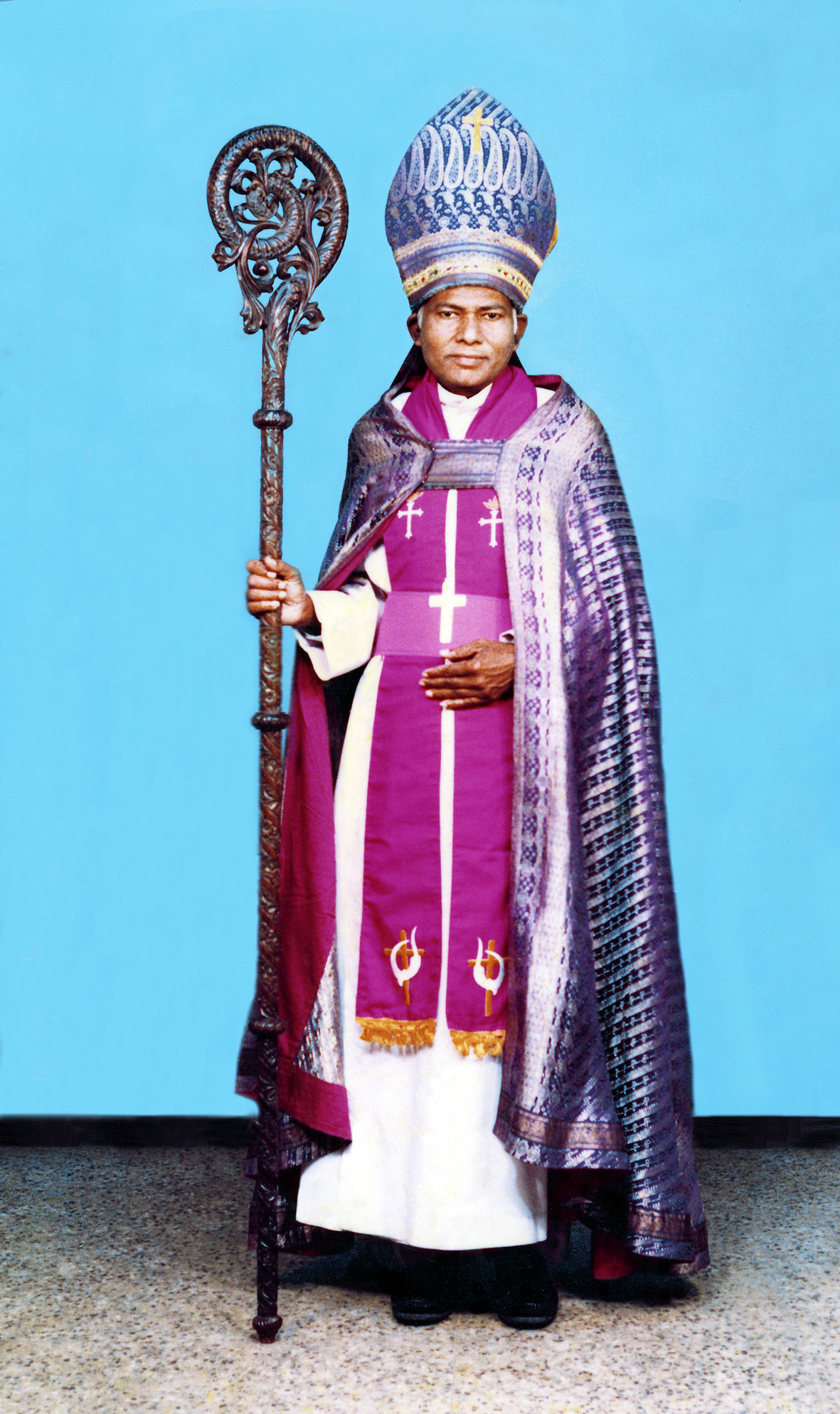
A Lutheran bishop from India

Bishops in Lutheranism

Lutheran churches, such as the Batak Christian Protestant Church, Church of Sweden and the Evangelical Lutheran Church in Kenya, maintain apostolic succession. In countries such as Sweden, Catholic bishops became Lutheran bishops during the Reformation, continuing the ancient lines of apostolic succession.

Through Swedish missionary work and the establishment of Lutheran churches in various countries, such as in Kenya, apostolic succession was continued in those denominations, such as in the Evangelical Lutheran Church in Kenya, the Evangelical Lutheran Church in Tanzania, the Evangelical Lutheran Church in Southern Africa, Tamil Evangelical Lutheran Church, Evangelical Lutheran Church in Malaysia, and Evangelical Lutheran Church in Zimbabwe, among others.

The Lutheran Church - International, a Confessional Lutheran denomination of Evangelical Catholic churchmanship has an episcopal polity, with its clergy being ordained in lines of apostolic succession.

== Anglican Communion ==
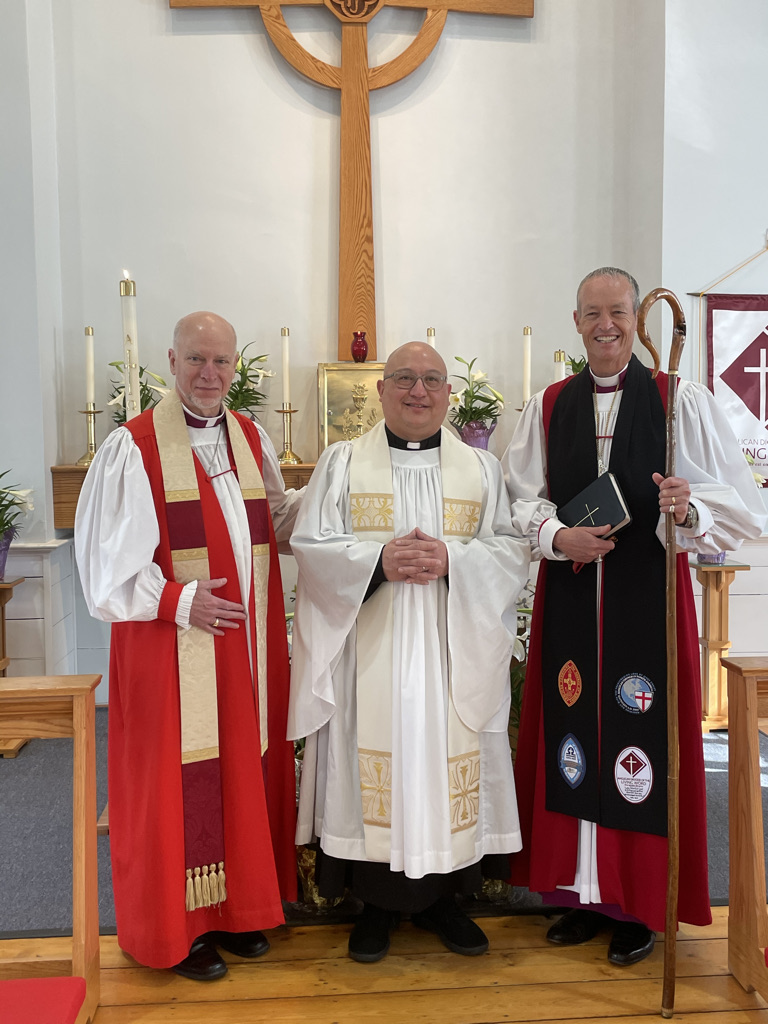
Anglican bishops in Seabury, United States

Bishops of the Church of Uganda

Humphrey Henchman, an British Anglican bishop

Bishops in Anglicanism

Anglicanism is a Reformation tradition that lays claim to the historic episcopate through apostolic succession in terms comparable to the various Roman Catholic, Orthodox, and certain Lutheran Communions. Anglicans assert unbroken episcopal succession in and through the Church of England back to Augustine of Canterbury and to the first century Roman province of Britannia. While some Celtic Christian practices were changed at the Synod of Whitby, the church in the British Isles was under papal authority from earliest times.

The legislation of Henry VIII effectively establishing the independence of the Church of England from Rome did not alter its constitutional or pastoral structures. Royal supremacy was exercised through the extant legal structures of the church, whose leaders were bishops. Episcopacy was thus seen as a given of the Reformed Ecclesia Anglicana, and a foundation in the institution's appeal to ancient and apostolic legitimacy. What did change was that bishops were now seen to be ministers of the Crown for the spiritual government of its subjects. The influence of Richard Hooker was crucial to an evolution in this understanding in which bishops came to be seen in their more traditional role as ones who delegate to the presbyterate inherited powers, act as pastors to presbyters, and holding a particular teaching office with respect to the wider church.

Anglican opinion has differed as to the way in which episcopal government is de jure divino (by the Divine Right of Kings). On the one hand, the seventeenth century divine, John Cosin, held that episcopal authority is jure divino, but that it stemmed from "apostolic practice and the customs of the Church ... [not] absolute precept that either Christ or His Apostles gave about it" (a view maintained also by Hooker). In contrast, Lancelot Andrewes and others held that episcopal government is derived from Christ via the apostles. Regardless, both parties viewed the episcopacy as bearing the apostolic function of oversight which both includes, and derives from, the power of ordination, and is normative for the governance of the church. The practice of apostolic succession both ensures the legitimacy of the church's mission and establishes the unity, communion, and continuity of the local church with the universal church. This formulation, in turn, laid the groundwork for an independent view of the church as a "sacred society" distinct from civil society, which was so crucial for the development of local churches as non-established entities outside England, and gave direct rise to the Catholic Revival and disestablishmentarianism within England.

Functionally, Anglican episcopal authority is expressed synodically, although individual provinces may accord their primate with more or less authority to act independently. Called variously "synods", "councils", or "conventions", they meet under episcopal chairmanship. In many jurisdictions, conciliar resolutions that have been passed require episcopal assent or consent to take force. Seen in this way, Anglicans often speak of "the bishop-in-synod" as the force and authority of episcopal governance. Such conciliar authority extends to the standard areas of doctrine, discipline, and worship, but in these regards is limited by Anglicanism's tradition of the limits of authority. Those limits are expressed in Article XXI of the Thirty-Nine Articles of Religion, ratified in 1571 (significantly, just as the Council of Trent was drawing to a close), which held that "General Councils ... may err, and sometimes have erred ... wherefore things ordained by them as necessary to salvation have neither strength nor authority, unless it may be declared that they be taken out of holy Scripture." Hence, Anglican jurisdictions have traditionally been conservative in their approach to either innovative doctrinal development or in encompassing actions of the church as doctrinal (see lex orandi, lex credendi).

Anglican synodical government, though varied in expression, is characteristically representative. Provinces of the Anglican Communion, their ecclesiastical provinces and dioceses are governed by councils consisting not only of bishops, but also representatives of the presbyterate and laity.

There is no international juridical authority in Anglicanism, although the tradition's common experience of episcopacy, symbolised by the historical link with the See of Canterbury, along with a common and complex liturgical tradition, has provided a measure of unity. This has been reinforced by the Lambeth Conferences of Anglican Communion bishops, which first met in 1867. These conferences, though they propose and pass resolutions, are strictly consultative, and the intent of the resolutions is to provide guideposts for Anglican jurisdictions—not direction. The Conferences also express the function of the episcopate to demonstrate the ecumenical and catholic nature of the church.

The Scottish Episcopal Church traces its history back to the origins of Christianity in Scotland. Following the 1560 Scottish Reformation the Church of Scotland was initially run by Superintendents, episcopal governance was restored in 1572, but episcopalianism alternated with periods when the Kirk was under presbyterian control until the 1711 Act allowed formation of the independent non-established Scottish Episcopal Church. The Nonjuring schism led to the British Government imposing penal laws against the church. In 1784 the Scottish church appointed Samuel Seabury as first bishop of the American Episcopal Church, beginning the worldwide Anglican Communion of churches, and in 1792 the penal laws were abolished. The church accepted the articles of the Church of England in 1804. The spread of increasingly democratic forms of representative governance has its origin in the formation of the first General Conventions of the American Episcopal Church in the 1780s, which established a "House of Bishops" and a "House of Deputies". In many jurisdictions, there is also a third, clerical House. Resolutions may be voted on jointly or by each House, in the latter case requiring passage in all Houses to be adopted by the particular council.

Churches that are members of the Anglican Communion are episcopal churches in polity, and some are named "Episcopal". However, some churches that self-identify as Anglican do not belong to the Anglican Communion, and not all episcopally-governed churches are Anglican. The Roman Catholic Church, the Old Catholic churches (in full communion with, but not members of, the Anglican Communion), and the Eastern Orthodox churches are recognized, and also their bishops, by Anglicans.

== Methodist churches ==
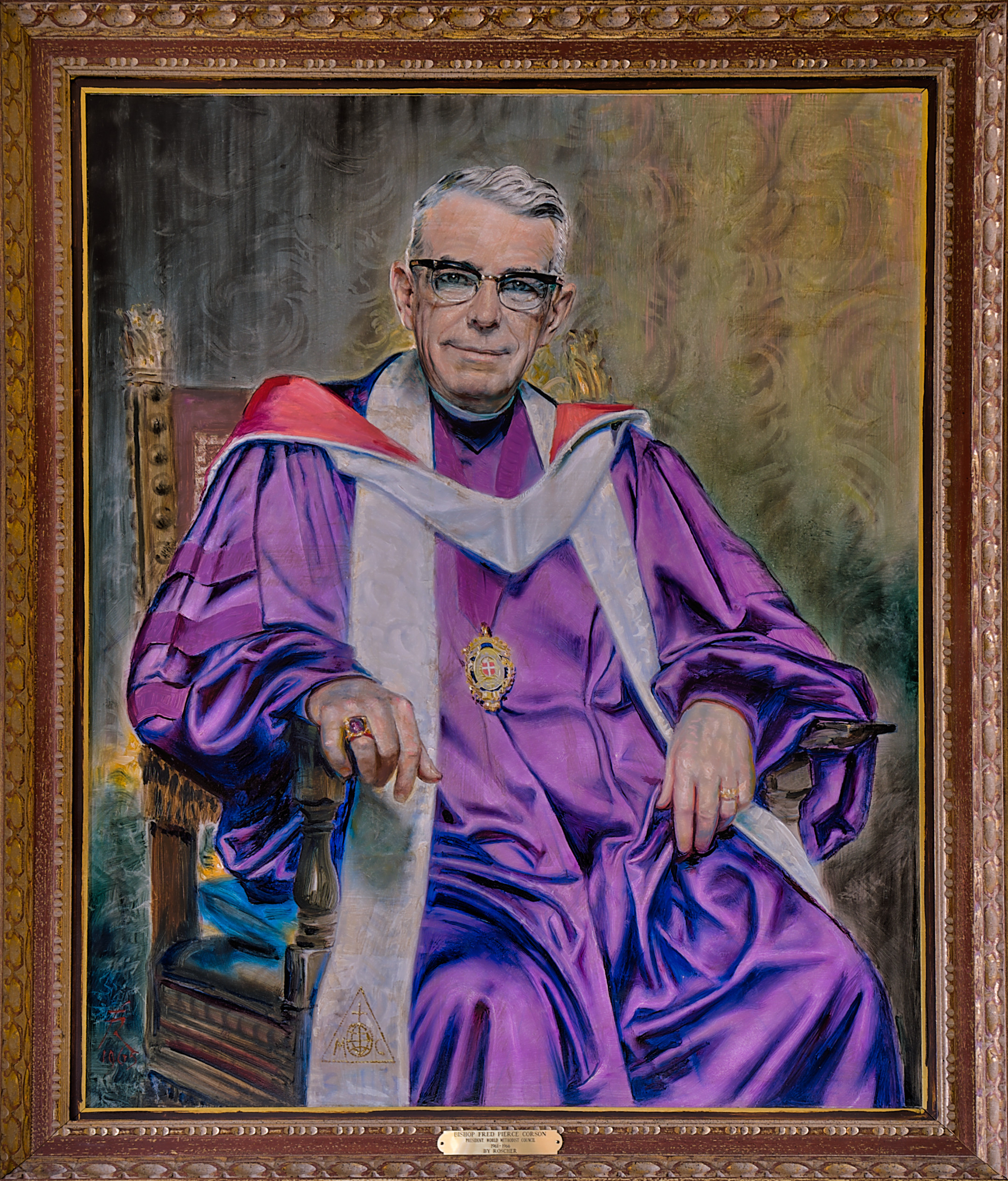
Fred Pierce Corson, president of World Methodist Council

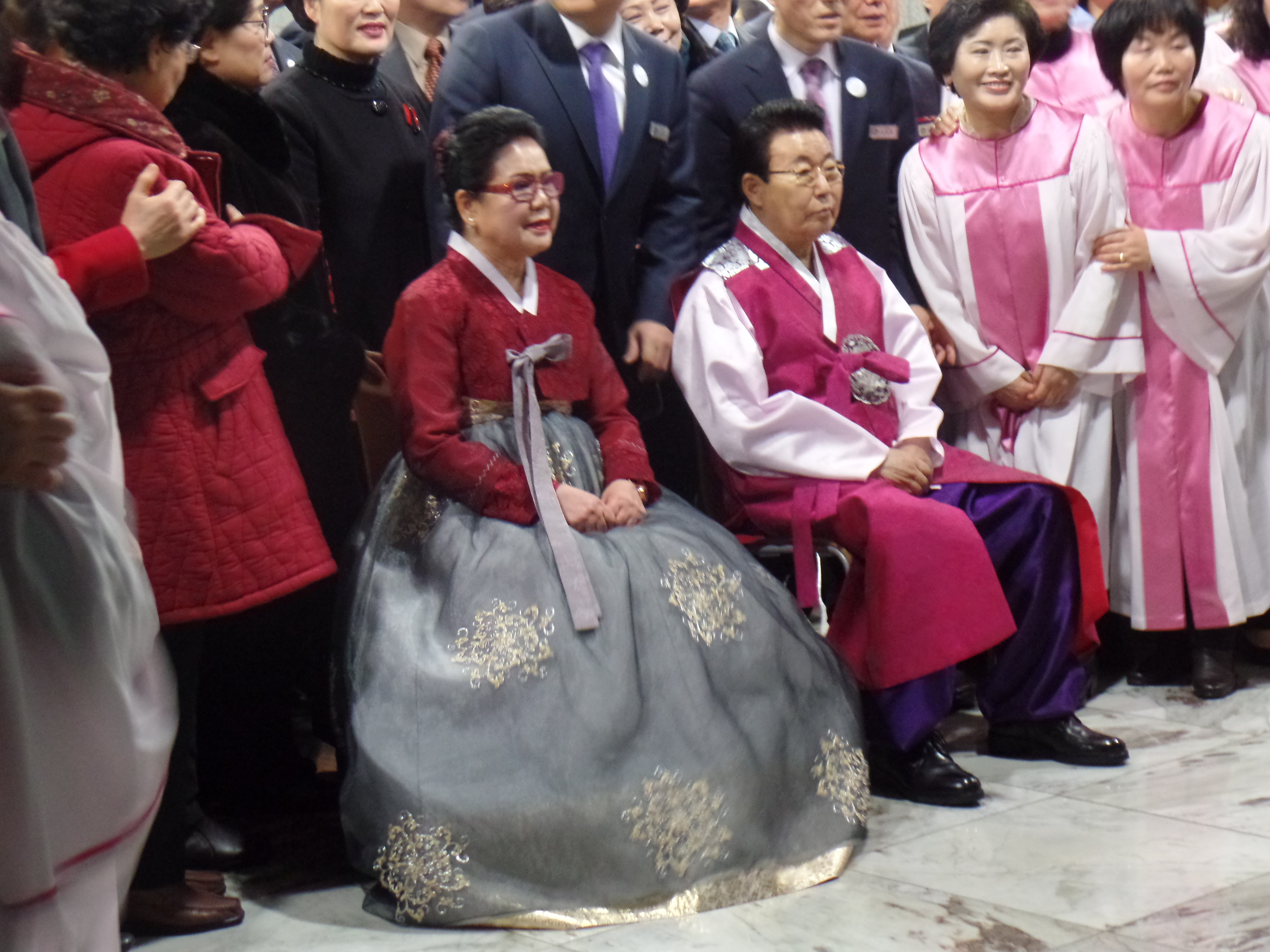
A Korean Methodist bishop with his wife at Seoul

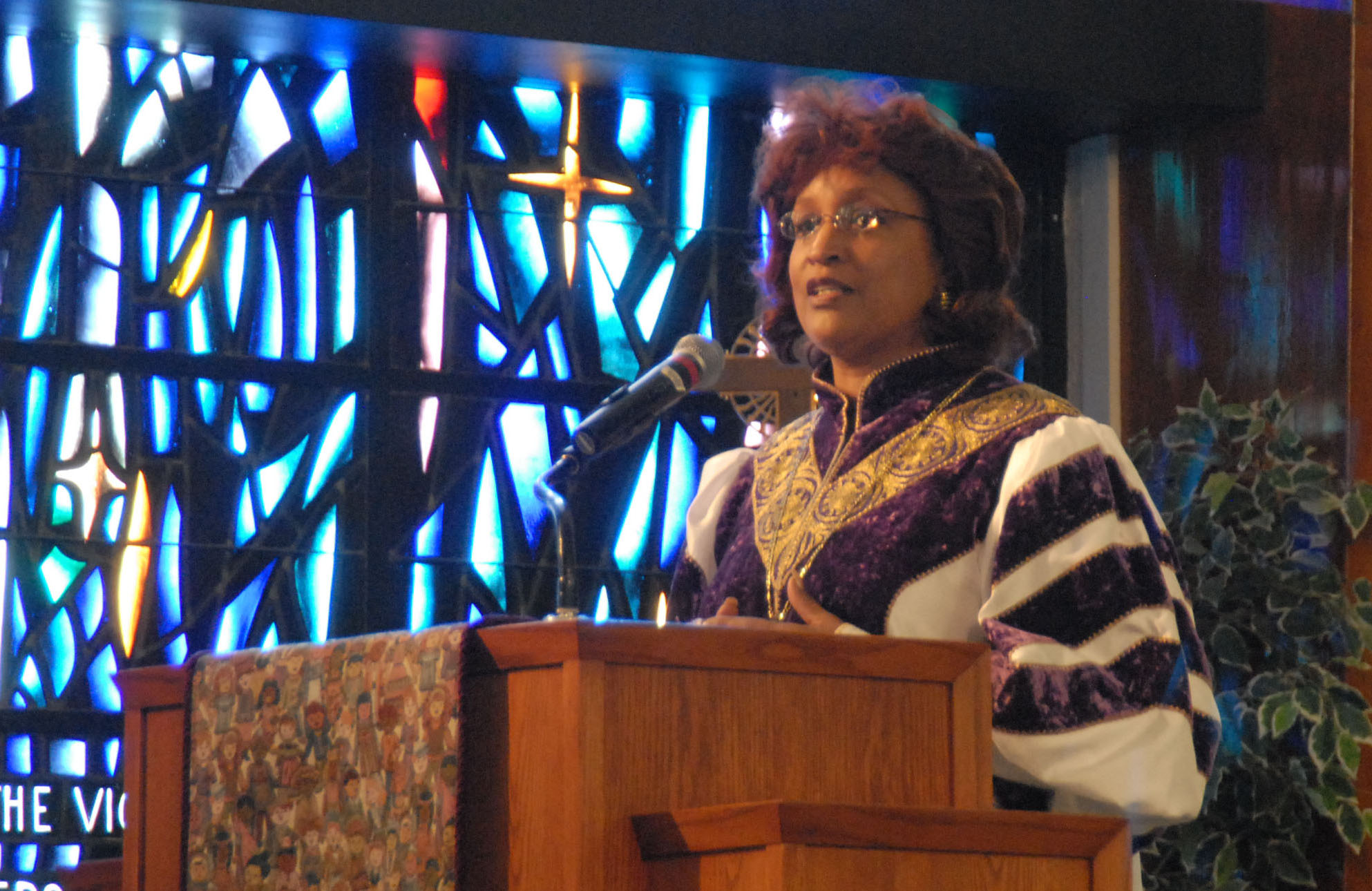
A female Methodist bishop of the African Methodist Episcopal Church

Bishops in Methodism

A number of Methodist churches often use episcopal polity for historical as well as practical reasons, albeit to limited use. Methodists often use the term connexionalism or connexional polity in addition to "episcopal". Nevertheless, the powers of the Methodist episcopacy can be relatively strong and wide-reaching compared to traditional conceptions of episcopal polity.

In the Free Methodist Church, bishops are elected.

In the United Methodist Church, bishops are elected for life, can serve up to two terms in a specific conference (three if special permission is given), are responsible for ordaining and appointing clergy to pastor churches, perform many administrative duties, preside at the annual sessions of the regional conferences and at the quadrennial meeting of the worldwide General Conference, have authority for teaching and leading the church on matters of social and doctrinal import, and serve to represent the denomination in ecumenical gatherings. United Methodist bishops in the United States serve in their appointed conferences, being moved to a new "Episcopal Area" after 8 (or 12) years, until their mandated retirement at the end of the quadrennium following their sixty-sixth birthday.

The Methodist Church in Great Britain holds that all ordained ministers are equal in terms of spirituality. However, for practical management lines are drawn into President of Conference, Chair of District, Superintendent Minister, Minister. However, all are ministers. The Fellowship of Independent Methodist Churches is non-episcopal. Similarly, the Congregational Methodist Church has a congregational polity.

== Anabaptist churches ==
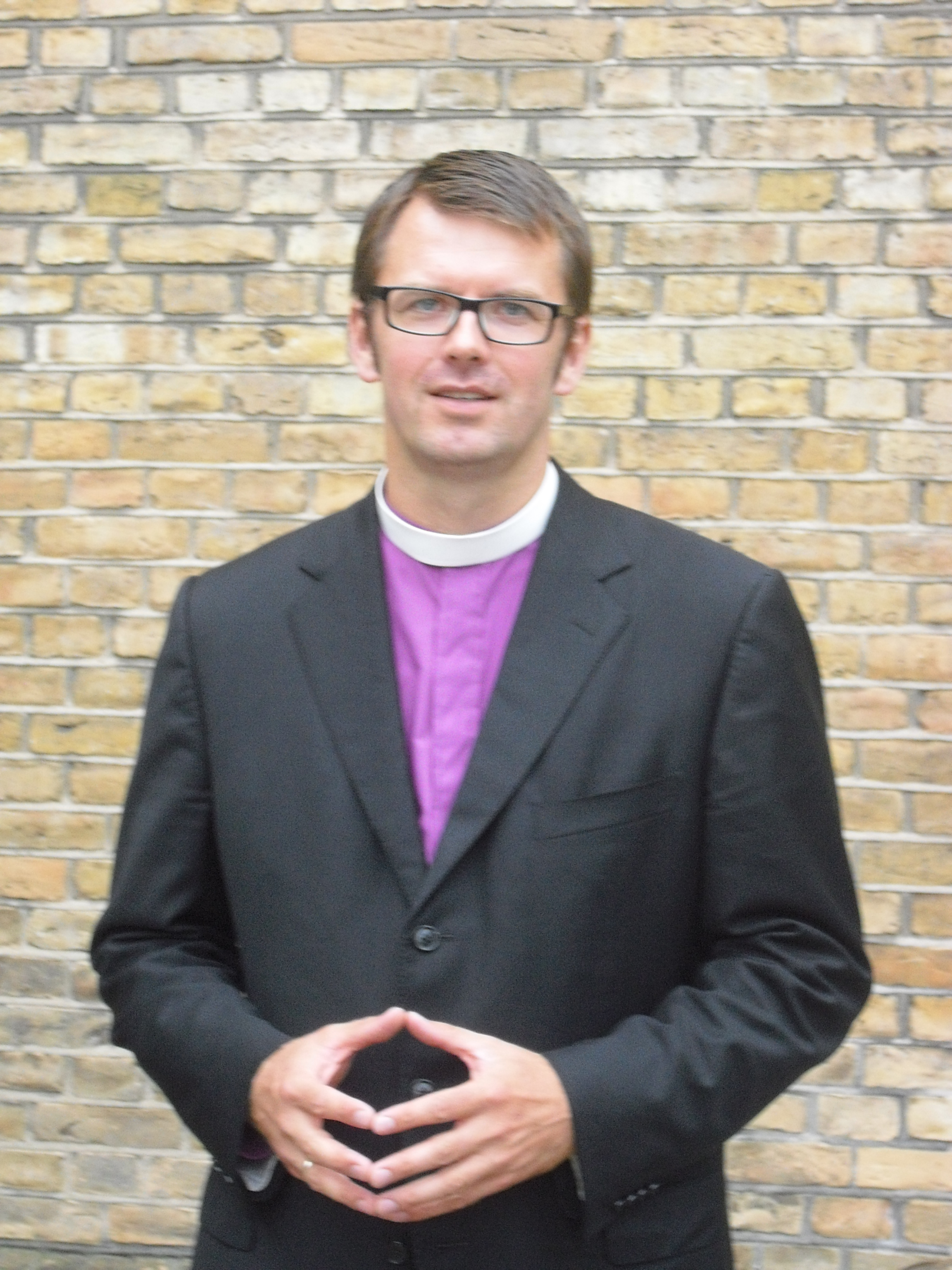
A Latvian Baptist bishop. He belongs to the Union of Baptist Churches in Latvia, which is a member of the European Baptist Federation.

Most Anabaptist churches of the plain dress tradition follow an episcopal system, at least in name. Congregational governance is strongly emphasized, and each congregation elects its pastor. Bishops enforce inter-congregational unity and may discipline pastors for breaking from traditional norms.

== Quasi-Episcopal churches ==
Desider Balthazar, Reformed bishop of Hungary

A Hungarian Reformed bishop attending a church service

Bishops of the Hungarian Reformed Church.

The Reformed Church of Hungary and Lutheran churches in continental Europe may sometimes be called "episcopal". Although these denominations may have an episcopal appearance, their form of government is not radically different from the presbyterian form, except that their councils of bishops have hierarchical jurisdiction over the local ruling bodies to a greater extent than in most Reformed churches. However, they don't maintain the historical episcopate and their "bishops" are actually superintendents in ministerial succession. As mentioned, the Lutheran Church in Sweden and Finland (along with Lutheran Churches established in various parts of the world by missionaries from these denominations) are exceptions, claiming apostolic succession in a pattern somewhat like the Anglican churches. Otherwise, forms of polity are not mandated in the Lutheran churches, as it is not regarded as having doctrinal significance.

== Other Protestant churches ==
Hussite bishops of the Czechoslovak Hussite Church

Old World Lutheranism, for historical reasons, has tended to adopt Erastian theories of episcopal authority (by which church authority is, to a limited extent, sanctioned by secular government). In the United States, Lutheran churches tend to adopt a form of government that grants congregations more independence, but ultimately has an episcopal structure. A small minority of Episcopal Baptists exists.

== The Church of Jesus Christ of Latter-day Saints ==
A Mormon bishop from 1864 with his three wives

Although it never uses the term, the Church of Jesus Christ of Latter-day Saints is episcopal, rather than presbyterian or congregational, in the sense that it has a strict hierarchy of leadership from the local bishop/branch president up to a single prophet/president, believed to be personally authorized and guided by Jesus Christ. Local congregations (branches, wards, and stakes) have de jure boundaries by which members are allocated, and membership records are centralized. This system developed gradually from a more presbyterian polity (Joseph Smith's original title in 1830 was "First Elder") for pragmatic and doctrinal reasons, reaching a full episcopacy during the Nauvoo period (1839–1846).

== See also ==
- Episcopal subsidy
- Bishops in Calvinism
- Collegiality in the Catholic Church
- Conciliarity
- Synodality
- Magisterium
- Category:Arian bishops
- List of Unitarian bishops
