= Episcopal subsidy =

An episcopal subsidy is the term for the various ways in which parish churches support their bishop and dioceses within churches with a system of episcopal government.

In the Roman Catholic church there are a number of forms of episcopal subsidy including the cathedraticum (an annual fixed sum) and the seminaristicum which is the fee for covering the expenses of seminarians.
