= Seabury =

Seabury may refer to:

- Seabury, Dublin
- Seabury (name)
- Seabury-Western Theological Seminary
- Seabury Commission, a commission investigating corruption in New York City in 1930-32
- Seabury Hall, a college preparatory high school in Hawaii
- Bishop Seabury Academy, a college preparatory high school in Kansas
- Merchant's House Museum or Seabury Tredwell House, in the Bowery, Manhattan
- Charles L. Seabury Company, a former New York shipyard
- New Seabury, Massachusetts, a CDP
