= Seabury (name) =

Seabury is both a surname and a given name of American origin. Notable people with the name include:

Surname:

- Ruth Isabel Seabury (1892–1955), American missionary, writer and educator
- Samuel Seabury (1729–1796), American Episcopal bishop
- Samuel Seabury (1801–1872), rector of the Church of the Annunciation in New York City
- Samuel Seabury (judge) (1873–1958), judge of the New York Court of Appeals

Given name:

- Seabury Ford (1801–1855), Governor of Ohio
- Seabury C. Mastick (1871–1969), New York politician
- Seabury Quinn (1889–1969), American pulp fiction author
