= Hungarian Reformed Church =

Hungarian Reformed Church may refer to:

- Hungarian Reformed Communion, a communion of independent Reformed churches from several countries in Europe, with historical ties to the Reformed Church in the Kingdom of Hungary
- The contemporary Reformed Church in Hungary

== See also ==
- Reformation in the Kingdom of Hungary
