= Ruth Isabel Seabury =

American missionary and teacher

- Born: Ruth Isabel Seabury; June 2, 1892; Bangor, Maine
- Died: July 30, 1955 (aged 63); Muskegon, Michigan
- Occupations: missionary, writer, educator
- Writing career
- Subjects: Culture and Religion
- Notable works: Daughter of Africa, Dinabandhu

Ruth Isabel Seabury was an American missionary and teacher.

== Biography ==
She was born on June 2, 1892, in Bangor in the U.S. state of Maine. She was the eldest of five siblings born to George Edwin Seabury, an executive with Boston Edison Power, and Emma Augusta Hodgdon. Seabury graduated from Smith College in 1914 and, after two years teaching, she was elected young people's secretary of the Congregational Woman's Board of Missions. Ten years later, she became educational secretary of the American Board of Commissioners for Foreign Missions, a position she held for many years. She was a delegate to the meeting of the International Missionary Council in Madras, India, in 1938. In 1940, she received an honorary Litt.D. degree from Elon College, North Carolina. She was involved in many missionary efforts and by the time she wrote Daughter of Africa, her account of the work of South Africa's Mina Soga in 1945, she had visited twenty-three countries.

In 1947, Seabury became the educational advisor for Doshisha University in Kyoto, Japan. She was for many years an adviser to the Danforth Foundation which designed and implemented programs for the enhancement of religion on college campuses. In 1959, the construction of the Seabury Memorial Chapel was completed at International Christian University in Tokyo, Japan. The chapel was named in honor of her contributions to the founding of the university. She was called "an internationalist by instinct" and was widely known within America and overseas as a speaker on interracial brotherhood and international fellowship, causes to which she dedicated her life. She never married and died at the age of 63 in Muskegon, Michigan.

In addition to writing or co-writing various pamphlets and speeches, Seabury wrote Our Japanese Friends (1927), Dinabandhu: A Background Book on India (1938) and What Kind of a World Do You Want? which were published by the Friendship Press, Flight to Destiny! (1945) published by the Association Press, and Daughter of Africa (1945) published by the Pilgrim Press.
